= List of shipwrecks in July 1843 =

The list of shipwrecks in July 1843 includes ships sunk, foundered, wrecked, grounded, or otherwise lost during July 1843.

== 1 July ==
List of shipwrecks: 1 July 1843
Ship	State	Description
Resolution	United Kingdom	The ship ran aground at Dungarvan, County Waterford. She was on a voyage from Cardiff, Glamorgan to Kinsale, County Cork. She was refloated.

== 2 July ==
List of shipwrecks: 2 July 1843
Ship	State	Description
Columbia	(United Kingdom of Great Britain and Ireland) British North America	The steamship ran aground on the Devil's Rock, off Nova Scotia. Female passengers were taken off. She broke her back on 4 July and was wrecked. Those remaining on board were rescued, except for a crew member who was lost. She was on a voyage from Halifax, Nova Scotia to Boston, Massachusetts, United States.

== 3 July ==
List of shipwrecks: 3 July 1843
Ship	State	Description
Maria	United Kingdom	The brig was wrecked on the Mud Islands, British North America. She was on a voyage from Saint John's, Newfoundland to Saint John, New Brunswick.

== 4 July ==
List of shipwrecks: 4 July 1843
Ship	State	Description
Constitionsdagen	Flag unknown	The ship foundered in the North Sea 14 leagues (42 nautical miles (78 km) off "Rundoe". Her crew were rescued.
Mentor	United Kingdom	The ship ran aground and was severely damaged off Hartley, Northumberland. She was on a voyage from South Shields, County Durham to a Scottish port.
Rimsweil	Russia	The ship was driven ashore on Skagen, Denmark. She was on a voyage from Hull, Yorkshire, United Kingdom to Saint Petersburg.

== 7 July ==
List of shipwrecks: 7 July 1843
Ship	State	Description
Crusader	United Kingdom	The ship ran aground off Læsø, Denmark. She was on a voyage from Pillau, Prussia to London She was later refloated.

== 8 July ==
List of shipwrecks: 8 July 1843
Ship	State	Description
Bolivar	United Kingdom	The ship departed from Sierra Leone for Cork. No further trace, presumed foundered with the loss of all hands.
Tartar	United Kingdom	The ship sprang a leak and was beached at Ramsey, Isle of Man. She was on a voyage from Maryport, Cumberland to Dublin. Following repairs, she was refloated and resumed her voyage.

== 9 July ==
List of shipwrecks: 9 July 1843
Ship	State	Description
Lady Combermere	United Kingdom	The ship ran aground off Helsingør, Denmark. She was on a voyage from Kronstadt, Russia to Hull. Yorkshire. She was refloated and resumed her voyage.

== 10 July ==
List of shipwrecks: 10 July 1843
Ship	State	Description
Eliza	United Kingdom	The smack foundered in the Irish Sea off the Tuskar Rock. Her crew were rescued.
Mary	United Kingdom	The ship was in collision with Marys (United Kingdom) and foundered 40 nautical miles (74 km) west south west of Saint Peter's Island. Her crew were rescued by Marys. Mary was on a voyage from Sydney, Nova Scotia to Saint John, New Brunswick, British North America.
Recovery	United Kingdom	The ship ran aground on the Blackwater Bank, in the Irish Sea off the coast of County Dublin. She was on a voyage from Dublin to Quebec City, Province of Canada, British North America. She was refloated and resumed her voyage.

== 11 July ==
List of shipwrecks: 11 July 1843
Ship	State	Description
Prince	United Kingdom	The steamship was holed by her anchor and sank at Cork. She was refloated on 13 July.
Mary Jones	United Kingdom	The ship was driven ashore near Salonica, Greece. She was later refloated and put into Orfani.
Tre Sodskende	Norway	The sloop was in collision with Harmony (United Kingdom and foundered in the North Sea. All five people on board were rescued by Harmony. Tre Sodskende was on a voyage from South Shields, County Durham, United Kingdom to Christiansand.
Velocity	United Kingdom	The ship ran aground on the Blackwater Bank, in the Irish Sea off the coast of County Dublin. She was on a voyage from Dublin to Quebec City, Province of Canada, British North America.
Violet	United Kingdom	The ship sprang a leak and was beached at Sheerness, Kent. She was on a voyage from London to Gainsborough, Lincolnshire.
W. A. Flogger	United States	The ship was driven ashore on the Flogger. She was on a voyage from Philadelphia, Pennsylvania to Gibraltar. She was refloated and put back to Philadelphia.

== 12 July ==
List of shipwrecks: 12 July 1843
Ship	State	Description
Minstrel	United Kingdom	The ship was driven ashore and wrecked at Shoal Point, Newfoundland, British North America. Her crew were rescued. She was on a voyage from Quebec City, Province of Canada, British North America to Hull, Yorkshire.
Regular	United Kingdom	The East Indiaman, a full-rigged ship, was abandoned in the Indian Ocean. All 34 people on board were rescued by the frigate Cléopâtre (French Navy). She was on a voyage from London to Bombay, India.
Monarch	United Kingdom	The ship was abandoned in the Atlantic Ocean. Her crew were rescued by Duke of Cornwall (United Kingdom). Monarch was on a voyage from Prince Edward Island, British North America to Bideford, Devon.

== 13 July ==
List of shipwrecks: 13 July 1843
Ship	State	Description
Alert	United Kingdom	The troopship, a barque, was wrecked on Goose Island. All on board were rescued. She was on a voyage from Halifax, Nova Scotia, British North America to Portsmouth, Hampshire.
Ceres	United Kingdom	The ship ran aground at Flamborough Head, Yorkshire. She was refloated and put into the Humber.

== 14 July ==
List of shipwrecks: 14 July 1843
Ship	State	Description
Eclipse	United Kingdom	The ship was driven ashore at Thorpeness, Suffolk. She was on a voyage from Sunderland, County Durham to Jersey, Channel Islands.
Incomparabile	Portugal	The ship was wrecked on the Goodwin Sands, Kent, United Kingdom. Her crew were rescued. She was on a voyage from St. Ubes to Bergen, Norway.
Neptune	United Kingdom	The steamship ran aground at Whitburn, County Durham. All on board were rescued. She was on a voyage from Hull, Yorkshire to Newcastle upon Tyne, Northumberland. She was refloated the next day and towed into South Shields, County Durham.

== 15 July ==
List of shipwrecks: 15 July 1843
Ship	State	Description
Beresford	United Kingdom	The ship struck The Skerries, Anglesey and foundered. Her crew were rescued. She was on a voyage from Wicklow to Flint.
Victor	France	The brig was wrecked on Brazos Santiago, Republic of Texas. Her crew were rescued by the brig Lime rock (United States).

== 16 July ==
List of shipwrecks: 16 July 1843
Ship	State	Description
Antigua Packet	United Kingdom	The ship departed from Galle, Ceylon for Bombay, India. No further trace, presumed foundered in the Indian Ocean with the loss of all hands.
Mary Mallaby	(France) Mauritius	The ship was wrecked off Bandar Abbas, Iran, Her crew were rescued.

== 17 July ==
List of shipwrecks: 17 July 1843
Ship	State	Description
HMS Samarang	Royal Navy	HMS Samarang The Atholl-class corvette struck a rock in a river in the Sarawak River and capsized. Her crew survived. She had been refloated by 13 August and was returned to service.
Sir Francis Drake	United Kingdom	The paddle steamer was driven ashore in Batten Bay, Devon.
Pursuit	United Kingdom	The ship was in collision with a schooner and sank. Her crew were rescued. She was on a voyage from South Shields, County Durham to Rye, Sussex.

== 18 July ==
List of shipwrecks: 18 July 1843
Ship	State	Description
Barbara	United Kingdom	The ship was driven ashore near Holyhead, Anglesey. She was on a voyage from Quebec City, Province of Canada, British North America to Liverpool, Lancashire.
John	United Kingdom	The ship was wrecked on the Horse Bank, in Liverpool Bay. Her crew were rescued.
Pursuit	United Kingdom	The schooner was run into and sunk in the North Sea. Her crew were rescued. She was on a voyage from Newcastle upon Tyne, Northumberland to Rye, Sussex.
William and Robert	United Kingdom	The ship foundered south of St. Tudwal's Islands. Her crew were rescued. She was on a voyage from Liverpool, Lancashire to Pwllheli, Caernarfonshire.

== 20 July ==
List of shipwrecks: 20 July 1843
Ship	State	Description
Fortitude	United Kingdom	The ship ran aground on the West Burrows, in the North Sea off the coast of Essex. She was refloated and resumed her voyage to London.
Pegasus	United Kingdom	Pegasus The paddle steamer struck rocks off the Farne Islands and foundered with the loss of 51 of the 57 people on board. Survivors were rescued by Martello (United Kingdom).

== 21 July ==
List of shipwrecks: August 1843
Ship	State	Description
Amphitrite	United Kingdom	The brig was driven ashore and wrecked on "Sobasbere", off the coast of Uruguay. Her thirteen crew survived.
Joanna	Stettin	The ship was driven ashore near "the Steimunde", Prussia. Her crew were rescued.
Resolution	United Kingdom	The ship was driven ashore on the Noordwal. She was on a voyage from Havana, Cuba to Rotterdam, North Holland, Netherlands.

== 22 July ==
List of shipwrecks: 22 July 1843
Ship	State	Description
Ann	United Kingdom	The ship was driven ashore at Auberville, Calvados, France. She was on a voyage from Quillebeuf-sur-Seine, Eure to Newcastle upon Tyne, Northumberland. She was refloated on 28 July and put back to Quillebeuf-sur-Seine in a leaky condition.
Emblem	United Kingdom	The ship was driven ashore at Auberville. She was on a voyage from Quillebeuf-sur-Seine to Newcastle upon Tyne. She was refloated on 28 July and put back to Quillebeuf-sur-Seine in a leaky condition.
Falcon	United Kingdom	The brig struck a sunken rock off North Cape and foundered with the loss of twelve of her thirteen crew.
Johana	Prussia	The ship was driven ashore near the "Stelnmole". She was on a voyage from Wismar to Pillau. She was refloated on 28 July and taklen into Pillau.
Margaret and Eliza	United Kingdom	The galiot was driven ashore at Auberville. She was on a voyage from Quillebeuf-sur-Seine to Newcastle upon Tyne. She was refloated and put back to Quillebeuf-sur-Seine in a leaky condition.
Memphis	United States	The ship was wrecked near Cape Hatteras, North Carolina. She was on a voyage from New Orleans, Louisiana to New York.

== 23 July ==
List of shipwrecks: 23 July 1843
Ship	State	Description
Anna	United Kingdom	The sloop was wrecked on the Ross Sands.
Ebenezer	United Kingdom	The ship sank at Lindisfarne, Northumberland. She was on a voyage from Goole, Yorkshire to Leith, Lothian. Ebenezer was later refloated and repaired.
Euphemia	United Kingdom	The sloop was driven ashore and wrecked in Coldingham Bay. Her crew were rescued. She was on a voyage from Newcastle upon Tyne, Northumberland to Perth.
Hawthorn	United Kingdom	The ship was driven ashore at Eyemouth, Berwickshire. She was refloated and taken into Eyemouth.
Industrious Helen	United Kingdom	The ship ran aground on the Ross Sands. She was refloated and taken into Berwick upon Tweed, Northumberland for repairs.
Jane	United Kingdom	The ship ran aground on the Ross Sands. She was refloated and taken into Berwick upon Tweed for repairs.
Johanna	Wismar	The ship was driven ashore at Pillau, Prussia. She was refloated on 28 July and taken into Pillau.
Kingston	United Kingdom	The brig was driven ashore at Eyemouth. She was later refloated and taken into Eyemouth.
Return	United Kingdom	The sloop ran aground on the Ross Sands. She was declared a total loss.
Samarang	United Kingdom	The ship ran aground on the Herd Sand, in the North Sea off the coast of County Durham. She was on a voyage from South Shields, County Durham to Constantinople, Ottoman Empire. She was refloated on 26 July and taken into South Shields.

== 24 July ==
List of shipwrecks: 24 July 1843
Ship	State	Description
Demerara	United Kingdom	The ship ran aground at Helsingør, Denmark. She was refloated on 30 July.
Jane	United Kingdom	The schooner was in collision with Pluton (French Navy) in the English Channel off Dungeness, Kent with the loss of a crew member. All but one of the survivors were rescued by Pluton. Jane was discovered the next day off Beachy Head, Sussex by Amelia (United Kingdom) and towed into Dover, Kent.

== 25 July ==
List of shipwrecks: 25 July 1843
Ship	State	Description
Corrib	United Kingdom	The brig was driven ashore and wrecked on Juist, Kingdom of Hanover. Her crew were rescued. She was on a voyage from Newcastle upon Tyne, Northumberland to Bremen.
Jacobus	Sweden	The yacht sank in the Bjorskard.
HMS Lizard	Royal Navy	The paddle steamer collided with Véloce (French Navy) and sank 25 nautical miles (46 km) east of Gibraltar. Her crew were rescued by Véloce. HMS Lizard was on a voyage from Gibraltar to Barcelona, Spain.
Mercury	United States	The whaler, a schooner was capsized by a waterspout off Brazos Santiago, Republic of Texas. She drifted ashore and was wrecked.
Triumph	United Kingdom	The sloop was driven ashore at Goose River, Prince Edward Island, British North America.

== 26 July ==
List of shipwrecks: 26 July 1843
Ship	State	Description
Crescent	United Kingdom	The ship ran aground on the Gannet Ledge, off the Isle of Wight and was damaged. She was on a voyage from London to Liverpool, Lancashire. She was reflpoated and taken into Cowes, Isle of Wight.
Glenburnie	United Kingdom	The ship collided with Lochliboo (United Kingdom) and foundered in the Atlantic Ocean. Her crew were rescued. She was on a voyage from Bridgwater, Somerset to Quebec City, Province of Canada, British North America. Initially, The Times mistakenly named her as Glenbervie.
Harriett	United Kingdom	The schooner collided with the barque Northumberland (United Kingdom and sank in the Irish Sea off Grassholm, Pembrokeshire. Her crew were rescued by Northumberland. Harriett was on a voyage from Caernarfon to Liverpool, Lancashire.
Islay	United Kingdom	The ship struck a sunken rock off Raas Island, Netherlands East Indies and foundered. Her crew were rescued. She was on a voyage from Sydney, New South Wales to a port in China.
Neptune	United Kingdom	The ship was wrecked near Harboøre, Denmark. Her crew were rescued. She was on a voyage from London to Dram, Norway.
P. T. R.	United Kingdom	The ship was wrecked near Thisted, Denmark. Her crew were rescued. She was on a voyage from Hull, Yorkshire to Riga, Russia.
Watchman	(United Kingdom of Great Britain and Ireland) Saint Vincent	The drogher was wrecked at the mouth of the Rabacca Dry River.

== 27 July ==
List of shipwrecks: 27 July 1843
Ship	State	Description
Champion	United Kingdom	The ship ran aground on Scroby Sands, Norfolk. She was on a voyage from Great Yarmouth, Norfolk to Newcastle upon Tyne, Northumberland. She was refloated.
Ellen	(United Kingdom of Great Britain and Ireland) Saint Vincent	The schooner was wrecked on the Catholics Reef.
McLellan	United States	The ship was driven ashore at Falsterbo, Sweden. She was on a voyage from New York to Stettin. She was refloated and resumed her voyage.

== 28 July ==
List of shipwrecks: 28 July 1843
Ship	State	Description
Ann	United Kingdom	The ship was wrecked at Lavernock Point, Glamorgan. Her crew were rescued. She was on a voyage from Newport, Monmouthshire to Cork.
Argyll	United Kingdom	The ship sprang a leak and was beached at Yarmouth, Isle of Wight. She was on a voyage from Newcastle upon Tyne, Northumberland to Greenock, Renfrewshire.
Caroline or Clarence	United Kingdom	The barque was wrecked in Carrigaholt Bay. She was on a voyage from British North America to Tralee, County Cork.
Charlotte	(Russian Empire) Grand Duchy of Finland	The ship was driven ashore between "Rondoesund" and Ulvesund, Norway. She was on a voyage from Vyborg to Málaga, Spain.
Islay	United Kingdom	The ship struck a reef off Raas Island, Netherlands East Indies and was wrecked. Her crew were rescued. She was on a voyage from Sydney, New South Wales to China.
Lydia	United Kingdom	The ship was driven ashore at Thorpeness, Suffolk. She was refloated and resumed her voyage.
Rapid	United Kingdom	The schooner ran aground on the Scroby Sands, Norfolk. She was on a voyage from Leith, Lothian to London. She was refloated and resumed her voyage.
Royal George	United Kingdom	The ship was holed by her anchor and was beached at Penarth, Glamorgan.
Sarah	United Kingdom	The ship struck the Fernigules Rocks, in the Channel Islands and sank. Her crew were rescued. She was on a voyage from Jersey, Channel Islands to "Chassey". Sarah was subsequently refloated and towd into Jersey by HMRC Seaflower ( Board of Customs).

== 29 July ==
List of shipwrecks: 29 July 1843
Ship	State	Description
Hannah	United Kingdom	The ship was wrecked on "The Holmes". She was on a voyage from Cork to Gloucester.
Rapid	United Kingdom	The ship ran aground on Scroby Sands, Norfolk. She was on a voyage from Leith, Lothian to London. She was refloated and resumed her voyage.

== 30 July ==
List of shipwrecks: 30 July 1843
Ship	State	Description
Concord	United Kingdom	The ship was in collision with John Esdaile (United Kingdom) off Padstow, Cornwall and sank with the loss of two of her crew. She was on a voyage from Newport, Monmouthshire to Teignmouth, Devon.

== 31 July ==
List of shipwrecks: 31 July 1843
Ship	State	Description
Hannah	United Kingdom	The ship caught fire in the North Sea and was abandoned by her crew, who were rescued. She came ashore at Staithes, Yorkshire and was wrecked.
Matilda	(United Kingdom of Great Britain and Ireland) New South Wales	The ship capsized and sank in Cockle Bay. Her crew were rescued. She was on a voyage from Sydney to Brisbane.
Nestor	United Kingdom	The ship ran aground on the Cobler Reef, off the coast of Devon and was damaged. She was on a voyage from Plymouth, Devon to Quebec City, Province of Canada, British North America. She was refloated and resumed her voyage.
Racoon	United Kingdom	The ship was sighted off Cape Tiburón, Republic of New Granada whilst on a voyage from Jamaica to Saint Thomas, Virgin Islands. No further trace, presumed foundered with the loss of all hands.
Wilhelmine	Netherlands	The ship was driven ashore on the Westerhalge, Kingdom of Hanover. Her crew were rescued. She floated off on 2 August and was driven ashore on Juist.
William Thompson	United Kingdom	The brig was driven ashore 40 nautical miles (74 km) from Alexandria, Egypt. She was on a voyage from Alexandria to Trieste. She was refloated on 9 August.

== Unknown date ==
List of shipwrecks: Unknown date in July 1843
Ship	State	Description
Amethyst	United Kingdom	The ship ran aground near Copenhagen, Denmark. She was on a voyage from Hartlepool, County Durham to Copenhagen. She was refloated and taken into Helsingør, where she arrived on 19 July.
Carl Johan	Denmark	The ship foundered in the Baltic Sea off Vyborg, Grand Duchy of Finland before 8 July.
Cassiopea	Spain	The polacca was abandoned in the Mediterranean Sea off Gibraltar before 15 July.
Charlotte	Russia	The ship struck a sunken rock between "Rondøsund" and Ulvesund, Norway. She was towed into Christiansand in a waterlogged condition. Charlotte was on a voyage from Vyborg to Málaga, Spain.
Diana	(United Kingdom of Great Britain and Ireland) Van Diemen's Land	The ship was driven ashore in Portland Bay. She was refloated and taken in to Launceston for repairs.
Felice Ventura	Portugal	The ship was abandoned in the Atlantic Ocean. Her captain rescued by Benin (United Kingdom), the crew remained in the boat intending to make for Cape Palmas, Liberia. Felice Ventura was on a voyage from Paranaguá, Brazil to the Cape Verde Islands.
Girard	United States	The ship sprang a leak in the Atlantic Ocean and was abandoned. She was on a voyage from New Orleans, Louisiana to Cowes, Isle of Wight, United Kingdom.
Napoleon	(France) Guadeloupe	The sloop was abandoned off Nevis. She was subsequently taken into Nevis by Mayflower ( (United Kingdom of Great Britain and Ireland) Nevis), arriving on 13 July.
Ohio	United States	The ship was abandoned in the Atlantic Ocean 130 nautical miles (240 km) south by west of Cape San Antonio, Spain on or before 13 July.
Sidney and Jane	United Kingdom	The ship was driven ashore near Newtown, Isle of Wight. She was on a voyage from London to Bristol, Gloucestershire. She was refloated on 8 July.
St. George	United Kingdom	The ship was wrecked at Maldonado, Uruguay before 15 July.
Ulysses	United Kingdom	The ship was wrecked in the Baltic Sea. Her crew were rescued by Fanchon (Flag unknown).
Victor	France	The ship was driven ashore and wrecked at "Brassos". Her crew were rescued. She was on a voyage from Matamores, Mexico to Havre de Grâce, Seine-Inférieure.
