= Antoine Marie Ferdinand de Maussion de Candé =

Governor of Martinique, 1859–1864

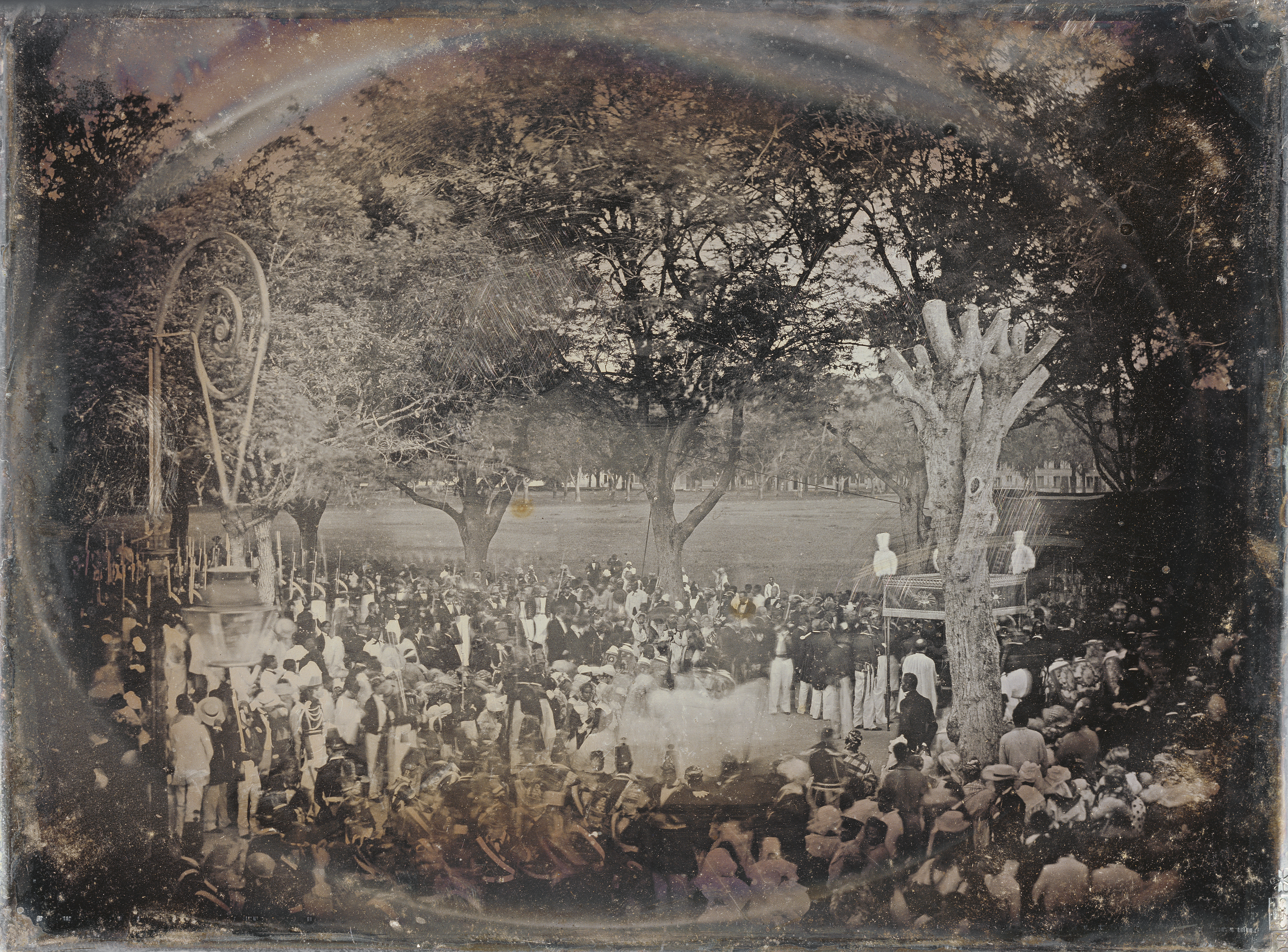
- Religious Ceremony on Martinique, 1850

Governor of Martinique
- In office 2 June 1859 – 15 July 1864
- Preceded by: Armand Louis Joseph de Fitte de Soucy; Louis André Lagrange (acting)
- Succeeded by: François-Théodore de Lapelin

Personal details
- Born: 10 March 1801 Beynac-et-Cazenac, Dordogne, France
- Died: 21 January 1867 (aged 65) Vals-les-Bains, Ardèche, France
- Occupation: Naval officer

Antoine Marie Ferdinand de Maussion de Candé (10 March 1801 – 21 January 1867), was a French rear admiral who served as governor of Martinique from 1859 to 1864.

== Early years (1801–41) ==
Antoine Marie Ferdinand de Maussion de Candé was born on 10 March 1801 in Beynac-et-Cazenac, Dordogne. His parents were Antoine-Charles de Maussion de Candé, an attorney and then magistrate and prefect of Loir-et-Cher, and Marie Elisabeth de Beaumont de Repaire. His family may be traced back to Daniel de Maussion, chevalier, secretary to King Francis I of France. He joined the navy in 1818, and was an aspirant (midshipman) as of the start of 1819. He was promoted to enseigne de vaisseau (ensign) on 17 August 1822. He served on the frigate Medée in the Levant, on the Antilope during the war of the Hundred Thousand Sons of Saint Louis in Spain and on the Zélée in the Brazil and Pacific naval division.

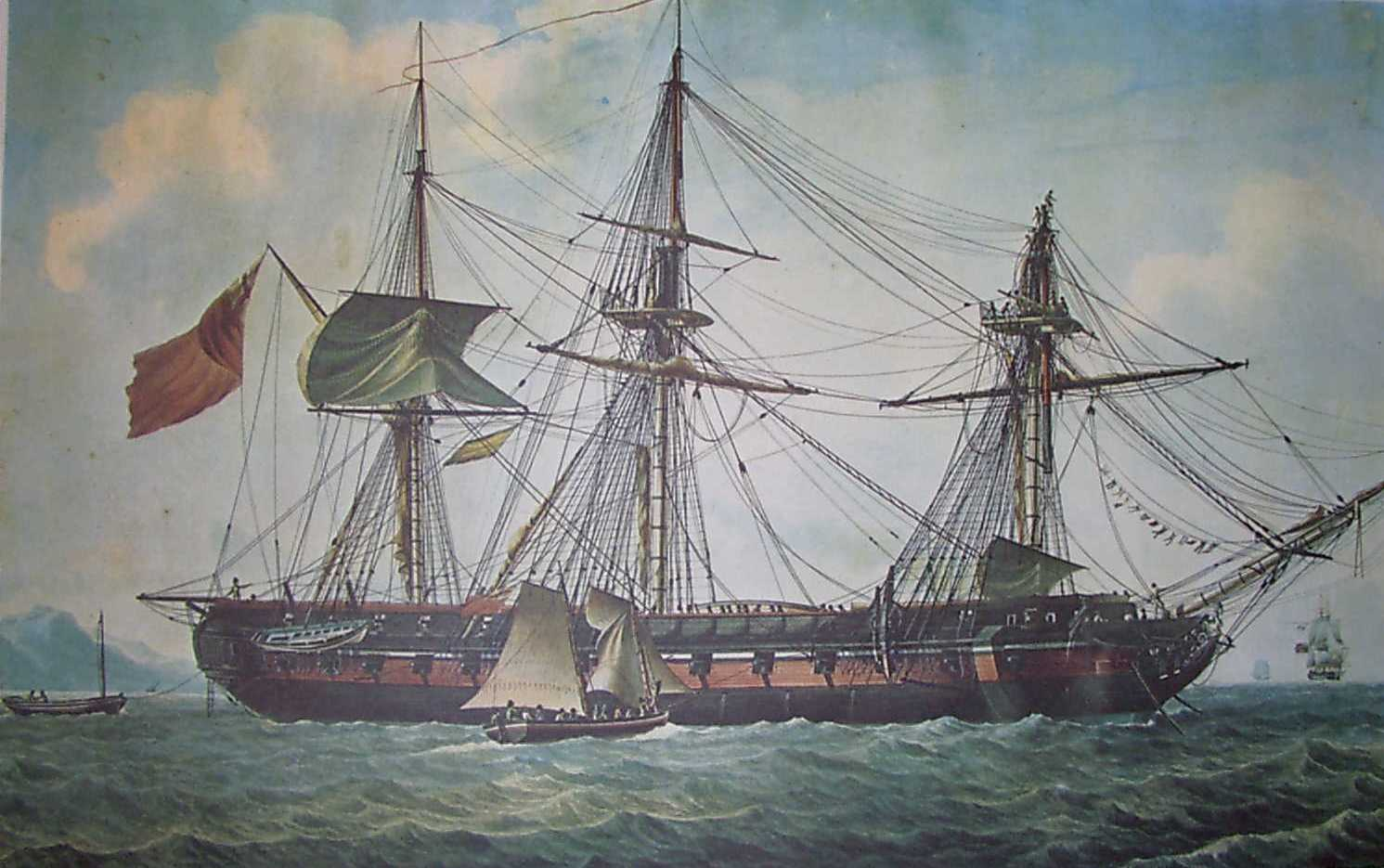
Frigate Proserpine by Antoine Roux

Maussion de Candé was promoted to lieutenant de vaisseau (ship-of-the-line lieutenant) on 31 December 1828 on the Galatée in the Levant. He served on the frigate Proserpine in the Invasion of Algiers in 1830. From 1831 to 1835 he served in the Mediterranean on the Malouine, the Chimère and the steam paddle boat Fulton. In 1836 he served as aide-de-camp to Admiral Botherel de La Bretonnière^{(fr)} on the Didon in the Antilles. On 15 February 1839 he married Athénaïs Marguerite de Bizemont in Orléans. The wedding was held in the Château de Frileuse, near Blois. From 1839 to 1841 he commanded the Vedette on the Brazil and Antilles station. The gun brig Vedette carried four guns. He served in the French blockade of the Río de la Plata.

== Captain (1841–59) ==
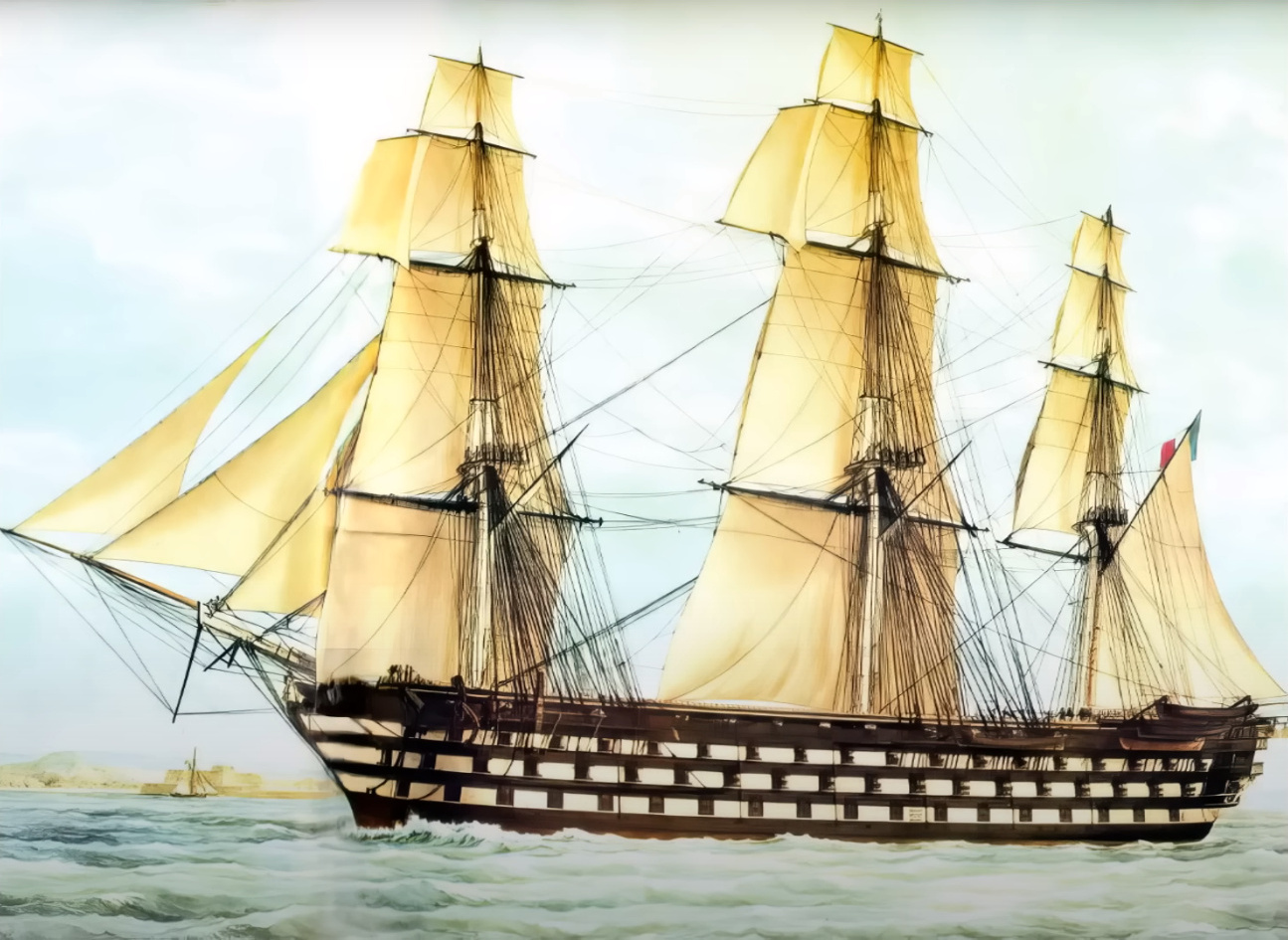
Valmy

Maussion de Candé was promoted to capitaine de frégate (frigate captain) on 31 July 1841. In 1842 he left for the China Seas on the frigate Cléopâtre. As flag captain of Admiral Jean-Baptiste Cécille he served in a campaign in the Pacific from 1844 to 1847 on the Cléopâtre. He was promoted to capitaine de vaisseau (ship-of-the-line captain) on 21 February 1847, and commanded the Valmy in the training squadron. He was flag captain of Admiral Louis Dubourdieu^{(fr)}.

In 1854 Maussion de Candé commanded the ship of the line Trident in the Baltic squadron and participated in the Battle of Bomarsund. During this engagement the Trident was the flagship of contre-amiral Charles Pénaud. The Trident was armed with 80 guns. Maussion de Cande was named Commander of the Legion of Honour for his service at Bomarsund. He then served in the Crimea, and was overall commander at Kamiesch. On 2 January 1857 he was made a Companion of the Order of the Bath.

== Governor and admiral (1859–67) ==
In April 1859 Maussion de Candé was appointed governor of Martinique. He arrived in the colony on 2 June 1859. He replaced the acting governor Louis André Lagrange. Maussion de Candé was promoted to contre-amiral (rear admiral) in July 1860. He retired from active service in March 1863, but remained in office as governor until July 1864. From 29 January 1863 to 30 September 1863 André César Vérand acted as governor in his absence. On 15 July 1864 Maussion de Candé was replaced as governor by François-Théodore de Lapelin.

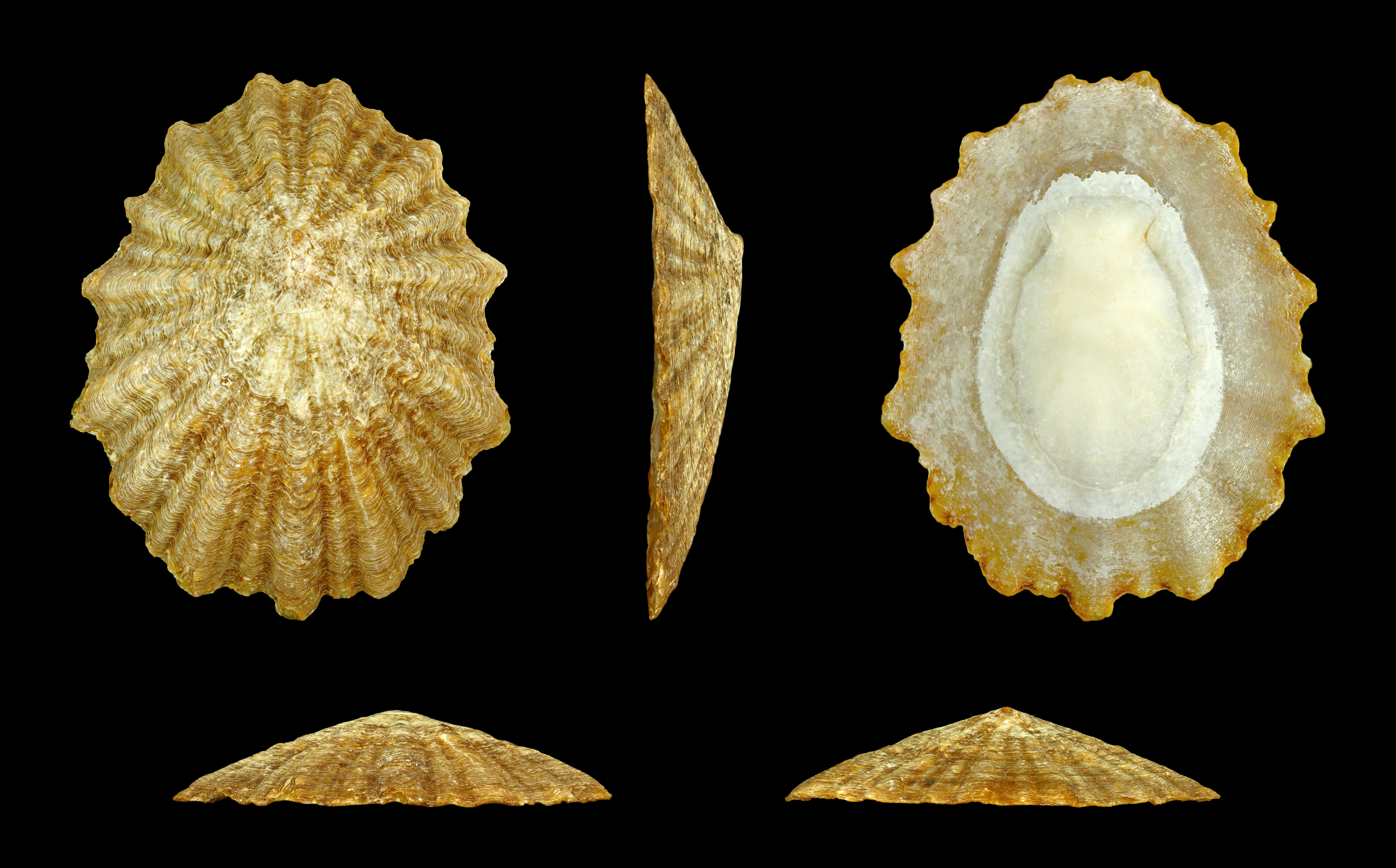
The gastropod Patella candei

Maussion de Candé died on 21 January 1867 in Vals-les-Bains, Ardèche, at the age of 65. He was a grand officer of the Legion of Honour and commander of the Order of St. Gregory the Great. The white-whiskered spinetail (Synallaxis candei) and Candé's Manakin (Manacus candei) are named after him, as are some gastropods. The naturalist Alcide d'Orbigny named the gastropods Acteocina candei, Antillophos candei, Epitonium candeanum, Acteocina candei, Gibbula candei and Patella candei and the bivalves Diplodonta candeana and Tellina candeana after him.

== Publications ==
- M. Maussion de Candé (1842), Notice sur le Golfe de Honduras et la République de Centre-Amérique, Paris: Imprimerie de Paul Dupont

== Sources ==
- Base collaborative Pierfit, "Contre-Amiral Antoine Marie Ferdinand de MAUSSION de CANDÉ", Geneanet (in French)
- Behan, T.L. (1850), Bulletins and Other State Intelligence, Compiled and arranged from the official documents published in the London gazette.
- Beolens, Bo; Watkins, Michael; Grayson, Michael (2014-08-28), The Eponym Dictionary of Birds, Bloomsbury Publishing, ISBN 978-1-4729-0574-1
- Cahoon, Ben, "Martinique", Worldstatesmen
- Guérin, Léon (1858), Histoire de la dernière guerre de Russie (1853 - 1856) ... (in French), Dufour
- Martin, Robert Montgomery (1840), "The French Navy", The Colonial Magazine and Commercial-maritime Journal
- Martinique (1870), Bulletin officiel de la Martinique (in French), Bureau de l'imprimerie du gouvernement
- Monsieur le Contre-Amiral Antoine-Marie-Ferdinand DE MAISSON DE CANDE (Placard mortuaire) (in French), 1867
- Poplimont, Ch. (1874), La France Heraldique (in French), vol. VI Maillart De Landreville - Patouillet De Deservillers
- Rouxel, Jean-Christophe; Jogerst, Gilles, Antoine Marie Ferdinand de MAUSSION de CANDÉ (in French)
- Vik, Andrew, "Candé, Ferdinand de", conchology.be, Conchology, Inc.
