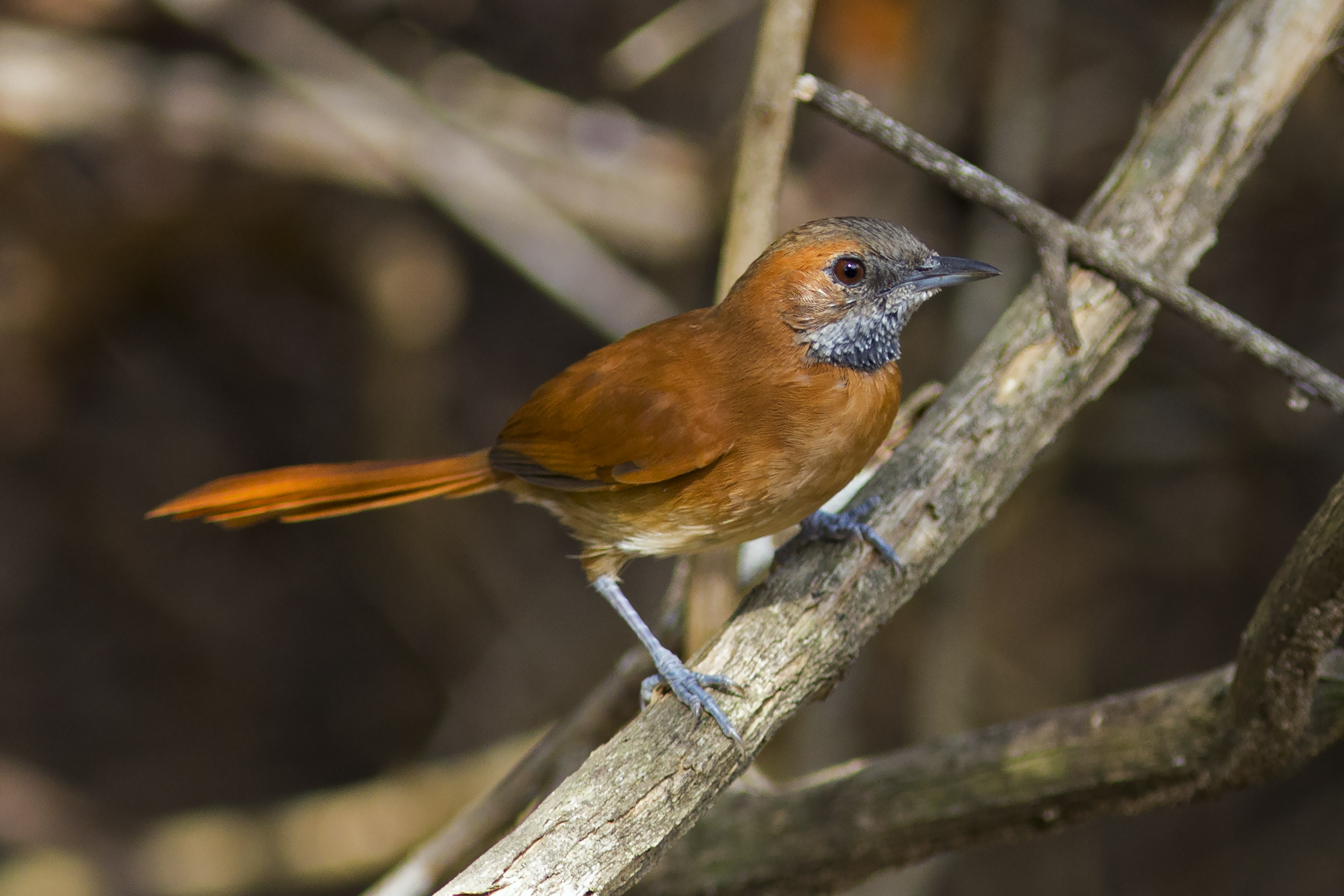

Conservation status
- Endangered (IUCN 3.1)

Scientific classification
- Kingdom: Animalia
- Phylum: Chordata
- Class: Aves
- Order: Passeriformes
- Family: Furnariidae
- Genus: Synallaxis
- Species: S. kollari

Binomial name
- Synallaxis kollari Pelzeln, 1856

= Hoary-throated spinetail =

Species of bird

The hoary-throated spinetail (Synallaxis kollari) is an Endangered bird species in the Furnariinae subfamily of the ovenbird family Furnariidae. It is found in Brazil and Guyana.

== Taxonomy and systematics ==
The hoary-throated spinetail was originally described in genus Synallaxis. In the early twentieth century some authors moved it into the newly created genus Poecilurus. By 2000 the merger of Poecilurus into Synallaxis was generally accepted and a study published in 2011 confirmed that placement. That study also established that the hoary-throated spinetail is a sister species to the white-whiskered spinetail (S. candei) and the rufous-breasted spinetail (S. erythrothorax).

The hoary-throated spinetail is monotypic.

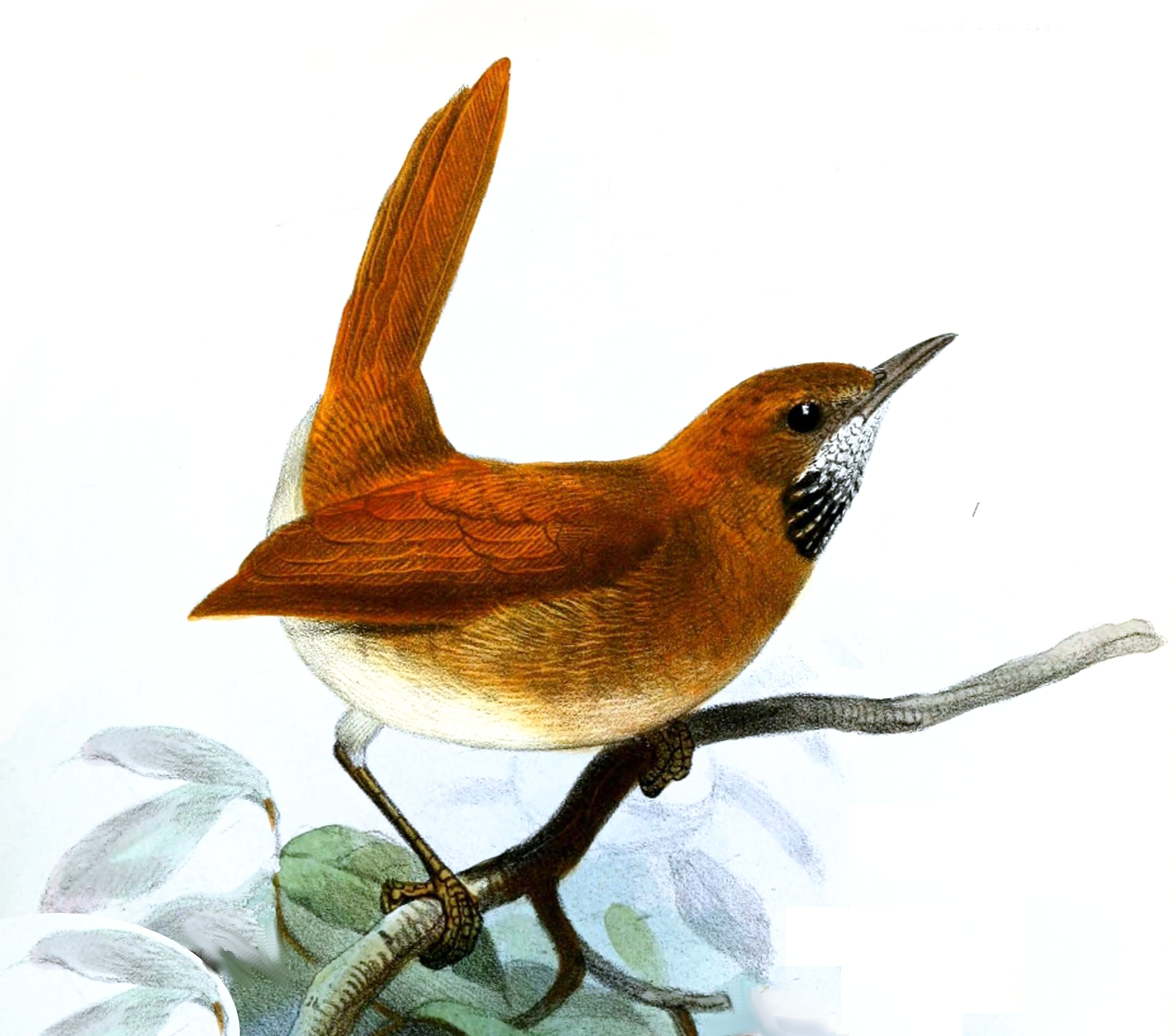
Illustration by Joseph Smit, 1874

== Description ==
The hoary-throated spinetail is 14.5 to 16 cm (5.7 to 6.3 in) long. The sexes have the same plumage. Adults have grayish lores, dark rufous cinnamon ear coverts, and a rufous streak behind the eye. Their crown is gray-brown and their nape, back, rump, and uppertail coverts bright rufous. Their wings are rufous with dusky tips on their flight feathers. Their tail is rufous. Their throat is dull black with white tips on the feathers. Their underparts are mostly rufous cinnamon with pale ochraceous lower flanks and buffy or pale cinnamon-white in the center of their belly. Their iris is dark reddish brown, their maxilla blackish gray, their mandible blue-gray with a blackish tip, and their legs and feet blue-gray.

== Distribution and habitat ==
The hoary-throated spinetail has a very restricted range in the extreme northern Amazon Basin. It is found only along several tributaries of the Branco River in the Brazilian state of Roraima and Guyana's Upper Takutu-Upper Essequibo Region. It inhabits gallery forest along the watercourses, which flow through grasslands called "Lavrado" in Brazil and the Rupununi savannah in Guyana. The total length of the narrow bands it inhabits is less than 600 km (370 mi). It favors dense undergrowth heavy with vines and Inga shrubs.

== Behavior ==
=== Movement ===
The hoary-throated spinetail is a year-round resident.

=== Feeding ===
Nothing is known about the hoary-throated spinetail's diet or foraging behavior, though it is assumed to feed on arthropods like other Synallaxis spinetails.

=== Breeding ===
Nothing is known about the hoary-throated spinetail's breeding biology. It is assumed to build a stick nest similar to those of other Synallaxis spinetails.

=== Vocalization ===
The hoary-throated spinetail makes a "double-noted 'tuh-tih', the second note higher". It is not known if this is a song or a call.

== Conservation status ==
The IUCN originally in 1988 assessed the hoary-throated spinetail as Near Threatened, then in 1994 as Vulnerable, in 2000 as Endangered, in 2005 again as Vulnerable, in 2008 again as Endangered, in 2012 as Critically Endangered, before returning to Endangered in 2024. It has a very small range and an estimated population of 1,200 to 8,100 mature individuals that is believed to be decreasing. It is primarily threatened by habitat degradation and fires associated with small-scale agricultural operations. "About 60% of the gallery forest within the species' range is inside indigenous reserves" which are not formally protected, and rice is illegally farmed in them by non-indigenous people.
