= André César Vérand =

Acting Governor of Senegal
- In office May 1853 – 30 January 1854
- Preceded by: Auguste Léopold Protet
- Succeeded by: Auguste Léopold Protet

Acting Governor of Martinique
- In office 29 January 1863 – 1863
- Preceded by: Antoine Marie Ferdinand de Maussion de Candé
- Succeeded by: François-Théodore de Lapelin

Acting Governor of Martinique
- In office 9 January 1867 – 22 February 1867
- Preceded by: François-Théodore de Lapelin
- Succeeded by: Charles Bertier

Personal details
- Born: 18 February 1805 Toulon, France
- Died: 12 September 1885 (aged 80)
- Occupation: Administrator

André César Vérand (18 February 1805 – 12 September 1885) was a French naval commissioner and colonial administrator. He served in Guadeloupe, Senegal, Mayotte, French Guiana and Martinique. He is known for his ruthless action in suppressing a revolt of plantation workers in Mayotte.

== Life ==
=== Early career (1805–50) ===
André César Vérand was born on 18 February 1805 in Toulon. He joined the navy on 17 December 1828, and became a navy clerk on 1 January 1830. Vérand was promoted to senior navy clerk (commis principal de la marine) as of 26 April 1845. He was promoted to Deputy Commissioner on 23 December 1847. Vérand was appointed Knight of the Legion of Honour on 22 May 1850 as deputy commissioner in Guadeloupe. He became an Assistant Commissioner (commissaire-adjoint de la marine) on 5 August 1850.

=== Senegal (1850–54) ===
On 25 October 1850 Vérand was appointed head of the Senegal administrative services. On 11 December 1851 Vérand married Anne Louise Seveau (1809–1882) in Saint Louis, Senegal. From May 1853 to 30 January 1854 Vérand was acting governor of Senegal in place of Auguste Léopold Protet. He was ordonnateur in Senegal from 22 May 1853 until 25 April 1854, when he was replaced by Victor-Étienne Costet as acting ordonnateur. He was promoted to Commissioner on 18 October 1853.

=== Mayotte (1854–56) ===
From 1854 Vérand was Commanding Officer on Mayotte, an archipelago between Madagascar and Mozambique. Conditions on the plantations were deteriorating, with workers complaining of abuses such as lack of payment and seizure of their land without compensation. On 2 October 1855 Vérand issued a decree that imposed forced labour contracts of 3-5 years on all the islanders, and prevented workers from leaving their work without authorization after they had filed complaints.

On 18 March 1856 there was a revolt on Mayotte after Vérand had sailed to Nosy Be to look into a case where three men with spears had attacked a plantain supervisor. 500-600 Sakalavas and Mozambicans left the plantations and took refuge in the mountains. Attempts were made to negotiate with the rebels, while a curfew was imposed. Vérand returned on 3 April 1856, stopped the negotiations, imposed a state of siege and called for military assistance from Réunion. He refused to improve conditions on the plantations for workers who returned. before the start of the rice harvest. Military action in April and May intimidated most of the rebels into returning to their villages. A judicial inquiry in June resulted in public execution of the leader of the revolt and sentences of forced labour for other rebels. In 1857 Vérand surprisingly took the side of seven leading Mayotte citizens against ten French planters in a land dispute.

=== Later career (1856–69) ===
Vérand was in French Guiana in 1858. He was promoted to Officer of the Legion of Honour on 30 December 1858. On 16 December 1861 Vérand, commissaire de marine 1st class, returned to French Guiana from leave and resumed his functions as Ordonnateur.

Vérand was Acting Governor of Martinique from 29 January to 30 September 1863 during the absence of Governor Antoine Marie Ferdinand de Maussion de Candé. On 6 September 1864 Vérand returned to Martinique from leave and resumed his functions as Ordonnateur. He was promoted to Commissioner General 2nd class on 30 December 1864. By order of 8 January 1867 Vérand was made interim governor of Martinique pending the arrival of the governor Charles Bertier. Vérand was again Acting Governor of Martinique from 9 January 1867 to 22 February 1867 in place of Governor François Théodore de Lapelin.

=== Last years (1869–85) ===
On 8 May 1869 Vérand was promoted to Commander of the Legion of Honour. He retired around this time. Vérand died on 12 September 1885.

== Sources ==
- Alpers, Edward A.; Campbell, Gwyn; Salman, Michael (2007-01-24), Resisting Bondage in Indian Ocean Africa and Asia, Routledge, ISBN 978-1-135-98317-8
- Annuaire de la Guyane française (in French), Impr. du gouvernement, 1868
- Annuaire du Gouvernement général de l'Afrique occidental française (in French), E. Larose, 1865
- Annales maritimes et coloniales: publiées avec l'approbation du ministre de la marine et des colonies (in French), Imprimerie royale, 1846
- Bulletin officiel de la Martinique (in French), Bureau de l'imprimerie du gouvernement, 1865
- Cahoon, Ben, "Martinique", Worldstatesmen.org
- Garric, Alain, "André VÉRAND", Geneanet (in French)
- Giran, Stéphane, "André César Vérand", École Navale (in French)
- Giran, Stéphane; Dulo, Bernard, "Auguste Léopold PROTET", École Navale (in French)
- Martinique (1868), Bulletin officiel de la Martinique (in French), Bureau de l'imprimerie du gouvernement
- Revue de l'Orient et de L'Algérie: bulletin de la Société orientale (in French), Société orientale, 1850
- "VERAND, André César", Base Léonore (in French), Archives nationales
