= French ship Henri IV =

Ship of the line of the French Navy

The Henri IV was a 100-gun ship of the line of the French Navy, named after Henry IV of France. She was launched in 1848. Her shipwreck in a storm off Sebastopol in 1854 marked the beginnings of French meteorology.

== History ==
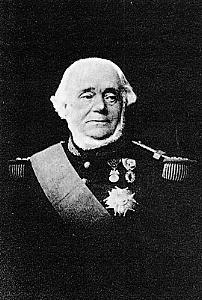
Admiral De Gueydon, captain of the Henri IV.

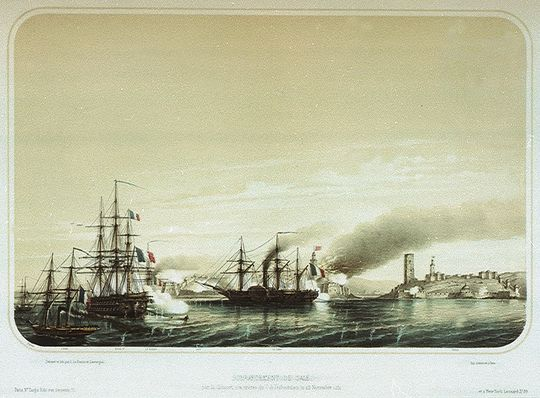
Henri IV at the bombardment of Salé.

Henri IV was the last warship launched under Louis Philippe I and also saw service under the French Second Republic and Second French Empire. She was commanded by Louis Henri de Gueydon from 1850 to 1852 and took part in the bombardment of Salé on 26 November 1851, suffering major damage and losing her main mast.

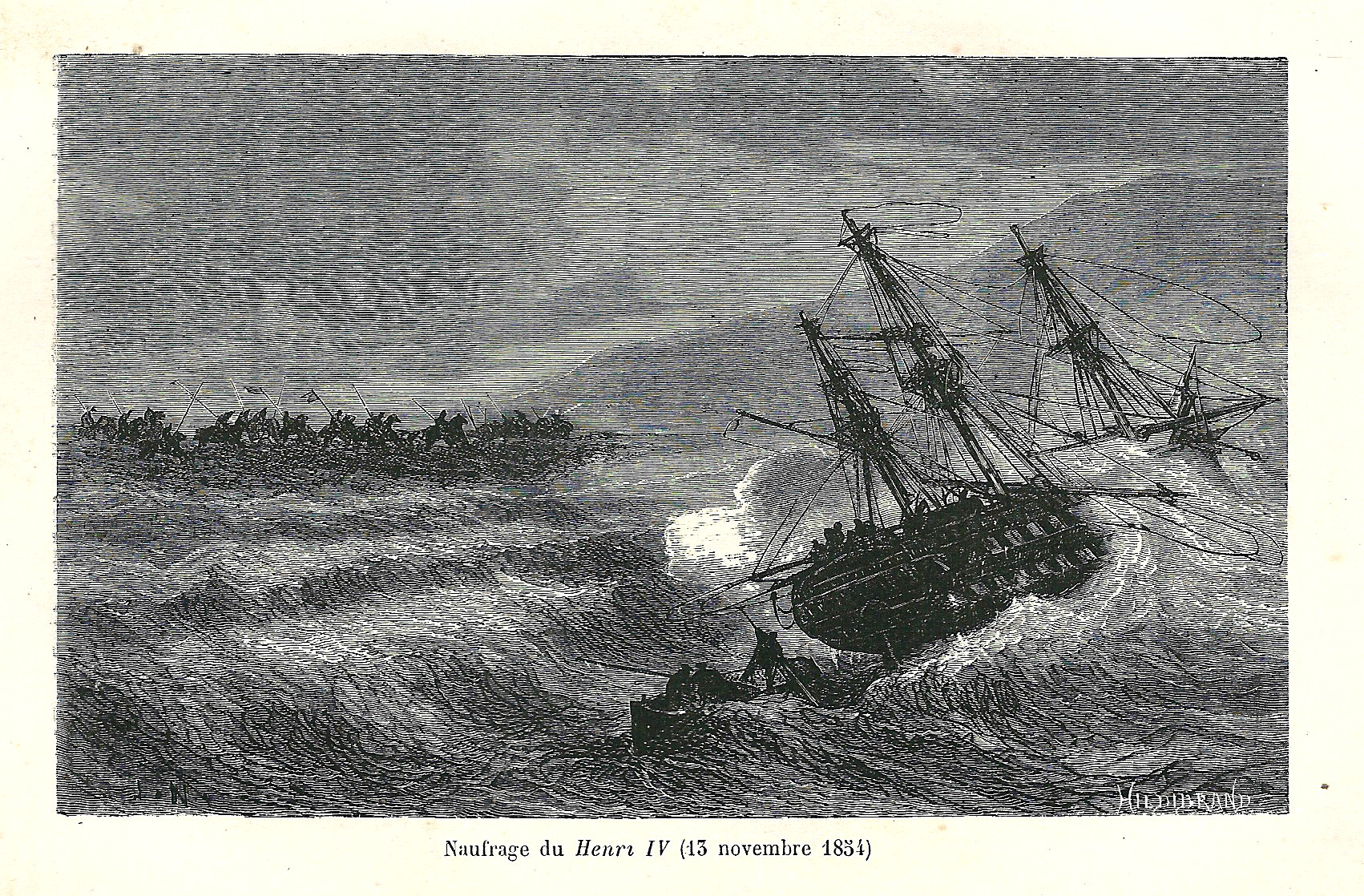
Shipwreck of the Henri IV.

She also fought in the Crimean War, including the Siege of Sevastopol. A major hurricane took the Allied fleet by surprise off the coast of Eupatoria on 14 November 1854, sinking the Henri IV and the corvette Pluton. They were two of 38 French, Ottoman and British ships lost in November 1854. The sinking of the Henri IV proved a spur to French meteorological research.

== Bibliography ==
- Frédéric Zurcher and Élie-Philippe Margollé, Les Naufrages célèbres, Paris : Hachette, 1873 - 3rd edition, 1877, chap.19, pp. 184–195
