= French frigate Cléopâtre =

Several ships of the French Navy have borne the name Cléopâtre in honour of Cleopatra, pharaoh of Egypt:

- Cléopâtre (1781), a 32-gun Vénus-class frigate
- Cléopâtre (1817), a 40-gun Armide-class frigate
- Cléopâtre (1838), a 52-gun Artémise-class frigate
