= French cruiser Gueydon =

1899 French armoured cruiser

Gueydon
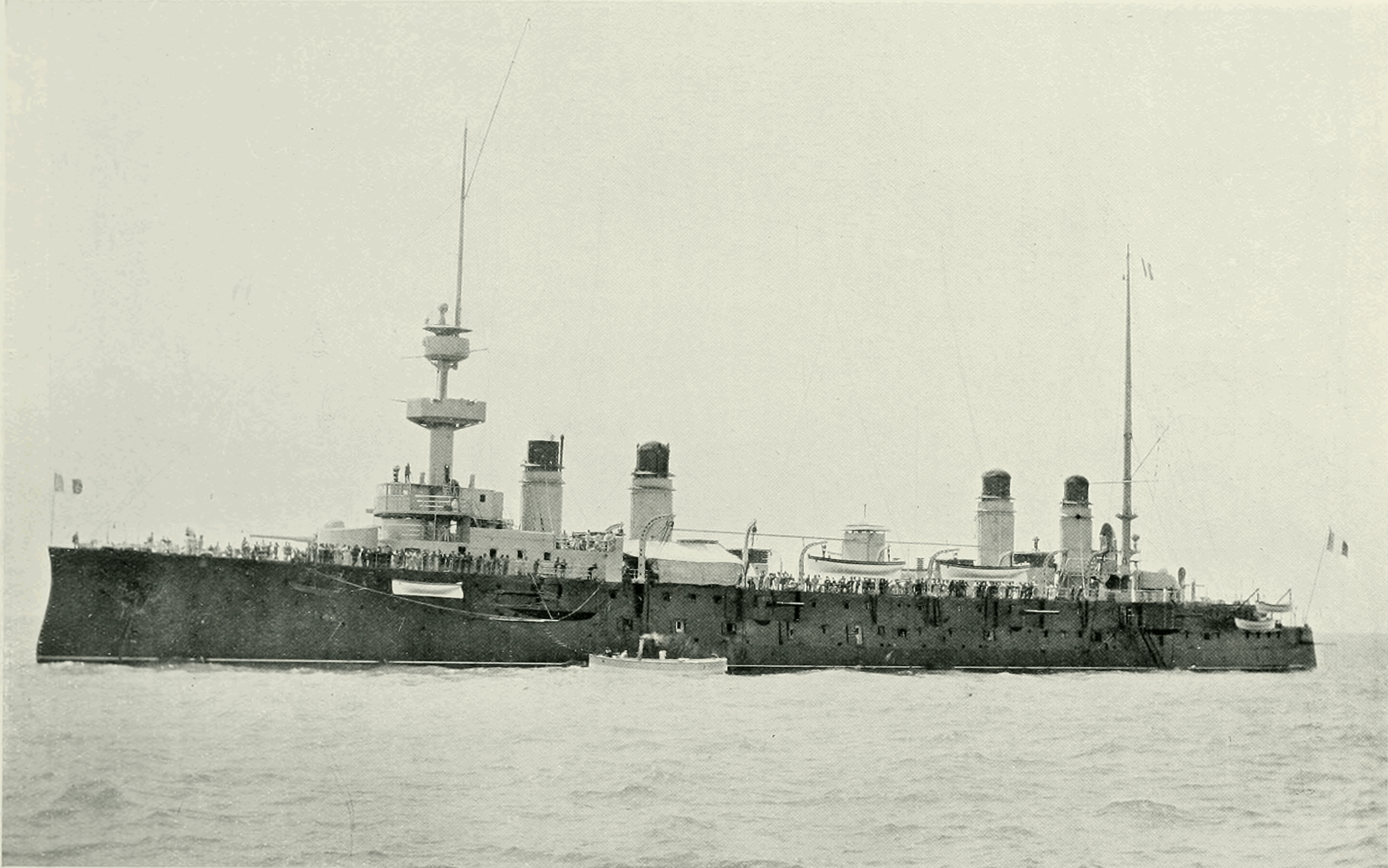
- Sister ship Montcalm at anchor, 1902

History

France
- Name: Gueydon
- Namesake: Louis Henri de Gueydon
- Builder: Arsenal de Toulon
- Launched: 20 September 1899
- In service: 1 September 1903
- Fate: Sunk by RAF aircraft, 13/14 August 1944

General characteristics
- Class & type: Gueydon-class armoured cruiser
- Displacement: 9,548 tonnes (9,397 long tons)
- Length: 137.97 m (452 ft 8 in)
- Beam: 19.38 m (63 ft 7 in)
- Draught: 7.67 m (25 ft 2 in)
- Installed power: 20,000 PS (15,000 kW); 28 Niclausse boilers
- Propulsion: 3 Shafts, 3 vertical triple-expansion steam engines
- Speed: 21 knots (39 km/h; 24 mph)
- Range: 8,500 nmi (15,700 km; 9,800 mi) at 10 knots (19 km/h; 12 mph)
- Complement: 566
- Armament: 2 × single 194 mm (7.6 in)/40 guns; 8 × single 164 mm (6.5 in)/45 guns; 4 × single 100 mm (3.9 in)/45 guns; 10 × single 47 mm (1.9 in)/55 guns; 4 × single 37 mm (1.5 in) guns; 2 × 450 mm (17.7 in) torpedo tubes
- Armour: Waterline belt: 80–150 mm (3.1–5.9 in); Deck: 30–55 mm (1.2–2.2 in); Gun turrets: 160–176 mm (6.3–6.9 in)

The French cruiser Gueydon was the name ship of her class of armoured cruisers built for the French Navy in the 1890s.

== Design and description ==
Designed by the naval architect Emile Bertin, the Gueydon-class ships were intended to fill the commerce-raiding strategy of the Jeune École. They measured 137.97 meters (452 ft 8 in) long overall with a beam of 19.38 meters (63 ft 7 in) and had a draught of 7.67 meters (25 ft 2 in). Gueydon displaced 9,548 metric tons (9,397 long tons). The ship had a crew of 566 officers and enlisted men.

The Gueydon class had three vertical triple-expansion steam engines, each driving a single propeller shaft. Steam for Gueydon's engines was provided by 28 Niclausse boilers and they were rated at a total of 20,000 metric horsepower (15,000 kW) that gave them a speed of 21 knots (39 km/h; 24 mph). The ships could carry enough coal to steam for 8,500 nautical miles (15,700 km; 9,800 mi) at a speed of 10 knots (19 km/h; 12 mph).

The Gueydons had a main armament that consisted of two 40-caliber 194 mm (7.6 in) guns that were mounted in single gun turrets, one each fore and aft of the superstructure. Their secondary armament comprised eight 45-caliber quick-firing (QF) Canon de 164 mm (6.5 in) Modèle 1893 guns in casemates. For anti-torpedo boat defense, they carried four 45-caliber QF Canon de 100 mm (3.9 in) Modèle 1891 guns on the forecastle deck, as well as ten QF 47 mm (1.9 in) and four QF 37 mm (1.5 in) Hotchkiss guns. They were also armed with two submerged 450-millimetre (17.7 in) torpedo tubes.

The Harvey armor belt of the Gueydon-class cruisers covered most of the ships' hull. The lower strake of armor was generally 150 millimetres (5.9 in) thick, although it reduced to 91 millimetres (3.6 in) forward, 81 millimetres (3.2 in) aft. The curved lower protective deck ranged in thickness from 51 to 56 millimetres (2.0 to 2.2 in). The gun turrets were protected by 160–176-millimetre (6.3–6.9 in) armor and had roofs 23 millimetres (0.9 in) thick.

== Construction and career ==
Gueydon was named in honour of Louis Henri de Gueydon, first governor of Algeria under the 3rd Republic. She was commissioned in Toulon harbour in 1903, and undertook a first campaign to East Asia. She took part in the First World War, supervising patrols in Southern America and in the Caribbean.

In 1923, she was refitted in Brest harbour. In 1926, she was again modified to serve as a gunnery school; she entered this role the following year, replacing the armoured cruiser Pothuau in Brest.

In 1941, her hull was used by the Germans (with two old French sloops) to form the basis for a decoy-dummy of the Prinz Eugen.

The hulk of Gueydon was bombed by aircraft from the RAF's 617 Squadron on 13 and 14 August 1944, along with the other hulks at Brest, to prevent them from being used by the Germans as blockships. The wreck was broken up after the end of the war.
