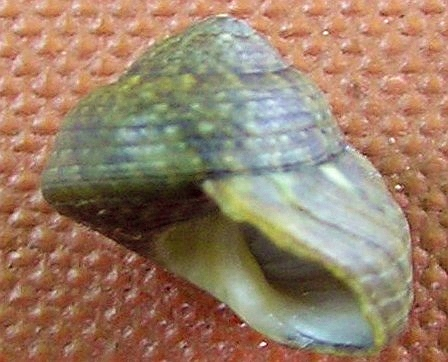

Scientific classification
- Kingdom: Animalia
- Phylum: Mollusca
- Class: Gastropoda
- Subclass: Vetigastropoda
- Order: Trochida
- Superfamily: Trochoidea
- Family: Trochidae
- Genus: Gibbula
- Species: G. candei

Binomial name
- Gibbula candei (d'Orbigny, 1844)

= Gibbula candei =

Species of gastropod

Gibbula candei is a species of sea snail, a marine gastropod mollusk in the family Trochidae, the top snails.

== Description ==
The naturalist Alcide d'Orbigny named the gastropod after Ferdinand de Candé.

The size of an adult shell varies between 10 mm and 20 mm. The conoidal shell is olive-yellowish with purplish spots on the top. The shell is elevated and longitudinally unequally striate. The spire is gradate. The whorls are subbicarinate, smooth and flat. The aperture is subquadrangular. The open umbilicus has a smooth texture.

== Distribution ==
This species occurs in the Atlantic Ocean off Madeira and the Canary Islands.
