= Armand Louis Joseph de Fitte de Soucy =

French soldier and governor (1796–1862)

Armand Louis Joseph Denis de Fitte de Soucy

Governor of Martinique
- In office August 1856 – 1859
- Preceded by: Louis Henri de Gueydon; Louis André Lagrange (acting)
- Succeeded by: Louis André Lagrange (acting); Antoine Marie Ferdinand de Maussion de Candé

Personal details
- Born: 26 March 1796 Vitry-sur-Seine, Paris, France.
- Died: 1 January 1862 (aged 65) Versailles, Yvelines, France
- Occupation: Soldier

Armand Louis Joseph Denis de Fitte de Soucy (or Louis Joseph Defitte; 26 March 1796 – 21 January 1862) was a French soldier who served in Senegal, Guadeloupe and Martinique, and rose to the rank of divisional general. He was governor of Martinique from 1856 to 1859.

== Birth and family ==
Armand Louis Joseph Denis de Fitte de Soucy was born on 26 March 1796 in Vitry-sur-Seine, Paris, France. His family had long belonged to the noblesse de robe of Paris and included officials in finance and also members of the army. The first record is of Pierre de Ficte, or de Fitte, of Bruyères-le-Châtel, seigneur de Soucy, a treasury official in 1552–67 and secretary of King Henry III of France before 1580. His parents were Louis Xavier de Fitte de Soucy, Comte De Fitte (1775–1840), who served as a deputy for the 3rd arrondissement of Seine et Oise, and Catherine Elisabeth Colson (1771–1833).

== Early military career (1812–26) ==
On 5 November 1812 de Fitte entered the École spéciale militaire de Saint-Cyr. He chose to join the artillery when he graduated, and on 1 April 1814 was made a second lieutenant in the 8th regiment. He was discharged soon after in the upheavals of Napoleon's defeat, return and second defeat. During the Bourbon Restoration, he was readmitted to the army on 21 August 1816 as a sub-lieutenant in the horse grenadiers of the Royal Guard and was promoted to lieutenant in the Royal Guard. De Fitte left active service in 1818, but in 1819 was assigned to Senegal as an acting lieutenant. While in Senegal he distinguished himself in campaigns against the people of the interior. In 1821 he was confirmed in the army with the grade of lieutenant. After returning to France he was made a Knight of the Legion of Honour on 7 January 1822.

== Captain and colonel (1826–42) ==
De Fitte returned to Senegal, where he was promoted to the rank of captain on 31 May 1826. He was then sent to Guadeloupe, where he spent ten years of continuous service. He was at first chief of staff, then on 27 December 1831 was promoted to the rank of battalion commander and was made commandant of Pointe-à-Pitre. He was promoted to lieutenant-colonel on 7 January 1836. On 31 October 1837 de Fitte was appointed colonel of the 1st regiment in Guadeloupe. He was sent to Martinique to command the troops there. He returned after a year to Guadeloupe, but the state of his health forced him to return to France, where he was given command of the 1st regiment of naval infantry in Brest. On 18 February 1840, he was appointed military commander of Guadeloupe. He was replaced as commander of the 1st regiment by Denis-Juste-Brutus Despagne. He was made an officer of the Legion of Honour on 28 April 1842.

== General (1842–62) ==
On 16 June 1842 de Fitte was named brigadier general and inspector general of naval infantry. He was promoted to commander of the Legion of Honour on 8 January 1845. He was promoted to divisional general on 14 August 1853 but remained inspector general until 1856. He was largely responsible for the new organization of the naval infantry that took effect on 31 August 1854. He organized a corps of Senegalese tirailleurs (light infantry), but this was halted by imperial decree of 21 July 1857.

De Fitte was governor of Martinique from 12 December 1856 to June 1859. He replaced Louis André Lagrange, acting governor, who had in turn, replaced Louis Henri de Gueydon. He was forced to retire from the governorship of Martinique due to poor health and was placed in the reserve. On 14 January 1859, he was replaced by Louis André Lagrange as acting governor. Lagrange was in turn replaced by Antoine Marie Ferdinand de Maussion de Candé as governor. Armand de Fitte died on 21 January 1862 in Versailles, Yvelines at the age of 65.

== Sources ==
- Bajot; Poirre (1840), Annales maritimes et coloniales (in French), Impr. Royale
- Baudouin, H. (1862), "Nécrologie", Le moniteur de l'armée: 1862 (in French)
- Cahoon, Ben, "Martinique", Worldstatesmen.org
- Chaix d'Est-Ange, Eustace (1903), "FITTE de SOUCY (de)", Dictionnaire des familles françaises anciennes ou notables à la fin du XIXe siècle (in French), vol. 18, Évreux: Charles Hérissey
- "DEFITTE DE SOUCY, Louis Joseph", Base Léonore (in French), Archives nationales
- Garric, Alain, "Armand Louis Joseph DE FITTE DE SOUCY Le Général", Geneanet (in French)
- Lesur, Charles-Louis (1862), Annuaire historique universel, ou, Histoire politique (in French), A. Thoisnier-Desplaces
