= Louis André Lagrange =

Acting Governor of Martinique
- In office 17 July 1856 – 12 December 1856
- Preceded by: Louis Henri de Gueydon
- Succeeded by: Armand Louis Joseph Denis de Fitte de Soucy

Acting Governor of Martinique
- In office 14 January 1859 – 2 June 1859
- Preceded by: Armand Louis Joseph Denis de Fitte de Soucy
- Succeeded by: Antoine Marie Ferdinand de Maussion de Candé

Personal details
- Born: 8 October 1804 Saint-Pierre, Martinique, France
- Died: 29 September 1861 (aged 56)
- Occupation: Naval administrator

Louis André Lagrange (8 October 1804 – 29 September 1861) was a French naval commissioner who was twice acting governor of Martinique.

== Life ==
=== Early years (1804–53) ===
Louis André Lagrange was born on 8 October 1804 in Saint-Pierre, Martinique. His parents were André François Lagrange, naval commissioner (commissaire de marine) and Anne Eulalie Aney. He joined the navy on 1 March 1822, and became a commis de marine (naval clerk) on 7 July 1826. Lagrange became a sous-commissaire (sub commissioner) on 9 February 1841. In October 1845 he was commissaire des travaux et approvisionnements (commissioner of works and supplies) in Martinique. He was named a Knight of the Legion of Honour on 3 May 1849. He was promoted to commissaire adjoint (deputy commissioner) on 10 May 1849.

=== Commissioner (1853–61) ===
Lagrange was promoted to commissaire on 30 July 1853. In January 1855 Lagrange was ordonnateur (head of the administration) of Martinique. Lagrange was appointed acting governor of Martinique on 17 July 1856 in place of Louis Henri de Gueydon. On 12 December 1856 he handed over to governor Armand Louis Joseph Denis de Fitte de Soucy. Lagrange was made an officer of the Legion of Honour on 12 August 1857. In December 1857 he was ordonnateur of Martinique. On 14 January 1859 he was again appointed acting governor in place of de Fitte de Soucy. On 2 June 1859 he handed over to governor Antoine Marie Ferdinand de Maussion de Candé. In 1860 he was ordonnateur of Martinique. Lagrange died on 29 September 1861 at the age of 56.

== Sources ==
- Cahoon, Ben, "Martinique", Worldstatesmen.org
- Garric, Alain, "Louis André LAGRANGE", Geneanet (in French)
- Giran, Stéphane; Jogerst, Gilles, "Joseph Charles DAIN", Ecole Navale
- "LAGRANGE, Louis André", Base Léonore (in French), Archives nationales
- Martinique (8 November 1845), Journal officiel de la Martinique (in French), Fort-de-France
- Martinique (1855), Bulletin officiel de la Martinique (in French)
- Martinique (1858), Bulletin officiel de la Martinique (in French), Bureau de l'imprimerie du gouvernement
