= Charles Bertier (journalist) =

Pierre-Charles Bertier
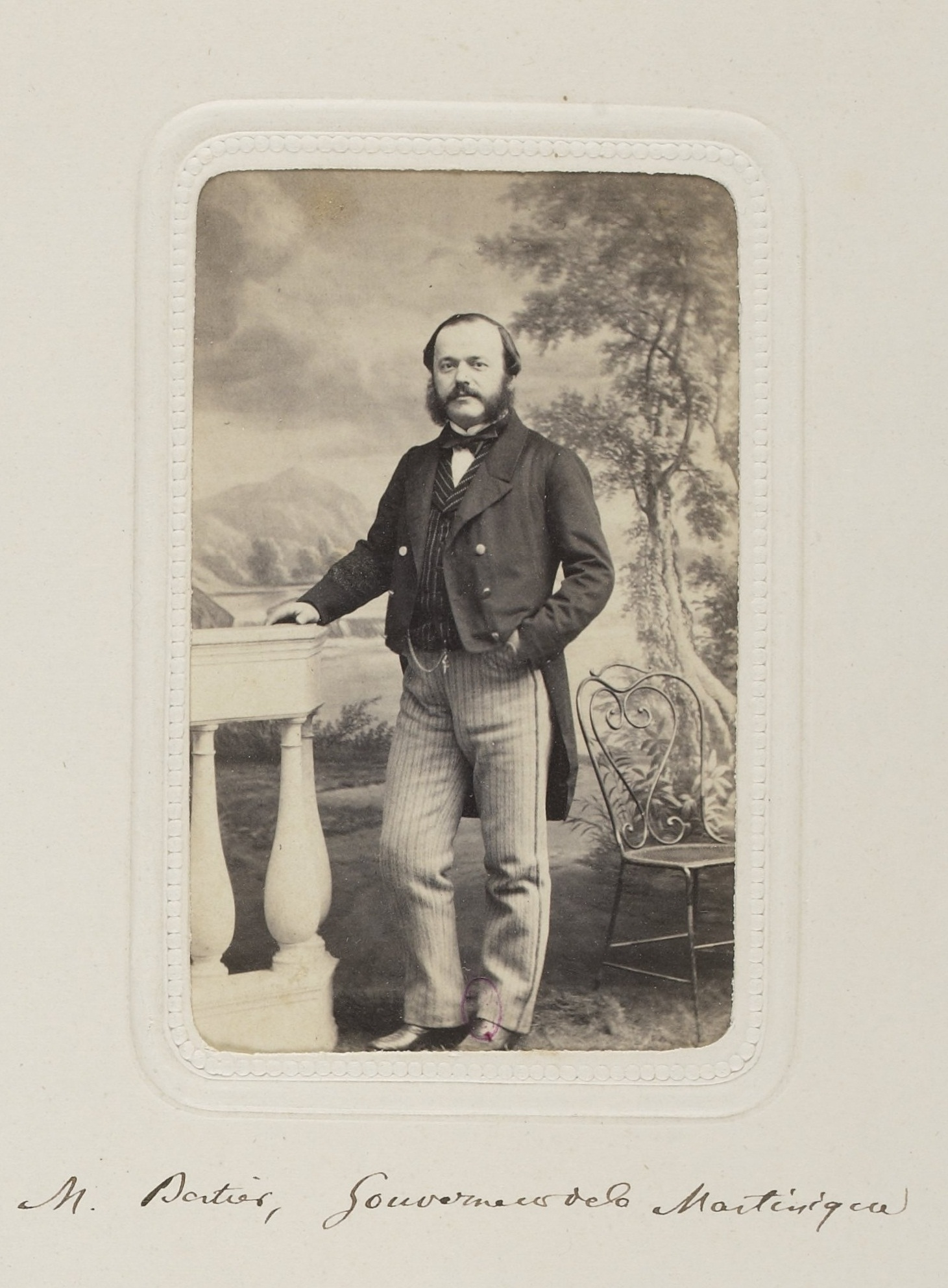

Governor of Martinique
- In office 22 February 1867 – 8 April 1869
- Preceded by: François-Théodore de Lapelin; André César Vérand (acting)
- Succeeded by: Marie Gabriel Couturier

Personal details
- Born: 25 July 1821 Aix-les-Bains, Savoie, France
- Died: 29 January 1882 (aged 60) Chambéry, Savoie, France
- Occupation: Lawyer, journalist

Charles Pierre Bertier (25 July 1821 – 29 January 1882) was a French lawyer, magistrate, director of the Courrier des Alpes, Master of Requests to the Council of State and Governor of Martinique from 1867 to 1869. He is known for the role he played in defining the terms under which Savoy was annexed to France in 1860.

== Life ==
=== Early years ===
Charles Pierre Bertier was born on 25 July 1821 in Aix-les-Bains, Savoy. He became an attorney in Chambéry. He was made a magistrate, but was dismissed in 1855.

Bertier then became director of the Courrier des Alpes. In 1858 three newspapers were published in Savoy, all in French. The leading paper was the Courrier de Alpes, edited by Bertier, a talented writer. It supported the monarchy and the church. The Gazette de Savoie gave the government position and defended the policies of the Premier, the Count of Cavour. The Progrès espoused democratic ideals. It struggled in a region where there was strong support for individual freedom but also for traditional rights and ranks.

On 25 July 1859 the doctor and journalist Gaspard-Antoine Dénarié^{(fr)}, Bertier and thirty other notables of Chambéry asked King Victor-Emmanuel II about the future of Savoy. They were no longer particularly interested in becoming part of the nascent Kingdom of Italy, which was engaged in costly wars to impose central government on the principalities, had started to destroy ecclesiastical institutions despite opposition from the Savoy deputies, was even ready to dethrone the Pope. Instead, they hoped the king would restore sovereignty to Savoy.

=== Annexation of Savoy ===
In 1860 Napoleon III made the senator Armand Laity^{(fr)} "Extraordinary Imperial Commissioner" with responsibility for propaganda for annexation of Savoy to France. At the same time a committee was formed for this purpose headed by Count Amédée Greyfié de Bellecombe^{(fr)}, a lawyer at the Court of Appeal of Chambéry, which included Charles Bertier Director of the newspaper Courrier des Alpes. On 15 February 1860 Bertier was the leader of a group of 15 notables who issued a declaration in which they supported uniting Savoy with France and opposed detaching the northern part of Savoy and annexing it to Switzerland.

On 10 March 1860 Bertier and Amédée Greyfié de Bellecombe went to Paris and met Foreign Minister Édouard Thouvenel to explain the views of the people of Savoy on becoming part of France. Bertier also met Adolphe Billault, Minister of the Interior. In a letter of 25 June 1870 Bertier said he had told Billaut that the people of Savoy would only vote for annexation if three conditions were met. Savoy had to pass to France entirely, with no dismemberment. It had to be divided into two departments corresponding to the two provinces of Savoy. Finally, the Court of Appeal of Chambéry must be preserved. The imperial government accepted the last request with no difficulty.

In its issue of 13 March 1860 the Courrier des Alpes, the official organ of the annexation published throughout Savoy, stated "We are authorized to announce that Savoy will be divided into two departments with Chambéry and Annecy for chief towns and that an imperial court will be maintained in the first of these two cities."

Bertier was one of the five leaders of a deputation of forty notables of Savoy who met the Emperor Napoleon III to inform him of the unanimous wishes of their country, the others being Greyfié de Bellecombe, de Lachenal, Ruphy and Dessaix. The emperor received them in a solemn audience on 21 March 1860 and promised to satisfy their wishes. He noted that it was unique for such a change of borders to take place not through conquest or through an uprising, but through the free consent of the legitimate sovereign supported by the people. The Treaty of Turin in which the king of Sardinia ceded Savoy and the County of Nice to France came into force on 24 March 1860.

=== Later career ===
Bertier was a member of the Conseil d'État from 1860 to 1870. He was made a Knight of the Legion of Honour on 14 August 1862. Bertier, Master of Requests first class, was named governor of Martinique by decree of 31 October 1866. On 29 December 1866 he was promoted to Officer of the Legion of Honour. (Note: The website Worldstatesmen.org shows a "Louis Auguste Bertier" (b. 1821 - d. 1882) as governor of Martinique from 22 February 1867 to April 1869. This is incorrect. The official record of his promotion to Officer of the Legion of Honour shows that Charles Pierre Bertier was the governor on 29 December 1866. The Bulletin officiel de la Martinique for 1867 lists many orders signed by "C. Bertier" as governor.) By order of the governor on 8 January 1867 the interim governorship pending his arrival was assigned to André César Vérand. Bertier's first order as governor was issued in Fort-de-France on 28 February 1867.

At the start of the French Third Republic Bertier returned to Chambéry and resumed his career as an attorney. He died on 29 January 1882 in Chambéry. In February 1882 the Courrier des Alpes noted that, "We were surprised that none of the gentlemen of the Prefecture represented the government at the funeral of a man who had contributed so much to the annexation of Savoy. Before being Republican, one can be French." In the inventory in 1931 Bertier's tomb was reported abandoned. It was not transferred when the Paradis cemetery was moved in the early 1950s.

== Publications ==
- Charles Bertier (1859), La Savoie doit-elle être française ? [Must Savoy become French?] (brochure), Paris: Dentu, p. 31

== Sources ==
- BERTIER Charles (in French), CTHS: Comité des travaux historiques et scientifiques
- "BERTIER, Charles Pierre", Base Léonore (in French), Archives nationales
- Cagnoli, Sebastien, Territoires transalpins - Savoie (in French)
- Cahoun, Ben, "Martinique", Worldstatesmen.org
- Dacquin, Monique (2018), Ces Chambériens qui ont opté pour le Piémont en 1860 (in French), Société Savoisienne d'Histoire et d'Archéologie
- Descotes (1924), Suppression des départements (in French)
- Martinique (1868), Bulletin officiel de la Martinique (in French), Bureau de l'imprimerie du gouvernement
- Pin, Jacques (18 April 2018), Plaidoyer pour la Cour d'Appel de Chambéry (PDF) (in French), Académie des Sciences, Belles-Lettres et Arts de Savoie
- Pittard, Claire (15 July 2016), "Dates importantes en SAVOIE", 100% Savoie (in French)
- Sorrel, Christian (2006), La Savoie, la France, l'Italie. Lettres d'Albert Blanc à François Buloz, 1858-1861, Éditions de l'université de Savoie, ISBN 978-2-915797-13-8
- Varenne, Charles : de La (1859), Lettres italiennes Victor-Emmanuel 2. et le Piémont en 1858 par Charles de La Varenne (in French), Librairie Nouvelle
- Saint-Genis, Victor de (1869), Histoire de la Savoie: d'après les documents originaux; depuis les origines les plus reculées jusqu'à l'annexion (in French), Bonne, Conte-Grand et Cie
