= François-Théodore de Lapelin =

French naval officer

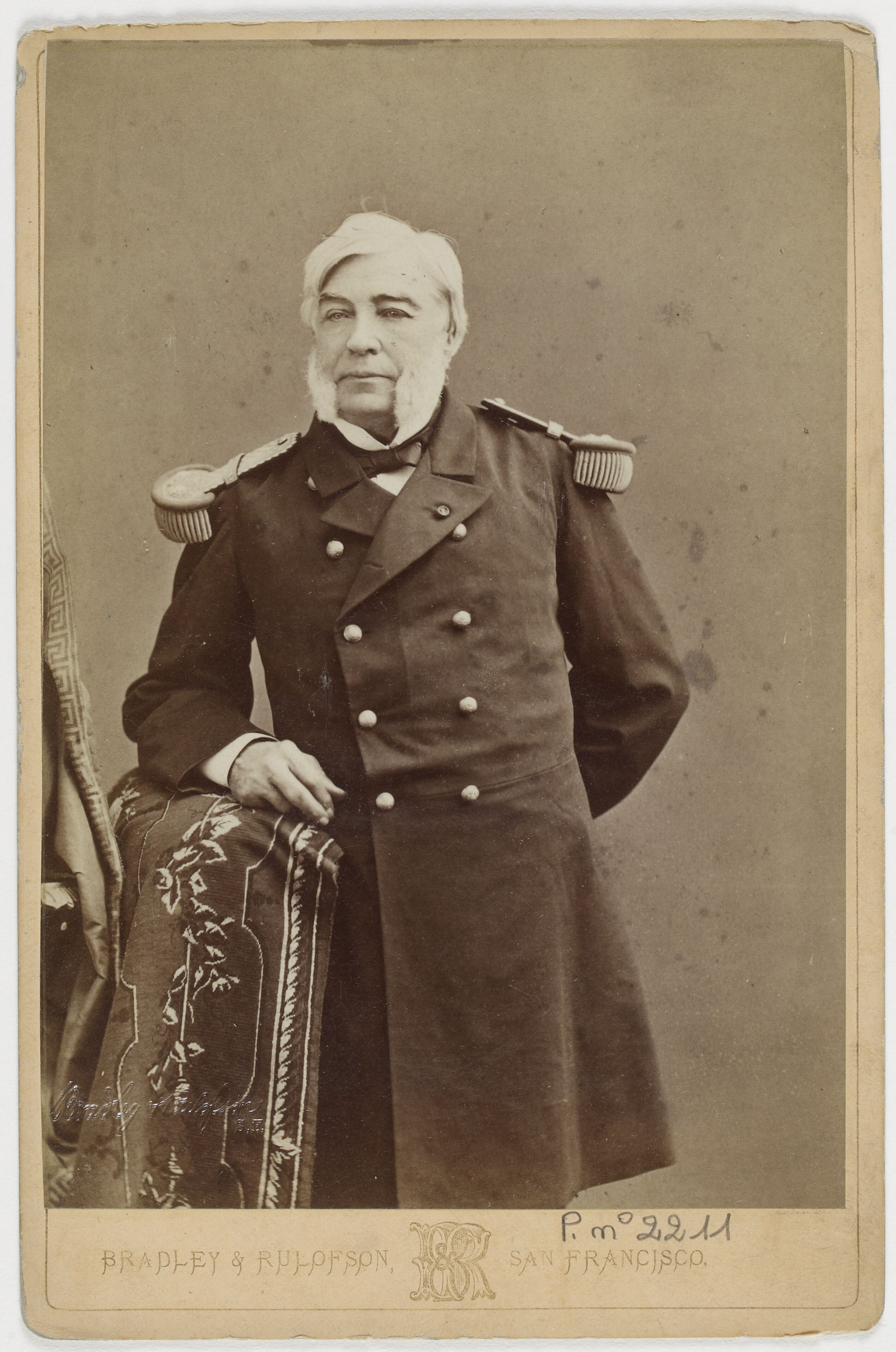

Governor of Martinique
- In office April 1864 – January 1867
- Preceded by: Antoine Marie Ferdinand de Maussion de Candé
- Succeeded by: André César Vérand (acting); Charles Bertier

Personal details
- Born: 11 December 1812 Buxières-sous-Montaigut, Puy-de-Dôme, France
- Died: 12 January 1888 (aged 75) Paris, France
- Occupation: Naval officer

François-Théodore de Lapelin (11 December 1812 – 12 January 1888) was a French naval officer who rose to the rank of Rear admiral. He was Governor of Martinique from 1864 to 1867.

== Life ==
=== Early years (1812–41) ===
François-Théodore de Lapelin was born on 11 December 1812 in Buxières-sous-Montaigut, Puy-de-Dôme. His parents were Jean Baptiste Augustin de Lapelin (born 1771) and Anne Thérèze Delagrange. His father was a Knight of the Order of Saint Louis and head of a cavalry squadron. François-Théodore was the youngest of three boys. He joined the navy, became an Aspirant (midshipman) 2nd class on 17 October 1829, and was promoted to Aspirant 1st class on 16 July 1831. He served in Brazil, the Mediterranean and North Africa. He was promoted to Enseigne de vaisseau (Ensign) on 6 January 1834.

=== Lieutenant and Captain (1841–69) ===
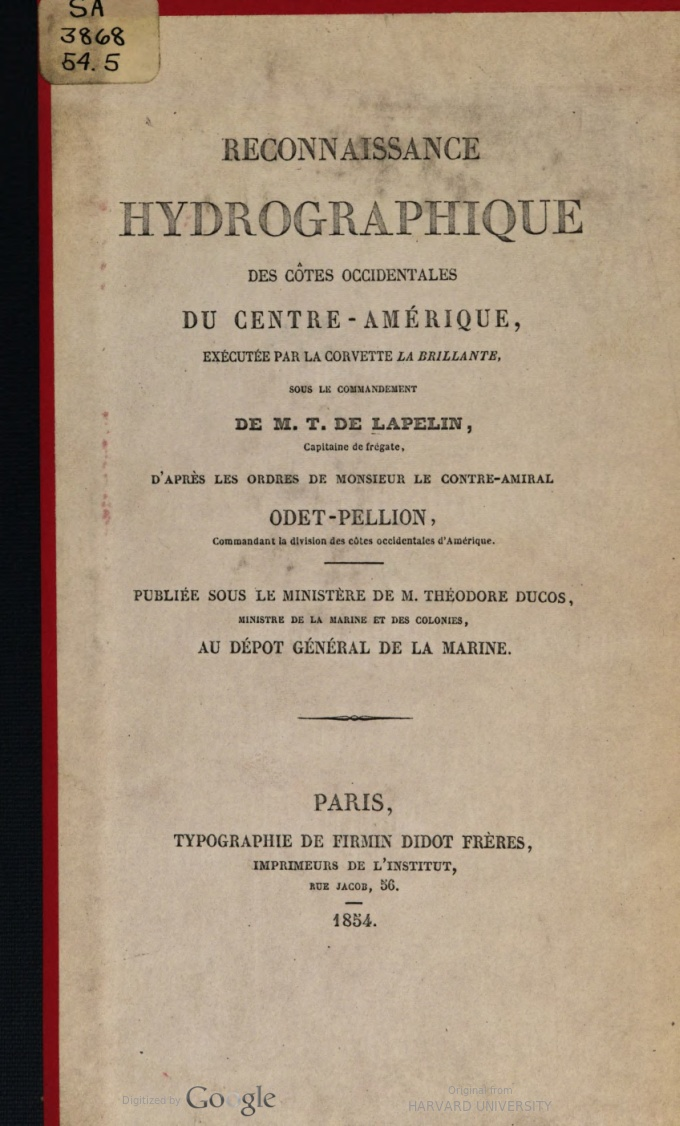
Reconnaissance hydrographique des côtes occidentales du Centre Amérique (1854)

De Lapelin was promoted to Lieutenant de vaisseau (Ship-of-the-line lieutenant) on 6 December 1841. In the 1840s he was in command of actions in the Philippines against pirates. He was made a Knight of the Legion of Honour on 8 January 1845, and Officer of the Legion of Honour on 11 November 1848. De Lapelin was promoted to Capitaine de frégate (Frigate captain) on 18 December 1848. In 1851 he commanded one of the ships of the Pacific Ocean Naval Division (DNOP) in the South Pacific, and visited Rio de Janeiro. He published an account of his survey of the west coast of Central America in his Reconnaissance hydrographique des côtes occidentales du Centre Amérique, exécutée par la corvette la Brillante (1854). He participated in naval operations of the Crimean War (1853–1856).

After the war de Lapelin again served in the Pacific and in the China Sea. He was promoted to Capitaine de vaisseau (Ship-of-the-line captain) on 30 July 1857. He was with Admiral Léonard Charner when he arrived in Saigon, then capital of the French colony of Cochinchina, on 7 February 1861. Lapelin commanded 1,000 naval fusiliers in the relief of the Siege of Saigon. He was made a Commander of the Legion of Honour on 22 April 1861.

De Lapelin was governor of Martinique from 15 July 1864 to January 1867. He replaced André César Vérand, who had been acting for Antoine Marie Ferdinand de Maussion de Candé since 29 January 1863. He was succeeded by André César Vérand as acting governor, then on 22 February 1867 by Louis Auguste Bertier. After leaving Martinique he served in Newfoundland. On 1 January 1869 he was commander in chief of the South of France Coastal Division.

=== Admiral (1869–88) ===
De Lapelin was promoted to Contre-Amiral (Rear admiral) on 24 May 1869. In 1870 he succeeded Georges Charles Cloué as commander of the Pacific Fleet. There were few French people in central Oceania at this time apart from Marist missionaries. Most trade was handled by Godeffroy, a German company, or by the English. In 1872 de Lapelin observed that, "It is through the Missions of central Oceania that the indigenes know France, because we do no business there, and our citizens, other than the missionary fathers and brothers, are extremely rare." However, the French were engaged in a competition with the European powers and the United States to take control of as many islands as possible.

In 1872 de Lapelin visited Easter Island ( l’île de Pâques, now Rapa Nui) on the ship La Flore. Pierre Loti was a midshipman on the vessel. DeLapelin collected a beautifully carved Moai head from Cook Bay (Hanga Roa, now held in the Musée du quai Branly. He gave an estimate in 1872 that the island had 175 inhabitants. The population had been much higher but had been devastated by smallpox, and some of the men had been taken to Peru as slaves. Five year later Alphonse Pinart estimated that there were just 110 inhabitants.

De Lapelin was made a Grand Officer of the Legion of Honour on 5 March 1874. The decoration was presented on 27 April 1874 by Vice-Admiral Charles de Dompierre d'Hornoy, Minister of the Navy.. He died on 12 January 1888 at the age of 75. He is buried in the 6th division of Montparnasse Cemetery in Paris.

== Publications ==
- Lapelin, Françios Théodore de (1854), Reconnaissance hydrographique des côtes occidentales du Centre Amérique, exécutée par la corvette la Brillante, sous le commandement de M.T. de Lapelin (in French), Paris: Le ministère de M. Théodore Ducos / Typ. de F. Didot frères
- De Lapelin, F.-T. (1872), "L'Ile de Pâque", La Revue Maritime et Coloniale: 105–125 and 526–544

== Sources ==
- Aldrich, Robert (1989-06-18), The French Presence in the South Pacific, 1842–1940, Palgrave Macmillan UK, ISBN 978-1-349-09084-6
- Brébion, Antoine (1935), Dictionnaire de bio-bibliographie générale, ancienne et moderne de l'Indochine française, publié après la mort de l'auteur (PDF) (in French), Antoine Cabaton
- Cahoon, Ben, "Martinique", World statesmen.org
- Cauwe, Nicolas (2011), Megaliths of Easter Island, Sion, Switzerland: Archaeopress
- Garric, Alain, "François Théodore DE LAPELIN", Geneanet
- Landru, Philippe (28 October 2013), "Montparnasse (75) : tombeaux remarquables de la 6ème division", Cimetières de France et d’ailleurs (in French)
- "Lapelin de, François Théodore", Base Léonore (in French), Archives nationales
- Magny, Ludovic de (vicomte) (1858), Le nobiliaire universel: ou, Recueil général des généalogies historiques et veridiques des maisons nobles de l'Europe (in French), Institut Heraldique
- Muñoz, Diego (October 2013), "Les Rapanui à Tahiti. Histoire de migration, de terres et de parenté" (PDF), E Toile Pacifique (in French), Paris, halshs-00905507v2
