= Glenburnie (1840 ship) =

History

United Kingdom
- Name: Glenburnie
- Builder: Prince Edward Island
- Launched: 1840
- Fate: Run down July 1843

General characteristics
- Tons burthen: 238 (bm)
- Sail plan: Barque

Glenburnie was launched in Prince Edward Island in 1840. She first appeared in Lloyd's Register (LR) in 1841. She traded between England and Quebec and was lost in 1843.

Year	Master	Owner	Trade	Source & notes
1841	W.Day	T.Chanter	Bideford-Quebec	LR; homeport of Bideford
1843	W.Day	T.Chanter	Bideford-Quebec	LR; homeport of Bideford

On 27 July 1843 Glenburnie collided with Lochlibo and foundered in the Atlantic Ocean. Her crew were rescued. She was on a voyage from Bridgwater to Quebec City. The Times mistakenly named her as Glenbervie. However, the entry for Glenburnie in the 1843 volume of Lloyd's Register carries the annotation "Run down".

A later article in The Times was more correct. It reported that Lochliboo had run down Glenburnie, of Bideford, on 26 July, near "Cape de Montez". Glenburnie had been carrying coal to Quebec. She sank almost immediately, but her crew was saved and brought to Bridgewater.
