= Kamiesch =

Sea inlet and adjoining port in the Crimean peninsula

Kamiesch (Ukrainian: Комишова бухта; Crimean Tatar: Qamış Körfezi) is a sea inlet and adjoining port, sited on the Chersonese or Khersones peninsula, three miles SW of the city centre of Sevastopol and ten miles WNW of Balaklava in the Crimean Peninsula. During the Crimean War, French invading forces used the bay as their main port and supply base. The area is now part of the Gagarinsky district of Sevastopol.

== History ==
In September 1854, prior to landing at Gulf of Kalamita, French and British forces identified Kamiesch and Balaclava as suitable supply ports for the siege of Sevastopol. Lord Raglan, given first choice, opted for Balaclava, leaving Kamiesch to the French. Historians see this as disastrous; The French had the larger sea inlet, with mooring for 300 vessels in the outer harbor, and were closer to their objective. They were also protected on both flanks; the sea on the left, the British on the right; whereas Raglan's right flank was exposed to the enemy. The French occupied Kamiesch on 1 October and proceeded to establish a large town with storehouses, bars, brothels, hotels, restaurants and shops.

== See also ==
- Crimean War
