= Auguste Léopold Protet =

French Navy admiral

Auguste Léopold Protet (Chinese: 卜羅德; 1808 – 1862) was a French Navy admiral. He fought in the Second Opium War, and was killed in the Taiping Rebellion at the Fengxian District of Shanghai on the afternoon of 17 May 1862.

He was born at Saint-Servan, France, and at sixteen he was admitted into the naval school of Angoulême. When he was 38, he received the commission of captain in the royal navy. At this time the British and French governments combined their efforts to put an end to the slave trade on the African coast, and Protet was employed in that service. After cruising three years on the coast of Africa he was appointed governor of Senegal, where he remained from 1850 to 1855. He served during the war with China, and was promoted to the rank of rear-admiral. He subsequently joined the expedition against the Taiping, who threatened an attack upon Shanghai, and he was killed during the engagement at Nanjao (南橋). The French troops massacred 3,000 men, women and children in a nearby Chinese village in revenge for his death.

The French aviso (corvette) Protet (F742) was named after him and saw active service until the 1980s.

== See also ==
- Battle of Shanghai (1861)
