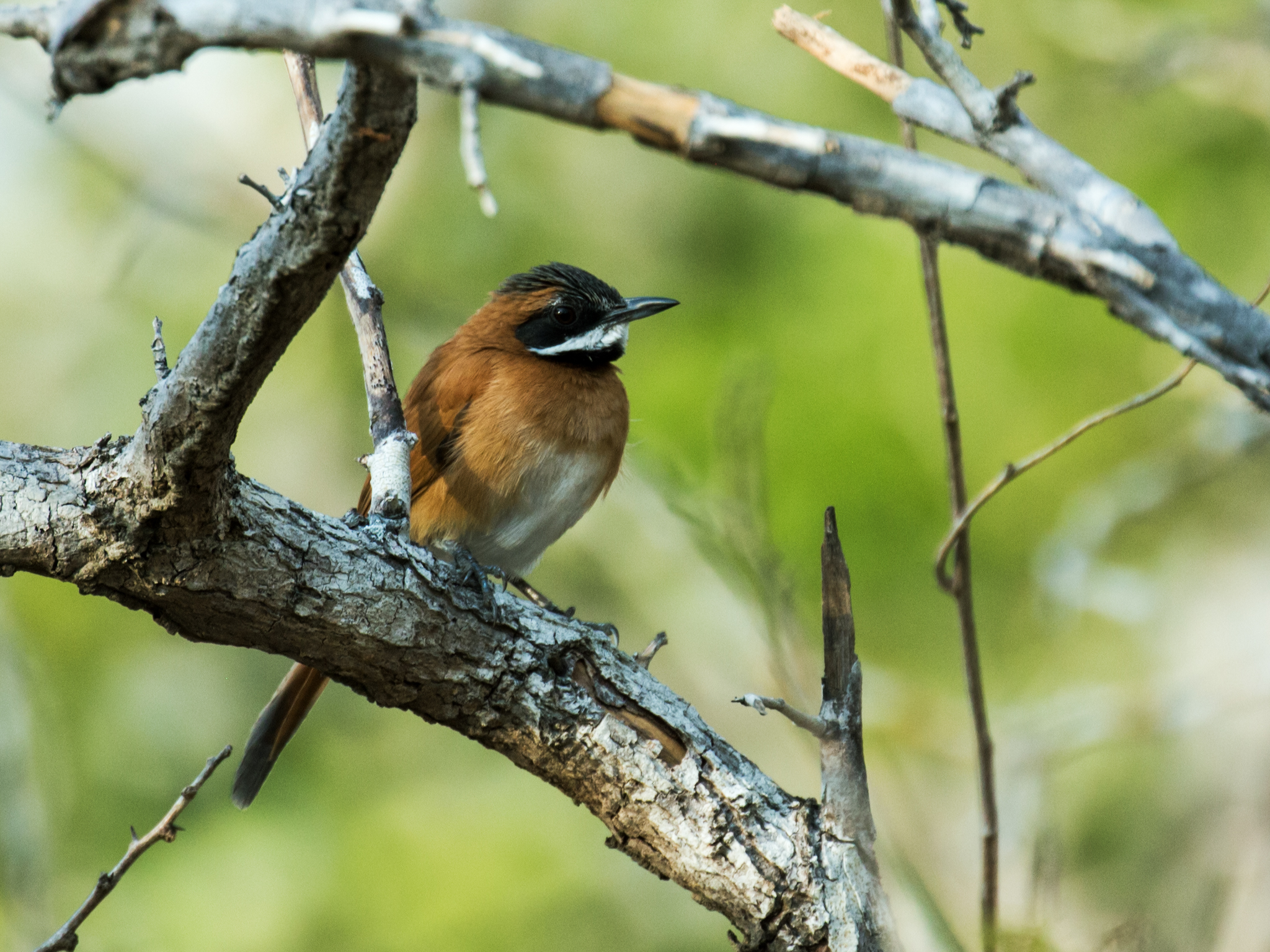

Conservation status
- Least Concern (IUCN 3.1)

Scientific classification
- Kingdom: Animalia
- Phylum: Chordata
- Class: Aves
- Order: Passeriformes
- Family: Furnariidae
- Genus: Synallaxis
- Species: S. candei

Binomial name
- Synallaxis candei d'Orbigny & Lafresnaye, 1838

= White-whiskered spinetail =

Species of bird

The white-whiskered spinetail (Synallaxis candei) is a species of bird in the Furnariinae subfamily of the ovenbird family Furnariidae. It is found in Colombia and Venezuela.

== Taxonomy and systematics ==
The white-whiskered spinetail was originally described in genus Synallaxis. In the early twentieth century some authors moved it into the newly created genus Poecilurus. By 2000 the merger of Poecilurus into Synallaxis was generally accepted and a study published in 2011 confirmed that placement. That study also established that the white-whiskered spinetail and the rufous-breasted spinetail (S. erythrothorax) are sister species.

The white-whiskered spinetail has three subspecies, the nominate S. c. candei (d'Orbigny & Lafresnaye, 1838), S. c. atrigularis (Todd, 1917), and S. c. venezuelensis (Cory, 1913).

The white-whiskered spinetail's specific epithet honors Admiral Antoine Marie Ferdinand de Maussion de Candé, an explorer of South America.

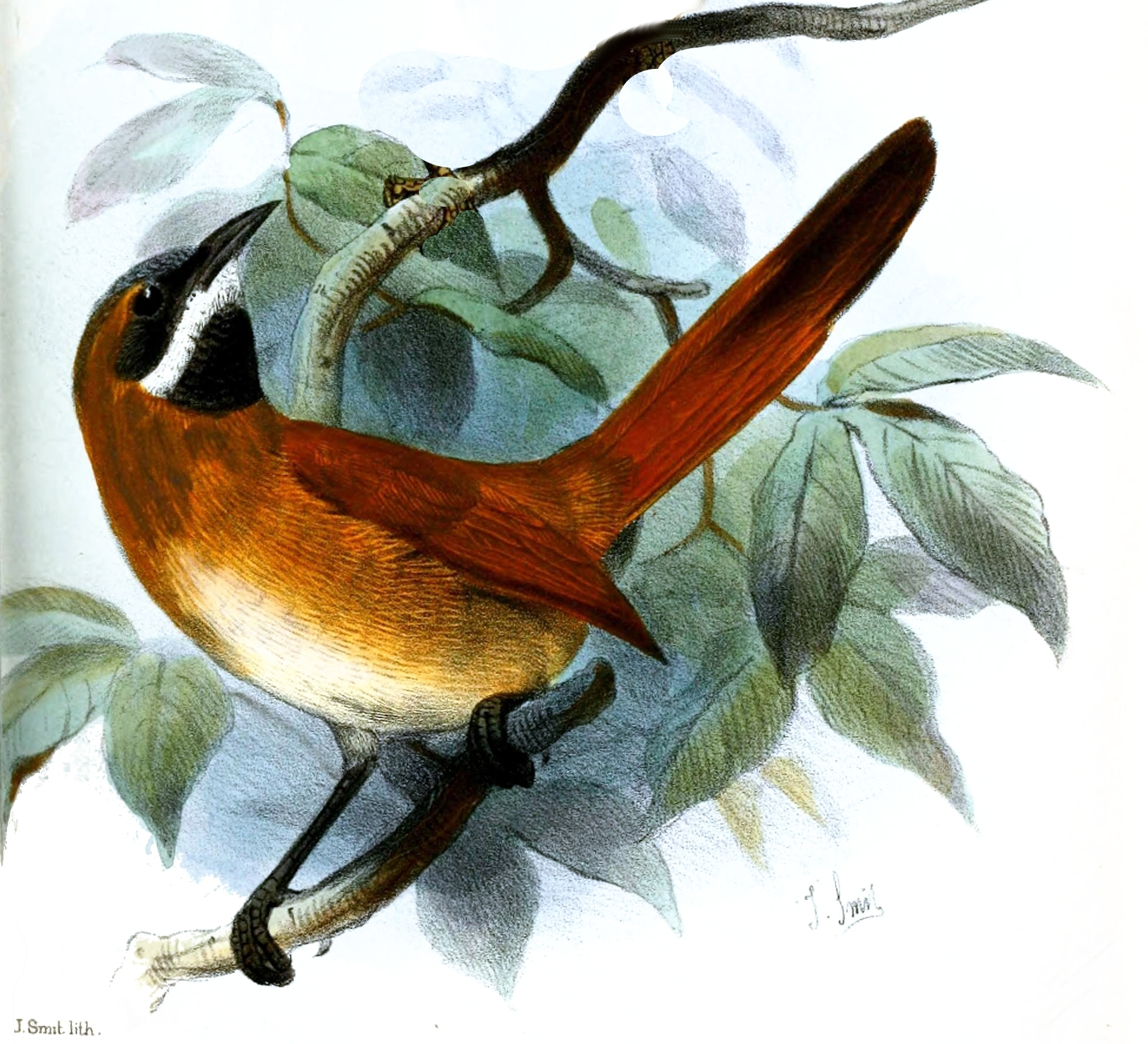
Illustration by Joseph Smit, 1874

== Description ==
The white-whiskered spinetail is 15 to 17 cm (5.9 to 6.7 in) long and weighs 14 to 16 g (0.49 to 0.56 oz). The sexes have the same plumage. Adults of the nominate subspecies have a wide white "moustache" and a wide rufous supercilium on an otherwise blackish face. Their crown is dark gray mottled with black and their nape, back, rump and uppertail coverts bright rufous. Their wings are bright rufous with dusky tips on their flight feathers. Their tail's proximal two-thirds is bright rufous and the distal third dark fuscous. Their chin is white and their throat black. Their breast and sides are bright rufous, their flanks slightly paler, their belly white, and their undertail coverts pale rufous. Their iris is dark brown, their maxilla black, their mandible black or blackish with some yellowish on its underside, and their legs and feet slate-gray to blue-gray. Subspecies S. c. atrigularis has a brown back, with no supercilium, grayish white flecks on the black cheek and chin, a dusky chestnut base to the tail, and a duller breast and more olivaceous flanks than the nominate.S. c. venezuelensis is paler overall than the nominate, with a white throat with a black band below it and a sharper delineation between the tail's colors.

== Distribution and habitat ==
The nominate subspecies of the white-whiskered spinetail is found in northern Colombia's Sucre and Magdalena departments. Subspecies S. c. atrigularis is found in the middle reaches of the Magdalena River valley in northern Colombia. S. c. venezuelensis is found in far northern Colombia's Cesar and La Guajira departments and east into northwestern Venezuela as far as Falcón and Lara states.

The white-whiskered spinetail inhabits tropical deciduous forest, arid scrublands, overgrown pastures, and the edges of mangrove stands. In elevation it ranges from sea level to 300 m (1,000 ft) in Colombia and to 1,100 m (3,600 ft) in Venezuela.

== Behavior ==
=== Movement ===
The white-whiskered spinetail is a year-round resident throughout its range.

=== Feeding ===
The white-whiskered spinetail feeds on arthropods. It typically forages in pairs, gleaning prey mostly from the ground but also from twigs and branches up to about 2 m (7 ft) above the ground.

=== Breeding ===
The white-whiskered spinetail is thought to breed during the rainy season of October to January, and is thought to be monogamous. Its nest is a mass of thorny sticks about twice as long as it is wide and high with a tunnel entrance near the top. The nest's exterior is "thatched" with smaller twigs and bark. The inner chamber's bottom is lined with leaves and sometimes snake skins. It is typically placed in a thorny bush between 1.3 and 2.5 m (4 and 8 ft) above the ground. The clutch size is three to four eggs. The incubation period, time to fledging, and details of parental care are not known.

=== Vocalization ===
The white-whiskered spinetail's song has four notes of which the middle two are stronger, a repeated "nasal 'a-dít-dít-du' ". Its call is "a nasal 'paa-pip' " and it renders "a nasal 'naaaa' " when alarmed.

== Status ==
The IUCN has assessed the white-whiskered spinetail as being of Least Concern. It has a fairly large range; its population size is not known but is believed to be stable. No immediate threats have been identified. It is considered fairly common to common.
