= Louis Henri de Gueydon =

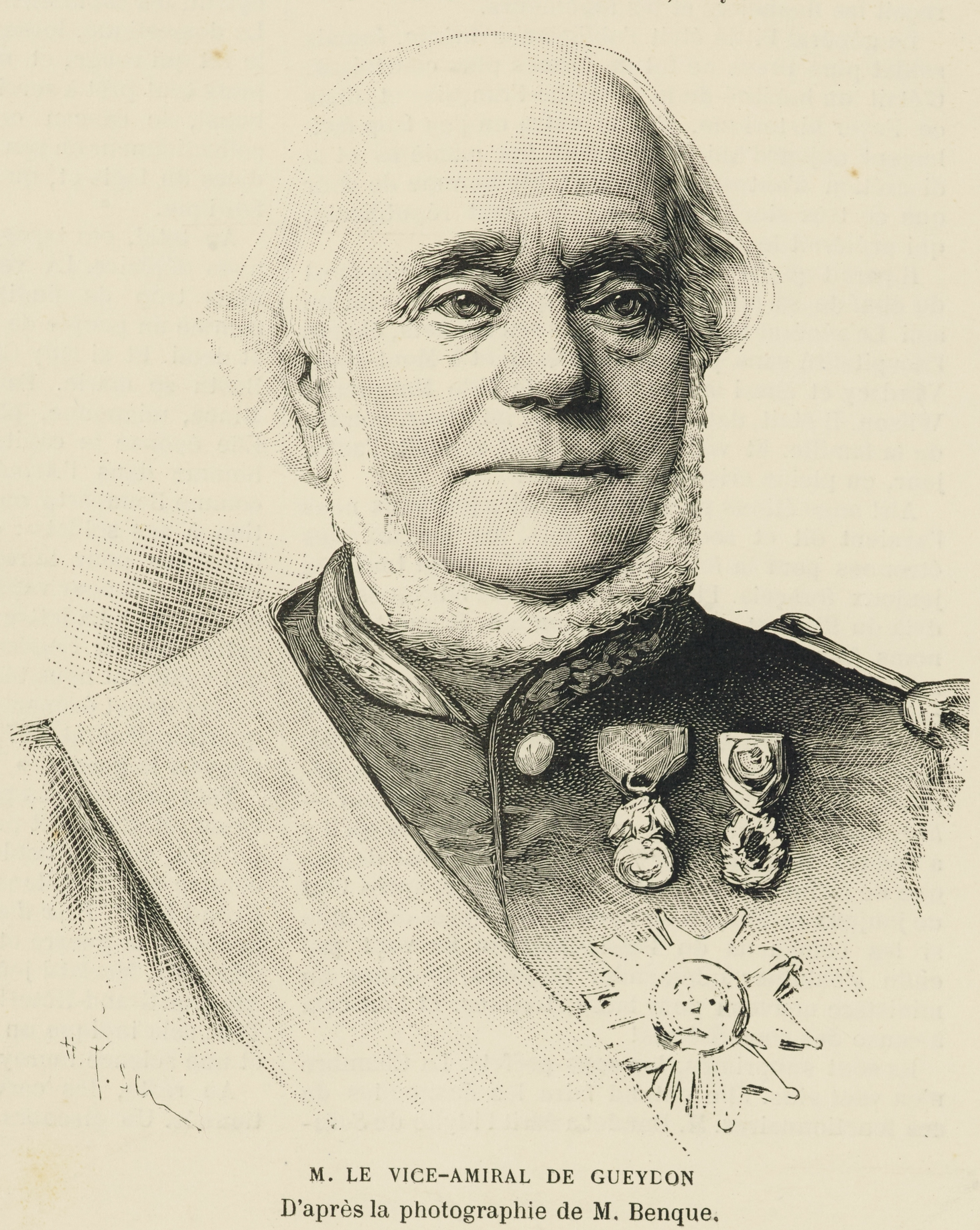

Governor of Martinique
- In office 15 June 1853 – September 1856
- Preceded by: Auguste-Nicolas Vaillant; Jacques Brunot (acting)
- Succeeded by: Louis André Lagrange (acting); Armand Louis Joseph de Fitte de Soucy

Governor of Algeria
- In office 21 March 1871 – 10 June 1873
- Preceded by: Alexis Lambert
- Succeeded by: Antoine Chanzy

Deputy for Manche
- In office 4 October 1885 – 1 December 1886

Personal details
- Born: 22 November 1809 Granville, Manche, France
- Died: 1 December 1886 (aged 77) Kerlaran, Landerneau, Finistère, France
- Occupation: Naval officer

Louis Henri, comte de Gueydon (22 November 1809 – 1 December 1886) was a vice admiral in the French Navy, and the first governor of Algeria under the Third Republic.

== Family ==
De Gueydon was born in Granville, Manche. His family were nobles of Italian extraction. His son Paul de Gueydon also became a vice-admiral; his son-in-law Auguste de Penfentenyo became a counter admiral; his grandson Hervé de Penfentenyo became a vice-admiral and won the Grand Croix of the Légion d'honneur.

== Naval career ==
De Gueydon came third in the entrance exam for the naval school at Angoulême in 1823; he graduated first in his class. On 31 December 1830 became an ensign on the brig Faucon off the coast of Brazil. He was made governor of Martinique in 1853, and Maritime Prefect of Lorient in 1858 and Brest in 1859. In 1861 he was promoted to vice-admiral and replaced Louis Édouard Bouët-Willaumez as commander of the escadre d'évolution, for exercises). In 1863 he became vice-president of the consultative committee for the colonies and president of the admiralty council. After the fall of the Second Empire in September 1870, the naval minister in the Government of National Defense, admiral Léon Martin Fourichon, split the North Sea fleet and gave De Gueydon command of one half. On 28 January 1871, he received the Grand Croix of the Légion d'honneur.

== Political career ==
On 29 March 1871, De Gueydon was named civil governor of French Algeria, which had been in revolt for several months. He declared martial law across much of the colony and used severe measures to suppress the revolt. He compared the Kabyles to the Communards of Paris and advised, "Agir comme à Paris; on juge et on désarme". A decree of 14 September partly abolished the "Arab bureaus", reordered the administration of Kabylie, and reorganised 100,000 hectares of land for the influx of colonising refugees from Alsace-Lorraine. On his advice, title would be granted to colonists who engaged to reside on the land for nine years. In 1872 he summed up the political situation: "We must face the fact, that what the politicians and most of the colonists want, is the dominance of those elected by the French population, and the crushing, the enslavement even, of the native population."

In the 1885 legislative election, De Gueydon was elected from Manche to the National Assembly as a Royalist. He had failed to be elected to the Senate earlier that year.

== Works ==
- "Cóte Occidentale de l'Amérique Méridionale: Exploration des Îles Galapagos en Août et Septembre 1846 [West Coast of South America: Exploration of the Galapagos Islands in August and September 1846]", Revue Coloniale [Colonial Revue] (in French), vol. XIII, Paris: Royal Imprimery, December 1847, pp. 349–398.
- La vérité sur la Marine, 1849
- Organisation du personnel à bord, 1852
- Tactique navale, 1867
- L'équité politique, 1871

== Namesakes ==
- Azeffoun in Algeria was formerly named Port-Gueydon
- Gueydon, an armoured cruiser, was launched in 1899.
