= Ulvesund Lighthouse =

Coastal lighthouse in Norway

Ulvesund Lighthouse Ulvesund Hjertneset Range Front
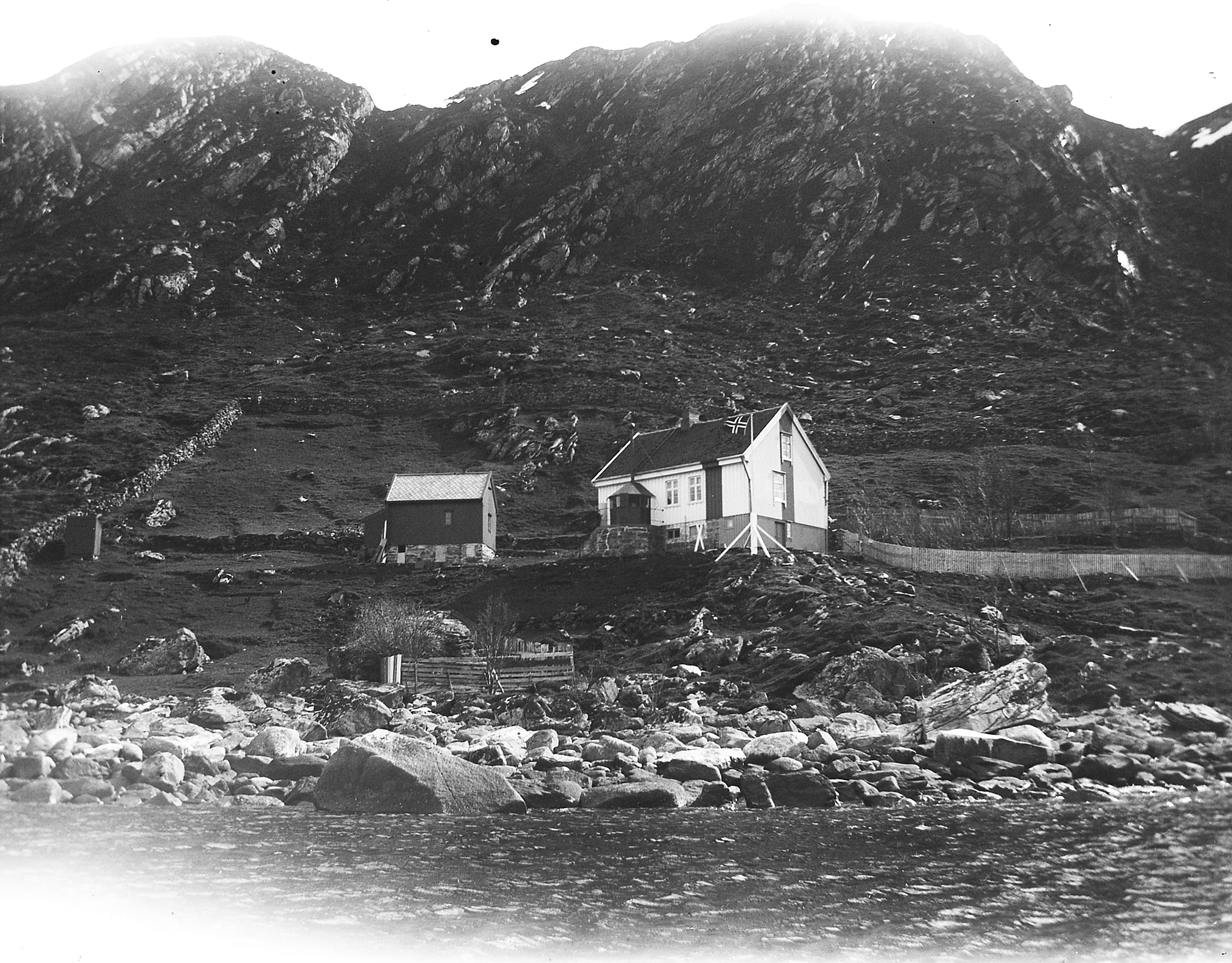
- Location: Kinn Municipality; Vestland county Norway
- Coordinates: 61°59′N 5°10′E

Tower
- Constructed: 1870 (first)
- Construction: concrete tower (current)
- Automated: 1985
- Height: 10 m (33 ft)
- Shape: cylindrical tower with balcony and lantern (current) lantern attached to the front keeper's house (first)
- Markings: white tower, red lantern roof white lantern with a red vertical stripe (first)

Light
- First lit: 1985 (current)
- Deactivated: 1985 (first)
- Focal height: 13 m (43 ft)
- Intensity: 25,800 cd
- Range: white: 10 nautical miles (19 km; 12 mi) red: 8 nautical miles (15 km; 9.2 mi) green: 7 nautical miles (13 km; 8.1 mi)
- Characteristic: Oc(3) WRG 10s

Ulvesund Lighthouse (Norwegian: Ulvesund fyr) is a coastal lighthouse located in Kinn Municipality in Vestland county, Norway. It is located on the mainland coast along the Ulvesundet strait.

== History ==
It was first lit in 1870 and automated in 1985. The lighthouse is owned by the Norwegian Coastal Administration, and run by Sølvi Helen Hopland Aemmer; It is used as cultural cafe and lodging house.

The 10-metre (33 ft) tall, slender, round, cylindrical, concrete tower is painted white and the lantern roof is red. The light can be seen for up to 10.7 nautical miles (19.8 km; 12.3 mi), and it emits a white, red, or green light, depending on direction, occulting three times every 10 seconds. It was restored in 2003 and then it became open to the public on 8 October 2003.

== See also ==
- List of lighthouses in Norway
- Lighthouses in Norway
