= Glenbervie (1815 ship) =

19th-century British sailing ship

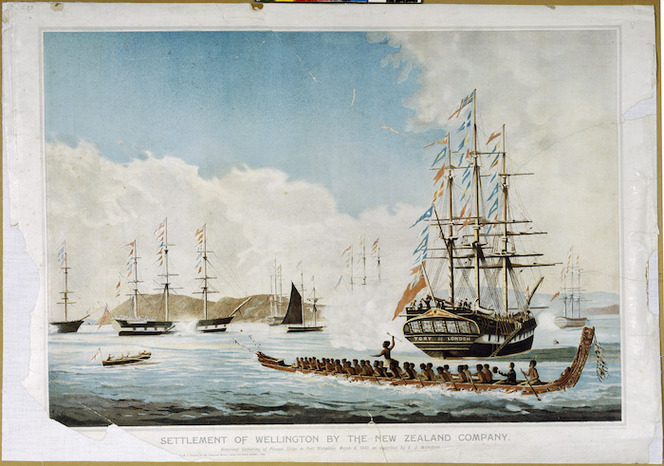
- Glenbervie, Adelaide, and Tory arriving at Port Nicholson on 8 March 1840

History

United Kingdom
- Name: Glenbervie
- Namesake: Glenbervie
- Builder: Port Glasgow
- Launched: 1815
- Fate: Burnt 6 August 1860

General characteristics
- Tons burthen: 388, or 391 (bm)
- Length: 105 ft 4 in (32.1 m)
- Beam: 29 ft 5 in (9.0 m)
- Depth: 13 ft 3 in (4.0 m)
- Sail plan: Barque

Glenbervie was launched at Glasgow in 1815. Initially she was a constant trader between Greenock and Demerara. In 1839, the New Zealand Shipping Company chartered her to carry supplies to support immigration to New Zealand. In the 1840s and 1850s, she traded more widely, sailing to Australia, the Caribbean, and South America. A fire destroyed her in August 1860.

== Career ==
Glenbervie first appeared in Lloyd's Register (LR) in 1815. For the next 20 or so years she sailed between Greenock and Demerara.

Year	Master	Owner	Trade	Source & notes
1815	Evans	Douglas Co.	Greenock–Demerara	LR
1820	J.Jones	Douglas Co.	Greenock–Demerara	LR
1825	J.Jones	Douglas Co.	Greenock–Demerara	LR; good repair 1821; small repair 1824

On 19 October 1826, as Glenbervie was returning to Greenock from Demerara, a privateer schooner under the Colombian flag fired at Glenbervie in 24°N 56°W. The privateer hailed Glenbervie, demanding to know where she was coming from and where she was bound. The privateer then permitted her to proceed but remained in sight until the 22nd. Glenbervie arrived at Greenock on 15 November.

Year	Master	Owner	Trade	Source & notes
1830	J.Jones	Douglas & Co.	Greenock–Demerara	LR; good repair 1821; small repairs 1824 & 1826
1835	Jones			LR

Glenbervie sailed for New Zealand in 1839, under Captain William Black. She was among a group of ships that the New Zealand Shipping Company had chartered to carry settlers. The other four vessels in the group with Glenbervie, which was serving to carry stores, were Adelaide, Aurora, Bengal Merchant, and Duke of Roxburgh. Glenbervie sailed from London on 2 October 1839. The vessels were to rendezvous at Port Hardy on Durville Island on 10 January 1840; at the rendezvous they were told their final destination. Glenburnie arrived at Port Nicholson on 7 March 1840, in the company of Tory and Adelaide. Glenbervie was carrying the Manager, clerks, and a well-lined safe which was used to set up a branch of the Union Bank of Australia, New Zealand's first bank. In total she carried seven settlers.

Glenbervie sailed to the Pacific, Caribbean, and South America during the 1840s and 1850s.

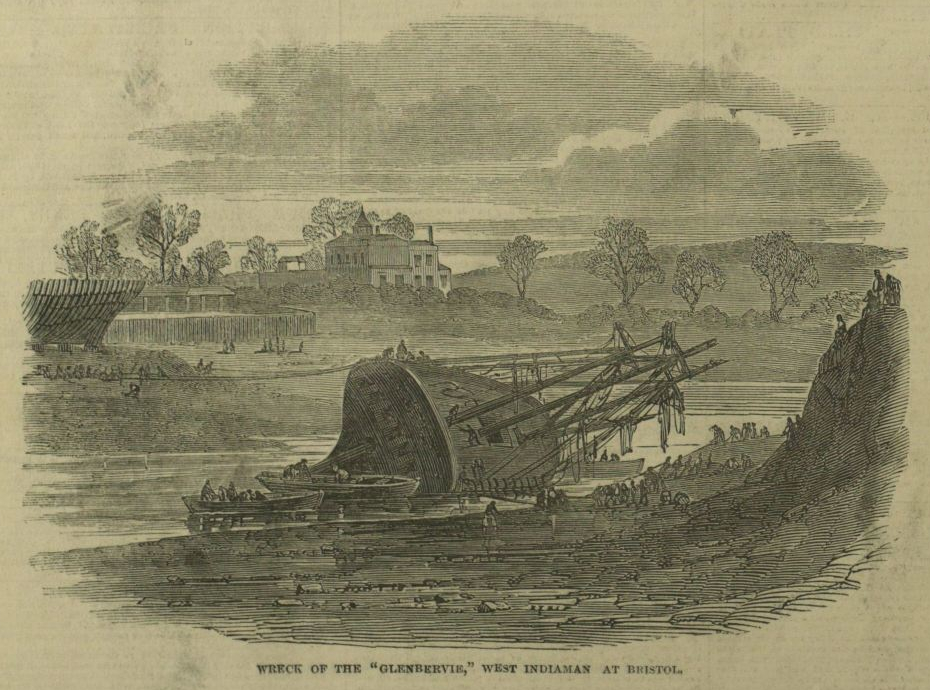
Wreck of the Glenbervie, West Indiaman at Bristol, 23 December 1848

She was wrecked on 23 December 1848, salvaged, and repaired the following January at Bristol. The Illustrated London News reported:

On Saturday morning, the 23rd, the ship Glenbervie, 380 tons register, left Bathurst Basin, Bristol, for the purpose of proceeding to Newport, there to take in a cargo of coals on a return voyage to the Havannah. The captain at first took a pilot; but the crew being all his own countrymen, and not very readily understanding English, the pilot said he must have an assistant. The captain refused to comply, and the pilot, accordingly, would not undertake the charge of the vessel; when the captain told him that he might go ashore, for he (the captain) could manage without him. The pilot then left; but the captain had not got his vessel much below the toll-gate, when she took the mud off Acraman's works, and soon heeled over, losing her masts, and blocking up the navigation. Every effort was made to raise her, but, for a long time, without success; we learn, however, that she has since been raised, and taken into Cumberland Basin to repair. The charge for an assistant pilot would have been 3s. or 4s.: the expense of raising and repairing the Glenbervie will cost, probably, more than as many hundred pounds, to say nothing of the inconvenience and loss of time. The vessel was grounded on a slip of mud and stones, represented by the dark mass abreast of her. She remained fast, as the tide was falling rapidly: and when the tide had almost left her dry, she fell over; her masts broken off by contact with the opposite bank of the New Cut. It should be observed that she ought not to have been taken down this river, or rather the New Cut-which is not the usual channel for large vessels, but for coasters and small craft only.

— "Wreck of the Glenbervie, West Indiaman at Bristol". The Illustrated London News. Vol. 14, no. 352. 6 January 1849. p. 16.

The last sailing reported in Australian Newspapers was in 1859, when she sailed for Guam from Adelaide on 1 March, under Captain James Anderson.

Year	Master	Owner	Trade	Source & notes
1840	J.B.King	Russell & Co.	London–New Zealand	LR, large repairs 1830 & 1834; small repairs 1841
1845	J.Muddle; Russell	Russell & Co.	London–Hobart Town	LR, large repairs 1830 & 1834; small repairs 1842; damages repaired 1845
1850	Fullerton	Russell & Co.	Bristol–West Indies	LR, large repairs 1834; small repairs 1848; damages repaired 1849
1855	J.Anderson	Russell & Co.	London–Hobart Town	LR, large repairs 1834; small repairs 1851
1860	J.Anderson	Russell & Co.	Leith-South America	LR, large repairs 1834; small repairs 1851; large repair 1856

Note: The Times mistakenly reported that Glenbervie had been run down and sunk in July 1843. In a later story it reported that the vessel that had been lost was Glenburnie

== Fate ==
A fire off the Falkland Islands on 6 August 1860, destroyed Glenbervie; the British merchant ship Tigre rescued her crew. The crew were landed at Monte Video, Uruguay. Glenbervie was on a voyage from Glasgow to Valparaíso.
