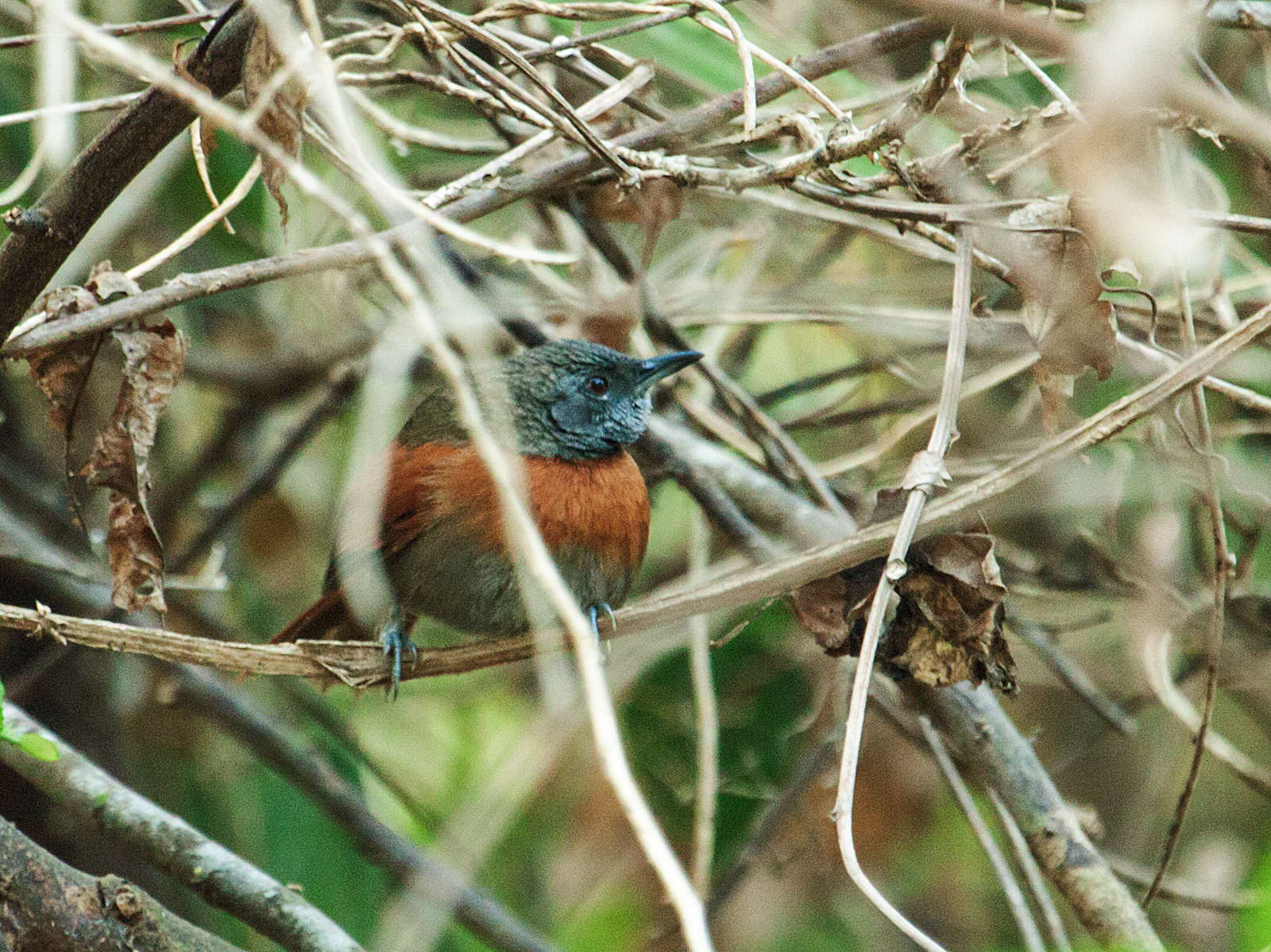

Conservation status
- Least Concern (IUCN 3.1)

Scientific classification
- Kingdom: Animalia
- Phylum: Chordata
- Class: Aves
- Order: Passeriformes
- Family: Furnariidae
- Genus: Synallaxis
- Species: S. erythrothorax

Binomial name
- Synallaxis erythrothorax Sclater, PL, 1855

= Rufous-breasted spinetail =

Species of bird

The rufous-breasted spinetail (Synallaxis erythrothorax) is a species of bird in the Furnariinae subfamily of the ovenbird family Furnariidae. It is found in Belize, El Salvador, Guatemala, Honduras, and Mexico.

== Taxonomy and systematics ==
The rufous-breasted spinetail's taxonomy is unsettled. The International Ornithological Committee and BirdLife International's Handbook of the Birds of the World assign it two subspecies, the nominate S. e. erythrothorax (Sclater, PL, 1855) and S. e. pacifica (Griscom, 1930). The Clements taxonomy adds a third, S. e. furtiva (Bangs & Peters, 1927), that the other two systems include within the nominate.

A study published in 2011 determined that the rufous-breasted spinetail and the white-whiskered spinetail (S. candei) are sister species.

This article follows the two-subspecies model.

== Description ==
The rufous-breasted spinetail is 13 to 16 cm (5.1 to 6.3 in) long and weighs 15 to 19 g (0.53 to 0.67 oz). The sexes have the same plumage. Adults of the nominate subspecies have a sepia brown face, crown, nape, back, rump and uppertail coverts. Their wings are chestnut with brown tips on their flight feathers. Their tail is chestnut brown; the feathers have black shafts. Their chin and upper throat are slate black with widish white streaks; their lower throat is solid slate black. Their breast and sides are deep cinnamon rufous, their flanks light brown, their belly mottled whitish or mouse gray with an olive tinge, and their undertail coverts a lighter, grayer, brown than the flanks. Their iris is dark red to reddish brown, their bill black (sometimes with a brownish base to the mandible), and their legs and feet bright gray to greenish gray. Juveniles have a similar pattern to adults with light brown upper breast, flanks, and undertail coverts and pale grayish lower breast and belly mottled with brown. Subspecies S. e. pacifica is overall paler than the nominate, with a gray (instead of black) lower throat and less olive on the flanks.

== Distribution and habitat ==
The rufous-breasted spinetail has a disjunct distribution. The nominate subspecies is the more widespread. It is found from Veracruz, northern Oaxaca, and the Yucatán Peninsula in Mexico south on the Caribbean side through Belize and Guatemala into northwestern Honduras. Subspecies S. e. pacifica is found from southwestern Chiapas in Mexico south on the Pacific side through Guatemala into El Salvador. The species inhabits a variety of landscapes characterized by dense vegetation. They include the edges of lowland evergreen forest, secondary forest, second-growth scrublands, brushy clearings, and swampy areas. In elevation it ranges from sea level to 1,250 m (4,100 ft) in Guatemala but only to 750 m (2,500 ft) elsewhere.

== Behavior ==
=== Movement ===
The rufous-breasted spinetail is a year-round resident throughout its range.

=== Feeding ===
The rufous-breasted spinetail feeds mostly on arthropods but also includes small berries in its diet. It usually forages singly or in pairs, gleaning prey from foliage and the ground in dense vegetation.

=== Breeding ===
The rufous-breasted spinetail's breeding season has not been fully defined but includes at least late March to September. Both members of a pair build the nest, a dome of thorny sticks that may be half again as long as it is high, with a tunnel entrance and a platform at the tunnel entrance. Its exterior is "thatched" with pieces of bark and stems of several leaf types. The inner chamber has a cup of grass and fine twigs. Most clutches are of three eggs but four are sometimes laid. The incubation period is 17 to 18 days and fledging occurs about 15 days after hatch. Both parents incubate the clutch and provision nestlings.

=== Vocalization ===
The rufous-breasted spinetail's song is "a nasal weet!-weet!-weet!-Wur'r'r'r'r'r". Other vocalizations are a "very high, rising slightly shrieking wrutuwit-wít-truw" and " a nasal, emphatic whit'chew". Its alarm call is a chatter or trill.

== Status ==
The IUCN has assessed the rufous-breasted spinetail as being of Least Concern. It has a large range and its estimated population of at least 50,000 mature individuals is believed to be stable. No immediate threats have been identified. "The impacts humans will have on the spinetail will depend on how much acceptable secondary habitat increases compared to the rates of complete deforestation, which is not tolerated by the bird."
