= French frigate Cléopâtre (1838) =

History

France
- Name: Cléopâtre
- Namesake: Cleopatra
- Builder: Charles Alexandre (with assistance from Joseph Daviel and Georges Allix from 1835)
- Laid down: 1 September 1827
- Launched: 23 April 1838
- Commissioned: 24 April 1838
- Decommissioned: 1 July 1838
- Ship recommissioned: 21 July 1842
- Ship struck: 31 December 1864
- Ship broken up: 1869

General characteristics
- Class & type: Artémise-class
- Displacement: 2,300 tonnes
- Length: 52.8 m (173 ft)
- Beam: 13.72 m (45.0 ft)
- Draught: 6.70 m (22.0 ft)
- Propulsion: Sail
- Complement: 441 men
- Armament: 28 × 30-pounder long guns; 18 × 30-pounder carronades; 4 × 16 cm shell-firing guns
- Armour: Timber

Cléopâtre was a 50-gun frigate of the Artémise class that served in the French Navy. Launched in 1838 after an almost 11-year period of construction, she was in commission for only three months during her transfer from Saint Servan to Brest. She was recommissioned in 1842. In 1843 the Cléopâtre rescued all 34 people aboard the Regular East Indiaman that had been abandoned during a voyage from London to Bombay. She sailed to Japan in 1846 in an attempt to open up trade with that country and served as a transport during the Crimean War of 1853–1856. She was used as a storage hulk after 1864 and broken up in 1869.

== Construction ==
The Artémise class of (largely) 52-gun frigates were design by Jean-Baptiste Hubert with the first vessel, Artémise launched in 1828 and the last Flore in 1869. The first vessels were sail-powered with later vessels steam-driven. The sail-powered Cléopâtre was constructed at Saint Servan by Charles Alexandre (with assistance from Joseph Daviel and Georges Allix from 1835). The keel was laid on 1 September 1827 and she was launched on 23 April 1838.

The Cléopâtre was commissioned on 24 April and completed in June. She sailed to Brest under tow from the steam corvette Tonnerre and was decommissioned on 1 July. The Cléopâtre recommissioned on 21 July 1842 at which point she was armed with 28 30-pounder long guns on her upper deck and 18 30-pounder carronades and 4 16cm shell-firing guns on her lower deck.

== Rescue of the Regular ==
On 12 July 1843 Cléopâtre rescued all 34 people from the Regular, a full-rigged East Indiaman that was forced to be abandoned whilst travelling between London and Bombay. The Regular had recently been lengthened by 14 feet and this alteration affected her structure, leading to her taking on large quantities of water in rough seas on her first voyage. She was caught in a storm on 7 July and hit by a freak wave the next day that tore off her starboard bulwarks. Despite constant manning of the pumps, water began filling the ship. The cargo was jettisoned but it proved impossible to save the vessel and those aboard abandoned ship into its pinnace, captain's gig and launch. A resurgence of bad weather washed almost all of the supplies out of the boats, the gig had to be abandoned, and the two remaining boats lost sight of each other. On 14 July a sail was sighted from the launch and a lady's shawl was hoisted as a signal of distress. The ship proved to be the Cléopâtre, travelling in company with the 20-gun Alcmène. The Cléopâtre responded to the distress signal and rescued those aboard the launch through her gunports, by hoisting them individually up her side and by hoisting the entire boat aboard. Commodore Roy, commanding on Cléopâtre directed the Alcmène to search for the missing pinnace, which she found and rescued all aboard. Commodore Roy provided clothing and food to the Regular's crew and passengers and diverted to Mauritius from his intended destination of the Isle of Bourbon (now Réunion) to allow them to be landed on British territory.

== Later career ==
She sailed to the Ryukyu Islands with two corvettes under Admiral Cécille in June 1846 and thence to Nagasaki where she arrived on 29 July as part of an attempt to open up trade relations with Japan. During the Crimean War (1853-56) Cléopâtre was temporarily reduced to 2 guns when configured en flûte for use as a transport vessel. She was struck from the navy list on 31 December 1864 and thereafter used as a storage hulk in Cherbourg. The vessel was broken up in 1869.
