= François Rolle de Laubière =

French soldier

Governor of Martinique (acting)
- In office 1667–1672
- Preceded by: Robert de Clodoré
- Succeeded by: Antoine André de Sainte-Marthe

Personal details
- Born: c. 1617
- Died: February 1672
- Occupation: Soldier

François Rolle, Sieur de Laubière (or François Rools de Loubières (Note: Rolle de Laubière was the early form of his name, written "Rolle de Laubier" in a document of 1 July 1658, but written "Rools de Loubières" by later sources.); c. 1617 – February 1672) was a French soldier who was acting governor of Martinique from 1667 to 1672. As a militia leader he helped defeat the indigenous Caribs and established full French control over the island.

== Family ==
François Rolle de Laubière was born around 1617, His parents were Jean Rolle, Sieur De Goursolas (died 3 July 1636), deputy prosecutor of the jurisdiction of Firbeix, and Marie de Lafon. His father became a king's judge at Courbefy, Haute-Vienne. His mother was the daughter of a notary. One of his brothers was Méderic Rolle de Gourselas (c. 1607–1664). He married Marie Elisabeth Beaujeu De La Haye, then married Françoise Dyel Du Parquet.

== Martinique ==
=== Du Parquet Property ===
François and Méderic Rolle (Laubière and Gourselas) arrived in Martinique in 1644 (Note: Another source says Rolle came to Martinique in 1642.) with Constant d'Aubigné. The governor of Martinique, Jacques Dyel du Parquet, appointed Gourselas Lieutenant General of the island on 22 November 1653.

Du Parquet died in Saint-Pierre on 3 January 1658 aged 52. After his death his wife Marie Bonnard du Parquet took charge of the island as regent in the name of her oldest son, Dyel d'Esnambuc. Laubière, who had married du Parquet's cousin, was appointed guardian of his children. A struggle began between two factions on the island, the Parisians led by Maubray and the Normans led by Plainville. Plainville was named procureur-syndic on 22 July 1658. While Maubray was absent in Antigua, Plainville arrested and imprisoned Mme du Parquet. After Mme du Parquet agreed to renounce the government, she was freed and restored to her property. Gourselas became in effect governor.

In September 1658 Gourselas formed a force of 600 militiamen to eliminate the last Island Caribs from the northern Capesterre region of the island. 200 were carried by sea in five ships under Laubière, 200 advanced by land around Mount Pelée and 200 by Morne des Gommiers. The Caribs were soon defeated by the overwhelming French forces and fled towards Dominica and Saint Vincent. Their villages were burned, and Laubière built a small fort on the north coats of Martinique to block their return. Many of the soldiers received land in return for their services and went on to found sugarcane plantation dynasties. The campaign was a decisive event in establishing full French control over the island.

On 15 September 1658 the King appointed du Parquet's infant son Governor and Lieutenant General of Martinique and Saint Lucia, with his uncle Adrien Dyel de Vaudroques to act in his place until he reached the age of 20. Vaudroques died on 24 October 1662, and Gourselas served as interim governor until 1663. Laubière led militia forces on Martinique when Gourselas was acting governor. The colonists proposed to the government that Vaudroques should be replaced either by one of the Rolle brothers, Gourselas or Laubière, or else by de la Forge or de Valmenieres. However, the king accepted the wish of the guardians of the du Parquet minors and appointed another relative, Jean Dyel de Clermont.

=== French West Indies Company ===
The French West Indies Company was formed in May 1664, and acquired the islands from the du Parquet heirs. Robert de Clodoré was named governor of Martinique on 11 October 1664 by the newly formed French West India Company (Compagnie des Indes Occidentales). Clodoré arrived in Martinique and took formal possession of the island on 19 February 1665.

During the Second Anglo-Dutch War, on 11 August 1666 Captain de Laubière arrived in Martinique with 120 reinforcements from France on the Saint Christophe. Laubière led a force of 400 men on four ships and two barks that reached Guadeloupe on 17 August 1666. In the afternoon they attacked a fleet of eight smaller English vessels under Henry Willoughby. Willoughby managed to escape with five of the English vessels, but the three largest ships and 200 Englishmen were captured. Next year the English admiral John Harman attacked the ships sheltering below the fortification of Saint-Pierre, Martinique on 29 June 1667, and would make repeated attacks over the days that followed, eventually sinking almost all the French ships before leaving on 11 July 1667. Laubiere directed the shore batteries under the command of Clodoré.

The Treaty of Breda was signed in July 1667, and Clodoré left the island in December of that year. He was succeeded in Martinique by Laubière as interim governor. The lieutenant general of the Antilles, Antoine Lefèbvre de La Barre, was replaced on 4 February 1669 by Jean-Charles de Baas as governor-general of the islands, based on Martinique. For three years Laubière governed under de Baas. Laubière died in Fort-Royal, Martinique in February 1672. He was succeeded as governor in December 1672 by Antoine André de Sainte-Marthe.

== Sources ==
- Anglo, Roger (2010), Martinique, Guyane, Guadeloupe, les raisons de la colère, les conditions du changement (in French), Harmattan, ISBN 978-2-296-10474-7
- Azorin, Patrick Jean Marie, "Méderic "Méry" ROLLE de GOURSOLAS (de)", Geneanet (in French)
- Banbuck, C.A. (1935), Histoire politique, économique et sociale de la Martinique sous l'Ancien Régime (in French), Paris: Marcel Revière
- Boucher, Philip P. (29 December 2010), France and the American Tropics to 1700: Tropics of Discontent?, JHU Press, ISBN 978-1-4214-0202-4
- Cahoon, Ben, "Martinique", WorldStatesmen.org
- Clément, Pierre; Brotonne, Pierre de (1865), Lettres, instructions et mémoires de Colbert (publiés d'après les ordres de l'empereur, sur la proposition de Son Excellence M. Magne, ministre secrétaire d'état des finances) (in French), Imprimerie impériale
- Guët, Isidore (1893), Origines de la Martinique. Le colonel François de Collart et la Martinique de son temps; colonisation, sièges, révoltes et combats de 1625 à1720, Vannes: Lafolye
- Jesse, C. (December 1967), "SOLD FOR A SONG: Du Parquet Buys St. Lucia, Together with Martinique, Grenada, the Grenadines, In A.D. 1650, for £1660 Sterling", Caribbean Quarterly, 13 (4), Taylor & Francis, Ltd., JSTOR 40653043
- Lampin, D., "Robert Le Fichot des Friches, sieur de Clodoré", La Martinique à la carte (in French)
- "L'histoire de la Martinique", Imago Mundi
- Margry, Pierre (1863), Origines transatlantiques: Belain d'Esnambuc et les Normands aux Antilles, d'après des documents nouvellement retrouvés (in French), A. Faure
- Margry, Pierre (1878), "Origines Francaises des Pays d'Outre-Mer", Revue maritime et coloniale (in French), Le Ministère
- Marley, David F. (2008), Wars of the Americas: A Chronology of Armed Conflict in the Western Hemisphere, 1492 to the Present, ABC-CLIO, ISBN 978-1-59884-100-8
- Mathout, Gérard, "François Rolle", Geneanet (in French)
- Roget, Jacques Petitjean, ed. (1975), Histoire de l’isle de Grenade en Amérique 1649-1659. (1659) (Manuscrit Anonyme de 1659) (in French), Texte établi par Élisabeth Crosnier, Montréal: Les Presses de l’Université de Montréal
- Rossignol, Bernadette; Rossignol, Philippe (April–May 2003), "Famille ROOLS de GOURSOLAS huit générations en Martinique, qui se terminent en 1902", Généalogie et Histoire de la Caraïbe (158–159)
