= Médéric Rolle de Goursolas =

French soldier

Médéric Rolle, sieur de Gourselas

Governor of Martinique
- In office 1662–1663
- Preceded by: Adrien Dyel de Vaudroques
- Succeeded by: Jean Dyel de Clermont

Personal details
- Born: 1615
- Died: 1664 (aged 48–49)
- Occupation: Soldier

Médéric Rolle de Goursolas, or Médéric Rools de Gourselas, (Note: The spelling "Rools" later prevailed over "Rolle".) (c. 1607–1664), was a French soldier who was active in the French colonies in the Antilles, and for a period was governor of Martinique. He organized the expedition that drove the last Caribs out of Martinique and destroyed their villages.

== Early years (1607–44) ==
Médéric (or Méry) Rools de Goursolas, esquire, lord of Goursolas in Firbeix, Dordogne, was born around 1607. His parents were Jean Rolle, lord of Goursolas, and Marie de Lafon. His father, a king's judge at Courbefy, Haute-Vienne, died on 3 July 1636. His mother was the daughter of a notary. His brother was François Rolle de Laubière, who later led militia forces on Martinique when Goursolas was acting governor.

== Martinique under du Parquet (1644–58) ==
Locations in the Lesser Antilles

Goursolas was aged 37 when he arrived in Martinique in 1644 (Note: Another source says Goursolas came to Martinique in 1642.) with Constant d'Aubigné. He was accompanied by his brother François Rolle de Loubière. At the end of 1652 the governor of Martinique, Jacques Dyel du Parquet, returned to France for health reasons. He left Goursolas in charge as Major during the minority of his son. On 24 February 1653 Goursolas married Jeanne Hurault, daughter of Claude Jacques Huralt, esquire, and Anne Vinet. Du Parquet appointed Goursolas Lieutenant General of the island on 22 November 1653.

== Acting governor (1658) ==
Du Parquet died in Saint-Pierre on 3 January 1658 aged 52. After his death his wife Marie Bonnard du Parquet took charge of the island as regent in the name of her oldest son, Dyel d'Esnambuc. François de Loubière, who had married du Parquet's cousin, was appointed guardian of his children. A struggle began between two factions on the island, the Parisians led by Maubray and the Normans led by Plainville. Plainville was named procureur-syndic on 22 July 1658. While Maubray was absent in Antigua, Plainville arrested and imprisoned Mme du Parquet. Goursolas presided over an assembly on 6 August 1658 in which various supporters of the Parisians were removed from office. Goursolas and Plainville signed the minutes of this meeting. After Mme du Parquet agreed to renounce the government, she was freed and restored to her property. Goursolas was in effect governor.

In September 1658 Goursolas formed a force of 600 militiamen to eliminate the last Island Caribs from the northern Capesterre region of the island. 200 were carried by sea in five ships under François de Loubière, 200 advanced by land around Mount Pelée and 200 by Morne des Gommiers. The Caribs were soon defeated by the overwhelming French forces and fled towards Dominica and Saint Vincent. Their villages were burned, and de Loubière built a small fort on the north coast of Martinique to block their return. Many of the soldiers received land in return for their services and went on to found sugarcane plantation dynasties. The campaign was a decisive event in establishing full French control over the island.

== Later career (1658–64) ==
On 15 September 1658 the King appointed du Parquet's son Governor and Lieutenant General of Martinique and Saint Lucia, with his uncle Adrien Dyel, sieur de Vaudroques to act in his place until he reached the age of 20. Goursolas was named Major and Lieutenant General of Martinique on 22 November 1658. Adrien Dyel died on 24 October 1662, and Goursolas served as interim governor until 1663, when he was replaced by Jean Dyel de Clermont. Médéric Rolle de Goursolas died in 1664. A census of families on Martinique in 1664 listed Madmoiselle Jeanne Herault (38), widow of the deceased Médéry Rolle, Escuyer, Sieur de Gourselas (Médéric Rools de Gourselas), and her children Émond Rolle (7), Adrien Rolle (6), Louis Rolle (5) and Madeleine Rolle (11 months). His wife died in Fort Royal on 15 April 1697.

== Sources ==
- Anglo, Roger (2010), Martinique, Guyane, Guadeloupe, les raisons de la colère, les conditions du changement (in French), Harmattan, ISBN 978-2-296-10474-7
- Azorin, Patrick Jean Marie, "Méderic "Méry" ROLLE de GOURSOLAS (de)", Geneanet (in French)
- Boucher, Philip P. (29 December 2010), France and the American Tropics to 1700: Tropics of Discontent?, JHU Press, ISBN 978-1-4214-0202-4
- Cahoon, Ben, "Martinique", WorldStatesmen.org
- Jesse, C. (December 1967), "SOLD FOR A SONG: Du Parquet Buys St. Lucia, Together with Martinique, Grenada, the Grenadines, In A.D. 1650, for £1660 Sterling", Caribbean Quarterly, 13 (4), Taylor & Francis, Ltd., JSTOR 40653043
- Margry, Pierre (1863), Origines transatlantiques: Belain d'Esnambuc et les Normands aux Antilles, d'après des documents nouvellement retrouvés (in French), A. Faure
- Margry, Pierre (1878), "Origines Francaises des Pays d'Outre-Mer", Revue maritime et coloniale (in French), Le Ministère
- Marley, David F. (2008), Wars of the Americas: A Chronology of Armed Conflict in the Western Hemisphere, 1492 to the Present, ABC-CLIO, ISBN 978-1-59884-100-8
- Roget, Jacques Petitjean (2000), Documents (in French), Desormeaux Books, ISBN 978-2-85275-031-9
- Roget, Jacques Petitjean, ed. (1975), Histoire de l’isle de Grenade en Amérique 1649-1659. (1659) (in French), Montréal: Les Presses de l’Université de Montréal
- Roget, Jacques Petitjean (2000b), "RECENSEMENT 1664 Rolle general de la Compagnie de Monsieur DE LAUBIERE ...", Personnes et familles a la Martinique au XVIIe siecle (in French), vol. 1 Documents, Desormeaux Books, ISBN 978-2-85275-031-9
- Rossignol, Bernadette; Rossignol, Philippe (April–May 2003), "Famille ROOLS de GOURSOLAS huit générations en Martinique, qui se terminent en 1902", Généalogie et Histoire de la Caraïbe (158–159)
