= Robert de Clodoré =

French governor of Martinique

Robert le Frichot des Friches, sieur de Clodoré

Governor of Martinique
- In office 20 January 1665 – December 1667
- Preceded by: Jean Dyel de Clermont
- Succeeded by: François Rolle de Laubière (acting); Antoine André de Sainte-Marthe

Personal details
- Occupation: Colonial administrator

Robert le Frichot des Friches, sieur de Clodoré was a French governor of Martinique from 1665 to 1667. He was an energetic and effective leader during the Second Anglo-Dutch War, in which France was an ally of the Dutch from the start of 1666. He used Caribs as auxiliaries, and helped take several islands in the Antilles from the English.

== Early years ==
Robert le Frichot des Friches, sieur de Clodoré, served for many years in the king's armed forces. He became a captain in the marine regiment, then major of Calais and governor of Cardonne (Cardona?) in Catalonia. At the time of his appointment as governor of Martinique he had spent 25 or 26 years in the service and more than 18 as captain, then major and governor.

== Peacetime governor of Martinique (1665–66) ==
Clodoré was named governor of Martinique on 11 October 1664. He was appointed by the newly formed French West India Company (Compagnie des Indes Occidentales). He left La Rochelle on 14 December 1664 with a fleet of four vessels: the 24-gun flagship Harmonie, the Saint-Sébastien, Mercier and the 16-gun frigate Suzanne. The fleet also carried two commissioners-general of the company, a lieutenant of the king and the company's general agent de Chambré. It stopped at the Portuguese islands of Cape Verde, where de Chambré landed to greet the governor. The Mercier separated from the fleet and was the first to arrive in Martinique. When he heard of its arrival the governor general Tracy at once left Guadeloupe and came to Martinique to confer with his officers. (Note: Lieutenant General Alexandre Prouville de Tracy had left France early in 1664 on a fleet of two of the king's warships and four merchant vessels of the Compagnie de Guiane, which had been formed the year before. Tracy commanded about 200 soldiers. His second in command was Joseph-Antoine Le Febvre de La Barre, who was in charge of a group of colonists who were to recreate the French colony of Cayenne. The fleet arrived at Cayenne in May, where the small group of Dutch and Portuguese Jewish planters who had settled in Cayenne capitulated to the French. Tracy left La Barre and the French settlers there and sailed for Martinique taking some of the Dutch settlers and their slaves with him.)

Clodoré arrived on 20 January 1665. He was accompanied by his wife, their servants and several Jesuit priests. He succeeded Jean Dyel du Parquet, sieur de Clermont. On 19 February 1665 Clodoré and Chambré, in the presence of Tracy, formally took possession of Martinique in the name of the West Indies Company. The next day Tracy and Chambré left for Guadeloupe, where they performed the same ceremony. Clodoré had to deal with discontent or even revolt by the settlers, who demanded lower taxes and customs duties, lower prices for imports and lower transport fees. They also protested against the exclusive principle under which that they could trade only with France.

The nearby island of Dominica, still under the control of the original Carib inhabitants, was disputed between the French and the English. A document from late 1665 or early 1666 was signed by the English governor Francis Willoughby, Robert de Clodoré and included the statement, "That the [1660] treaty ... concerning the Caribs will continue in force in Dominica so as not to take it over without the other's consent." (Note: After arriving in 1664 Tracy had ensured that the capesterre Caribs of Dominica formally accepted French protection. He also promoted the idea of placing a French garrison on Dominica.) The subsequent war had the effect of making most Caribs side with the French. The French missionaries, traders and administrators had generally avoided mistreating them, and the French militia had earned their respect, while Willoughby's aggressive action against the Caribs in Saint Lucia had turned them against the English.

== Second Anglo-Dutch War (1666–67) ==
Islands in the Lesser Antilles

=== Early operations ===
On 26 January 1666 Louis XIV of France declared war on England as an ally of the Dutch in the Second Anglo-Dutch War. Word of the start of hostilities reached Clodoré in Martinique on 19 March 1666. He started to improve the island's defenses, and recruited a company of black rebels as extra militiamen. The French administrators of the Antilles islands were told to act defensively, while Willoughby got ready to attack. The French proved much better prepared for war, and with the energetic leadership of Clodoré and others such as Charles de Sales of St. Christophe they achieved a string of victories. Willoughby left Barbados on 18 June 1666 intending to join forces with his brother William, governor of Barbados. His fleet was caught in a hurricane and Willoughby was lost. In August 1666 French planters from Grenada captured Tobago.

Willoughby attempted to use a group of Caribs led by a man named Warner to cause trouble to the French on Dominica, but Warner was captured in 1666. Clodoré wrote, "I have strongly caressed our Caribs, who are very affectionate toward us ... I hope to use this sympathy to construct a fort at Dominica with their consent." After Warner's capture a group of Carib warriors from Saint Vincent and Dominica offered to join the French in attack on the English Leeward Islands, and were received with hospitality in Martinique by Clodoré, who believed in their value as allies in the war. At Guadeloupe the warriors were upset when the French did not attack an English ship that arrived to discuss an exchange of prisoners. Their anger mounted after their raid on Antigua failed when they were spotted before making landfall, but Clodoré managed to calm them down with the aid of many presents and much alcohol.

=== Capture of Antigua ===
The new lieutenant-general Antoine Lefèbvre de La Barre arrived in the Antilles later in 1666 with a fleet and 400 soldiers. He had been given command of naval operations, but on land the governors were in command of their militias and the army had a separate commander. A council of war was held on Martinique in late 1666 in which Clodoré strongly advocated an attack on Antigua. This was agreed upon, and a fleet of seven warships with 166 cannon under the command of La Barre left Martinique on 25 October 1666. The force's leaders included Clodoré and Claude François du Lyon^{(fr)} governor of Guadeloupe. The two governors were on bad terms, and du Lyon strongly disagreed with Clodore's policy of using Caribs and black slaves as auxiliaries. The fleet stopped at Guadeloupe to obtain reinforcements and sailed for Antigua on 2 November 1666.

La Barre's fleet arrived in Antigua on 4 November 1666. Clodoré and du Lyon led the main French advance on 6 November 1666. They were checked by a force of 400 English near the house of the governor, Colonel Robert Carden, who had been captured earlier. They fought their way through, suffering 50–60 casualties, in the last action of the campaign. Clodoré accepted the English capitulation on 10 November 1666 on the frigate Armes d'Angleterre in St. John's harbour.

On 12 November the English deputies sent word that 300 soldiers had arrived from Barbados, and they could no longer fulfill their part of the treaty. The French did not take immediate action, but left for St. Kitts, which they reached on 15 November. After the French left the English militia leader Samuel Winthrop rejected the capitulation treaty because of subsequent outrages by the Caribs. The new English governor Daniel Fitche also refused to honour the capitulation.

Clodoré sailed from St. Kitts to Martinique, then returned to Antigua with a fleet of six frigates, arriving on 30 November. (Note: Another source says Clodoré remained on St. Kitts while La Barre sailed to Martinique, and Clodoré then sailed to Antigua with 11 French ships and almost 1,000 men. After accepting the second English surrender, Clodoré left for Martinique.) Clodoré landed his troops and marched to meet the English. Fitche did not fight but escaped from the island. The French accepted a second capitulation and held the island until it was returned the next year under the Treaty of Breda. Montserrat surrendered to La Barre early in 1667, leaving only Nevis in English possession.

=== Battle of Nevis ===
The Dutch commander Abraham Crijnssen took over Tobago in April 1667 and was sailing for Martinique when he heard that an English squadron commanded by Sir John Berry had entered the Caribbean. In Martinique he and La Barre agreed on joint action against the English, which became more urgent when word arrived that St. Christophe (St. Kitts) was being blockaded by Berry. La Barre and Clodoré combined their forces with Crijnssen. The fleet left Martinique on 14 May 1667 with La Barre on the 38-gun Lis Couronnée, Clodoré on the 32-gun Justice and du Lyon on the 32-gun Concorde, another nine French warships and two fire ships. It carried 600 volunteers from Martinique, and collected 500 more volunteers on Guadeloupe before leaving for Nevis on 18 May 1667.

On 20 May 1667 the Franco-Dutch force was sighted when rounding the south of Nevis and was attacked in the Battle of Nevis by 17 English ships under Berry that sailed from Charlestown harbour. The French line broke up in confusion, and after a long-range exchange of fire with the English La Barre's ship sailed off towards St. Kitts, forcing the Dutch to follow. Crijnssen left for Virginia in disgust. Both Clodoré and Crijnssen accused La Barre of cowardice for leaving the action.

=== Battle of Martinique ===
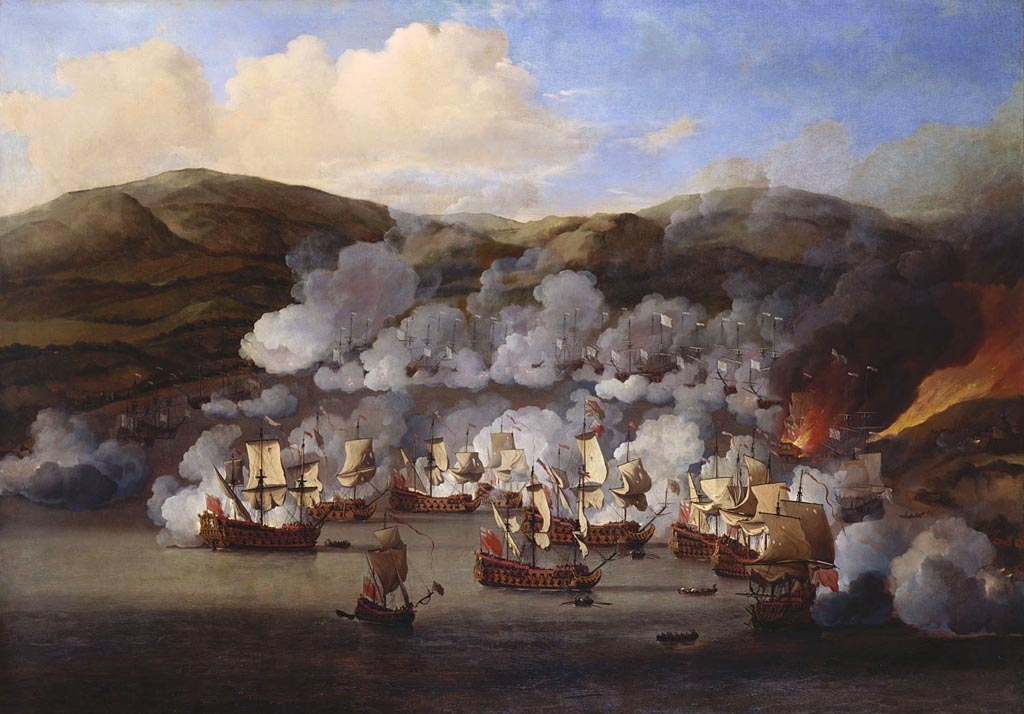
English attack in the Battle of Martinique by Willem van de Velde the Younger (1675)

It was not until Sir John Harman arrived in 1667 with a powerful squadron that the English were able to recover their lost islands. After returning to Martinique, La Barre and Clodoré were arguing about the fiasco at Nevis when Harman's fleet arrived. In the Battle of Martinique The English attacked a fleet of French trading vessels anchored below the protective guns of the Saint-Pierre fortifications on 29 June 1667, and attacked repeatedly over the days that followed. On 6 July 1667 English fireships burned several French warships, and the next day Harman bombarded the Saint Pierre fortifications. Clodoré put up a fight from the Saint Sébastien, but by the end of the day 23 French ships had been lost.

== Later career ==
The Treaty of Breda was signed in July 1667, and Clodoré left the island in December of that year. Clodoré sent a factum to Jean-Baptiste Colbert that described the problems he dealt with at the end of his term of office. Of an incident involving Le Febvre de La Barre he wrote, "two days before my departure he encountered one of my slaves, who was keeping my horse beside the door of the Assembly ... he set about striking him." Clodoré went on to complain that Le Febvre de La Barre had publicly accused him of "insolence". From a marginal note that summarizes the incidents it seems that the public insult was much the more important offense. Clodoré was ennobled in 1668. He was succeeded in Martinique by François Rolle de Laubière as interim governor, then in December 1672 by Antoine André de Sainte-Marthe de Lalande, chevalier de Sainte-Marthe.

Clodoré may have been the author of a set of memoirs by "I.C.S.D.V." published in Paris by Gervais Clouzier in 1671, Relation de ce qui s'est passé, dans les Isles & Terre-Ferme de l'Amérique, pendant la dernière Guerre avec l'Angleterre, & depuis en execution du Traitté de Breda, Avec un Journal Du dernier Voyage du Sr de la Barre en la Terre-Ferme, & Isle de Cayenne, accompagné d'une exacte description du Pays, moeurs & naturel des Habitans. Le tout recueilly des Memoires des principaux Officiers qui ont commandé en ces Pays.

== Sources ==
- Antigua and the Antiguans: A Full Account of the Colony and Its Inhabitants, Saunders and Otley, 1844, ISBN 978-1-108-02776-2
- Banbuck, C.A. (1935), Histoire politique, économique et sociale de la Martinique sous l'Ancien Régime (in French), Paris: Marcel Revière
- Boucher, Philip P. (2009-04-27), Cannibal Encounters: Europeans and Island Caribs, 1492–1763, JHU Press, ISBN 978-0-8018-9099-4
- Boucher, Philip P. (2010-12-29), France and the American Tropics to 1700: Tropics of Discontent?, JHU Press, ISBN 978-1-4214-0202-4
- Cahoon, Ben, "Martinique", Worldstatesmen.org
- Clément, Pierre; Brotonne, Pierre de (1865), Lettres, instructions et mémoires de Colbert (publiés d'après les ordres de l'empereur, sur la proposition de Son Excellence M. Magne, ministre secrétaire d'état des finances) (in French), Imprimerie impériale
- Goslinga, Cornelis C. (2012-12-06), A Short History of the Netherlands Antilles and Surinam, Springer Science & Business Media, ISBN 978-94-009-9289-4
- Gourdon de Genouillac, H. (1869), Dictionnaire des anoblissements (Contenant l'indication des anoblissements, maintenues de noblesse, concessions, collations de titres, etc: accordés par les rois de France, avec les dates d'enregistrement, 1270-1790) (in French), libr. Bachelin-Deflorenne
- Harrigan, Michael (2018-06-01), Frontiers of servitude: Slavery in narratives of the early French Atlantic, Manchester University Press, ISBN 978-1-5261-2224-7
- Labat, Jean Baptiste (1742), Nouveau voyage aux isles de l'Amerique ... Nouv. ed. augm (in French), Theodoe le Gras
- Lampin, D., "Robert Le Fichot des Friches, sieur de Clodoré", La Martinique à la carte (in French)
- La Roque, Robert. (2000), "Le Febvre de la Barre, Joseph-Antoine", Dictionary of Canadian Biography, vol. 1
- Marley, David (2008), Wars of the Americas: A Chronology of Armed Conflict in the Western Hemisphere, 1492 to the Present, ABC-CLIO, ISBN 978-1-59884-100-8
- Tertre, P. du (1755), “Les” Piéces justificatives concernant la propriété de l'isle de Sainte-Lucie: 3 (in French), De L'Imprimerie Royale
