= Alphonse Louis Théodore de Mogès =

French naval officer (1789–1850)

Alphonse Louis Théodore, comte de Moges ou Demoges (December 26, 1789 – July 6, 1850) was a 19th-century French naval officer who was involved in Marine affairs of the Caribbean.

== Biography ==
Alphonse de Moges is the son of Léonard de Moges and Françoise de Moges.

In 1809, he was part of the naval expedition to the Scheldt and took part in the battles of Berg-op-Zoom , Willemstadt and Helvoët-Sluys.

In 1823, he was sent on a mission to South America and then in 1830 became commander of a frigate in the Algiers expedition.

In 1838, he was appointed Governor of Martinique until 1840, then commander-in-chief of the Antilles station (1840–1844).

He then became maritime prefect of Cherbourg (1844–1846).

In 1845 he was promoted to vice-admiral.

De Moges is also known for his research on the development of steam applied to navigation and for having contributed to generalizing the application of the permanent levee system.

== Writings ==
- Considerations on the French Navy, 1818
- Essay on the maritime system of France, 1821

== Marriage and descendants ==
Alphonse de Moges married Blanche des Acres de L'Aigle (Paris, February 9, 1807 - Château de Brou, Noyant de Touraine, January 13, 1899) in Paris on July 14, 1829. She was the daughter of Count Victor des Acres de L'Aigle, field marshal, general councilor and deputy of Oise, and Princess Constance de Broglie. They both had two children: Alfred de Moges, Marquis de Moges, diplomat, unmarried (Paris, October 4, 1830 - Menton, January 15, 1861); Paul de Moges, Marquis de Moges after his brother (Paris, January 31, 1832 - Château de Brou, Noyant de Touraine, February 11, 1903), married in 1864 to Alix de Menou (1842-1900), without children. Both bought in 1865 and had the Château de Brou restored from 1866 to 1868, which passed after them to a niece of the Marquis, Ida des Acres de L'Aigle.
