= Jean-Charles de Baas =

Jean-Charles de Baas-Castelmore, marquis de Baas

Lieutenant general of the French Antilles
- In office 4 February 1669 – 15 January 1677
- Preceded by: Antoine Lefèbvre de La Barre
- Succeeded by: Gabriel de Jolinet (interim); Charles de Courbon de Blénac

Personal details
- Died: 15 January 1677

Jean-Charles de Baas-Castelmore, marquis de Baas (died 15 January 1677) was governor and lieutenant general of the French Antilles from 1669 to 1677. As a young man he became a soldier during the Franco-Spanish War (1635–59), and participated in the Fronde rebellion of 1648–53. King Louis XIV pardoned him for this, and he played an important role in the fighting in Italy. After being made governor general of the Antilles he transferred the administrative center from Saint Christopher Island (Saint Kitts) to the more strategically located and economically important Martinique. He had to deal with constant crises in supplies caused by the (often-ignored) ban on trading with the English and Dutch. He improved the administration, developed the defenses of Fort Royal, and helped fight off an attempted Dutch invasion in 1674.

== Family ==
Jean-Charles de Baas was born some time after 1612. His family came from Béarn in southwest France, but may have originated in the Netherlands. His grandfather was Pierre de Baas, jurat of the town of Nay in Béarn (now Pyrénées-Atlantiques), around 1567–68. His father Jean de Bas of Nay, co-seigneur of the "secular" abbey of Igon, married Judith de Laugar of Pau, from a family of councilors in the Navarre parlement, around 1610–12. Jean-Charles's older brother, Isaac de Baas, was a soldier who became sub-lieutenant of the King's musketeers. He resigned in 1658 in favour of d'Artagnan, prototype of a character in the historical romance The Three Musketeers by Alexandre Dumas.

== Military career ==
Jean-Charles de Baas was captain in the Regiment de Persan under his brother Isaac de Baas, who was major of the regiment. He joined in the Fronde rebellion (1648–53) and participated with his brother in abduction plots of César, Duke of Vendôme and Cardinal Mazarin. In September 1652 he helped defend the Château de Montrond in Cher when it was besieged by royal troops under the Philippe de Clérambault^{(fr)}, maréchal de Palluau. In Landes he participated under Colonel Balthazar in resistance to the followers of Mazarin. He became a captain of the guards of the Princess of Condé. He participated in the peace negotiations in Bègles.

De Baas was amnestied after the Fronde and maintained his rank as maréchal des camps et armées du roi. During the Franco-Spanish War (1635–1659) he took part in the Siege of Arras in 1654, then joined the Army of Italy. He was at the Siege of Pavia in 1655. On 8 November 1656 he was promoted to lieutenant general of the king's armies. He played a distinguished role in the war in Italy under the Duke of Modena, and then the Duke of Navailles^{(fr)}, until the war ended with the Treaty of the Pyrenees in November 1659. He was then made commander in chief of the French troops in Italy.

== Lieutenant-general of the Antilles ==
Islands in the Lesser Antilles

=== Appointment ===
On 1 February 1667 de Baas was appointed the king's lieutenant-general American Islands and mainland (lieutenant général des Îles d'Amérique et de la Terre Ferme), to take effect after the recall of his predecessor Antoine Lefèbvre de La Barre on 19 September 1668. He received the king's instructions for government of the Antilles by a letter of 16 September 1668 signed by the king's minister Jean-Baptiste Colbert . The appointment was made despite the fact that he was Protestant. De Baas arrived in Martinique with the squadron of Admiral Jean II d'Estrées, and registered his commission with the Sovereign Council of the island on 4 February 1669.

=== Policies ===
The instructions given to de Baas by Colbert were to favour the interests of the French West India Company, to eliminate foreign trade from the islands, particularly Dutch trade, to populate the islands and develop agriculture and trade, to place the islands in a permanent state of defense, to conquer foreign islands and strongholds, and to enforce the laws and ordinances of the kingdom, always with tact and gentleness. In the lead-up to the Franco-Dutch War of 1672–77 Colbert told de Baas it would greatly please Louis XIV if he could hamper the trade of the Dutch and drive them from their islands "if this were possible without encroaching directly on the treaties His Majesty has with them."

During his administration de Baas did much to improve the efficiency of the colony's administration, including taxation. He developed the first version of a capitation tax based on the number of residents of a home, slaves included. He continued the ban on lawyers in the islands, which lasted until 1710. He also banned militia officers from dispensing justice, although this continued in practice.

De Baas had a low opinion of the Island Caribs and said they were "a people without faith and religion, who are more beasts than men..." He doubted that missionaries could achieve anything with such people. In early 1670 de Bass wrote that the Caribs wanted to fight the Dutch on Tobago. Colbert replied on 3 July 1670 that it would be useful to covertly assist the Caribs to prey upon Dutch commerce. In 1674 de Baas asked for 200 soldiers to either annihilate the Caribs on Dominica or make them galley slaves. Colbert refused, saying de Baas must seek a reconciliation with them. He was told that he should overawe the Caribs with French military power. De Baas came to agree that the Caribs had to be impressed by gifts and "good treatments".

=== Saint Christopher and Martinique ===
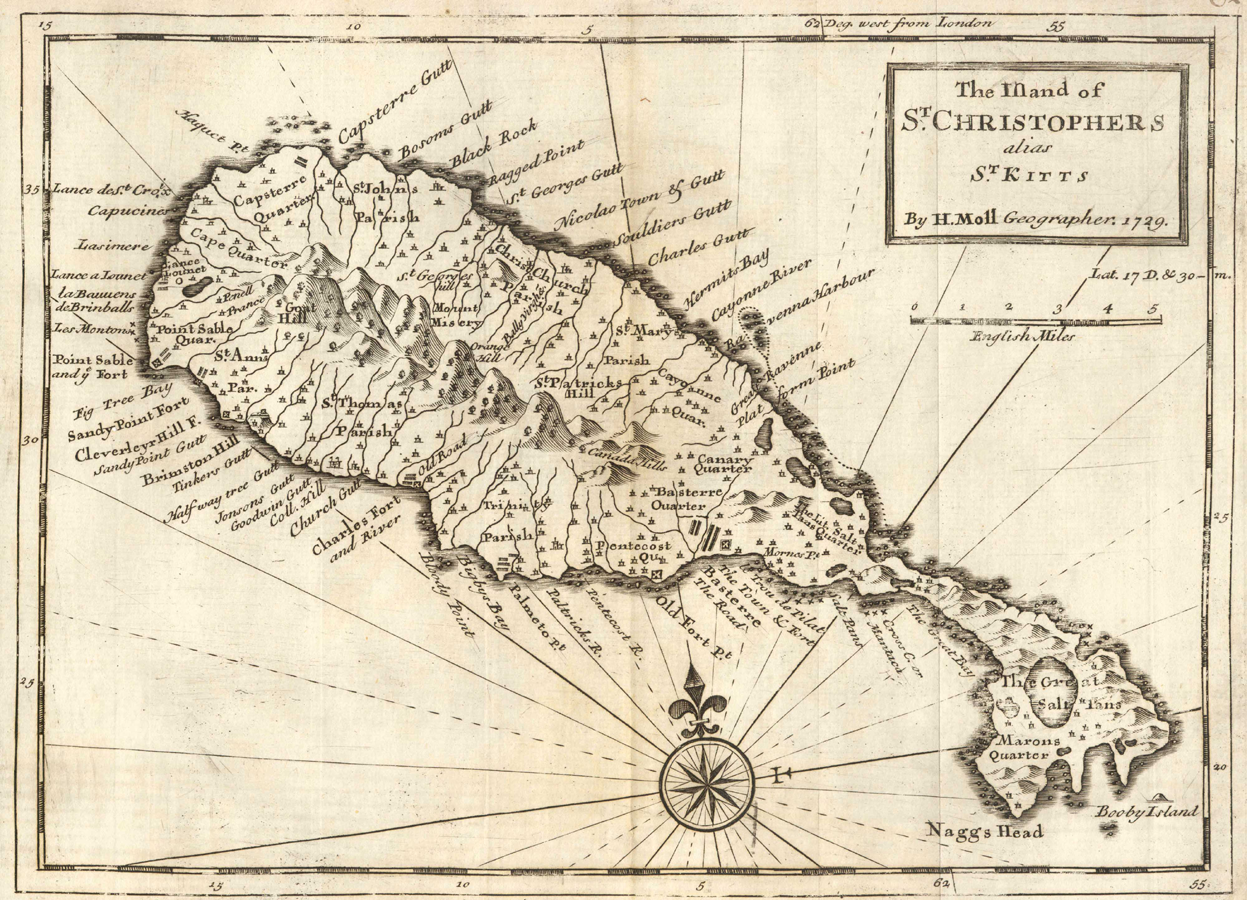
St Christophers. Fort Charles (English) is on the south coast of the west part. Basseterre (French), also on the south coast, is further east.

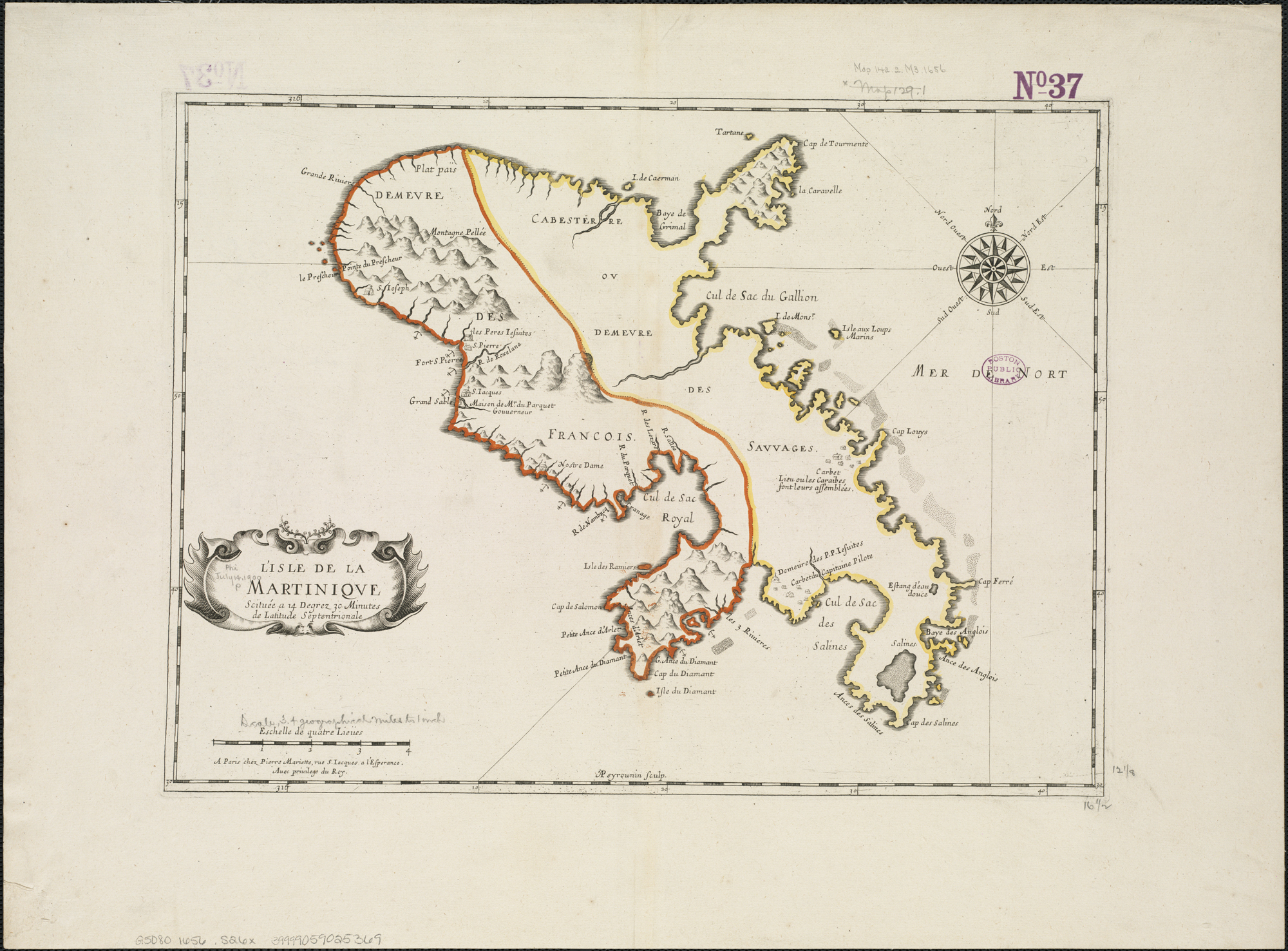
1656 map of Martinique, still divided between the French (west) and Caribs (east)

De Baas decided that Saint Christopher Island was less important, and certainly less strategic, than Martinique, and moved the seat of the lieutenant general to Saint-Pierre, Martinique. Saint Christopher still had the largest French population in the Antilles, but the island was divided between the French and the English, which made expansion of the colony difficult. The French had both ends of the island, but the English had more land suitable for agriculture. After de Baas moved his headquarters to Martinique in 1669 the population and the level of sugar production on Saint Christopher slowly declined between 1671 and 1689.

Since de Baas had little money, in 1674 the king gave him a house in Saint Pierre named Funds-Capot that had been confiscated from a Zeelander named Wassen. In February 1674 de Baas wrote to Colbert of the colonists living on Martinique, "...one need not worry about them dying of starvation in the absence of French merchant vessels, Monseigneur; in every month of the year, the habitants have local foodstuffs available to them – peas of different kinds, manioc, yams, potatoes, as well as many delicious fruits. There is good water with which they make refreshing drinks;..." In 1676 he began to develop the colonial settlement at the strategically important site of Fort Royal.

For three years François Rolle de Laubière was local governor of Martinique under de Baas. Laubière died in Fort-Royal, Martinique in February 1672. Antoine André de Sainte-Marthe was then appointed local governor of Martinique. He arrived in Saint Pierre on 28 December 1672. De Baas was not at first enthusiastic about the idea of a governor who was a complete stranger to the colony. However, in a letter to Colbert of 1 June 1673 he wrote that Sainte-Marthe had done his duty well, and was active and intelligent.

=== Recurrent food crises ===
In 1669 de Baas responded to an order to block trade with foreigners in goods and slaves by saying that it would not be practical to do so, although he would order the policy registered in Martinique. He asked that even the nominal ban be lifted in the case of African slaves, since they were essential to economic development. A royal ordinance of 10 June 1670 banned all trading between the French colonies in the Americas and foreign countries. That year de Baas reported that owing to lack of supplies from France the colonists of Guadeloupe and Martinique often traded in Barbados.

In another food crisis in 1672 de Baas wrote that if "slaves lacked [imported] beef, then planters would lack slaves, because those slaves with the strength would flee plantations or desert, and those without, such as women and children, would weaken further and die". He went on to say of the wooden fort being built at Cul de Sac Royal (later Fort Royal) that "the slaves who serve the workers, having only manioc flour, are deserting, and the workers who have no meat cannot or will not continue to work. I have suspended the work until French merchants bring meat to our islands."

In his June 1673 letter to Colbert de Baas complained about the excessive prices of food sent from France. This inclined the people towards the Dutch, who had always treated them well. Work on Fort Royal was suspended again in 1674 for lack of food. In 1675 de Baas allowed an exemption to the ban on foreign trade in Martinique. He reported to France that due to shortage of food he had been forced to let four English vessels deliver supplies, and a few African slaves. In 1676 he reported that he had confiscated an English vessel trading in Martinique, but did not say what cargo it was carrying.

=== Franco-Dutch War (1672–77) ===
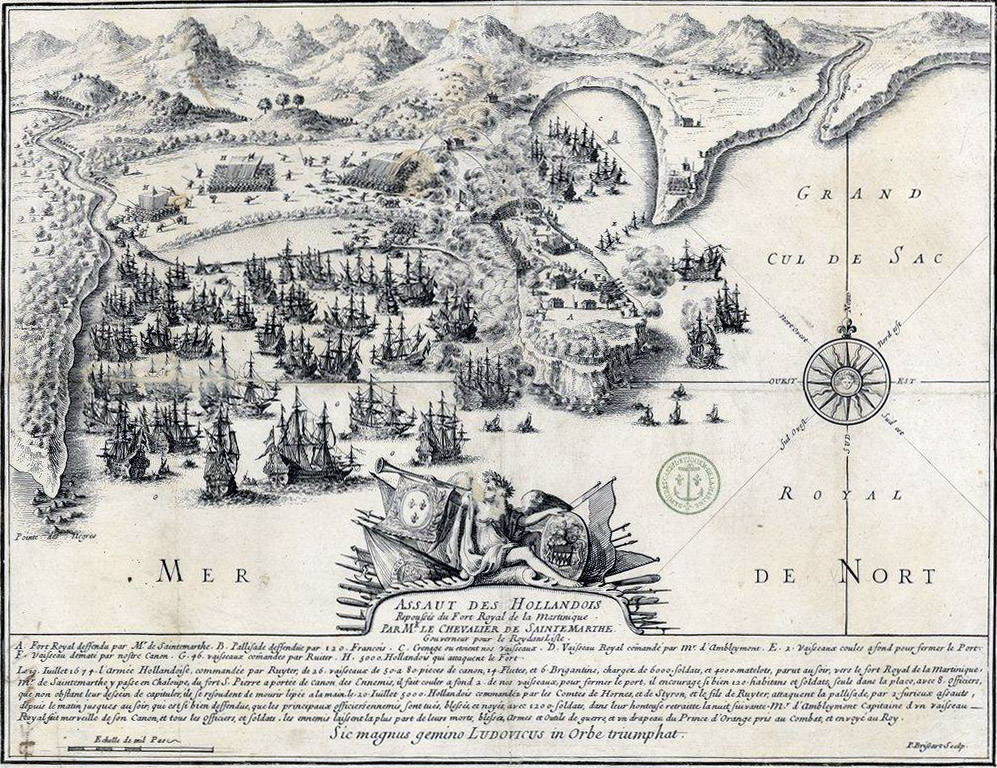
Dutch attack on Fort Royal (1674)

In the second half of 1672 de Baas learned of the outbreak of the Franco-Dutch War, and began to organize an expedition against the Dutch base on Curaçao. He led the expedition against Curaçao early in 1673. The assault failed and on 18 March 1673 he ordered a retreat. De Baas and Sainte-Marthe successfully repulsed the Dutch fleet of Admiral Michiel de Ruyter during the attempted Invasion of Martinique (1674). The king ennobled Sainte-Marthe for his victory against the Dutch. De Baas continued as governor and lieutenant general after the French West India Company was dissolved in 1674.

On 17 December 1676 d'Estrées appeared before Cayenne, and the next day defeated the Dutch defenders. He then sailed north to Martinique, where de Baas raised several hundred men as reinforcements and gave information about the Dutch in Tobago. D'Estrées continued to Tobago, where he made an unsuccessful attack in the First Battle of Tobago in February–March 1677.

De Baas was sick with dysentery for a long time. He died on 15 January 1677. Due to his religion he could not be buried in the cemetery but was buried on 16 January 1677 at his home, Fonds Capot, in what is now Bellefontaine. During his retreat to Grenada D'Estrées heard of the death of de Baas. Charles de Courbon de Blénac was temporarily appointed his successor and returned to France with d'Estrées to have the appointment confirmed.

== Sources ==
- Boucher, Philip P. (2010-12-29), France and the American Tropics to 1700: Tropics of Discontent?, JHU Press, ISBN 978-1-4214-0202-4
- Germain, Jean-Christophe (September 2003), "de BAAS et de BATZ-CASTELMORE", Généalogie et Histoire de la Caraïbe (162)
- Goslinga, Cornelis C. (2012-12-06), A Short History of the Netherlands Antilles and Surinam, Springer Science & Business Media, ISBN 978-94-009-9289-4
- Guët, Isidore (1893), Origines de la Martinique. Le colonel François de Collart et la Martinique de son temps; colonisation, sièges, révoltes et combats de 1625 à1720, Vannes: Lafolye
- Henneton, Lauric; Roper, Louis (2016-04-21), Fear and the Shaping of Early American Societies, BRILL, ISBN 978-90-04-31474-0
- Lampin, Didier, "Jean-Charles de Baas (inc, 1677)", La Martinique à la carte... (in French)
- Lampin (c), Didier, "Gouverneurs Generaux des Îles et Gouverneurs Particuliers de la Martinique", La Martinique à la carte..., archived from the original on 2018-09-11
- Mandelblatt, Bertie (1 March 2007), "A Transatlantic Commodity: Irish Salt Beef in the French Atlantic World", History Workshop Journal, 63 (1): 18–47, doi:10.1093/hwj/dbm028
- Marley, David (2010), Pirates of the Americas, ABC-CLIO, ISBN 978-1-59884-201-2
- Mathout, Gérard, "François Rolle", Geneanet (in French)
- O'Malley, Gregory E. (2014), Final Passages: The Intercolonial Slave Trade of British America, 1619–1807, UNC Press Books, ISBN 978-1-4696-1534-9
- Petrovich, Alisa V. (Winter 1998), "Perception and Reality: Colbert's Native American Policy", Louisiana History: The Journal of the Louisiana Historical Association, 39 (1): 73–83, JSTOR 4233472
- Pritchard, Pritchard, James S. (2004-01-22), In Search of Empire: The French in the Americas, 1670-1730, Cambridge University Press, ISBN 978-0-521-82742-3
- Roux, Sophie de, "Antoine André de SAINTE-MARTHE", Geneanet (in French)
- Sutour, Jean-Michel, Bellefontaine (in French)
