= List of colonial and departmental heads of Martinique =

(Dates in italics indicate de facto continuation of office)

== Ancient regime and First Republic (1635-1794) ==
Term	Incumbent	Notes
French Suzerainty
French colony (under the Compagnie des Îles de l'Amérique)
1635	Pierre Belain d'Esnambuc, Governor	
1635 to 1636	Jean Dupont, Governor	
1636 to 1646	Jacques Dyel du Parquet, Governor	1st time
February 1646 to January 1647	Jérôme du Sarrat, sieur de La Pierrière, interim Governor	
1647 to 1650	Jacques Dyel du Parquet, Governor	2nd time
Granted to the Dyel du Parquet family
1650 to 1658	Jacques Dyel du Parquet, Governor	2nd time
1658 to 1659	Marie Bonnard du Parquet, Governor	?
1659 to October 1662	Adrien Dyel de Vaudroques, Governor	
1662 to 1663	Médéric Rolle de Goursolas, Governor	
1663 to 1664	Jean Dyel de Clermont, Governor	
Under the Compagnie des Indes Occidentales
1664 to 1665	Jean Dyel de Clermont, Governor	
February 1665 to December 1667	Robert de Clodoré, Governor	
1667 to 1672	François Rolle de Laubière, acting Governor	
December 1672 to 1674	Antoine André de Sainte-Marthe, Governor	
French crown colony
1674 to December 1679	Antoine André de Sainte-Marthe, Governor	
1680 to 1687	Jacques de Chambly, Governor	
1687 to 1689	Charles de Pechpeyrou-Comminges de Guitaut, Governor	
February 1689 to 31 March 1689	Claude de Roux de Saint-Laurent, interim Governor	
1689 to June 1711	Nicolas de Gabaret, Governor	
1711 to 1716	Jean-Pierre de Charitte, Governor	Did not take up post
1716	Abraham de Bellebat, marquis du Quesne, Governor	
7 January 1717 to 23 May 1717	Antoine d'Arcy, sieur de La Varenne, Governor	
1717(?) to 1720	Florimond Hurault de Montigny, Governor	Supposedly hanged by pirate Bartholomew Roberts
1720 to 1727	Jacques Charles de Bochard de Noray de Champigny, Governor	
1728 to March 1742	Jean François Louis de Brach, Governor	
1742 to 1744	André Martin, sieur de Pointesable, Governor	
1744 to 12 May 1750	Charles de Tubières de Caylus, Governor	
1750 to 1752	Maximin de Bompart, Governor	Acting to 1752
1752 to 1757	Alexandre Rouillé de Rocourt, Governor	
May 1757 to 7 February 1761	François V de Beauharnais, Governor	
February 1761 to February 1762	Louis-Charles Le Vassor de La Touche, Governor	
British Occupation
February 1762 to July 1763	William Rufane, Governor	
French Suzerainty
July 1763 to April 1764	François Louis de Salignac, Governor	
25 January 1765 to 1768	Victor-Thérèse Charpentier, Governor	
Part of the French Antilles
1768 to 1772	Victor-Thérèse Charpentier, Governor	
9 March 1772 to 15 March 1776	Vital Auguste, marquis de Grégoire, comte de Nozières, Governor	
15 March 1776 to May 1777	Robert d'Argout, Governor	
May 1777 to March 1783	François Claude Amour, marquis de Bouillé, Governor	
Separate colony
March 1783 to March 1791	Claude Charles de Marillac, vicomte de Damas, Governor	
July 1789 to April 1790	Charles du Houx de Vioménil, acting Governor	Acting for Damas
12 March 1791 to September 1792	Jean Pierre Antoine, comte de Béhague, Governor	
January 1793 to 22 May 1794	Donatien-Marie-Joseph de Vimeur, vicomte de Rochambeau, Governor	

== British occupation (1794–1814) ==
Term	Incumbent	Notes
British Occupation
1794	Robert Prescott, Governor	
1794 to 1795	Sir John Vaughan, Governor	
1795 to 1796	Sir Robert Shore Milnes, Governor	
1796 to 1802	Sir William Keppel, Governor	
French Suzerainty
May 1802 to 1804	Charles-Henri Bertin, Colonial Prefect	
1804 to 1809	Pierre-Clément de Laussat, Colonial Prefect	
September 1802 to 21 February 1809	Louis Thomas Villaret de Joyeuse, Captain-General	
British Occupation
21 February 1809 to 1809	Sir George Beckwith, Captain-General	
10 June 1809 to 1812	Major-General John Brodrick, Captain-General	
1812 to 1814	Sir Charles Wale, Captain-General	
1814	Sir John Lindsay, Captain-General	

== Restoration, Second Republic, Second Empire (1814–70) ==
Term	Incumbent	Notes
French Suzerainty
1814 to 10 September 1817	Pierre de Vaugiraud, Captain-General	
10 September 1817 to 1818	Pierre de Vaugiraud, Governor	
1818 to 1826	François Xavier, comte de Donzelot, Governor	
1826 to 1829	François Marie Michel de Bouillé, Governor	
1829 to 1830	Louis Henri de Saulces de Freycinet, Governor	
1830 to 1834	Jean Henri Joseph Dupôtet, Governor	
1834 to 1836	Emmanuel Halgan, Governor	
1836 to January 1838	Ange René Armand, baron de Mackau, Governor	
January 1838 to July 1838	Claude Rostoland, acting Governor	1st time
1838 to 1840	Alphonse Louis Théodore de Mogès, Governor	
1840 to 1844	Étienne Henri Mengin Duval d'Ailly, Governor	
1844 to March 1848	Pierre Louis Aimé Mathieu, Governor	
March 1848 to 3 June 1848	Claude Rostoland, acting Governor	2nd time
3 June 1848 to November 1848	François Auguste Perrinon, Governor	
1848 to 1851	Armand Joseph Bruat, Governor	
11 April 1851 to 1853	Auguste-Nicolas Vaillant, Governor	
1853	Jacques Brunot, acting Governor	
15 June 1853 to September 1856	Louis Henri de Gueydon, Governor	
1856	Louis André Lagrange, acting Governor	1st time
August 1856 to 1859	Armand Louis Joseph Denis, comte Fitte de Soucy, Governor	
1859	Louis André Lagrange, acting Governor	2nd time
1859 to 1864	Antoine Marie Ferdinand de Maussion de Candé, Governor	
1864 to 1867	François Théodore de Lapelin, Governor	
1867	André César Vérand, acting Governor	
1867 to 1869	Charles Bertier, Governor	
1869 to 1870	Marie Gabriel Couturier, acting Governor	

== Third Republic (1870–1940) ==
Term	Incumbent	Notes
1870 to 1871	Charles Louis Constant Menche de Loisne, Governor	
1871	Octave Bernard Gilbert-Pierre, acting Governor	
1871 to 1874	Georges Charles Cloué, Governor	
1874	François Charles Michaux, acting Governor	
1875 to 1877	Thomas Louis Kirkland Le Normant de Kergrist, Governor	
1877 to 1879	Marie Bruno Ferdinand Grasset, Governor	
1879	Charles Alexandre Lacouture, acting Governor	
1879 to 1881	Hyacinthe Laurent Théophile Aube, Governor	
1881	J. C. Morau, acting Governor	
1881 to 1887	Vincent Gaëtan Allègre, Governor	
1887	Coridon, acting Governor	
1887 to 1889	Louis Albert Grodet, Governor	
20 October 1889 – 1 September 1890	Germain Casse, Governor	
4 February 1891 to June 1895	Delphino Moracchini, Governor	
1895 to 1898	Noël Pardon, Governor	
1898 to 1901	Marie Louis Gustave Gabrié, Governor	
16 July 1901 to 8 May 1902	Louis Mouttet, Governor	
May 1902 to 1902	Georges Lhuerre, acting Governor	
1902 to 1904	Jean Baptiste Philémon Lemaire, Governor	
1904 to 1906	Louis Alphonse Bonhoure, Governor	
10 March 1906 to 1908	Charles Louis Lepreux, Governor	
1908 to 1913	Fernand Foureau, Governor	
1913 to 1914	Joseph Henri Alfred Vacher, Governor	
1914 to 1915	Georges Virgile Poulet, Governor	
1915 to 1920	Camille Lucien Xavier Guy, Governor	
1920 to 1921	Jules Maurice Gourbeil, Governor	
1921 to 1922	Fernand Ernest Levecque, Governor	
1922 to 1923	Charles Sergent-Alleaume, interim Governor	
1923 to 1926	Henri Marius Richard, Governor	
1926 to 1928	Robert Paul Marie de Guise, Governor	
14 February 1928 to 15 July 1932	Louis Martial Innocent Gerbinis, Governor	1st time
15 July 1932 to 23 August 1932	Adolphe Félix Sylvestre Éboué, acting Governor	1st time
23 August 1932 to 4 June 1933	Louis Martial Innocent Gerbinis, Governor	2nd time
4 June 1933 to 7 January 1934	Adolphe Félix Sylvestre Éboué, acting Governor	2nd time
7 January 1934 to 1934	Louis Martial Innocent Gerbinis, Governor	3rd time
1934	René Veber, Governor	
1934 to 1935	Matteo Mathieu Maurice Alfassa, Governor	
1935 to 1936	Louis Jacques Eugène Fousset, Governor	
1936	Marie Marc Georges Pelicier, Governor	
22 October 1936 to 7 January 1938	Jean-Baptiste Alberti, Governor	
1938	Léopold Arthur André Allys, acting Governor	
1938 to 1939	Maurice Xavier Joseph Dechartre, Governor	
1939 to 1940	Georges Aimé Spitz, Governor	
1940 to March 1941	Louis Henri François Denis Bressoles, Governor	
March 1941 to July 1943	Yves Maurice Nicol, Governor	
14 July 1943 to 31 July 1944	Louis Georges André Ponton, Governor	Acting to 17 September 1943
1944 to January 1945	Antoine Marie Angelini, Governor	

== Fourth and Fifth Republics (1945-present) ==
Term	Incumbent	Notes
14 January 1945 to 1946	Georges Hubert Parisot, Governor	
French overseas département
1946 to 1947	Georges Louis Joseph Orselli, Governor	
18 July 1947 to 27 July 1950	Pierre Albert Trouillé, Prefect	
25 August 1950 to 1 November 1954	Christian Robert Roger Laigret, Prefect	
1 November 1954 to 16 June 1957	Gaston Claude Villéger, Prefect	
1 August 1957 to 1 January 1960	Jacques Alphonse Boissier, Prefect	
1 January 1960 to 25 April 1961	Jean Parsi, Prefect	
25 April 1961 to 8 November 1963	Michel Grollemund, Prefect	
21 November 1963 to 16 September 1966	Raphaël Roman Hubert Petit, Prefect	
16 September 1966 to 1 August 1967	Pierre Francis Lambertin, Prefect	
7 August 1967 to 20 June 1969	Jean Deliau, Prefect	
1 September 1969 to 15 June 1970	Pierre Béziau, Prefect	
1 July 1970 to 1 July 1973	Jean Benjamin Terrade, Prefect	
1 July 1973 to 15 November 1975	Christian Ernest Orsetti, Prefect	
15 November 1975 to 20 May 1978	Paul Noirot-Cosson, Prefect	
20 May 1978 to 3 May 1979	Raymond Raoul Émile Heim, Prefect	
3 May 1979 to 27 July 1981	Marcel Lucien Paul Julia, Prefect	
27 July 1981 to 10 May 1982	Jean Chevance, Prefect	
10 May 1982 to 6 March 1985	Jean Chevance, Commissioner of the Republic	
6 March 1985 to 4 November 1987	Édouard Lacroix, Commissioner of the Republic	
4 November 1987 to 24 February 1988	Jean Jouandet, Commissioner of the Republic	
24 February 1988 to 12 April 1989	Jean Jouandet, Prefect	
12 April 1989 to 4 September 1991	Jean-Claude Roure, Prefect	
4 September 1991 to 6 January 1995	Michel Morin, Prefect	
6 January 1995 to 24 August 1998	Jean-François Cordet, Prefect	
31 August 1998 to 21 June 2000	Dominique Bellion, Prefect	
24 July 2000 to 28 March 2003	Michel Cadot, Prefect	
French overseas region
28 March 2003 to 9 February 2004	Michel Cadot, Prefect	
9 February 2004 to 20 June 2007	Yves Dassonville, Prefect	
20 June 2007 to 2 August 2007	Patrice Latron, interim Prefect	
2 August 2007 to 28 March 2011	Ange Mancini, Prefect	
5 February 2020 to 29 July 2022	Stanislas Cazelles, Prefect	
since 23 August 2022	Jean-Christophe Bouvier, Prefect	

== See also ==
- Martinique
- Politics of Martinique
