= Jean François Louis de Brach =

French naval officer and governor of Martinique

Governor of Martinique
- In office 1728–1739
- Preceded by: Jacques Charles de Bochard de Noray de Champigny
- Succeeded by: André Martin de Pointesable

Personal details
- Born: 28 May 1668
- Died: 24 September 1739 (aged 71) Rochefort, Charente-Maritime, France
- Occupation: Naval officer

Jean François Louis de Brach (28 May 1668 – 24 September 1739) was a French naval officer who was governor of Martinique from 1728 to 1739.

== Life ==
Jean François Louis de Brach was born on 28 May 1668. His parents were François Louis de Brach, seigneur de la Mothe-Montussan (died 1701) and Marie de Lootins. He joined the navy and was a garde-marine in 1685, enseigne de vaisseau in 1691 and lieutenant de vaisseau in 1692.

In 1717, Brach married Marie Thérèse Boutou de La Baugissière in Rochefort. Their children were Jean (1718–93), François (born 1720), Renée Justine, Marie Anne Louise and Bertille. In 1725, he bought Esnandes from Jean Gâtebois, director of the Compagnie des Indes. His son, also Jean-François-Louis de Brach, (Note: Brach's son Jean-François-Louis was a capitaine de vaisseau and seigneur of Enandes des Moulières. Jean married Catherine Gaigneron in 1758. Their daughter Marie-Eulalie married Benjamin Louis Charles Brochard de La Rochebrochard, a member of the king's guard, on 17 February 1784. Brochard de La Rochebrochard emigrated in 1791 during the French Revolution.) was seigneur d’Esnandes at the time of the French Revolution.

Brach was promoted to capitaine de frégate in 1727 and was appointed governor of Martinique the same year. He replaced Jacques Charles Bochart, sieur de Champigny, and was succeeded by André Martin, Sieur de Pointesable. He was made commander of the Windward Islands in 1728, acting for the governor general. Brach died on 24 September 1739 in Rochefort, Charente-Maritime.

== Sources ==
- "Brach, Jean François Louis de", iREL: Instruments de Recharche en Ligne (in French), Archives nationales (France)
- Lafon, Françoise (1992), Esnandes village d'Aunis, La Rochelle: Société d’Archéologie et d’Histoire de l’Aunis
- Pierfit, "François Louis de BRACH", Geneanet (in French)
- Saint Allais, Nicolas Viton de (1815), Nobiliare universel de France, ou recueil général des généalogies historiques des maisons nobles de ce royaume (in French)
