= Marie Bonnard du Parquet =

Governor of Martinique
- In office 1658–1658
- Preceded by: Jacques Dyel du Parquet
- Succeeded by: Adrien Dyel de Vaudroques

Personal details
- Born: Marie Bonnard Paris
- Died: 1659 Atlantic crossing
- Occupation: Pioneer

Marie Bonnard du Parquet (died 1659) was the wife of Jacques Dyel du Parquet, one of the first governors of Martinique, who purchased the island in 1650. When her husband died she tried to act as governor in the name of her children, but was forced out of power. She fell ill and died while returning to France.

== Marriage ==
Marie Bonnard was the daughter of Jean Bonnard, Bourgeois of Paris, and Françoise de Jarre. She married Chesneau de Saint-André, commis général of Martinique, but this marriage was annulled by a Jesuit of the island. On 21 November 1645 the Jesuit Charles Hempteau married Jacques Dyel du Parquet, Governor of Martinique, to Marie Bonnard of Paris. Witnesses were Lefort, La Pierrière and Bonnard. She apparently married du Parquet secretly. During the Thoisy affair of 1646-47, when du Parquet was imprisoned by Phillippe de Longvilliers de Poincy, Lieutenant-General of the French Islands, Marie led a group in Martinique that demanded the exchange of Poincy's captured nephews (Robert de Longvilliers and Charles de Tréval) for her husband.

After his release and return to Martinique, du Parquet publicly acknowledged the marriage. The Jesuit Jean Tehenel blessed the wedding on 30 April 1647 in Saint-Jacques chapel, Martinique, in the presence of several witnesses. Under a purchase contract of 27 September 1650 du Parquet became sole owner of the islands of Martinique, Grenada, Saint Lucia and the Grenadines, to enjoy and dispose of them as he chose, subject only to the King's charges and conditions that the company had accepted in 1642. The oldest son of Bonnard and du Parquet, named Dyel d'Esnambuc after his great-uncle, was born on 12 June 1650. Their second son, Louis Dyel du Parquet, was born on 9 February 1653.

== Governor of Martinique ==
Du Parquet died in Saint-Pierre on 3 January 1658 aged 52. After his death his wife took charge of the island as regent in the name of her oldest son, Dyel d'Esnambuc. François Rolle de Laubière, who had married du Parquet's cousin, was appointed guardian of his children. A struggle began between two factions on the island, the Parisians and the Normans. Bonnard depended on the capable Sieur de Maubray for advice. This alarmed Médéric Rolle de Goursolas, Lieutenant-General of Martinique, who spread a rumour that Maubray was her lover and wanted to seize power.

The Normans named the Sieur de Plainville, a lawyer, as procureur-syndic on 22 July 1658. Maubray retired to Case-Pilote, then to Antigua. However, on the pretext that Bonnard was continuing to correspond with Maubray, Plainville arrested and imprisoned her. Several officers who supported her were dismissed and placed under house arrest. Gourselas presided over an assembly on 6 August where all these acts were confirmed, and signed the minutes with Plainville.

== Death ==
After Bonnard agreed to renounce the government, she was freed and restored to her property. On 15 September 1658 the King appointed her oldest son Governor and Lieutenant General of Martinique and Saint Lucia, with his uncle Adrien Dyel de Vaudroques, to act in his place until he reached the age of 20. Vaudroques delayed leaving France for a long time. Marie became extremely weak, suffered physical pain and eventually became paralyzed. She decided to seek a cure for her illness with the waters of Bourbonne-les-Bains, and took ship with her cousin Mme de Francillon and some of her officers. However, she died during the passage, and due to the superstition of some of the passengers her body was thrown overboard.

Vaudroque finally embarked from Dieppe in October 1659 and reached Martinique six weeks later. He was an ineffective governor, and died on 25 September 1662, to be succeeded by Jean Dyel de Clermont, cousin of Bonnard's children. Clermont also proved ineffective. On 14 April 1664 the King revoked all grants to the Compagnie des Isles de l'Amerique and all sales and transfers it had made to private parties, and on 28 May 1664 the Compagnie des Indes Occidentales was established by royal decree in its place. Bonnard du Parquet's heirs were forced to sell Martinique and Saint Lucia to the new company on 14 August 1665.

Marie Bonnard's life was the basis for the 1948 historical novel Marie des Isles by Robert Gaillard. This in turn was the basis for the 1959 French-Italian historical adventure film Marie of the Isles directed by Georges Combret and starring Belinda Lee, Alain Saury and Darío Moreno.

== Sources ==
- Boucher, Philip P. (29 December 2010), France and the American Tropics to 1700: Tropics of Discontent?, JHU Press, ISBN 978-1-4214-0202-4
- Eyma, Xavier (1860), Le roi des tropiques (in French), M. Lévy Frères
- Favre, Jean Hervé, "Jacques DYEL de VAUDROQUE du PARQUET", Geneanet (in French)
- Jesse, C. (December 1967), "SOLD FOR A SONG: Du Parquet Buys St. Lucia, Together with Martinique, Grenada, the Grenadines, In A.D. 1650, for £1660 Sterling", Caribbean Quarterly, 13 (4), Taylor & Francis, Ltd., JSTOR 40653043
- Margry, Pierre (1863), Origines transatlantiques: Belain d'Esnambuc et les Normands aux Antilles, d'après des documents nouvellement retrouvés (in French), A. Faure
- Margry, Pierre (1878), "Origines Francaises des Pays d'Outre-Mer", Revue maritime et coloniale (in French), Le Ministère
- "La saga de Marie des Isles", Wanted Rare Book.com (in French), archived from the original on 2012-08-28
- Rège, Philippe (2009), Encyclopedia of French Film Directors, vol. 1, Scarecrow Press
- Petitjean Roget, Jacques, ed. (1975), Histoire de l’isle de Grenade en Amérique 1649-1659. (1659) (in French), Montréal: Les Presses de l’Université de Montréal
