= Pierre de Vaugiraud =

French officer and administrator (1741–1819)

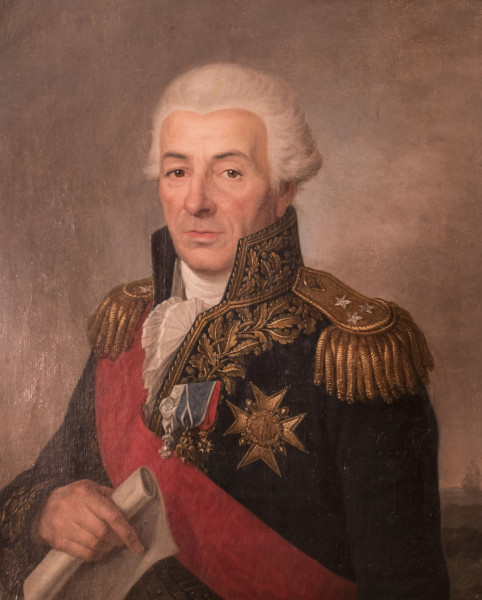

Governor of Martinique
- In office 1814–1818
- Monarch: Louis XVIII
- Preceded by: Sir John Lindsay; (British occupation)
- Succeeded by: François-Xavier Donzelot

Personal details
- Born: 27 December 1741 Les Sables d'Olonne, France
- Died: 13 March 1819 (aged 77) Paris, France

Military service
- Allegiance: Kingdom of France; French Royalists
- Branch/service: French Navy; Army of Condé
- Rank: Vice admiral (French Navy)
- Commands: Fox; Gracieuse
- Battles/wars: Seven Years' War; Battle of Quiberon Bay; American Revolutionary War; Battle of Ushant (1778); Battle of Fort Royal; Invasion of Tobago; Battle of the Chesapeake; Siege of Yorktown; Battle of Saint Kitts; Battle of the Saintes; French Revolutionary Wars; Invasion of France (1795)

Vice-Admiral Pierre René Marie de Vaugiraud de Rosnay (Note: Also spelt "Vaugirauld") (27 December 1741 — 13 March 1819) was a French military officer and colonial administrator who served as the governor of Martinique from 1814 to 1818. Born in Les Sables d'Olonne into an aristocratic family, Vaugiraud joined the French Navy in 1755 and served in the Seven Years' War and American Revolutionary War. A counter-revolutionary who opposed the French Revolution, Vaugiraud joined the Army of Condé and participated in the failed invasion of France in 1795.

== Life ==
Pierre René Marie de Vaugiraud de Rosnay was born on 27 December 1741 in Les Sables d'Olonne into an aristocratic family. His brother Marie Joseph Pierre de Vaugiraud served as the bishop of Angers. Vaugiraud joined the French Navy as a Garde-Marine on 12 December 1755. In 1756, during the Seven Years' War, he served on Éveillé in the Caribbean, taking part in the capture of HMS Greenwich on 18 March 1757. Vaugiraud subsequently transferred to Orient, on which he took part in the Battle of Quiberon Bay on 20 November 1759. In 1762 Vaugiraud was promoted to ship-of-the-line ensign and on 1 October 1773 he was promoted again to ship-of-the-line lieutenant.

During the American Revolutionary War Vaugiraud served on Couronne during the Battle of Ushant on 27 July 1778. He proceeded to briefly command Fox before transferring to Bretagne, serving as a staff officer of a French squadron under Louis Guillouet, comte d'Orvilliers. Following his promotion to ship-of-the-line captain on 4 April 1780, which was confirmed on 9 May 1781, he transferred as a staff officer to the fleet under François Joseph Paul de Grasse, serving on de Grasse's flagship Ville de Paris. Vaugiraud took part in the Battle of Fort Royal on 30 April 1781 and the invasion of Tobago on 30 May. On 22 July 1781, while de Grasse's fleet was anchored at Cap-Francais, Intrépide caught fire. Vaugiraud managed to have the ship sailed away, ran aground and evacuated before she exploded. He took part in the Battle of the Chesapeake on 5 September along with the siege of Yorktown before serving in the Battle of Saint Kitts on 25 January 1782. Vaugiraud was wounded at the Battle of the Saintes on 12 April 1782.

In 1785 Vaugiraud served on Railleuse and was given command of Gracieuse in 1788. In 1791, in the midst of the French Revolution, Vaugiraud fled France as part of a wave of French emigration and joined the counter-revolutionary Army of Condé. He took part in the failed invasion of France in 1795 before retiring to England. Following the Bourbon Restoration in France in 1814 Vaugiraud was promoted to vice admiral on 13 June and appointed as the governor of Martinique. He suppressed Bonapartists in Martinique during the Hundred Days but was recalled to Paris in 1818 due to his authoritarian administration. Vaugiraud died in Paris on 13 March 1819.

== Sources and references ==
Notes

Citations

References

- Contenson, Ludovic (1934). La Société des Cincinnati de France et la guerre d'Amérique (1778-1783). Paris: éditions Auguste Picard. OCLC 7842336.
- Hennequin, Joseph François Gabriel (1835). Biographie maritime ou notices historiques sur la vie et les campagnes des marins célèbres français et étrangers (in French). Vol. 3. Paris: Regnault éditeur. p. 357-341. OCLC 222612383.
- Lacour-Gayet, Georges (1910). La marine militaire de la France sous le règne de Louis XVI. Paris: Honoré Champion. pp. 431–434.
- Taillemite, Étienne (1982). Dictionnaire des Marins français. Paris: Éditions maritimes et d'Outre-Mer. ISBN 9782707000316.
