= Courbefy =

- Hamlet
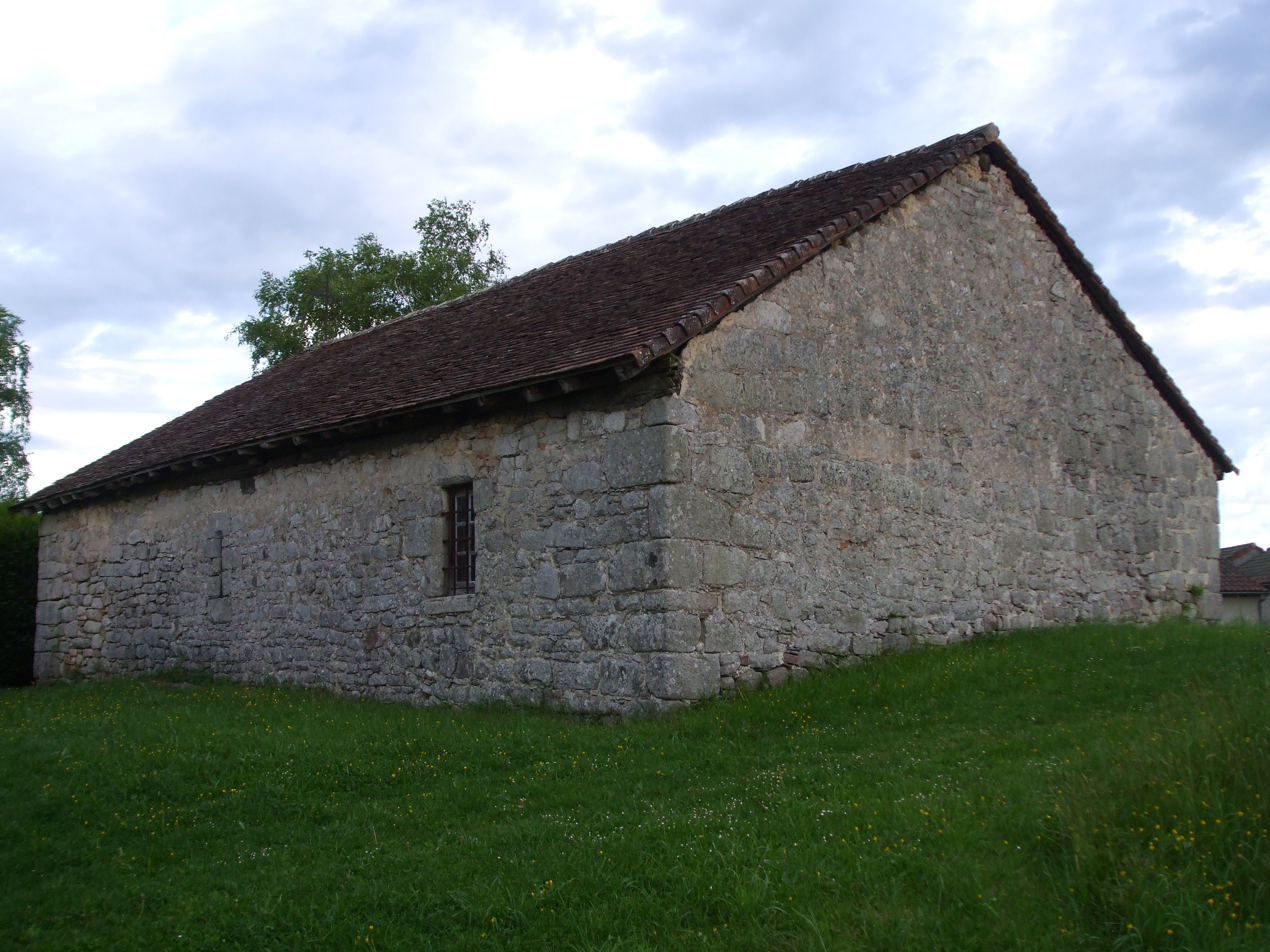
- The Chapel of Courbefy
- Interactive map of Courbefy
- Coordinates: 45.5945°N 1.0521°E
- Country: France
- Region: Nouvelle-Aquitaine
- Department: Haute-Vienne
- Commune: Bussière-Galant
- Elevation: 530 m (1,740 ft)

Population (2012)
  - Total: 0
- Postal Code: 87230

Courbefy (French pronunciation: [kuʁbəfi]) is a hamlet in the Bussière-Galant commune in the Haute-Vienne department of the Nouvelle-Aquitaine region in western France.

On an auction on 21 May 2012, the abandoned village was bought by Yoo Byung-eun for €520,000 (US$663,000). Yoo had seen it on CNN, and wanted to set up an "environmental, artistic and cultural" project in the village.

== Geography ==
Courbefy is a small hamlet located at an altitude of c.530 metres (1,740 ft) in the Bussière-Galant commune in the department of Haute-Vienne. It is about 6 kilometres (3.7 mi) south of the town of Bussière-Galant itself. The hamlet of Saint-Nicolas-Courbefy is located 2 kilometres (1.2 mi) to the southeast.

The village occupies a vaguely oval space and is totally surrounded by woods, with the exception of the southern part.

== History ==
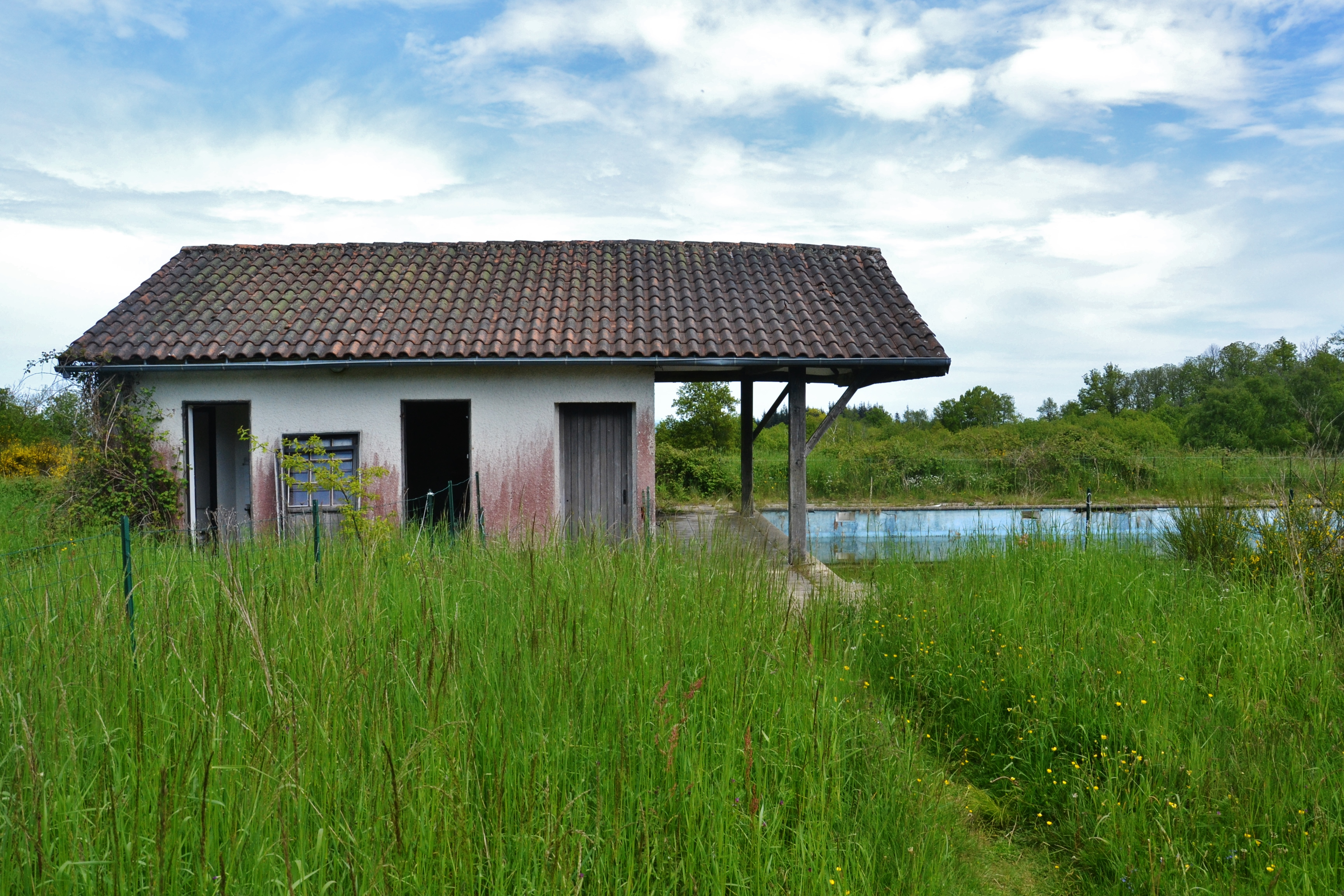
An abandoned house in Courbefy, May 2013.

The village of Courbefy initially had a medieval royal fortress, but it became a den of thieves, and the castle was destroyed in the sixteenth century by order of the consuls of Limoges.

During the French Revolution, Courbefy was a separate municipality. It merged in 1800 with Saint-Nicolas to form Saint-Nicolas-Courbefy. Bussière-Galant absorbed Saint-Nicolas-Courbefy in 1974.

In the late twentieth century and early twenty-first century, the last resident of Courbefy bought one by one all the houses and lands of the village, after having built a hotel and restaurant in the 1990s. In 2008 he went bankrupt and left the village. In February 2012, a judicial procedure assigned his property to a creditor bank, which then put the whole hamlet up for auction. On 21 May 2012, the village was acquired by Yoo Byung-eun for €520,000 (US$663,000).

== Monuments ==
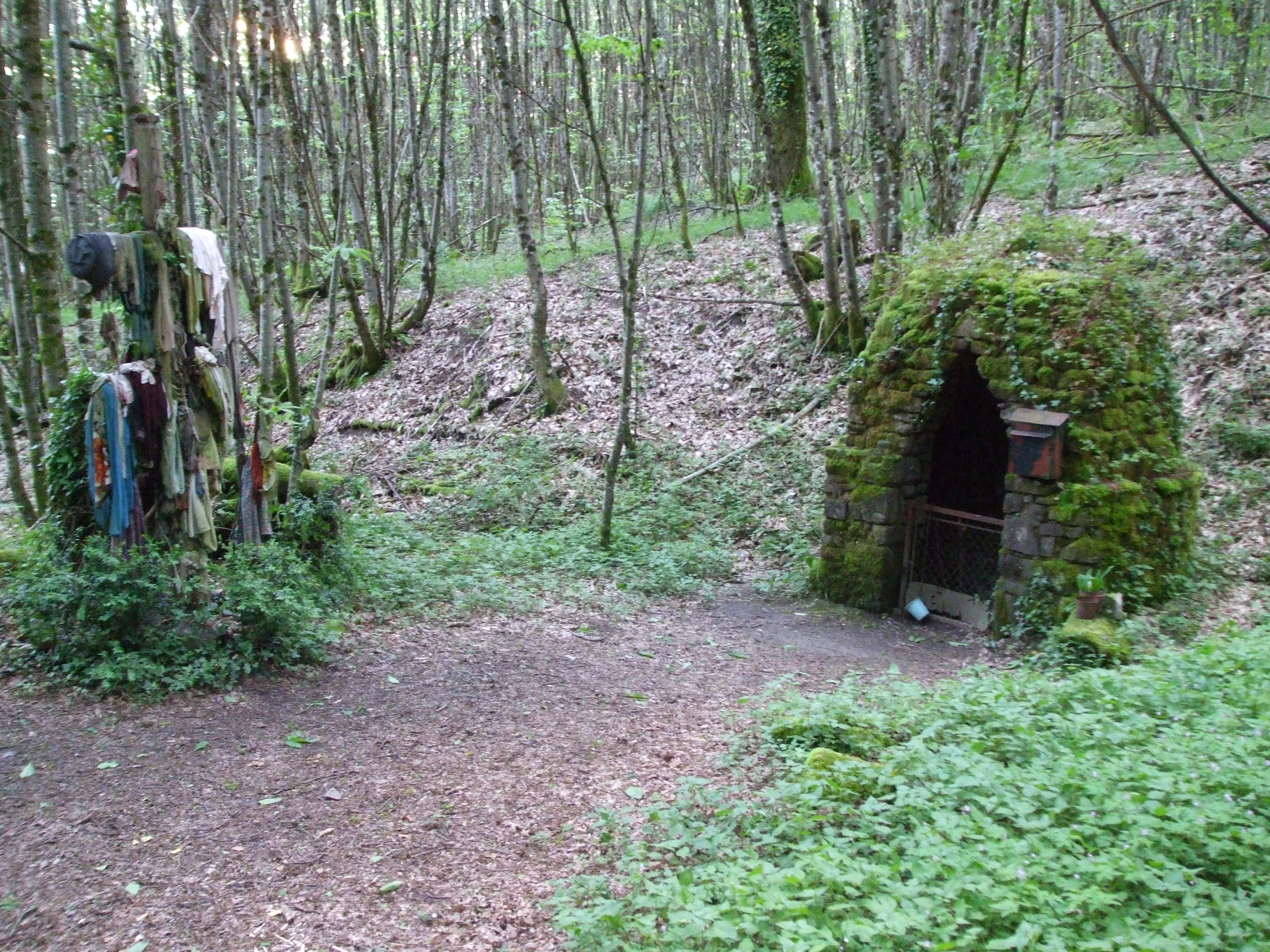
One of three holy wells in Courbefy to the right and a cross of devotion left.

A small chapel of the seventeenth century lies a few dozen meters from the old dungeon.

Courbefy has three holy wells located a few hundred meters from the chapel. One of them is still used as evidenced by the numerous offerings of pieces of cloth, children's shoes or diapers. They seem to be dedicated to Saint Eutropius.

== Image gallery ==
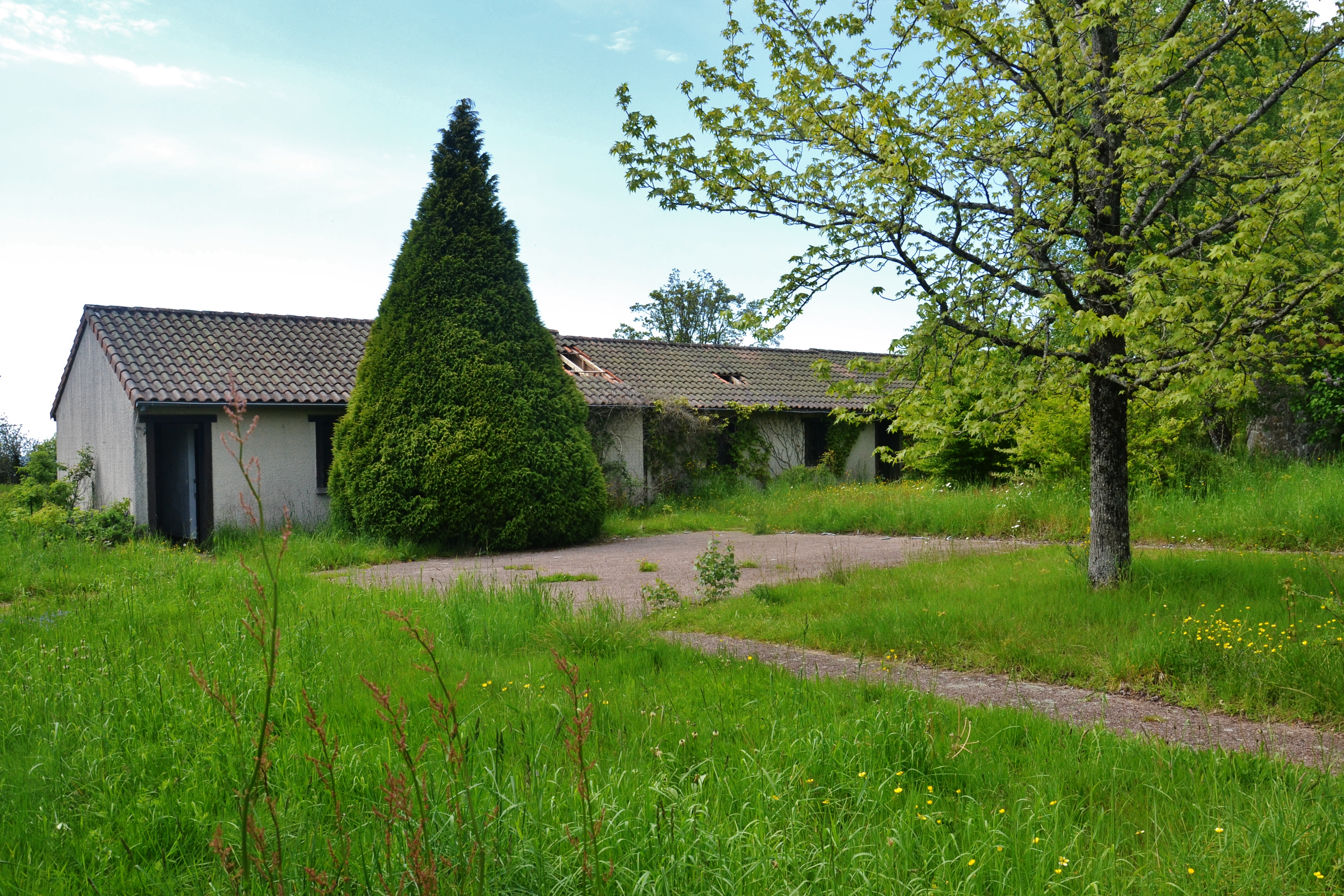
The abandoned village

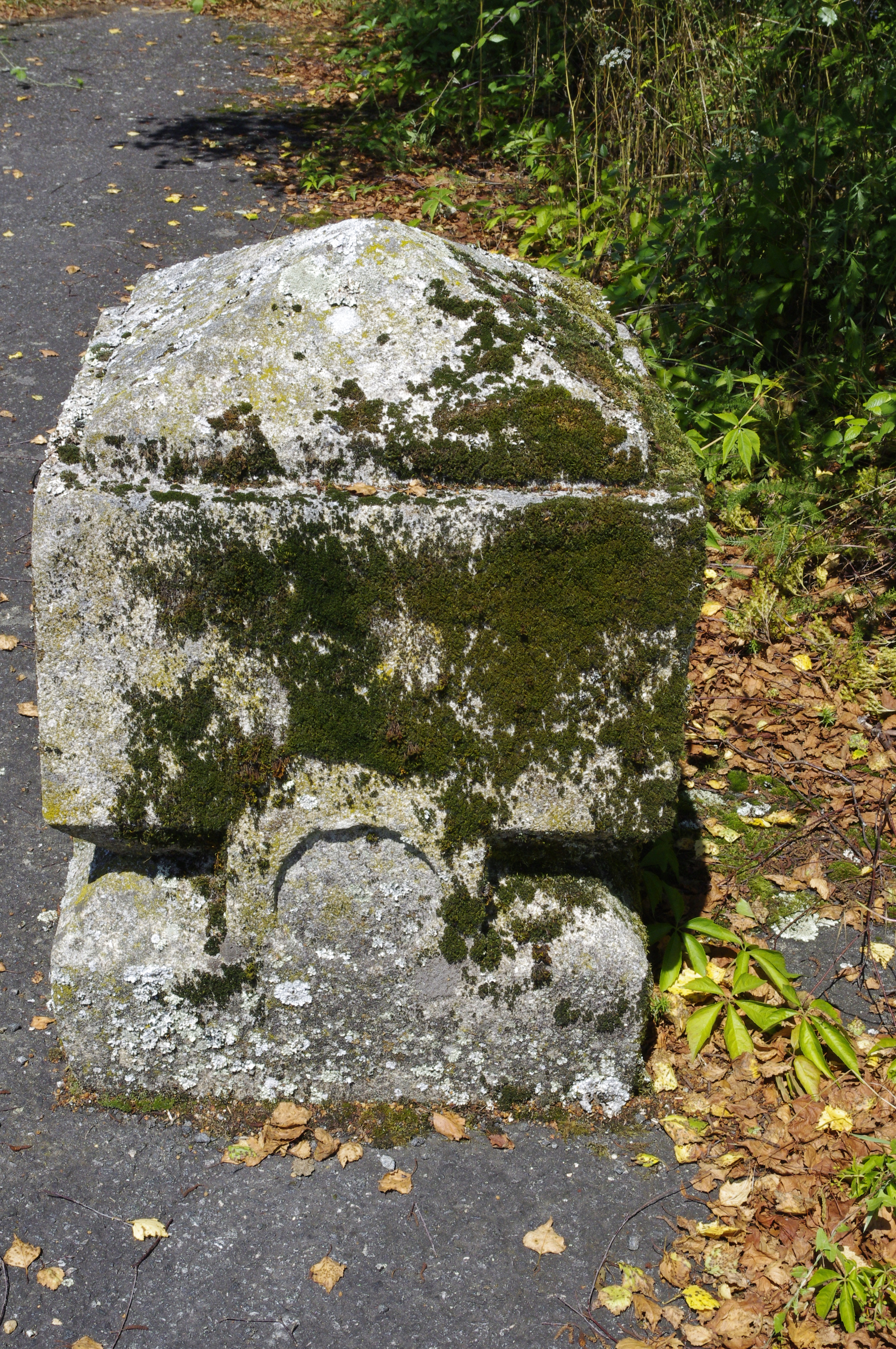
Carved stone in front of a house

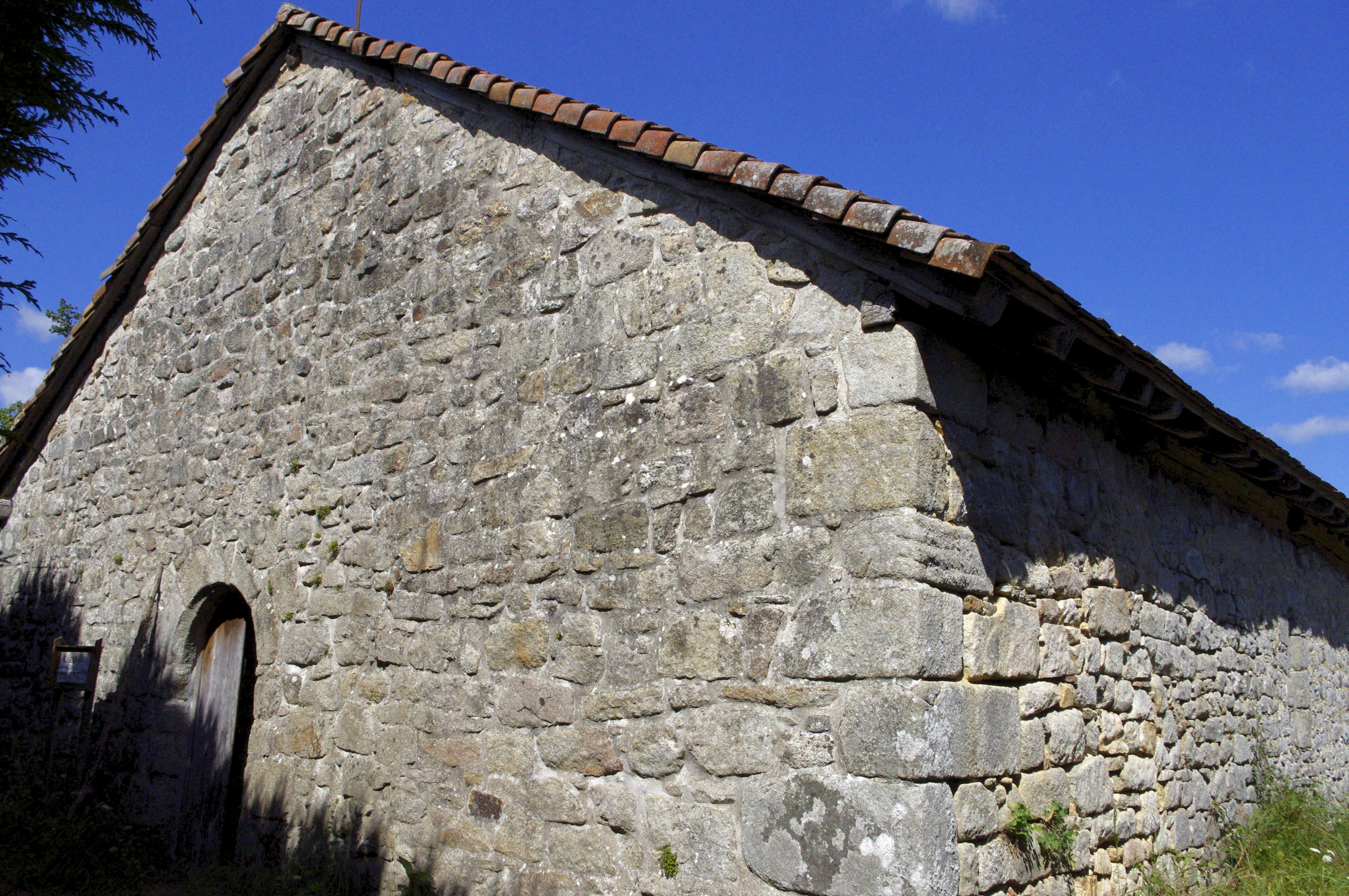
Entrance to the chapel

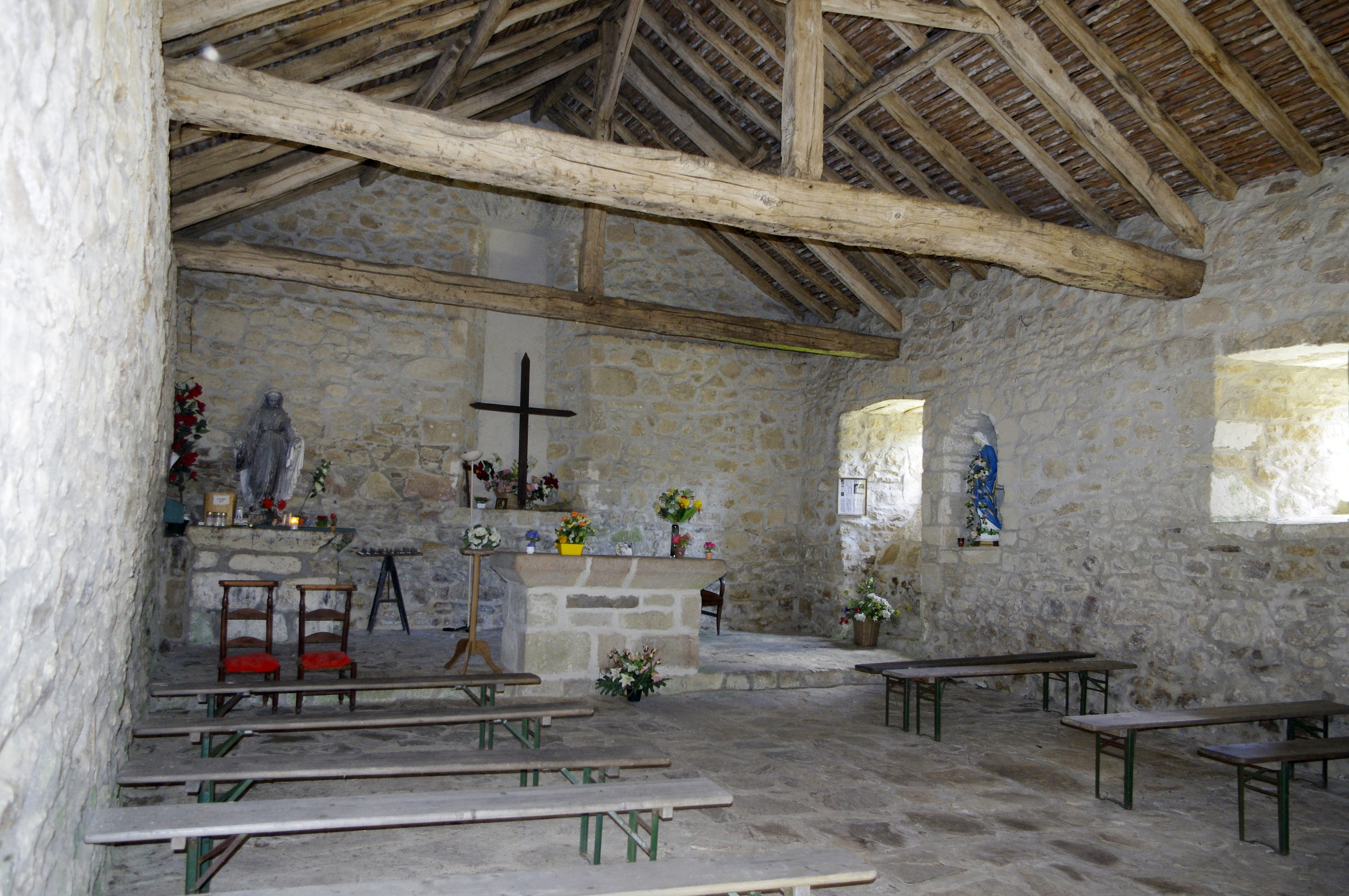
Inside the chapel

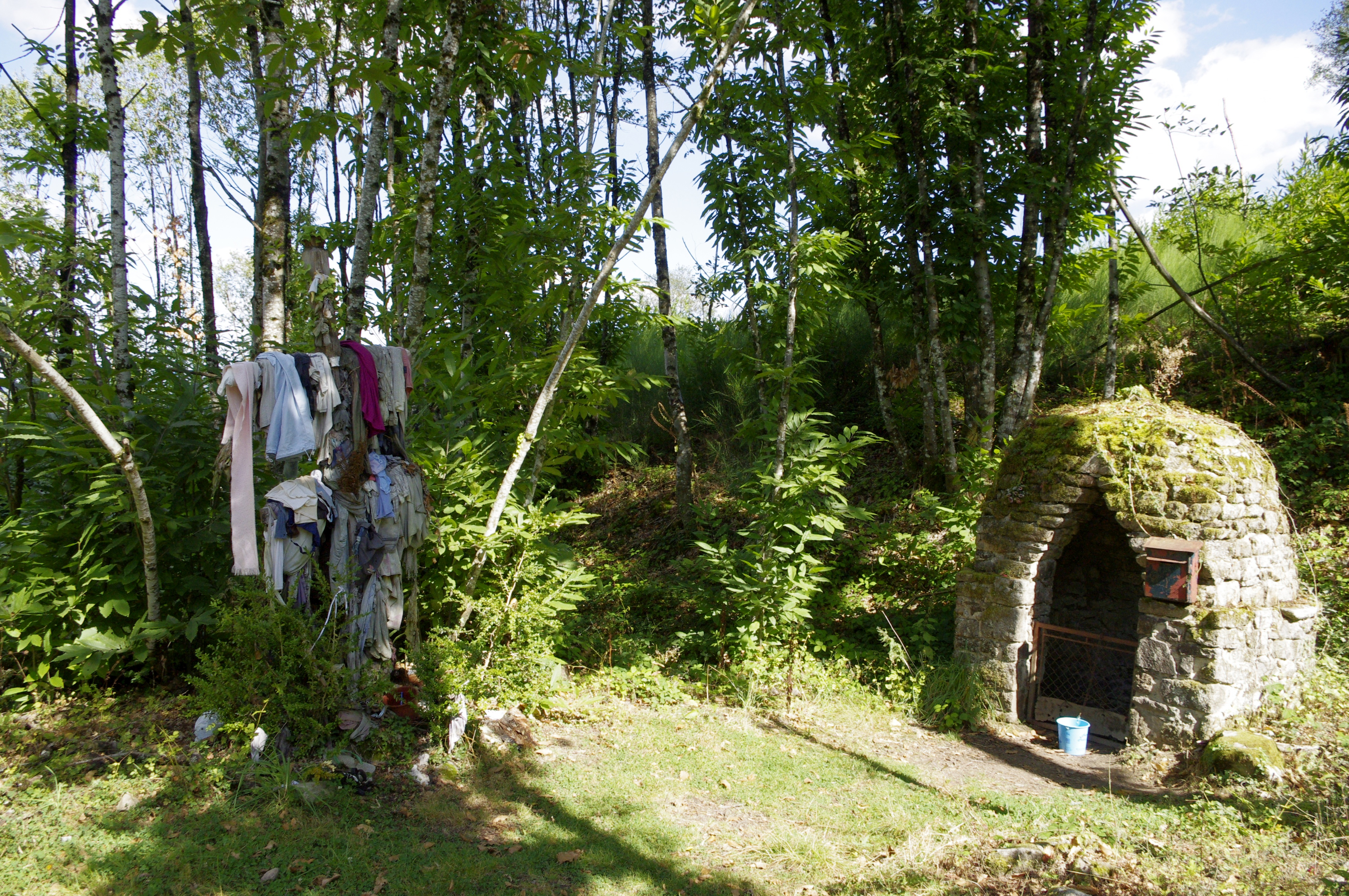
The holy well closest to the chapel

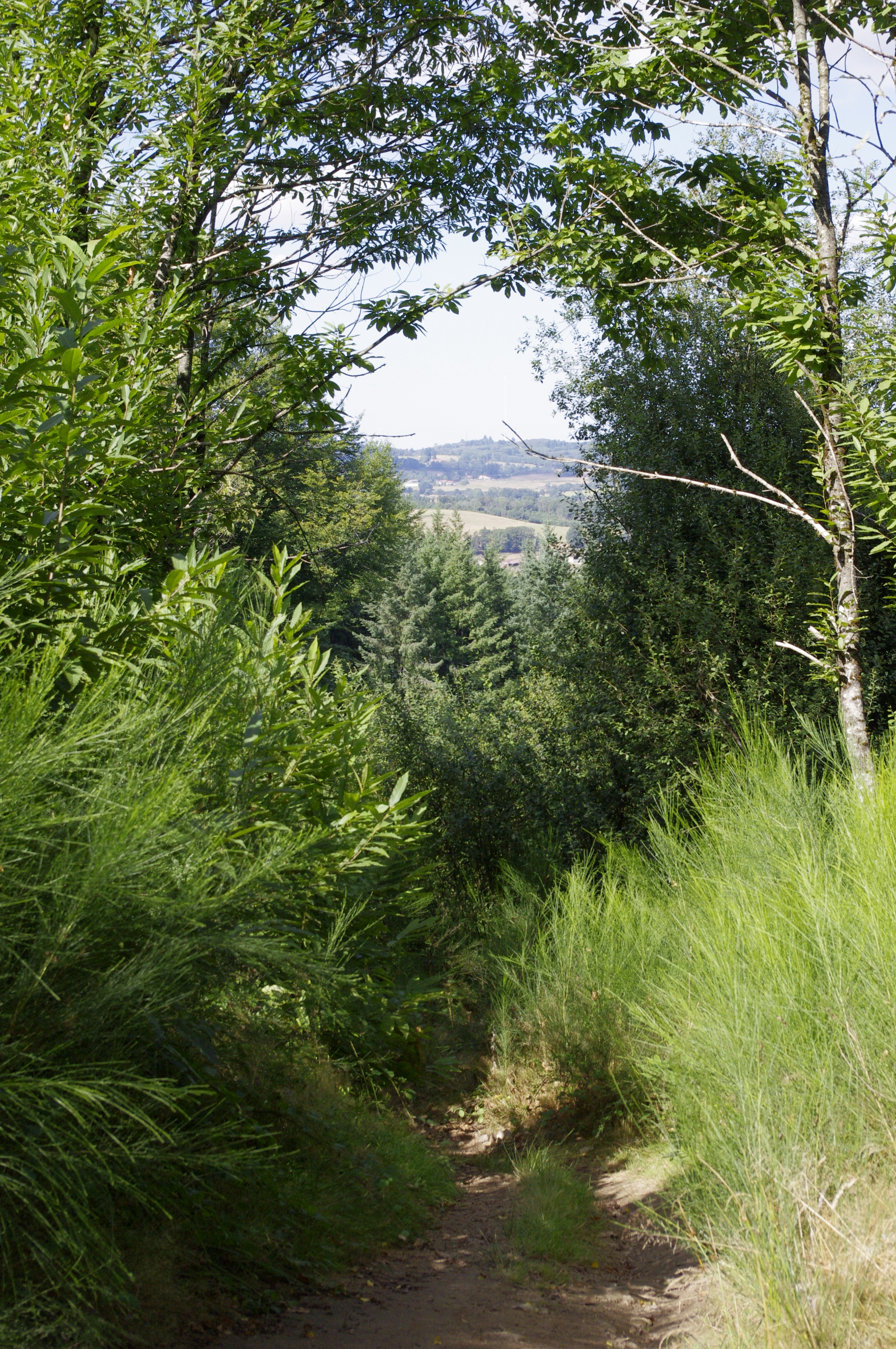
Descent towards the second holy well

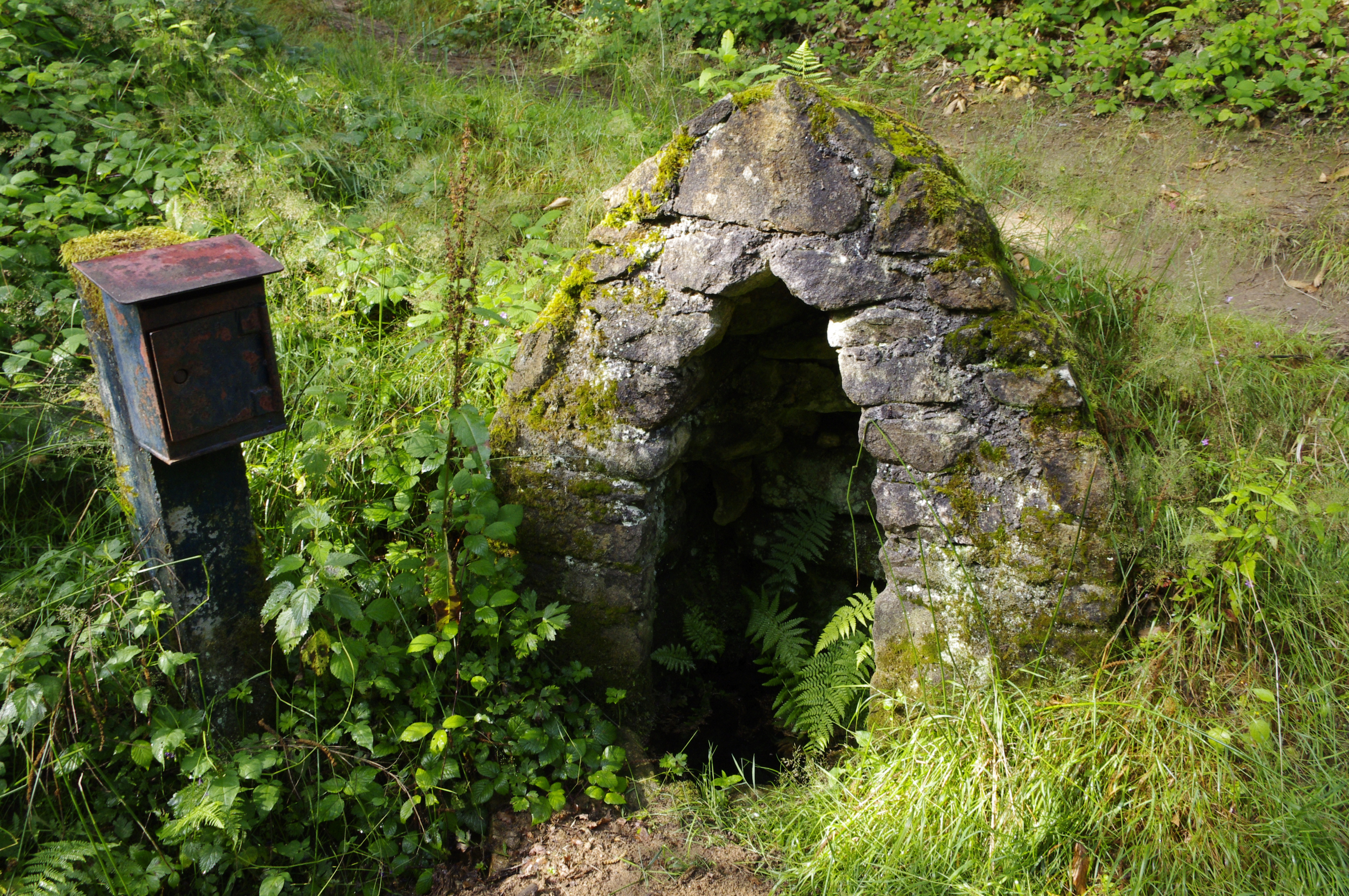
The second holy well

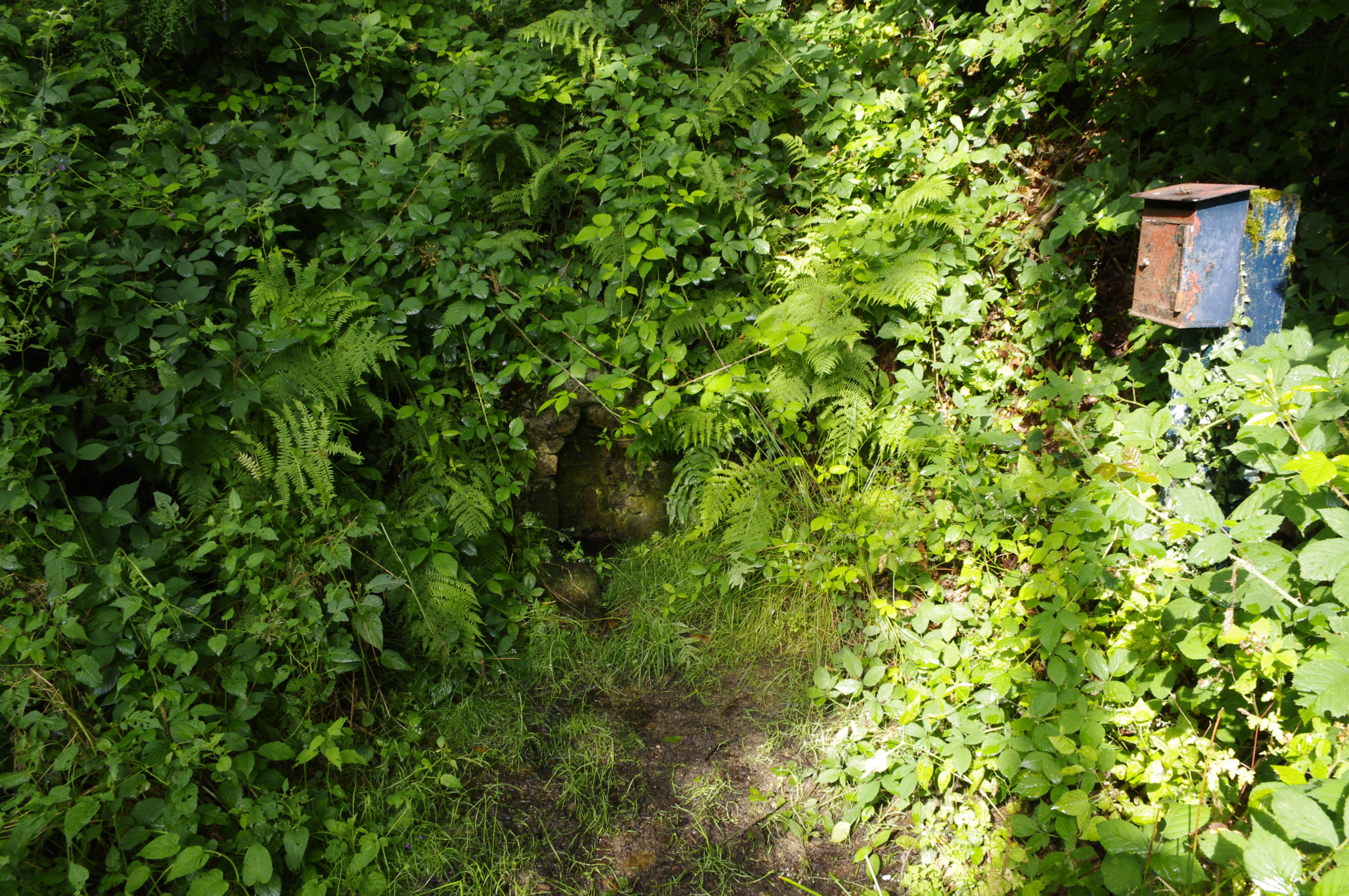
The third holy well, visibly in use
