= Bussière-Galant =

- Commune
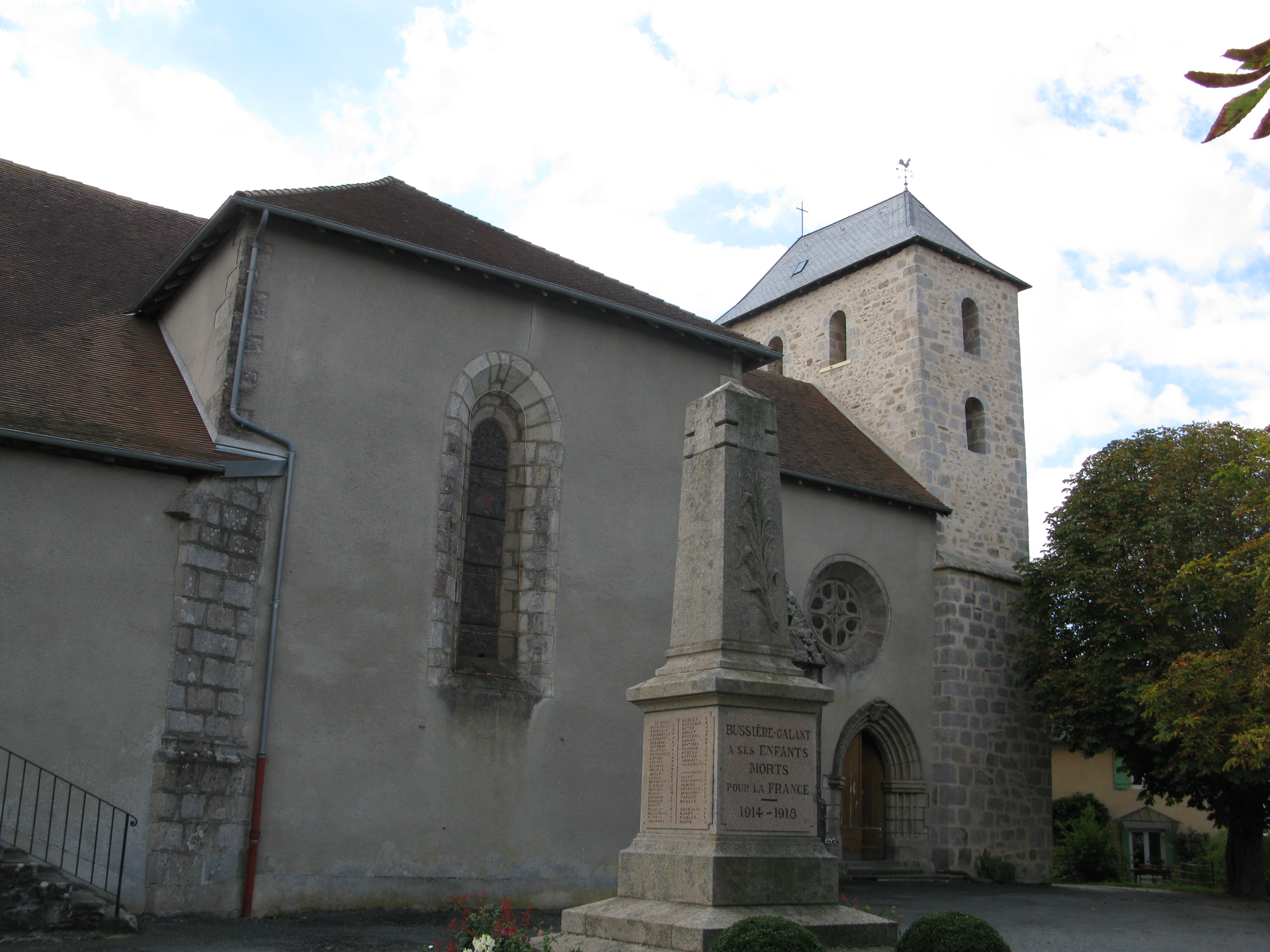
- The church of Saint-Martin, in Bussière-Galant

- Coat of arms
- Location of Bussière-Galant
- Location within France Location within Nouvelle-Aquitaine
- Coordinates: 45°37′41″N 1°02′16″E
- Country: France
- Region: Nouvelle-Aquitaine
- Department: Haute-Vienne
- Arrondissement: Limoges
- Canton: Saint-Yrieix-la-Perche

Government
  - Mayor (2020–2026): Emmanuel Dexet
- Area^{1}: 53.86 km^{2} (20.80 sq mi)
- Highest elevation: 551 m (1,808 ft)
- Lowest elevation: 338 m (1,109 ft)
- Population (2023): 1,298
  - Density: 24.10/km^{2} (62.42/sq mi)
- Time zone: UTC+01:00 (CET)
  - Summer (DST): UTC+02:00 (CEST)
- INSEE/Postal code: 87027 /87230
- ^{1} French Land Register data, which excludes lakes, ponds, glaciers > 1 km^{2} (0.386 sq mi or 247 acres) and river estuaries.

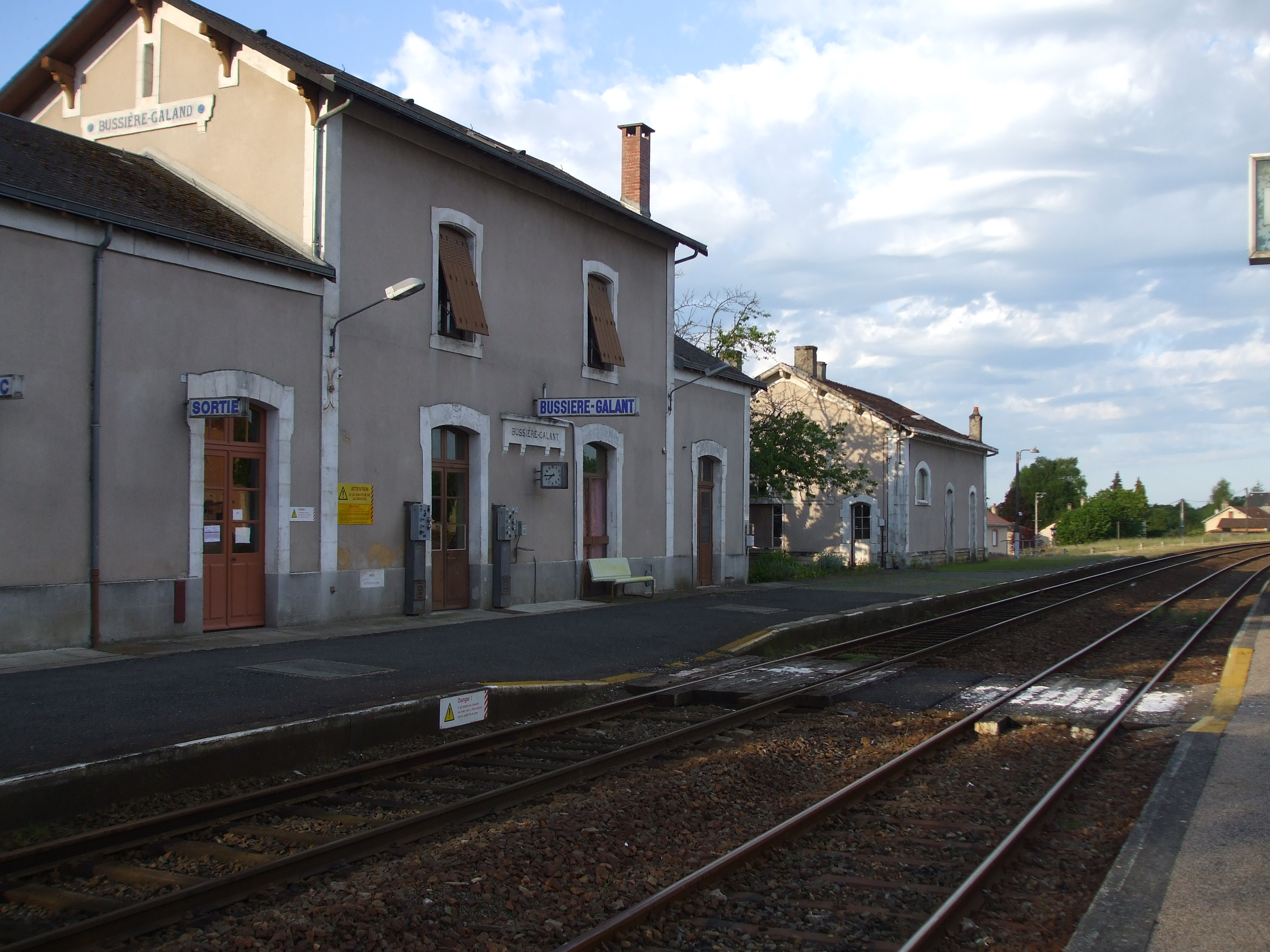
The railway station in Bussière-Galant

Bussière-Galant (French pronunciation: [bysjɛʁ ɡalɑ̃]; Occitan: Bussiera Galand) is a commune in the Haute-Vienne department in the Nouvelle-Aquitaine region in western France. Bussière-Galant station has rail connections to Bordeaux, Périgueux and Limoges.

Inhabitants are known as Bussiérois.

== Elephant Haven ==
In 2017, construction of a "retirement home" for elephants named Elephant Haven was begun in the commune of Saint-Nicolas-Courbefy, not far from Bussière-Galant.

== Notable people ==
- Irène de Maulmont, known as Gina Palerme (1885 - 1977), is an actress, dancer and singer of French music hall
- Yoo Byung-eun businessman and a South Korean amateur photographer. Owner of the village of Courbefy located in the commune

== See also ==
- Communes of the Haute-Vienne department
