= Adrien Dyel de Vaudroques =

French aristocrat and governor of Martinique

Adrien Dyel, Seigneur de Vaudrocques et de Gournay

Governor of Martinique
- In office 15 September 1658 – 24 October 1662
- Preceded by: Marie Bonnard du Parquet
- Succeeded by: Médéric Rolle de Goursolas (acting); Jean Dyel de Clermont

Personal details
- Born: 1605
- Died: October 24, 1662 (aged 56–57)

Adrien Dyel, Seigneur de Vaudrocques et de Gournay (1605 – 24 October 1662) was a member of the French minor aristocracy who was governor of Martinique from 1658 to 1662.

== Family ==
The Dyel family originated in the Pays de Caux, Normandy. There is a record of Robert Dyel in the register of fiefs of Normandy in 1150. Adrien Dyel, Seigneur de Vaudrocques was born in 1605. His parents were Simon Pierre Dyel, Seigneur de Vaudrocque et du Parquet (born 1565) and Adrienne Belain d'Esnambuc (born 1574). In 1642 de Vaudrocques married Anne Le Moine. They had four children, of whom their oldest was Louis Dyel, Seigneur de Gournay, de Vaudrocques et de Limpiville. The others were Pierre, who died young; René, who became a cavalry captain and died in service, and Susanne.

Adrien Dyel de Vaudrocques was the brother of Jacques Dyel du Parquet, one of the first governors of Martinique. Jacques Dyel du Parquet was lord and owner of Martinique, Grenada and Saint-Christophe. He died in Saint-Pierre, Martinique on 3 January 1658 aged 52. His wife Marie Bonnard du Parquet took charge of the island as regent in the name of her oldest son, Louis Dyel du Parquet d'Esnambuc. Vaudroques became the tutor of the du Parquet boys.

== Governor of Martinique ==
On 15 September 1658 the king appointed d'Esnambuc Governor and Lieutenant General of Martinique and Saint Lucia, with de Vaudrocques to act in his place until he reached the age of 20. Vaudroques delayed leaving France for a long time. He finally embarked from Dieppe in October 1659 and reached Martinique six weeks later. His administration was short and mediocre. He earned a poor reputation in France and was not popular with the settlers. On 21 September Jean-Baptiste Colbert said that Vaudroques was incapable of governing himself, and therefore of governing the people of the island. He had associated himself only with the most debauched and those who had abandoned themselves to all sort of violence, that not only was military discipline no longer observed or justice administered, but trade had been entirely lost to the French.

In fairness, Vaudroques had to defend the colony against the Caribs, who continued to fight in all the islands. On 31 March 1660 the French and English agreed to act together in defense against the Caribs, from whom they solicited a peace treaty. Vaudroques also had to oppose a huge project to control Martinique by superintendent Nicolas Fouquet, who sent two emissaries to the island charged with buying up all the valuable properties. They settled in Trois-Rivières, where they even built military fortifications. Fouquet thought that by using intermediaries he would conceal his true intentions to usurp the property of the du Parquet boys. The project came to an end when he fell from grace. De Vaudrocques died on 24 October 1662 and Médéric Rolle de Goursolas took charge as interim governor. The colonists lobbied to have the deputy de Valmenières appointed governor, but the king accepted the request of the guardians of the du Parquet children and appointed Jean Dyel de Clermont.

== Sources ==
- Banbuck, C.A. (1935), Histoire politique, économique et sociale de la Martinique sous l'Ancien Régime (in French), Paris: Marcel Riviere
- Bois, François-Alexandre Aubert de La Chesnaye Des (1772), Dictionnaire de la noblesse (contenant les généalogies, l'histoire et la chronologie des familles nobles de France: l'explication de leurs armes, & l'état des grandes terres du royaume) (in French), chez la Vve Duchesne
- Boucher, Philip P. (29 December 2010), France and the American Tropics to 1700: Tropics of Discontent?, JHU Press, ISBN 978-1-4214-0202-4
- Cahoon, Ben, "Martinique", Worldstatesmen.org
- Favre, Jean Hervé, "Adrien DYEL DE VAUDROQUES", Geneanet (in French)
- Jesse, C. (December 1967), "SOLD FOR A SONG: Du Parquet Buys St. Lucia, Together with Martinique, Grenada, the Grenadines, In A.D. 1650, for £1660 Sterling", Caribbean Quarterly, 13 (4), Taylor & Francis, Ltd.: 44–52, JSTOR 40653043
- Margry, Pierre (1863), Origines transatlantiques: Belain d'Esnambuc et les Normands aux Antilles, d'après des documents nouvellement retrouvés (in French), A. Faure, hdl:2027/hvd.32044080401623
- Margry, Pierre (1878), "Origines Francaises des Pays d'Outre-Mer", Revue maritime et coloniale (in French), Le Ministère
