= Jean Dyel de Clermont =

French aristocrat

Jean Dyel, Seigneur de Clermont et d'Enneval

Governor of Martinique
- In office 5 June 1663 – 19 January 1665
- Preceded by: Adrien Dyel de Vaudrocques; Médéric Rolle de Goursolas (acting)
- Succeeded by: Robert de Clodoré

Jean Dyel, Seigneur de Clermont et d'Enneval was a French aristocrat who was governor of Martinique from 1662 to 1665. The island had been the property of his cousin, Jacques Dyel du Parquet, and he was appointed governor in the name of his cousin's young sons. In 1664 the island was assigned to the newly formed French West India Company, and de Clermont was replaced by the company's appointee early in 1665.

== Family ==
The Dyel family originated in the Pays de Caux, Normandy. There is a record of Robert Dyel in the register of fiefs of Normandy in 1150. Jacques Dyel du Parquet (died 3 January 1658) was one of the first governors of Martinique. He was lord and owner of Martinique, Grenada and Saint-Christophe. The Clermont-d'Enneval branch was founded by Nicolas Dyel, cousin of Jacques Dyel du Parquet. Jean Dyel, Seigneur de Clermont et d'Enneval, was the oldest son of Nicolas's grandson Adrien Dyel, Seigneur d'Enneval et de Clermont, who on 10 June 1624 had married Françoise de Vipart. Jean Dyel de Clermont married Marguerite d'Esparbès de Luffan. Their children were Jacques, seigneur de Clermont; Gabriel, brigadier of cavalry; Jean, Abbé de Clermont; and Marguerite, who died as a nun.

== Martinique ==
Jacques Dyel du Parquet died in Saint-Pierre, Martinique on 3 January 1658 aged 52. After his death his wife Marie Bonnard du Parquet took charge of the island as regent in the name of her oldest son, Louis Dyel d'Esnambuc. On 15 September 1658 the king appointed d'Esnambuc Governor and Lieutenant General of Martinique and Saint Lucia, with Jacques' brother Adrien Dyel de Vaudrocques to act in his place until he reached the age of 20. De Vaudrocques died on 24 October 1662 and Médéric Rolle de Goursolas took charge as interim governor.

In 1662 the king appointed de Clermont as governor and lieutenant-general of Martinique. He was governor for the du Parquet children. De Clermont took office on 5 June 1663. He proved to be an ineffective administrator. Alexandre de Prouville de Tracy was named the king's lieutenant general in the Americas on 19 November 1663. He left Rochelle on 25 February 1664, and after visiting Cayenne reached Martinique in early June 1664. He was formally recognized on 7 June 1664 by de Clermont, and had all the clergy, military and lay officials acknowledge the recently created Sovereign Council.

The French West Indies company was formed in May 1664, and acquired the islands from the du Parquet heirs. Robert de Clodoré was named governor of Martinique on 11 October 1664 by the newly formed French West India Company (Compagnie des Indes Occidentales). Clodoré arrived in Martinique and took formal possession of the island on 19 February 1665 in the presence of Tracy. Tracy left for Canada about the same time that de Clermont left for France with his two young du Parquet cousins. The company paid 240,000 livres to the Dyel heirs, with which their guardian bought them estates in Touraine and Normandy.

== Sources ==
- Aubert de La Chesnaye Des Bois, François-Alexandre (1772), Dictionnaire de la noblesse (contenant les généalogies, l'histoire et la chronologie des familles nobles de France: l'explication de leurs armes, & l'état des grandes terres du royaume) (in French), chez la Vve Duchesne
- Boucher, Philip P. (29 December 2010), France and the American Tropics to 1700: Tropics of Discontent?, JHU Press, ISBN 978-1-4214-0202-4
- Cahoon, Ben, "Martinique", Worldstatesmen.org
- Clément, Pierre; Brotonne, Pierre de (1865), Lettres, instructions et mémoires de Colbert (publiés d'après les ordres de l'empereur, sur la proposition de Son Excellence M. Magne, ministre secrétaire d'état des finances) (in French), Imprimerie impériale
- Guët, Isidore (1893), Origines de la Martinique. Le colonel François de Collart et la Martinique de son temps; colonisation, sièges, révoltes et combats de 1625 à1720, Vannes: Lafolye
- Jesse, C. (December 1967), "SOLD FOR A SONG: Du Parquet Buys St. Lucia, Together with Martinique, Grenada, the Grenadines, In A.D. 1650, for £1660 Sterling", Caribbean Quarterly, 13 (4), Taylor & Francis, Ltd., JSTOR 40653043
- Lampin, D., "Robert Le Fichot des Friches, sieur de Clodoré", La Martinique à la carte (in French)
- "L'histoire de la Martinique", Imago Mundi
- Margry, Pierre (1863), Origines transatlantiques: Belain d'Esnambuc et les Normands aux Antilles, d'après des documents nouvellement retrouvés (in French), A. Faure
- Margry, Pierre (1878), "Origines Francaises des Pays d'Outre-Mer", Revue maritime et coloniale (in French), Le Ministère
