= Marc Hyacinthe de Rosmadec =

French naval officer

Marc-Hyacinthe de Rosmadec

Governor of the French Antilles
- In office 4 January 1702 (appointed) – 14 May 1702 (died)
- Preceded by: Charles Desnotz then Charles de Guitaut (interim)
- Succeeded by: Charles de Guitaut (interim); Nicolas de Gabaret (interim); Charles-François de Machault de Belmont

Personal details
- Born: c. 1635
- Died: 14 May 1702 Havana, Cuba
- Occupation: Naval officer

Marc-Hyacinthe de Rosmadec (c. 1635 – 14 May 1702) was a French naval officer who was appointed governor general of the French Antilles but died before taking office.

== Family ==
Marc-Hyacinthe de Rosmadec was the second son of Sébastien de Rosmadec, marquis de Rosmadec and seigneur du Plexis-Josso, and of Julienne Bonnier (c. 1605-1674). His older brother Sébastien II (1626-78) was marquis du Plessis. Sébastien II's son was Sébastien III (born 1661), Comte de Rosmadec.

== Career ==
Rosmadec joined the navy and was named lieutenant de vaisseau in 1666, then capitaine de vaisseau in 1671. He served with distinction in actions in Sicily and the English Channel. From 3 October 1677 to 11 May 1678 Marc-Hyacinthe Rosmadec, Chevalier de Tréguier, was captain of the 64-gun Bourbon. In 1689 he was in command of the 56-gun Fort (formerly L'Ecueil). He served in the Fort in the Battle of Bantry Bay on 11 May 1689.

In 1690 Rosmadec acquired the Château de Rocheux and its 1,235 acres (500 ha) estate from the Rochechouart family. On 6 February 1694 the chevalier de Rosmadec, capitaine de vaisseau, was made a chevalier of the Order of Saint Louis. He was given this reward after 25 years of service. On 13 April 1697 he was appointed squadron commander.

== Appointment as governor general ==
The governor general of the Antilles Charles Desnotz died on 6 October 1701, and Charles de Pechpeyrou-Comminges de Guitaut was appointed interim governor general of the Antilles. Marc-Hyacinthe de Rosmadec was appointed to succeed Charles d'Esnos as governor general of the French Antilles on 4 January 1702. Marc-Hyacinthe died in Havana, Cuba on 14 May 1702. He died before taking up his post. His heir was Gabriel-Sébastien de Rosmadec, comte de Rocheux. Guitaud died on 7 September 1702 and was replaced as interim governor by Nicolas de Gabaret. Finally, Charles-François de Machault de Belmont took office in Martinique on 4 March 1703.

== Sources ==
- Chauleau, Liliane (1993), Dans les îles du vent: la Martinique (XVIIe-XIXe siècle), L'Harmattan, ISBN 2738421768
- d'Aspect (1780), Histoire de l'Ordre royal et militaire de St-Louis (in French), Duchesne
- Garric, Alain, Sébastien DE ROSMADEC Ier (in French)
- Gazette de France (1768), Table ou abrégé des cent trente-cinq volumes de la Gazette de France, depuis son commencement en 1631 jusqu'à la fin de l'année 1765 (in French), la Gazette de France
- Merlet, Lucien (1886), Registres et minutes des notaires du comte de Dunois (1369-à 1676). (in French), Garnier
- Pritchard, Pritchard, James S. (2004-01-22), In Search of Empire: The French in the Americas, 1670-1730, Cambridge University Press, ISBN 978-0-521-82742-3
- "The Troublied History of the Chateau", Château des Enigmes
- Therin, Henri THERIN (April 2018), "Le calvaire de Boscornou à Locmélar" (PDF), Apeve-Info (12)
- Troude, O. (1867), Batailles Navales de La France (in French), vol. 1, P. Levot
- Vilette-Mursay, Philippe de (1991), Mes campagnes de mer sous Louis XIV, Tallandier
