= Jean-Baptiste de Gennes =

French naval officer

Jean-Baptiste de Gennes, comte d'Oyac

Governor of Saint Christophe
- In office 1698–1702
- Preceded by: Charles de Pechpeyrou-Comminges de Guitaut to 1690, then British rule
- Succeeded by: British rule

Personal details
- Born: c. 1656 Guérande, Province of Brittany, France
- Died: 15 February 1705 Plymouth, Kingdom of England
- Occupation: Naval officer

Jean-Baptiste de Gennes, comte d'Oyac (c. 1656 – 15 February 1705) was a French naval officer who is known as an early French explorer of the Straits of Magellan. He was the last governor of the French colony of Saint-Christophe on the West Indian island now called Saint Kitts. After he surrendered the island to the English during the War of the Spanish Succession he was tried and found guilty of cowardice. He died before his appeal to this verdict could be heard. He was also an inventor, and among other devices invented a power loom driven by a mill wheel.

== Family and early years (1656–91) ==
Jean-Baptiste de Gennes was born around 1656 in Guérande, Loire-Atlantique. His father was Jean du Boisguy de Gennes, seigneur de Bourg Chevreuil. His mother was Anne Naudin du Vieux-Pont. He came from an old noble family of Brittany that had fallen into great poverty. To maintain the family his father "exercised a mechanical art that is a necessary part of medicine." Louis Victor de Rochechouart de Mortemart, when visiting Brittany, was struck by the spirit and ability of the young Gennes and took him to Messina. He then made him enter the navy, where he served with distinction and became known to Jean-Baptiste Colbert and then to Louis and Jérôme Phélypeaux, secretaries of state for the navy, who employed him on various dangerous missions.

Gennes married twice. He had two or three daughters from the first marriage. His second marriage was to the daughter of a rich merchant of La Rochelle named Savouret. His marriage to Marie Savouret took place on 1 June 1690. They had two children, Jean Guillaume and Anne Henriette. His son also joined the navy.

== Naval captain (1691–98) ==
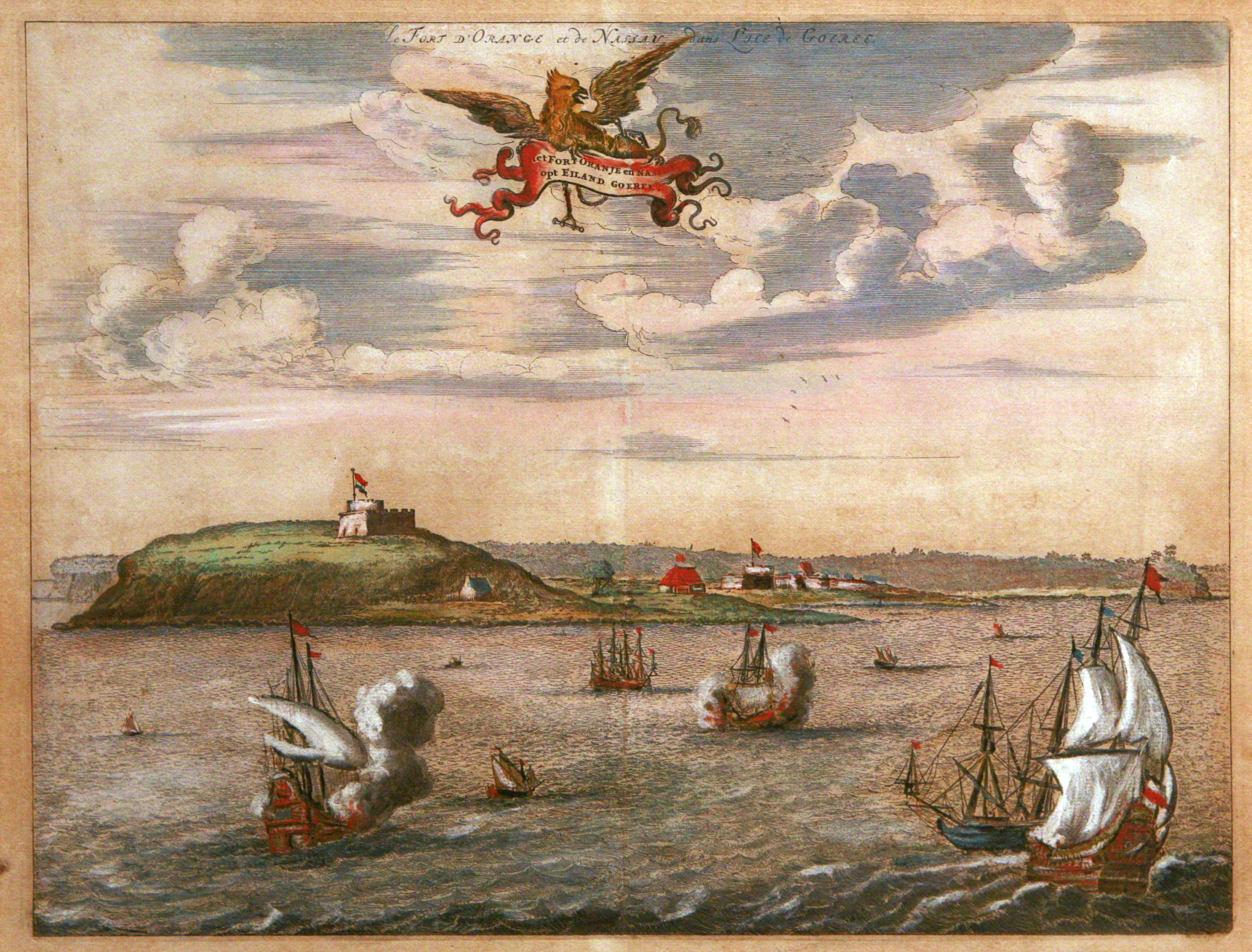
Gorée island, 17th century

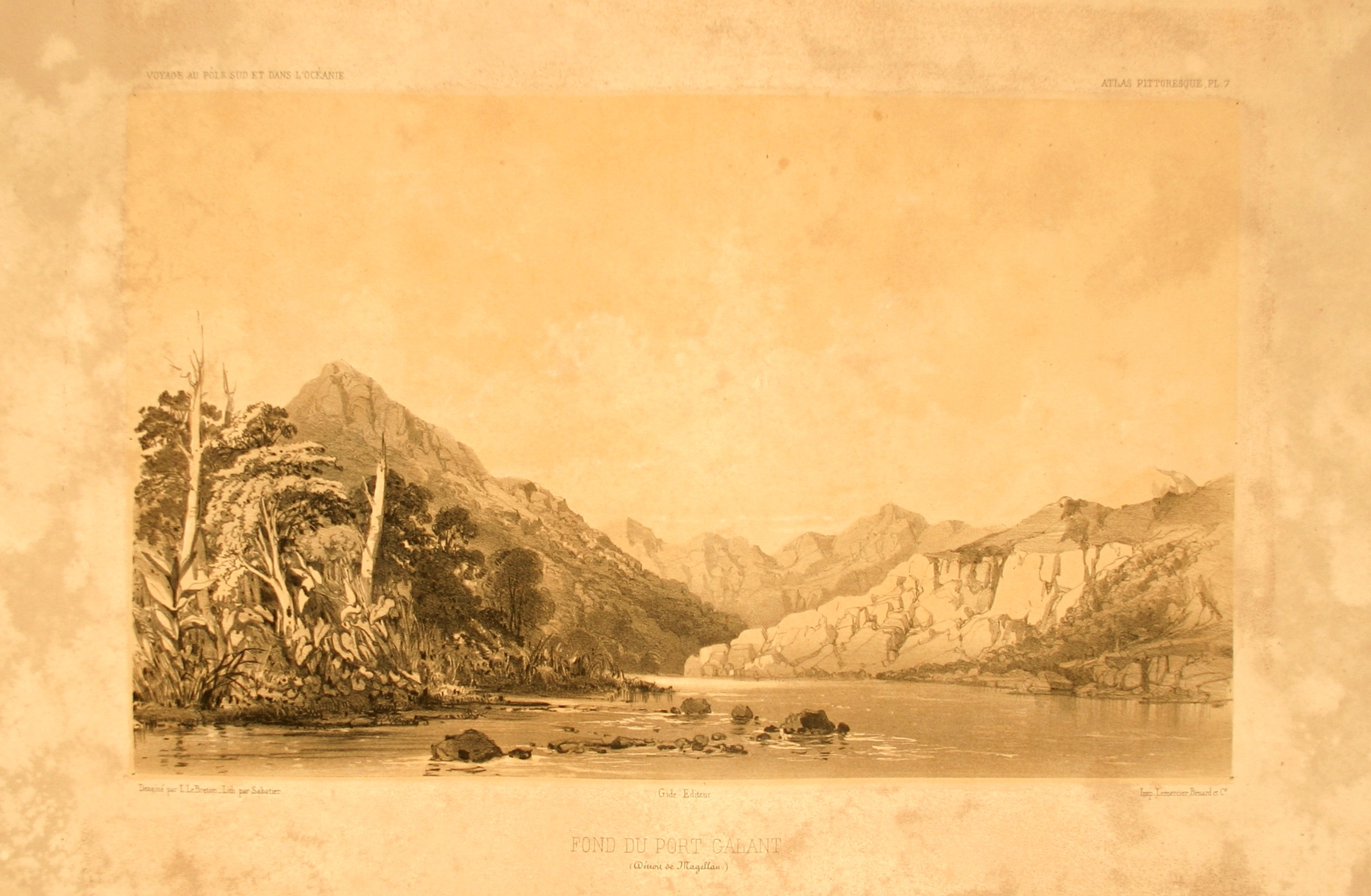
Port Galant, Strait of Magellan

Gennes was made chevalier of the Order of Saint Louis. He was appointed capitaine de vaisseau (ship-of-the-line captain) in 1691, aged about 35.

In 1695 Gennes was given command of a squadron of the king's navy armed by some private individuals who had obtained permission to make an establishment in the Strait of Magellan, or near there in the north or south sea. Gennes left La Rochelle on 3 June 1695 in command of a fleet of five vessels, the largest being the Faucon (46) and the Soleil d'Afrique (32). The fleet was at Gorée off what is now Senegal from 3–19 July 1695, and in the Gambia River from 22 July to 24 August 1695, where the French captured Fort James on what is now Kunta Kinteh Island from the English. Gennes loaded two vessels with the captured Africans he found in the English base and dispatched them to the French islands of the Antilles. This prize covered all the costs of the armament. Contrary winds forced the rest of the fleet back to Gorée on 5 September 1695. From there they sailed to the Cape Verde Islands, to Saint Anne Island on the coast of Brazil and then to Rio de Janeiro, which they reached on 2 December and left on 26 December 1695.

The fleet sailed down the coast of Patagonia in January 1696. They entered the Strait on 11 February 1696 and reached Port Galant, (Note: "Port Galant" refers to a bay on the northwest shore of the Strait of Magellan at 22.908333°S 43.196389°W) but were forced to return and reentered the Atlantic on 11 April 1696. Gennes blamed the captain of the Séditieux for the failure to reach the Pacific. Although expedition was unable to pass through to the Pacific due to the extreme cold and poor weather, it made a number of observations of the land and inhabitants of the region.

On 16 April 1696 the squadron was separated by fog. Gennes returned to Rio de Janeiro on 20 May. He rejoined the Soleil d'Afrique and Séditieux (26) on 18 July 1696 in Bahia. The squadron reached Cayenne on 31 August 1696, left the next month to cruise around Barbados, and visited Martinique, Saint Lucia and Guadeloupe. Gennes sailed from Guadeloupe on 11 February 1697. He returned to La Rochelle on 21 April 1697. Gennes was granted considerable pensions for himself and his family, was given a large grant of land named Oyac on the mainland of Cayenne, and was elevated by the king to become the count of Oyac.

== Governor of Saint-Christophe (1698–1702) ==
Islands in the Lesser Antilles

From 1668 to 1688 the French and English colonists on Saint Christopher Island (Saint Kitts) had been at peace. However, when the Nine Years' War (1688–97) broke out the governor general of the Antilles, Charles de Courbon de Blénac, decided that to ensure the safety of the French on the island he must expel the English. At the start of 1689 he attacked and defeated the English, and transported them to Jamaica, Barbados and other islands. The English returned to Saint Christopher with large forces in August 1690. After a month and a half the French were obliged to capitulate and cede the whole island to the English. The Treaty of Ryswick (1697) ended the Nine Years' War and returned the French part of the island. Before handing over in 1699 the English systematically destroyed the plantations and buildings, including four of the five churches. When the French regained control there were no functioning sugar plantations or boiling houses, and only 1,166 inhabitants. Gennes was given command of Saint Christophe in the absence of Commander Charles de Pechpeyrou-Comminges de Guitaut, nominal governor of the island and now second in command of the French Antilles.

Under Gennes the French began reconstruction, but the effort was wasted. During the War of the Spanish Succession (1701–1713) the English on Saint Christophe did not wait for confirmation of the start of war before starting to harass the French. They were aware of the weakness of the French colony and lack of support it could expect from other islands. Gennes knew the English were preparing to attack, but only had about 400 militia to oppose them, plus four companies of marine troops. He proposed that the English observe the old tradition of neutrality on the island, but the English led by Christopher Codrington as general of the English Leeward Islands disagreed. Codrington came to Saint Christopher from Antigua. He brought a regiment of regular troops from Antigua, combined with militia of Antigua and Nevis, for a total of almost 1,200 men. With their local forces the English had more than 2,100 men. On 15 July 1702 four English men of war and about twenty barques appeared off Nevis point and a French refugee arrived with a message from major general Sir Walter Hamilton that called on Gennes to cede the French part of Saint Christopher.

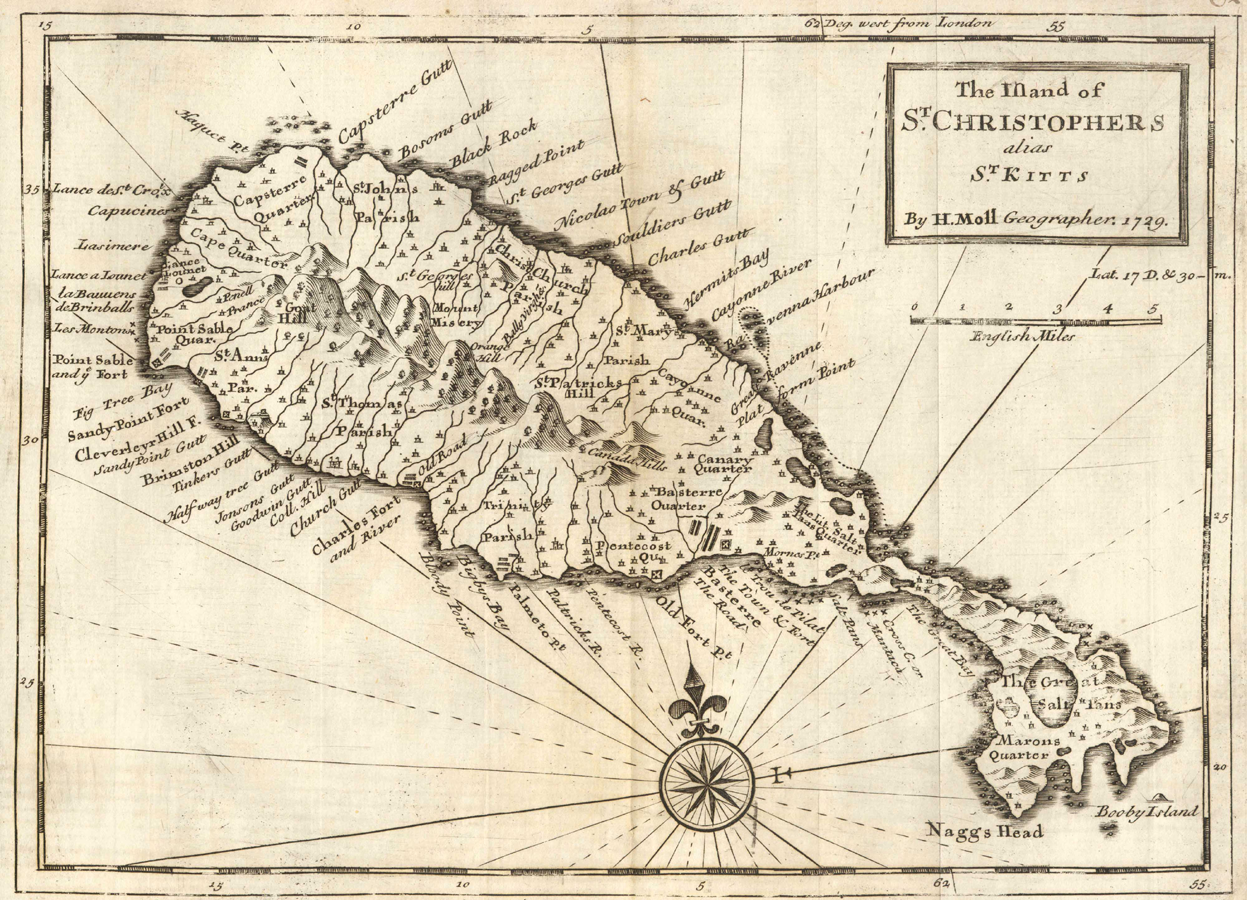
Saint Christophers Island in 1729. Before the capitulation the French held the southeast and northwest parts, and the English the center.

Gennes called a council of war in which 12 of the 17 members advised surrender. Gennes therefore composed and signed articles of capitulation and sent them to Major General Hamilton. The French forces were to be allowed to leave with drums beating, and the officers would keep their arms. The captains could take six slaves, the lieutenants four and the ensigns two. The members of the sovereign council of the island could each take six slaves, and the other inhabitants could each take one. The families of all the colonists and officers were to be taken to Martinique with their baggage. The Irish who had settled in the French part of the island were to be allowed to keep their arms and property. The capitulation was signed by both sides on 16 July 1702. Most of the colonists went to Martinique or Guadeloupe, although some were taken to Saint-Domingue (Haiti) .

== Last years (1705–05) ==
Gennes was held in Saint Christophe until the French evacuation was complete, then chartered a small boat to take him to his estate in Cayenne with the slaves the English had allowed him and some others he had bought. He was captured by a Dutch corsair and taken to Saint Thomas, Barbados. He was returned to Martinique around August 1703. The governor general Charles-François de Machault de Belmont seems to have been instructed by the court to prosecute the Comte de Gennes in such a way as not to besmirch his honour unless he was found guilty of excessive cowardice. When he reached Martinique Gennes was arrested and taken to Fort Saint Pierre, and a Major Coullet was told to start investigating his case and that of his lieutenants.

Everyone interviewed recalled that Saint Christophe had been considered indefensible, and that Commander Guitaut (now dead) and the intendant had planned to send boats to transport its inhabitants to other islands. However, the prosecution seems to have been directed to find a culprit. Gennes was tried in August 1704, found guilty of cowardice and condemned to be degraded from the nobility and stripped of all his title and positions. Gennes appealed the decision. A few days later the king's ship Thétis arrived at Fort Royal to transport Gennes to France. He was captured by the English and taken to Plymouth, England, where he died before he could defend himself in France. He died in 1705.

== Inventor ==
Gennes had great mathematical ability, was very interested in mechanics, and invented several interesting and useful machines. His inventions included cannons and mortars, fire arrows to burn the sails of ships and a clock without a spring or counterweight. He made a peacock of iron and ivory that swallowed food, and was said to digest it by fermentation and then show the results. (Note: The priest Jean-Baptiste Labat recorded a conversation he had with Christopher Codrington. "I noticed in their conversation how vain [the English] are, & the little esteem in which they hold other Nations, & above all the Irish. For when someone said that the French Colony was very weak, M. de Codrington instantly responded that it was up to M. de Gennes to augment it with Irishmen, if he couldn't do it with Frenchmen. I asked him to tell me the secret of this, so I could let M. de Gennes know it. Gladly, he said, do you know that M. de Gennes made a Peacock that walks, eats, digests. I answered that I did know it. Well, he continued, let him make five or six regiments of Irishmen. He will have far less trouble making these sorts of gross brutes than a Peacock.") In 1678 Gennes presented a weaving machine that did not require workers to the Académie Royale. The machine was a power loom, where the movement of a mill replaced all the normal movements of a human weaver.

== Legacy ==
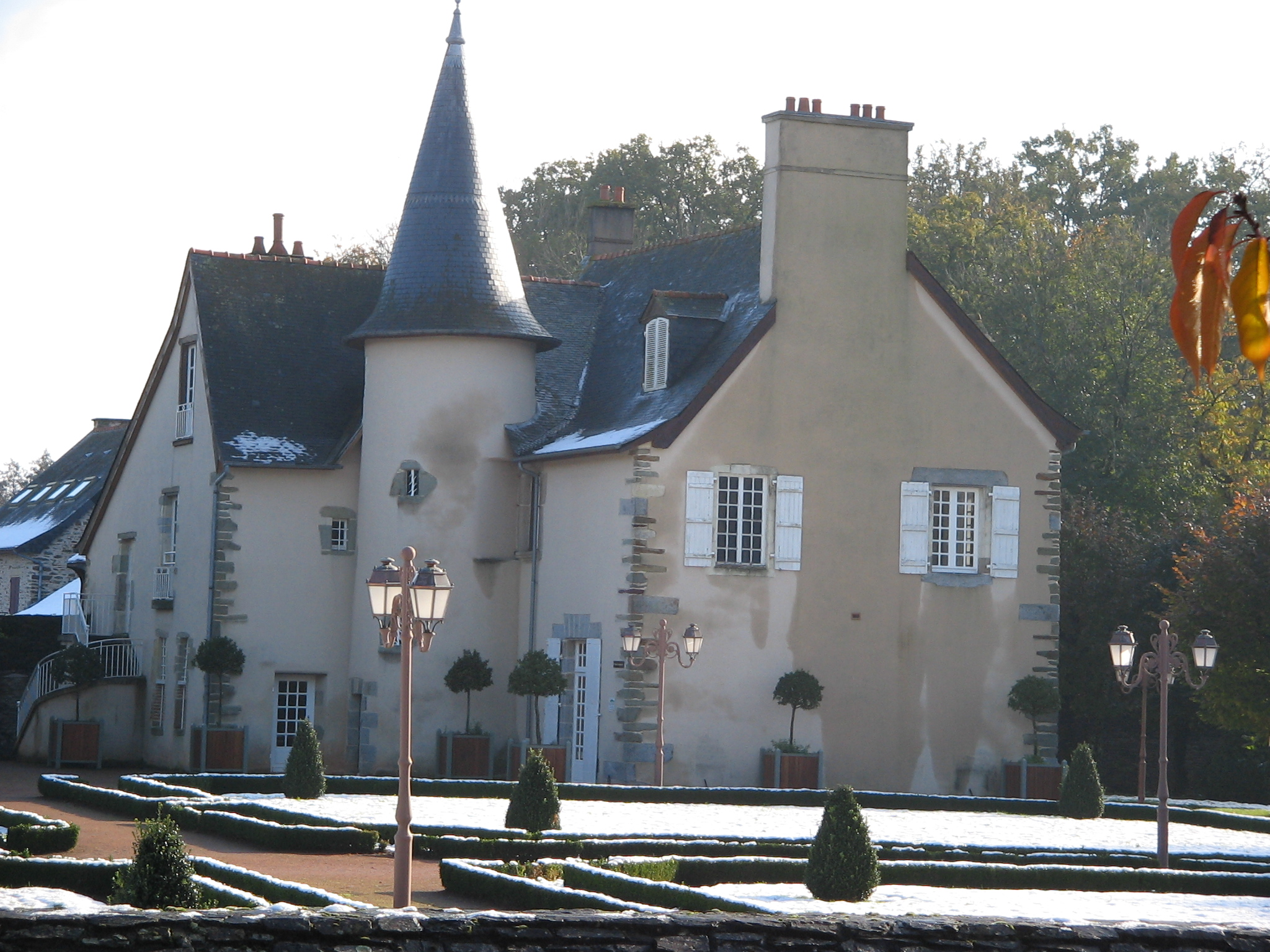
Manoir de Bourgchevreuil

The king treated the 1704 trial as if de Gennes had not been found guilty, and his titles were retained and a pension paid to his widow.

By an act of 12 June 1625 his son Jean de Gennes du Boisguy, a reformed Protestant, purchased the manor house and estate of Bourgchevreuil. He purchased several additional neighboring lands to enlarge the estate. On his death, after his son lost his fortune the estate became the property of his two daughters, Catherine and Marie. Around 1640 his daughter Catherine de Gennes (died 1680) married Jacques de Farcy, seigneur de la Ville du bois, sieur de Painel (died 1682). His daughter Marie de Gennes married Jacques' brother René de Farcy, seigneur de la Daguerie.

== Sources ==
- Académie des inscriptions et belles-lettres (1678), Le Journal des sçavans (in French), Paris: Jean Cusson
- Bahon, Denis, L'histoire du Manoir de Bourgchevreuil (in French), Cesson-Sévigné, archived from the original on 24 February 2018
- Bois, François-Alexandre Aubert de la Chesnaye des (1773), Dictionnaire de la noblesse, contenant les généalogies, l'histoire & la chronologie des familles nobles de la France... (in French), Chez la veuve Duchesne ... et l'auteur
- Brosses, Charles de (1756), Histoire des navigations aux Terres Australes... (in French), Chez Durand
- Dahlgren, Erik Wilhelm (1907), Voyages français à destination de la mer du sud avant Bougainville (1695–1749) (in French), Paris: Impr. nationale
- Dessalles, Adrien (1847b), Histoire politique et commerciale des Antilles ... traitant des evenements survenus aux Antilles, sous le regne de Louis XV. Extraits de ses lettres aux gouverneurs-generaux des iles et aux intendants (in French), vol. 2, France
- Labat, Jean-Baptiste (1724), Nouveau voyage aux isles de l'Amerique. Contenant l'histoire naturelle de ces pays, l'origine, les moers (etc.) (in French), Husson, Johnson
- Labat, Jean-Baptiste (1742), Memoires des nouveaux voyages faits aux isles francoises de l'Amérique, Paris: Ch. J.B. Delespine
- Marcillac, Sidney Daney de (1846), Histoire de la Martinique: depuis la colonisation jusqu'en 1815 (in French), E. Ruelle
- Pierfit, "Jean Baptiste, comte d'Oyac de GENNES", Geneanet (in French)
- Pritchard, James S. (22 January 2004), In Search of Empire: The French in the Americas, 1670–1730, Cambridge University Press, ISBN 978-0-521-82742-3
- Riskin, Jessica (10 March 2016), The Restless Clock: A History of the Centuries-Long Argument Over What Makes Living Things Tick, University of Chicago Press, ISBN 978-0-226-30292-8
