= Charles de Pechpeyrou-Comminges de Guitaut =

French army and naval officer

Charles de Pechpeyrou-Comminges, chevalier de Guitaut

Governor of Martinique
- In office 1687–1689
- Preceded by: Jacques de Chambly
- Succeeded by: Claude de Roux de Saint-Laurent (interim); Nicolas de Gabaret

Governor of Saint Christopher
- In office 1689 – August 1690
- Preceded by: Claude de Roux de Saint-Laurent
- Succeeded by: Jean-Baptiste de Gennes d'Oyac

Lieutenant general of the Antilles (1)
- In office 18 August 1691 – 5 February 1692
- Preceded by: François d'Alesso d'Éragny
- Succeeded by: Charles de Courbon de Blénac

Lieutenant general of the Antilles (2)
- In office 10 June 1696 – 14 March 1697
- Preceded by: Charles de Courbon de Blénac
- Succeeded by: Thomas-Claude Renart de Fuchsamberg

Lieutenant general of the Antilles (3)
- In office 17 August 1700 – 23 May 1701
- Preceded by: Thomas-Claude Renart de Fuchsamberg
- Succeeded by: Charles des Nos

Lieutenant general of the Antilles (4)
- In office 6 October 1701 – 7 September 1702
- Preceded by: Charles des Nos
- Succeeded by: Gabriel Jean Nicolas de Gabaret (acting); Marc Hyacinthe de Rosmadec

Personal details
- Died: 7 September 1702 Martinique, Kingdom of France
- Occupation: Soldier, naval officer

Charles de Pechpeyrou-Comminges, chevalier de Guitaut (or Guitaud; died 7 September 1702) was a French army and naval officer who became governor of Martinique and then of Saint Christophe. He was three times acting lieutenant-general of the French Antilles.

== Family ==
Charles de Pechpeyrou-Comminges, chevalier de Guitaut, was the son of Louis de Pechpeyrou-Comminges, seigneur de Guitaut and of Jeanne d'Eygua, daughter of Bertrand d'Eygua, seigneur de Castel-Arnaud. His parents married on 7 September 1625 and had five children: Guillaume; Charles, a soldier who died in the civil wars; a second Charles, the subject of this article; a third Charles; and Bertrand, abbé de Saint-Michel de Pessan. His oldest brother, Guillaume de Pechpeyrou-Comminges, comte de Guitaut^{(fr)} (1626–1685), had a prominent military career during and after the Fronde rebellion.

== Career ==
Guitaut became a knight of the Order of Malta, commander of Palières, governor of Châtillon-sur-Seine and grand-bailli of Auxois^{(fr)}. He then served in the navy. He was local governor of Martinique from 1687 to 1689, replacing Jacques de Chambly.

=== Governor of Saint Christopher (1689–70) ===
From 1668 to 1688 the French and English colonists on Saint Christopher Island (Saint Kitts) had been at peace. However, when war broke out between the two countries in 1688 the governor general of the Antilles, Charles de Courbon de Blénac, decided that to ensure the safety of the French on the island he must expel the English. He came to Saint Christopher at the start of 1689 with naval troops, local forces from Martinique and Guadeloupe and buccaneers, who joined the local militia. He attacked the English energetically and drove them back to Fort Charles, which he besieged and took, then transported the English to Jamaica, Barbados and other islands.

In July 1689 the king made Guitaut governor of Saint Christopher Island and gave him the position of lieutenant general to the government of the American islands, which had been vacated by the death of Claude de Roux de Saint-Laurent. (Note: The head of government in the French Antilles was Gouverneur, Lieutenant-général des îles françaises d'Amerique. He was supported in military matters by commandeur Guitant, Lieutenant-général au gouvernement des îles, sometimes given as Lieutenant au gouvernement-général des îles, and in civil matters by the intendant. Martinique also had a local governor, or Gouverneur particulier.) On 16 June 1689 Louis XIV made Nicolas de Gabaret, governor of Grenada, the governor of Martinique in place of Guitant.

At the start of 1690 the English attempted to take Saint Martin. Blenac had ordered Guitaut to move the inhabitants to Saint Christopher, but he took several companies of militia and naval troops to Saint Martin, where he defeated the English before returning to Saint Christopher. The English returned with a large fleet carrying strong forces from Europe and the militias of their local islands, and attacked Saint Christopher in August 1690, landing at the Salines point without opposition. Guitaut had to retire to the trenches that protected the petite Saline and those round the town of Basseterre. After the sieur de Guarigue was wounded the defenders became demoralized. He and Guitaut retreated to Fort Charles where they were soon besieged by the English. They were unable to silence the battery of la Souphrière, which overlooked the whole fort. After a month and a half Guitaut was obliged to capitulate and cede the island to the English.

=== Lieutenant-général au gouvernement (1690–1702) ===
As lieutenant to the governor general, until his death in 1702 Guitant was acting governor-general four times between the death of the incumbent and arrival of his replacement. Blénac left Martinique on 29 January 1690 and returned to France to defend himself at court. By July the British had reconquered Saint Kitts and Sint Eustatius. Blénac's successor François d'Alesso, Marquis d'Éragny arrived on 5 February 1691 with 14 warships, strengthened the defenses and in May relieved the French defenders of Fort Saint-Charles in Guadeloupe, who had been besieged by the English.

The marquis d'Eragny, died on 18 August 1690. Commandeur Guitaud was interim lieutenant general and commander in chief from 18 August 1691. Charles de Courbon de Blénac was again named lieutenant general on 1 November 1691 and was received in Martinique on 5 February 1692. He died on 10 June 1696. Guitaud was again made interim lieutenant governor on 10 June 1696. Thomas-Claude Renart de Fuchsamberg, marquis d'Amblimont was named governor and lieutenant general on 1 September 1696 and received in Martinique on 14 March 1697. He died of yellow fever in Martinique on 17 August 1700.

Guitaud was made interim lieutenant general for the third time on 17 August 1700. The comte Charles Desnotz (or des Nots, d'Esnots) was named governor and lieutenant general on 1 January 1701 and was received in Martinique on 23 May 1701. He died of yellow fever in Martinique on 6 October 1701 and Guitaud was made interim lieutenant general for the fourth time. On 4 January 1702 Marc-Hyacinthe, marquis de Rosmadec was named to replace Desnotz, but he died on his ship in Havana before taking office. On 1 July 1702 Charles-François de Machault de Bellemont was named governor and lieutenant general. On 4 September 1702 Guitant and the intendant Robert (Note: François-Roger Robert was named intendant on 1 January 1695, received at Martinique on 2 January 1696, and replaced by M. Mithon as acting intendant on 1 October 1702.) issued ordinances defining compensation for wounds to whites and slaves in the war that had just started with England. Only those laborers and other whites who had nothing to lose would be compensated. Depending on the merit of their action, a slave could even be given their liberty.

Guitaud died in Martinique on 7 September 1702, two months after the start of hostilities in the War of the Spanish Succession. He was a Knight Commander of the Order of Malta. He was replaced by Nicolas de Gabaret, Governor of Grenada, as interim governor general pending the arrival of Machault. Machault was received in Martinique on 4 March 1703. Gabaret was given Guitaut's position of lieutenant au gouvernement général under Machault.

== Sources ==
- Cahoon, Ben, "Martinique", Worldstatesmen.org
- Dangeau, Marquis de (1854), Journal du marquis de Dangeau publié en entier pour la première fois par mm. Soulié ... [et al.]: 1687-1689 (in French), F. Didot freres
- Dessalles, Adrien (1847b), Histoire politique et commerciale des Antilles ... traitant des evenements survenus aux Antilles, sous le regne de Louis XV. Extraits de ses lettres aux gouverneurs-generaux des iles et aux intendants (in French), vol. 2, France
- Dessalles, Pierre Régis (1847c), Histoire legislative des Antilles ou Annales du conseil souverain de la Martinique (etc.) (in French), vol. 3, France
- Labat, Jean-Baptiste (1724), Nouveau voyage aux isles de l'Amerique. Contenant l'histoire naturelle de ces pays, l'origine, les moers (etc.) (in French), Husson, Johnson
- Lainé, P. Louis (1843), Archives généalogiques et historiques de la Noblesse de France; (in French), vol. 11, Chez l'auteur
- Marcillac, Sidney Daney de (1846), Histoire de la Martinique: depuis la colonisation jusqu'en 1815 (in French), E. Ruelle
- Marley, David (2005), Historic Cities of the Americas: An Illustrated Encyclopedia, ABC-CLIO, ISBN 978-1-57607-027-7
- Marley, David (2010), Pirates of the Americas, ABC-CLIO, ISBN 978-1-59884-201-2
- Pritchard, Pritchard, James S. (2004-01-22), In Search of Empire: The French in the Americas, 1670-1730, Cambridge University Press, ISBN 978-0-521-82742-3
- Saint-Méry, Médéric Louis Élie Moreau de (1784), Loix et constitutions des colonies françoises de l'Amerique sous le vent... (in French), L'Auteur
