= Jacques de Chambly =

Governor of Acadia

Governor of Acadia
- In office 1673–1677
- Preceded by: Hector d'Andigné de Grandfontaine
- Succeeded by: John Rhoades

Governor of Grenada
- In office 1679–1680
- Preceded by: Pierre de Sainte-Marthe de Lalande
- Succeeded by: Nicolas de Gabaret

Governor of Martinique
- In office 1680–1687
- Preceded by: Antoine André de Sainte-Marthe
- Succeeded by: Charles de Peychpeyrou-Comminges de Guitaut

Personal details
- Born: 1612 Chamouille, Kingdom of France
- Died: 1687 (aged 74–75) Martinique, Kingdom of France
- Occupation: Soldier

Jacques de Chambly (born 1612, died 1687) was from a French military background and became a seigneur in the New World and a governor of Acadia.

Chambly arrived in New France in 1665 when he was a captain in the Carignan-Salières Regiment. He immediately was in charge of the construction of Fort Saint-Louis (now known as Fort Chambly) on the Richelieu Rapids. He then took part in the Prouville de Tracy’s expedition against the Iroquois. When his regiment was disbanded he returned to France but returned to service in Canada in 1670.

In 1672 he received a seigneury on the Richelieu River in present-day Quebec, Canada. In 1673 he was appointed governor of Acadia, replacing Hector d'Andigné de Grandfontaine at the capital of Acadia, Fort Pentagouet.

Chambly died in Martinique in 1687.
