= List of governors general of the French Antilles =

Governor general of the French Antilles
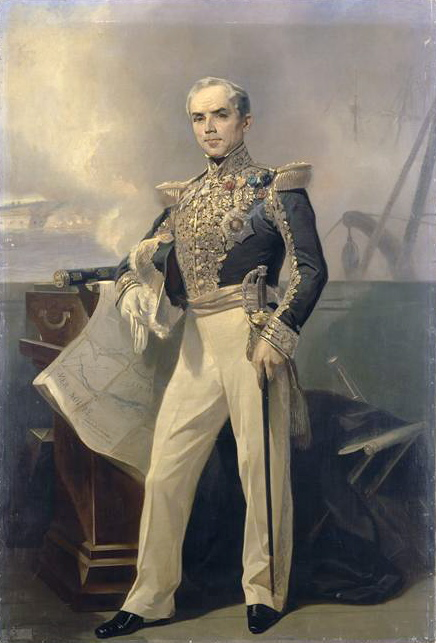
- Armand Joseph Bruat, governor general of the Windward Islands (1849–1851)
- Ministry of the Navy and Colonies
- Seat: Basseterre, Saint-Christophe (1628–71); Saint-Pierre, Martinique (1671–74); Fort-Royal, Martinique
- Formation: 1628 (1st time); March 1849 (second time)
- First holder: Pierre Belain d'Esnambuc
- Final holder: Auguste Napolèon Vaillant
- Abolished: 23 March 1794 (1st time); November 1851 (2nd time)

The governors general of the French Antilles, or lieutenants-general, were the king's representatives in the French West Indies colonies under the Ancien Régime. The colonies were, by date of foundation, Saint-Christophe (1625), Saint-Domingue (1627), Saint Martin (1635), Martinique (1635), Guadeloupe (1635), Dominica (1635), Saint Barthélemy (1648), Grenada (1650), Saint Croix (1650), Saint Lucia (1660), Tobago (1678), the Grenadines and Saint Vincent (1699).

== History ==
Islands in the Lesser Antilles

The position was created in 1628, formally named the "Governor-general of the islands and mainland of America" (Gouverneur général des Isles et Terre Ferme de l'Amérique). The first office holder was Pierre Belain d'Esnambuc, who had founded the colony of Saint Christophe (Saint Kitts) in 1625, the first French colony in the region. The governor general lived in Basseterre Saint Christophe. Jean-Charles de Baas moved the governor's residence from Saint-Christophe to Martinique, first to Saint-Pierre in 1671, then to Fort-Royal in 1674.

The position was split in 1714. The colony of Saint-Domingue (Haiti) in the Greater Antilles was assigned to the Governor General of Saint-Domingue, while the islands of the Lesser Antilles from Guadeloupe to Tobago were assigned to the Governor General of the Windward Islands (Gouverneur général des Isles du Vent). The position was suppressed on 23 March 1794 after the occupation of the French colonies by the British. During the French Second Republic the position was restored in March 1849, but definitively removed in November 1851.

== Functions ==
The governor-general of the islands and mainland of America was the representative of the King of France in the French West Indies. The position of governor general was generally entrusted to members of the nobility of the Kingdom of France, except under the Second Republic. His main functions were administrative and military. He enforced laws and customs.

Beside the governor general, during certain periods the king appointed local governors (gouverneurs particuliers) to administer each of the main islands or groups of islands. The English occupations, first of Guadeloupe in 1759, then of Martinique in 1762, marked a change in the administration of the Windward Islands. Each of the main islands was given an administrative authority. The English rule was preserved during the return of these islands to France after the Treaty of Paris (1763) and the main Windward Islands each hosted a local governor. The governor general (or lieutenant-general) of the Windward Islands was the superior of the local governors of each territory. Sometimes one person combined the two functions.

Along with lieutenant-generals and local governors, the royal power soon installed intendents with jurisdiction over justice, police, and especially finance. The intendants had the civil power, while the lieutenants-general had military power. The residence of the intendant general was always in Martinique.

== Governors general ==
=== Gouverneurs généraux des Isles et Terre Ferme de l'Amérique (1626–1714) ===
Appointed	Took office	Left office	Name	Notes
31 October 1626	8 May 1627	December 1636	Pierre Belain d'Esnambuc	Governor of Saint Christophe. Died in office
December 1636	December 1636	1638	Pierre du Halde	Governor of Saint Christophe. Interim from December 1636. Confirmed in March 1637
25 February 1638	11 February 1639	22 August 1645	Phillippe de Longvilliers de Poincy	First governor-general. Appointment last renewed in January 1642
20 February 1645	22 August 1645	17 January 1647	Noël Patrocles de Thoisy	Arrested by de Poincy 17 January 1647 and sent back to France
25 February 1645	25 February 1645	1651	Phillippe de Longvilliers de Poincy	Reestablished by order of the local Council of State
	1651	1663	(vacant)	The Islands were sold in 1651. Poincy retained Saint Christopher. Enambuc's nephew Jacques Dyel du Parquet bought Martinique, Grenada and Saint Lucia.
19 November 1663	7 June 1664	April 1665	Alexandre de Prouville de Tracy	Royal appointment
	February 1665	October 1666	Anne de Chambré	Interim (Note: On 18 June 1667 the sieur de Chambré, intendant of the king's troops in the Antilles and general agent of the compagnie des Indes Occidentales, contributed greatly to the defense of Saint Christopher Island when it was attacked by the English.)
26 February 1666	7 October 1666	4 February 1669	Antoine Lefèbvre de La Barre	By appointment of the French West India Company
1 January 1668	4 February 1669	15 January 1677	Jean-Charles de Baas	Died in office 15 January 1677
	1677	1677	Gabriel de Jolinet	Interim.
13 May 1677	8 November 1677	29 January 1690	Charles de Courbon de Blénac	Claude de Roux de Saint-Laurent acting March 1683 - June 1684.
1 May 1690	5 February 1691	18 August 1691	François d'Alesso d'Éragny	Died in office 18 August 1691
18 August 1691	18 August 1691	November 1691	Charles de Pechpeyrou-Comminges de Guitaut	Interim (1)
1 November 1691	5 February 1692	10 June 1696	Charles de Courbon de Blénac	Re-appointed. Died in office 10 June 1696.
10 June 1696	10 June 1696	14 March 1697	Charles de Pechpeyrou-Comminges de Guitaut	Interim (2)
1 September 1696	14 March 1697	17 August 1700	Thomas-Claude Renart de Fuchsamberg d'Amblimont	Died in office 17 August 1700.
17 August 1700	17 August 1700	23 May 1701	Charles de Pechpeyrou-Comminges de Guitaut	Interim (3)
1 January 1701	23 May 1701	6 October 1701	Charles Desnotz	Died in office 6 October 1701.
6 October 1701	6 October 1701	7 September 1702	Charles de Pechpeyrou-Comminges de Guitaut	Interim (4) Died 7 September 1702.
4 January 1702			Marc Hyacinthe de Rosmadec	Died in Havana before taking office.
17 September 1702	17 September 1702	4 March 1703	Nicolas de Gabaret	Interim (1)
1 July 1702	4 March 1703	1709	Charles-François de Machault de Belmont	Died in 1709.
	7 January 1709	1710	Nicolas de Gabaret	Interim (2)
	1710	October 1713	Raymond Balthazar Phélypeaux	Died in 1713.
	6 November 1713	1715	Robert Cloche de La Malmaison	Interim.

=== Gouverneurs généraux des Isles du Vent (1714–1794) ===
Start	End	Name	Notes
1 January 1714	1717	Abraham Duquesne-Guitton	
7 January 1717	23 May 1717	Antoine d'Arcy de la Varenne	Interim. Arrested and sent back to France
1717	1727	François de Pas de Mazencourt	Designated by the regent
1728	1745	Jacques-Charles Bochard de Champigny (1673 – 20 May 1754)	
1744	1750	Charles de Tubières de Caylus (1698–1750)	
1750	1757	Maximin de Bompart (1698–1773)	
1757	1761	François V de Beauharnais (1714–1800)	
1761	1762	Louis-Charles Le Vassor de La Touche (1710–1781)	
1763	1768	No governors general from 1763 to 1768	
1768	May 1777	Robert, comte d'Argout (d. 1780)	
July 1777	April 1783	François Claude Amour, marquis de Bouillé (1739–1800)	
December 1783	July 1789	Claude-Charles de Damas de Marillac	
July 1789	April 1790	Charles du Houx de Vioménil	Interim
March 1791	December 1792	Jean-Pierre-Antoine de Béhague (1727–1813)	
December 1792	23 March 1794	Donatien-Marie-Joseph de Rochambeau (1755–1813)	

=== Gouverneurs généraux des Îles du Vent (1849–1851) ===
Start	End	Name
March 1849	April 1851	Armand Joseph Bruat (1796–1855)
April 1851	November 1851	Auguste Napoléon Vaillant

== See also ==
- List of colonial governors and administrators of Saint Christopher (1625–1702)
- List of colonial and departmental heads of Guadeloupe (1635–1943)
- List of colonial and departmental heads of Martinique (1635–1947)
- List of colonial governors of Saint-Domingue (1640–1798)
- List of colonial governors and administrators of Grenada (1649–1763)

== Sources ==
- Annuaire de la Martinique, Page XXXIII à LXXXV -Imprimerie du Gouvernement – Année commune 1893 –
- Cahoon, Ben, "Martinique", worldstatesmen.org
- Gazette de France 1631-1735 (in French), 1766
- Saint-Méry, Médéric Louis Élie Moreau de (1784), Loix et constitutions des colonies françoises de l'Amerique sous le vent... (in French), L'Auteur
