= Claude de Roux de Saint-Laurent =

French soldier

Claude de Roux, chevalier de Saint-Laurent

Governor of Saint Christophe
- In office April 1666 – February 1689
- Preceded by: Charles de Sales
- Succeeded by: Charles de Pechpeyrou-Comminges de Guitaut

Governor general of the French Antilles (acting)
- In office March 1683 – June 1684
- Preceded by: Charles de Courbon de Blénac
- Succeeded by: Charles de Courbon de Blénac

Governor of Martinique (interim)
- In office February 1689 – 31 March 1689
- Preceded by: Charles de Pechpeyrou-Comminges de Guitaut
- Succeeded by: Nicolas de Gabaret

Personal details
- Died: March 1689 Martinique
- Occupation: Colonial administrator

Claude de Roux, chevalier de Saint-Laurent (or Saint-Laurens; died March 1689) was a French soldier, a chevalier of the Knights Hospitaller, who was governor of the colony of Saint Christophe on Saint Christopher Island from 1666 to 1689. He took office in the Second Anglo-Dutch War (1665–67), when the French expelled the English from the island, and left office early in the Nine Years' War (1688–97), when the English expelled the French from the island.

== Family ==
Claude de Roux de Saint-Laurent was the son of François Roux, seigneur de Saint Laurent and Lucréce, daughter of Balthazar Bruin de Castellane. His brother Joseph was received as a chevalier of the Order of Saint John of Jerusalem in 1633.

== Chevalier of Saint John (1641–66) ==
Saint-Laurent was received as a chevalier of the Order of Saint John of Jerusalem (Hospitallers) in 1641. In 1651 the Compagnie des Îles de l'Amérique went bankrupt and Phillippe de Longvilliers de Poincy persuaded Jean-Paul Lascaris-Castellar, the grand master of the Order of Saint John of Jerusalem, to buy the French part of Saint-Christophe and the smaller islands of Saint Barthélemy, Saint Martin and Saint Croix for 120,000 écus. King Louis XIV remained sovereign of the islands, and Poincy was confirmed as governor of Saint Christophe. After Poincy died in 1660 the order, which had still not paid all the purchase money, appointed Charles de Sales the new governor. He was the nephew of Saint Francis de Sales. Jean-Baptiste Colbert put pressure on the Hospitallers to cede the islands back to the crown.

The Hospitallers ceded the islands to France in 1665, when Saint-Laurent was lieutenant governor, passing ownership to the new French West India Company. The Second Anglo-Dutch War began that year, and France joined on the side of the Netherlands in 1666. The French and English had shared Saint Christopher until then. Fighting began on 21 April 1666 (Gregorian calendar), and the French routed the numerically superior English forces two days later. Charles de Sales was killed during the fighting, as was the English governor William Watts. Saint-Laurent received the English capitulation. He became governor of the whole island. However, in the absence of a formal royal commission the officers of the king's forces refused to accept his command.

== Governor of Saint Christophe ==
=== Expulsion of the English (1666) ===
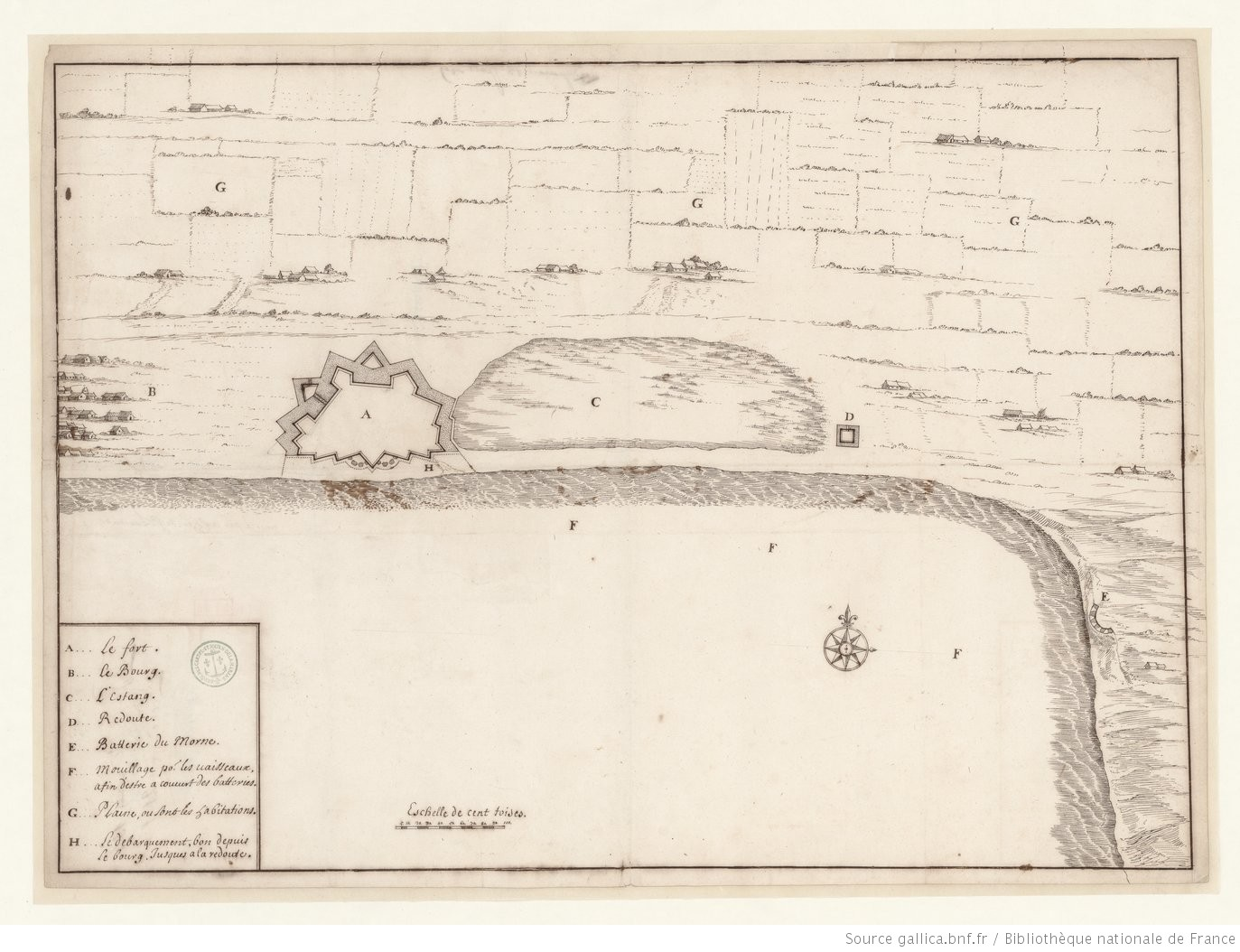
Fort of Saint Christophe and vicinity (Basseterre) sent by Saint-Laurent

Saint-Laurent gave the English settlers the choice of selling up and leaving the island with their slaves and personal effects or becoming subjects of the King of France. Those who stayed would not be allowed to practice their Protestant religion in public. A number chose to stay, and it took some time for the others to dispose of their property. Saint-Laurent saw these English settlers as a threat, since he expected an attempt to retake the island. He obtained reinforcements from Martinique and Guadeloupe to oppose any attempt. Civilians who were hostile to the French were deported to Nevis and Montserrat, or to other English islands or mainland colonies. 500 to 600 English "vagabonds" were expelled first, then 800 Irish, and then property owners. In all 8,000 English left the island, suffering considerable losses. Four of the Protestant churches were seized, dismantled and the beams removed.

=== Capture of Montserrat (1667) ===
On 17 January 1667 Lieutenant General Antoine Lefèbvre de La Barre arrived in Saint Christophe after having examined all the coasts of Montserrat with a view to invasion. Saint Laurent received his commission as governor of Saint Christophe, signed by the king. All the royal troops stationed on Saint Christophe and 500 militia embarked on 25 ships of barques. La Barre had overall command, and Saint-Laurent consented to serve under Saint-Léon who commanded the land forces. The fleet sailed on 29 January 1667.

On 4 February 1667 the fleet arrived at Montserrat. La Barre learned that the garrison of Governor Roger Osborne included many Irish Catholics of dubious loyalty, and decided to land a few days later. His land force included 500 militiamen from Saint Christophe under Saint-Laurent and 500 regular troops of the Navarre and Normandie regiments led by Marshall Saint Léon. The force advanced inland in search of the English force, which they could not find, but they did capture Osborne's wife and other civilians, forcing the governor to sue for peace. The French took large quantities of armaments, slaves, horses and cattle. 2,000 Irish residents of Montserrat agreed to become subjects of France under the Sieur de Praille as interim governor.

=== English blockade (1667) ===
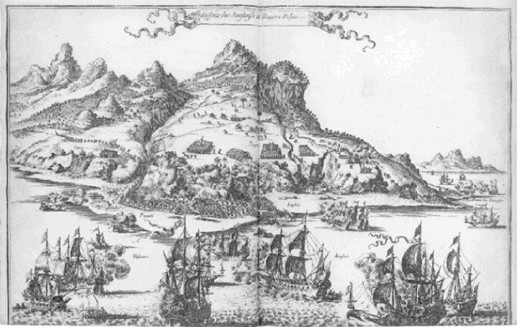
English attempt to retake Saint Christophe in 1667

An English squadron commanded by Sir John Berry entered the Caribbean and blockaded Saint Christophe. The English fleet arrived off the Nevis point on 4 April 1667. The English stayed out of range of the cannons of the fortifications, but kept frigates off the harbour of Saint Christophe to prevent any French ships entering. Saint-Laurent wrote to inform La Barre of the dangerous situation on the island and the risk of famine. In an effort to relieve the blockade La Barre and the governor of Martinique, Robert de Clodoré combined their forces with the Dutch commander Abraham Crijnssen. The Franco-Dutch fleet sailed for Nevis, and engaged the English in the Battle of Nevis (20 May 1667). La Barre caused a retreat through his incompetence, and Crijnssen left for Virginia in disgust.

A larger English fleet arrived under Sir John Harman, which destroyed La Barre's fleet and established English supremacy. An English invasion force under Henry Willoughby of 14 warships and 15 or 16 barques carrying soldiers reached Saint Christophe on 17 June 1667. The force disembarked at Pointe-des-Palmistes the next day. After the troops under Saint-Laurent put up a strong resistance, Willoughby chose to withdraw to Nevis. Eight flags had been captured from the English. Saint-Laurent sent his nephew to France to report to the king.

=== Return to peace (1668–88) ===
With the Treaty of Breda of 31 July 1667 (Gregorian calendar) the status quo ante was restored. The English settlers returned to find that the French had devastated their estates on the island. From 1668 to 1688 the French and English colonists on Saint Christopher Island (Saint Kitts) were at peace. From March 1683 until June 1684 Saint-Laurent was acting governor general of the French Antilles during the absence of Charles de Courbon de Blénac.

=== Renewed war (1688–89) ===
When war broke out between England and France in 1688 the governor general of the Antilles, Blénac, decided that to ensure the safety of the French on the island he must expel the English. He came to Saint Christopher at the start of 1689 with naval troops, local forces from Martinique and Guadeloupe and buccaneers, who joined the local militia. He attacked the English energetically and drove them back to Fort Charles, which he besieged and took, then transported the English to Jamaica, Barbados and other islands. Saint-Laurent was replaced as governor of Saint Christophe by Charles de Pechpeyrou-Comminges de Guitaut. From February 1689 until his death on 31 March 1689 Saint-Laurent was interim governor of Martinique.

== Sources ==
- Boucher, Philip P. (2008-01-15), France and the American Tropics to 1700: Tropics of Discontent?, JHU Press, ISBN 978-0-8018-8725-3
- Cahoon, Ben, "Saint Kitts and Nevis", Worldstatesmen.org
- Cahoon (b), Ben, "Martinique", Worldstatesmen.org
- Dessalles, Adrien; Dessalles, Pierre Régis (1847), Histoire générale des Antilles ... (in French), Libraire-éditeur
- Goslinga, Cornelis C. (2012-12-06), A Short History of the Netherlands Antilles and Surinam, Springer Science & Business Media, ISBN 978-94-009-9289-4
- Labat, Jean-Baptiste (1724), Nouveau voyage aux isles de l'Amerique. Contenant l'histoire naturelle de ces pays, l'origine, les moers (etc.) (in French), Husson, Johnson
- La Roque, Robert. (2000), "Le Febvre de la Barre, Joseph-Antoine", Dictionary of Canadian Biography, vol. 1
- Les Ordres Militaires du Moyen Age (in French), OSMCS Commanderie des Chevaliers d'Artois
- Lockerby, W. Earle (March 2008), "Le serment d'allégeance, le service militaire, les déportations et les Acadiens : opinions de France et de Québec aux 17e et 18e siècles", Acadiensis (in French), ISSN 1712-7432
- Marley, David (2008), Wars of the Americas: A Chronology of Armed Conflict in the Western Hemisphere, 1492 to the Present, ABC-CLIO, ISBN 978-1-59884-100-8
- Pithon-Curt, Jean Antoine (1750), Histoire de la noblesse du Comté-Venaissin, d'Avignon, et de la principauté d'Orange, dressée sur les preuves. Dediée au Roy (in French), vol. 4, chez la veuve De Lormel & Fils, imprimeur de l'Academie Royale de Musique, ruë du Foin, vis-àvis les Mathurins, à l'Enseigne Sainte Génevieve
- Vertot, Abbé de (1830), Histoire des chevaliers hospitaliers de Saint-Jean de Jérusalem: appelés depuis chevaliers de Rhodes, et aujourd'hui chevaliers de Malte (in French), Lequien fils
