= Thomas-Claude Renart de Fuchsamberg Amblimont =

French Navy officer and colonial administrator

Thomas Claude Bernard Renart de Fuchsamberg, marquis d'Amblimont
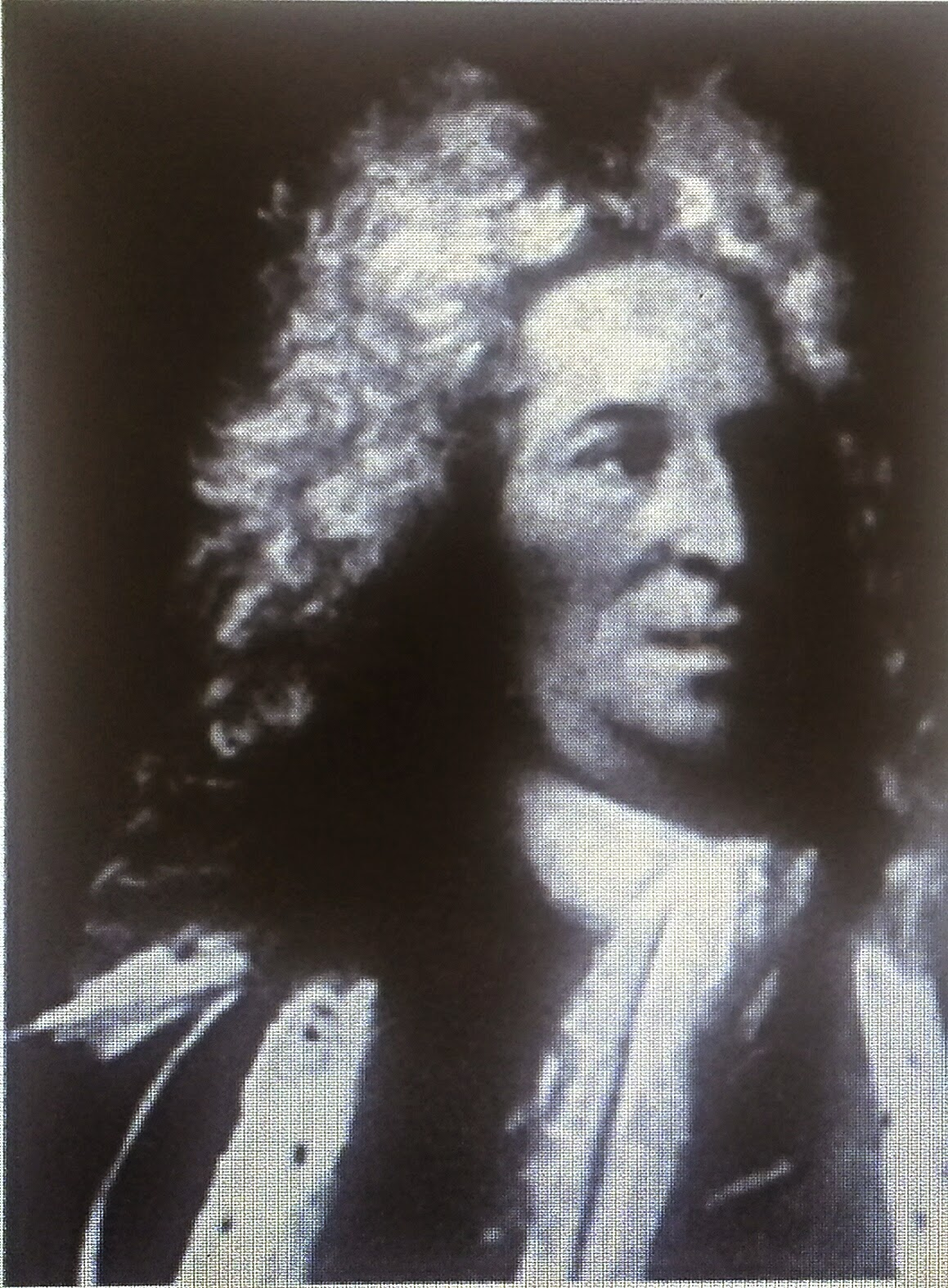

Governor general of the French Antilles
- In office 14 March 1697 – 17 August 1700
- Preceded by: Charles de Courbon de Blénac; Charles de Pechpeyrou-Comminges de Guitaut (acting)
- Succeeded by: Charles de Pechpeyrou-Comminges de Guitaut (acting); Charles Desnotz

Personal details
- Born: 1642
- Died: 17 August 1700 (aged 57–58) Martinique

Military service
- Allegiance: Kingdom of France
- Branch/service: France Army; French Navy
- Years of service: 1656–1663; 1663–1700
- Rank: Chef d'escadre
- Battles/wars: Cretan War; Anglo-Dutch Wars; Franco-Dutch War: Invasion of Martinique; Nine Years' War

Thomas Claude Bernard Renart de Fuchsamberg, marquis d'Amblimont (1642 – 17 August 1700) was a French Navy officer, nobleman and colonial administrator who served as governor general of the French Antilles. He is best known for his 1674 defense of Martinique against Dutch forces under Admiral Michiel de Ruyter, where he was captain of a warship that played a critical role in driving the Dutch land forces off their beachhead.

== Early years (1642–74) ==
Thomas Claude Renart de Fuchsamberg was born on 21 March 1642 in Mouzon, Province of Champagne. He came from a Saxon family that had settled in Mouzon. His father was Nicolas Renart, sieur des Mahomets. His mother, born Marin, was dame d'Amblimont. His father died in the siege of Mouzon in 1653. When his older brother died in the Battle of Valenciennes (1656) he inherited the seigneury of Amblimont, (Note: Amblimont is in the Ardennes near Mouzon. The two communes were merged into "Mouzon commune nouvelle" in 2015.) near Mouzon.

Amblimont obtained a position as captain in the regiment of Jean-Armand de Joyeuse, Marquis de Grandpré. He joined that regiment on 20 September 1656. In November 1663 Amblimont transferred to the navy as lieutenant de vaisseau. In 1669 he was capitaine de vaisseau in Rochefort, Charente-Maritime. That year he participated in the Cretan War as aide-de-camp of Almeiras.

== Defense of Martinique (1674) ==
The Third Anglo-Dutch War was launched by the English and French in 1672, but the allies were outmatched by the Dutch forces under Admiral Michiel de Ruyter, who inflicted several defeats. After the English had withdrawn from their alliance with France, de Ruyter appeared off Martinique on 16 July 1674 with a fleet that included 18 warships, support vessels and 15 troop transports with 3,400 soldiers. The French were expecting de Ruyter but thought Fort Royal (now Fort-de-France) was impregnable, so had concentrated their forces up the coast at Saint-Pierre. De Ruyter directed his force to Fort Royal, but was becalmed on the first day, giving the French time for urgent efforts to improve the defenses.

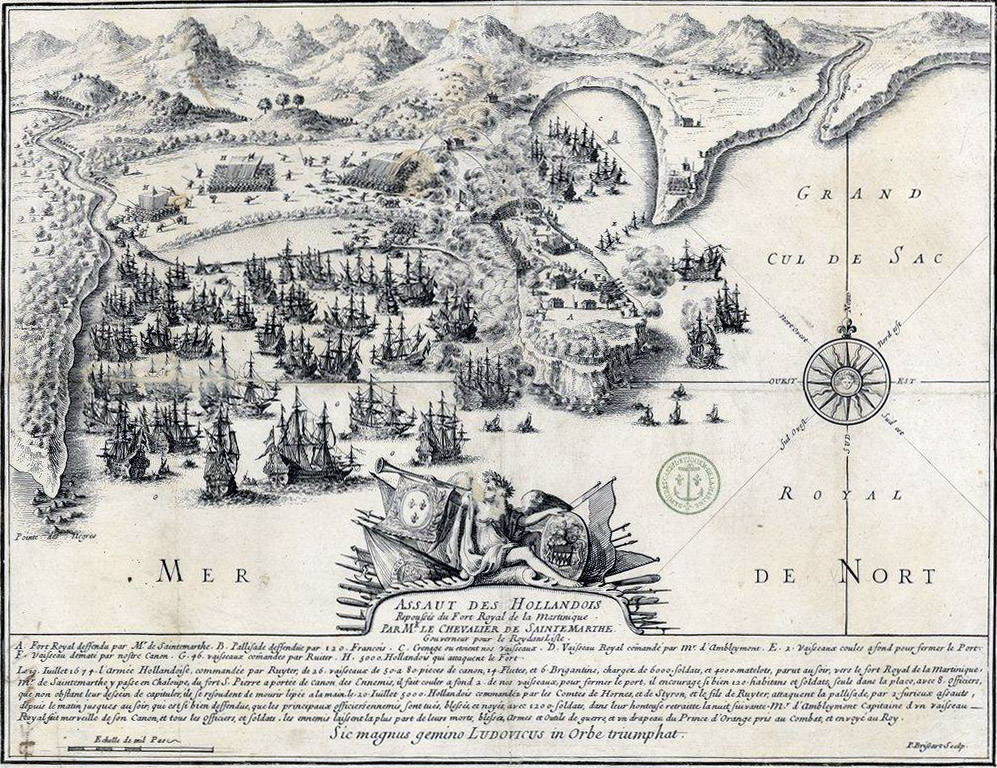
Dutch assault on Fort-Royal, 1674

The governor of Martinique Antoine André de Sainte-Marthe arrived to take command at dawn, by which time the French had booms across the harbour mouth and enough men to work the batteries. Two armed ship were anchored off the fort: the 44-gun royal frigate Jeux under Amblimont and the 22-gun merchantman Saint Eustache. At the start of the attempted Invasion of Martinique de Ruyter's force was greeted by heavy gunfire when it entered the harbour in the morning on 20 July. 1,000 Dutch troops were landed at 9:00 a.m. but found themselves trapped below high cliffs, exposed to fire from the French batteries and from the two armed ships. They broke into a rum warehouse and all discipline was lost.

The commanders of the Dutch land forces tried to take shelter below a cliff, but Amblimont at once landed six guns from the Jeux and opened fire on the new position. Dutch morale collapsed when their commander Van Uyttenhowe was badly wounded. The Dutch troops escaped by boat around 1:00 a.m., made a second assault at 2:00 p.m., and again were forced to retreat. The Dutch had lost 143 dead and 318 wounded against 15 French dead. They abandoned the effort, sailed north that night, and eventually returned to Europe in disarray. King Louis XIV ennobled Sainte-Marthe for his victory against the Dutch. The king had a medal struck to commemorate this feat of arms. Amblimont was made the first marquis d'Amblimont by letters patent.

== Later career (1674–96) ==
Islands in the Lesser Antilles

In 1677 Amblimont cruised in the Antilles in the Alycon in the squadron of Admiral Jean II d'Estrées and assisted in the seizure of Tobago. On 7 May 1678 d'Estrées launched an expedition from Saint Christopher Island against the Dutch base of Curaçao. He had 18 of the king's warships supported by more than 12 buccaneer vessels. His course was down the Lesser Antilles and then west past the Orchila, Roques and Aves islands. The fleet strayed too far south when near the Aves Archipelago and during the night of 11–12 May 1678 the fleet began to strike the reefs. Amblimont's Défenseur (50) was among the warships that sank. Others were the flagship Terrible (70), Belliqueux (70), Tonnant (66), Bourbon (56), Prince and Hercule. Six other ships sank, 500 men were drowned and the French lost most of their guns. The shattered remnants of the force had to retreat towards Saint-Domingue (Haiti).

In 1680 Aublimont was made a commander of the Order of Saint Lazarus. In 1683, sailing with Jean Bart on the Modéré, he helped capture two Spanish vessels in the vicinity of Cádiz. In 1686, still on the Modéré, he was part of a small squadron under Job Forant^{(fr)} and engaged in battle near Cape Finisterre. On 2 May 1687 Amblimont left La Rochelle on the 52-gun Arc-en-ciel in command of a squadron with two other warships, Perle and Profond, and two transports carrying twelve companies of marine troops to combat the Iroquois threat. The flotilla made a fast passage and reached Quebec City on 29 May 1687.

In January 1688 Amblimont married Catherine Balarin de Parisot. Their son, Claude Thomas Renart de Fuschamberg d'Amblimont, also became a squadron leader.

Amblimont distinguished himself at the start of the Nine Years' War (1688–97) in a battle where, with four frigates, he attacked five English vessels, sank two, burned a third and took a fourth. On 27 July 1689 as commander of the Profond Amblimont destroyed a Dutch squadron off the Texel. On 24 May 1692 on the Victorieux he took part in the Battle of La Hougue, for which he was promoted to squadron commander. He was promoted to chef d'escadre in January 1693. He was made a commander of the Order of Saint Louis when that order was established later in 1693.

== Governor general of the Antilles (1696–1700) ==
Charles de Courbon de Blénac, governor general of the French Antilles, died on 10 June 1696 and was succeeded as interim governor general by Charles de Pechpeyrou-Comminges de Guitaut. Amblimont was appointed governor general on 1 September 1696, and was received in Martinique on 14 March 1697. He died in Martinique on 17 August 1700. Guitaut was again interim governor until Charles Desnotz took office on 23 May 1701.

== Sources ==
- Falardeau, Yves (January 2017), Le passé militaire de Guillaume Falardeau (in French), Orléans, Ontario: Amicale Falardeau
- Guët, Isidore (1893), Origines de la Martinique. Le colonel François de Collart et la Martinique de son temps; colonisation, sièges, révoltes et combats de 1625 à1720, Vannes: Lafolye
- Lerot, P. (1866), Les gloires maritimes de la France: notices biographiques sur les plus célèbres marins, découvreurs,... (in French), A. Bertrand
- Marley, David (1998), Wars of the Americas: A Chronology of Armed Conflict in the New World, 1492 to the Present, ABC-CLIO, ISBN 978-0-87436-837-6
- Perissat, Frederic (14 December 2015), "Arrete No 2015-816" (PDF), Recuil des actes administratifs
- Pierfit, "Thomas Claude RENART de FUCHSAMBERG d'AMBLIMONT Chef d'escadre d'AMBLIMONT", Geneanet (in French)
- Rickard, J. (12 December 2000), "Third Anglo-Dutch War (1672-1674)", History of War
- Saint-Méry, Médéric Louis Élie Moreau de (1784), Loix et constitutions des colonies françoises de l'Amerique sous le vent... (in French), L'Auteur
- Thomas Claude Renard de Fuchsamberg Amblimont (marquis d', 1642-1700) (in French), BnF: Bibliotheque nationale de France
- Vergé-Franceschi, Michel (1990), Les Officiers généraux de la marine royale (1715-1774): Introduction. Sources. Bibliographie. Roturiers anoblis (in French), Librairie de l'Inde, ISBN 978-2-905455-04-8
