= Charles de Courbon de Blénac =

French military officer, nobleman and colonial administrator

Charles de Courbon, marquis de la Roche-Courbon, comte de Blénac

Lieutenant general of the French Antilles
- In office 1677 – February 1683
- Preceded by: Jean-Charles de Baas; Gabriel de Jolinet (interim)
- Succeeded by: Claude de Roux (interim)

Lieutenant general of the French Antilles
- In office 20 April 1684 – February 1691
- Preceded by: Claude de Roux (interim)
- Succeeded by: François d'Alesso, Marquis d'Éragny

Governor general of the French Antilles
- In office 24 November 1691 – June 1696
- Preceded by: Charles de Pechpeyrou-Comminges de Guitaut
- Succeeded by: Thomas-Claude Renart de Fuchsamberg

Personal details
- Born: 1622 Romegoux, Saintonge, Kongdom of France
- Died: 9–10 June 1696 Fort Royal, Martinique, Kingdom of France
- Occupation: Soldier, naval officer

Charles de Courbon, comte de Blénac (1622 – 10 June 1696) was a French military officer, nobleman and colonial administrator who served as governor general of the French Antilles during the 17th century. He was an experienced soldier and fought for the king during the Fronde before becoming a naval officer in the French Navy. Towards the end of the Franco-Dutch War he led the land forces that captured Tobago from the Dutch before taking command of the French Antilles. During the Nine Years' War he was active in the struggle with the English and Dutch in the Windward Islands. He captured Sint Eustatius and Saint Kitts, and defended Martinique against a large English expedition in 1693.

== Early years (1622–77) ==
Charles de Blénac, Marquis de la Roche-Courbon, was born to a noble family in 1622 in Romegoux, Saintonge. His parents were Jacques de Courbon Blénac and Marie Thison, dame de La Sauzaie. His sister Marie married André de Talleyrand-Périgord. Charles de Blénac married Angélique de La Rochefoucauld, daughter of Louis de la Rochefoucauld, seigneur de Bayères. She was the widow of his cousin. They would have eleven children.

During the Fronde rebellion (1648–53) Blénac supported the infant King Louis XIV, and in recognition of his services was made count of Blénac in 1659. For a long time he served in the land armies, reaching the rank of maréchal de camp. In 1669 he transferred to the navy, which was then in the process of being formed. He advanced quickly through the ranks and became capitaine de vaisseau. He commanded the Infante in the expedition of Jean II d'Estrées against the Barbary pirates. He commanded the Fort in the Battle of Solebay in 1672. Blénac was quick to take offense, and early in 1673 was briefly imprisoned for insulting a superior officer. After his release, in August 1673 he was captain of Fortuné in the Battle of Texel.

== First Battle of Tobago (March 1677) ==
The Franco-Dutch War began in 1672 and lasted until the Treaties of Nijmegen in 1678.

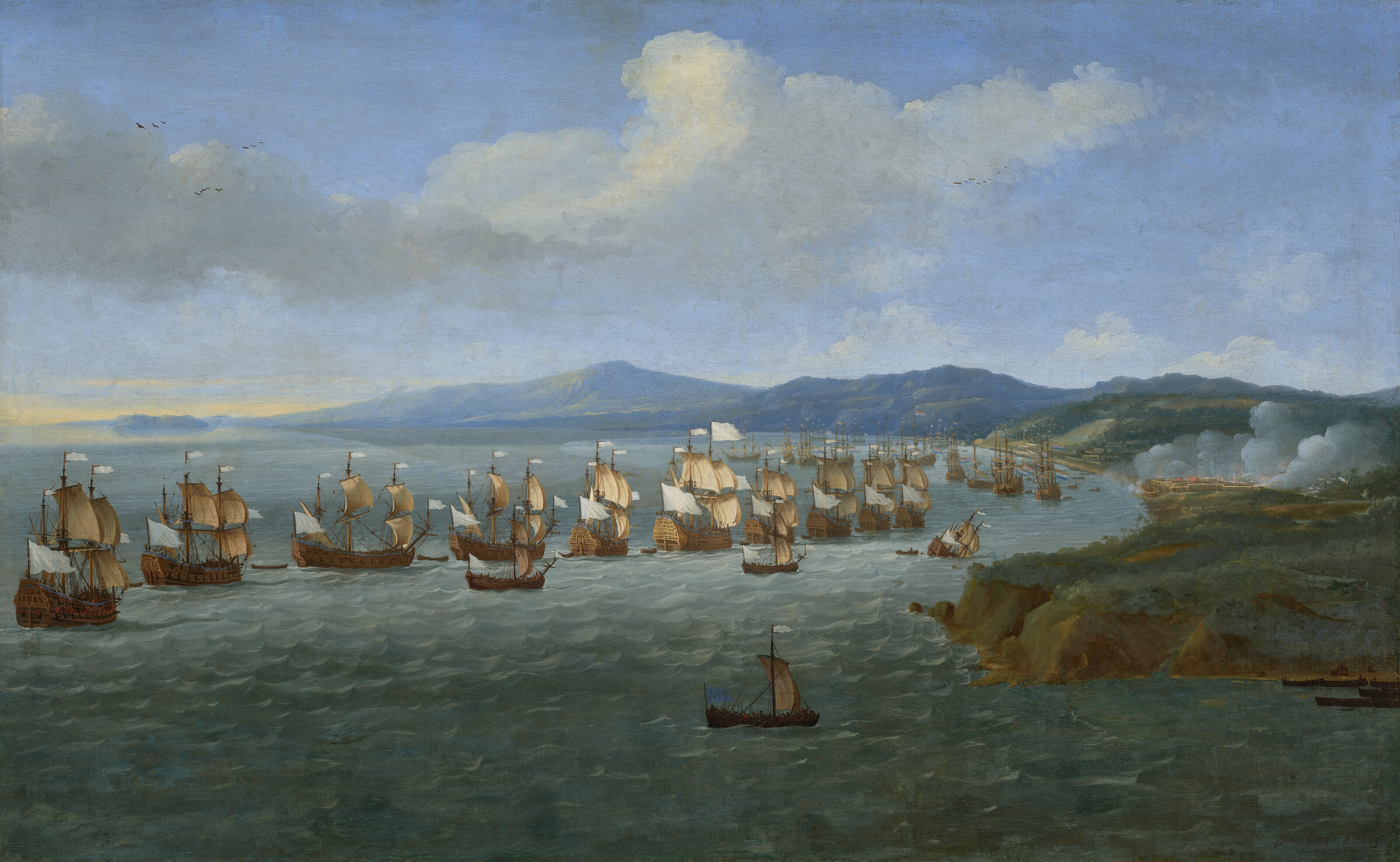
First Battle of Tobago.

In the action of March 1677 a French force under Admiral Jean II d'Estrées attempted to take the Dutch fortress of Sterrshans on Tobago but was repulsed. D'Estrees entered Klip Bay at dawn on 3 March 1677 in his flagship, the 72-gun Glorieux, accompanied by the 58-gun Précieux, 46-gun Émerillon and 38-gun Laurier. His second in command Louis Gabaret in the 56-gun Intrépide led a squadron nearer to the shore that included the 62-gun Fendant commanded by Blénac and four smaller ships. The French engaged an arc of anchored Dutch warships, under-manned since the Dutch had transferred many men to the land defenses. French land forces attempted to storm fort Sterreschans but were repulsed on three separate attempts. The struggling ships in the harbour began to burn, with fire spreading from one ship to another. Eventually the French had to break off after three ships had been burned to the waterline, two run ashore and other badly damaged, with over 1,000 casualties. D'Estree withdrew toward Grenada and was back in France by early July.

During the retreat to Grenada the French heard of the death of Jean-Charles de Baas, and Blénac was appointed to replace him as lieutenant general of the Antilles (lieutenant-général des isles d’Amérique). He returned to France with D'Estrées to have his appointment confirmed. Louis XIV decided to mount another expedition against Tobago later in 1677. Blénac and returned with d'Estrees in the autumn of 1677, taking office in November.

== Second Battle of Tobago (December 1677) ==
Islands in the Lesser Antilles

On 3 October 1677 d'Estrées left Brest for the West Indies with a squadron of seven ships of the line, four smaller ships, five en flûte ships and four fireships. It was the strongest naval force that France had ever sent to the Americas. D'Estrées had the 68-gun Terrible as his flagship. His second in command was François-Bénédict de Rouxel^{(fr)}, marquis de Grancey in the 64-gun Tonnant, and Blénac commanded the 60-gun Belliqueux. Blénac had instructions to coordinate his action as governor general with d'Estrées, and to recruit soldiers and colonists as reinforcements. The squadron sailed to the Cape Verde Islands, took the slaving island of Gorée (off Senegal) from the Dutch, then sailed fast to the Antilles. D'Estrées stopped briefly at Barbados to find out what he could about the strength of the Dutch, then reached Tobago on 6 December 1677.

Blénac led the land force of 950 men, with an artillery train to besiege the Dutch fort. The mortars and cannon had to be dragged about 4 miles (6.4 km) to the top of a hill that overlooked the fort, which took three days. The third shell fired by the French hit the powder magazine, and the explosion destroyed the fort. 250 men died, including Admiral Jacob Binckes and 16 officers. The French attacked at once and within an hour had seized what remained of the fort as well as four sinking ships. They took 600 prisoners. The French destroyed all the houses and plantation buildings on the island, deported the people and abandoned the island. This victory destroyed Dutch military power in the Antilles. D'Estrées next sailed to Martinique to prepare an attack on Curaçao. (Note: D'Estrées delayed the attack on Curaçao for four months while he tried to recruit more forces, and finally left on 7 May. His fleet ran onto coral reefs off the Las Aves archipelago, lost all but one of the ships of the line, and was forced to return to France.) Blénac raised a large contingent of buccaneers to support this expedition.

== Governor general of the Antilles (1677–90) ==
=== Peacetime (1677–88) ===
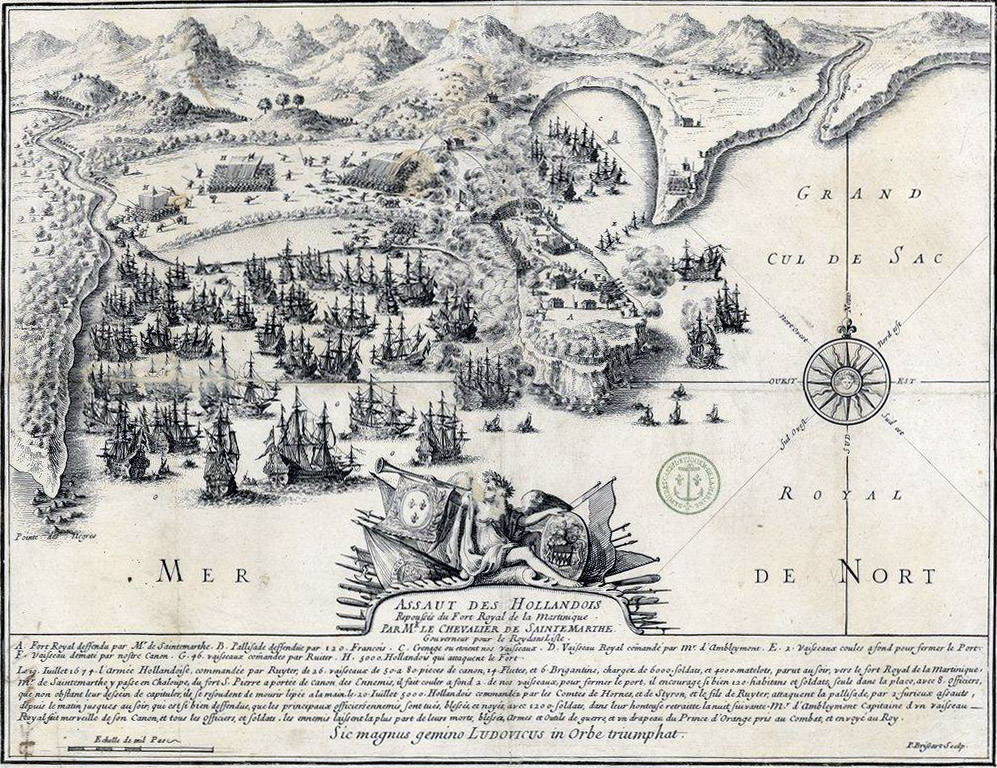
A lithograph of the unsuccessful Dutch attack on Martinique in 1674. One of Blénac's key priorities was to strengthen the island's defences.

During Blénac's time in office as governor general of the Antilles he devoted much of his energy to developing the city of Fort-Royal, Martinique, which de Baas had established as the seat of the lieutenant general of the Antilles. He chose to live at Fort-Royal instead of Saint-Pierre to encourage growth of the town and the fortress. Before this, the town had been an unplanned cluster of buildings along the Carénage River. Blénac ordered the bogs around the site to be drained or filled in, making room for a grid of streets centered on a main square known as the Savane (Swamp). He began construction of a church and strengthened the defenses of the citadel. He reported to the king in 1686,

I do not believe that you have in the islands of America a colonist better established than I am in Cul-de-Sac at Fort-Royal. There were not more than three sugar-refineries when I arrived; there are presently 57. There was not a single hen; now it is filled with cattle, pigs, horses, and poultry. I have made you a town and a church constructed of stone.... I have made you a fort which provides security for all these islands.

In 1680, Blénac accused the colonial governor of Saint Croix of illegally allowing foreign merchants to conduct business, in particular slave traders. Two years later, Jean-Baptiste Colbert appointed his first cousin Michel Bégon as intendant of the French colonies in the Caribbean, head of the civil and legal administration. He was charged with preparing an ordinance to regulate slavery in French American colonies. Bégon sailed for Martinique that fall, where Blénac showed him what had been done so far on codifying the slave laws. Bégon spent the next three months studying all the slave ordinances of the French islands, then talked with leading officials and slave owners of Martinique, Guadeloupe and Saint Christophe. He condensed his findings into a 16-page memorandum that was sent to Versailles in February 1683 and became the basis, with a few small adjustments, of the March 1685 edict known as the Code Noir (Black Code). The king had asked Blénac to participate in drafting the slave code, but he claimed to have done little, and said only that Begin constructed the law "in his presence". He did help make some provisions concerning slaves milder and more flexible.

Blénac left the Martinique for France in March 1683, and returned in April 1684. Claude de Roux de Saint-Laurent, chevalier de Saint-Laurent, acted as governor in his absence. Just before the start of the Nine Years' War, in October 1688 the navy secretary, the marquis de Seignelay informed Blénac and the island governors to prepare to defend themselves against Spain, since war with Spain was likely once Louis XIV declared war on the Dutch Republic. The governors were to inspect their fortifications, prepare artillery batteries, and make their militias and local defense forces ready to fight. France would give no support other than send two privateers from Saint-Malo to attack Dutch ships.

=== War with Holland and England (1688–90) ===
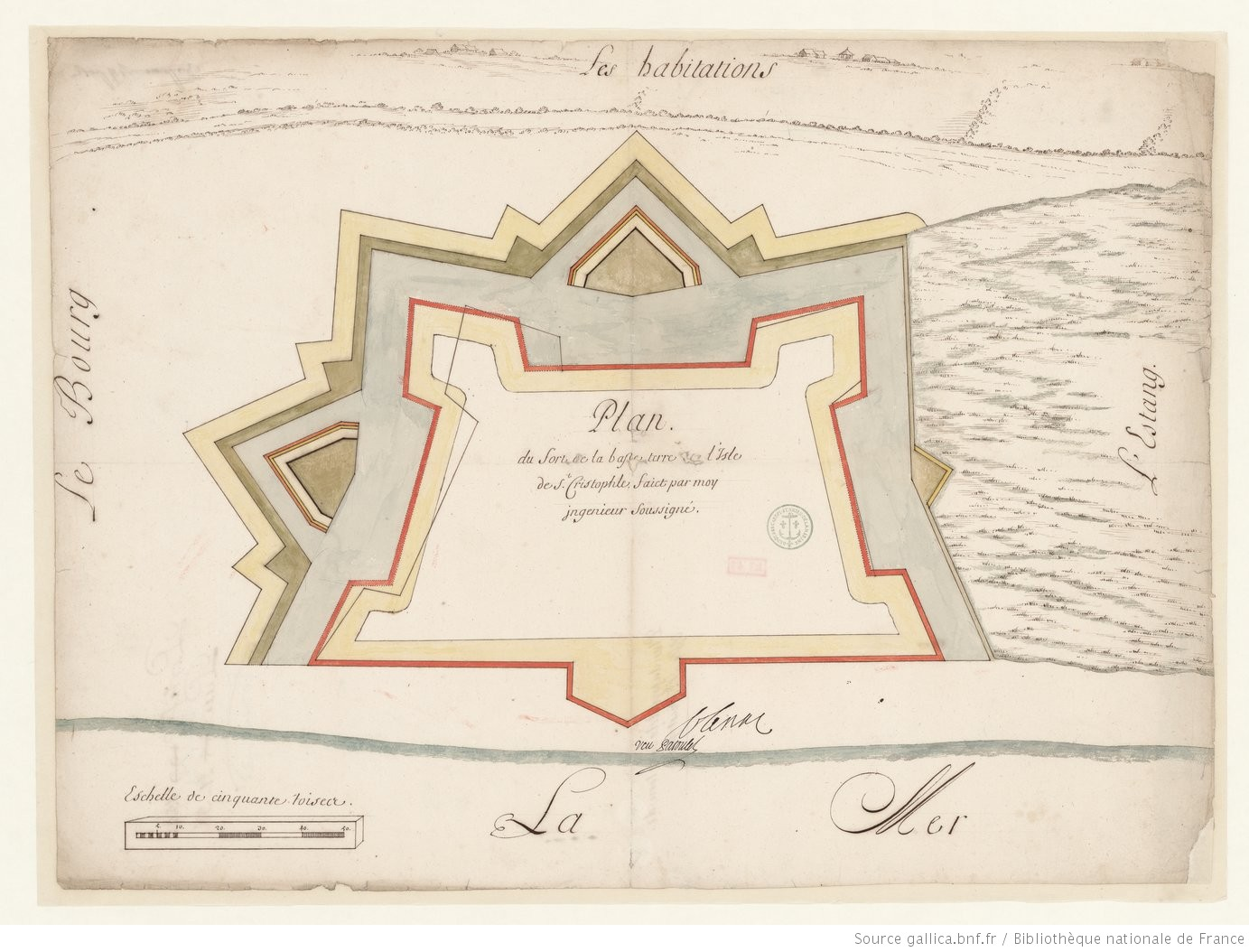
Plan du fort de la Basse terre de l'isle de St. Christophle signed by Blénac

At the start of the Nine Years' War (1688–97), in November 1688 Seignelay told Blénac to attack Sint Eustatius, to the northwest of Saint Christophe, destroy the island's fort and deport all the inhabitants. He was to use local forces only, and to cover the costs by selling slaves. The minister changed his mind when he heard that several large Dutch privateers were leaving for the Antilles, and before year end he heard that privateers were pillaging some of the small and indefensible French islands. In March 1689 Seignelay sent the 52-gun Perle to Martinique, and after Louis XIV declared war on Spain in April 1689 he sent the frigates Mignon and Friponne to the Antilles to defend the colonies and the French traders, and to attack the Dutch privateers. When England declared war on France in May 1689 Seignelay placed four warships at the disposal of Blénac. Blénac also used buccaneers as auxiliaries, particularly during the start of the war in 1689 during attacks on Saint Kitts and Sint Eustatius.

In the West Indies the English would not cooperate with their Dutch allies. Blénac took advantage of this, and sent a secret expedition that captured Sint Eustatius. On 28 March 1689 a small fleet of three ships, a brigantine, a bark and three smaller vessels under Blénac and the Intendant Gabriel Dumaitz de Goimpy was joined by another ship at Guadeloupe. At Saint Christopher (Saint Kitts) they were joined by three brigantines and three barks. With 17 vessels and 1,200 men Blénac set course for the Dutch island of Sint Eustatius, where he arrived on 3 April 1689. The Dutch under Governor Lucas Schorer were totally unprepared for the attack, and just two ships managed to escape carrying valuables. The French landed at two places on the island, and after slight resistance the Dutch retreated into Fort Orange in the evening. The next morning, after the French threatened the fort with siege guns the Dutch surrendered and agreed to leave the island. The French destroyed all shore defenses, collected booty and departed, leaving a small 40-man garrison.

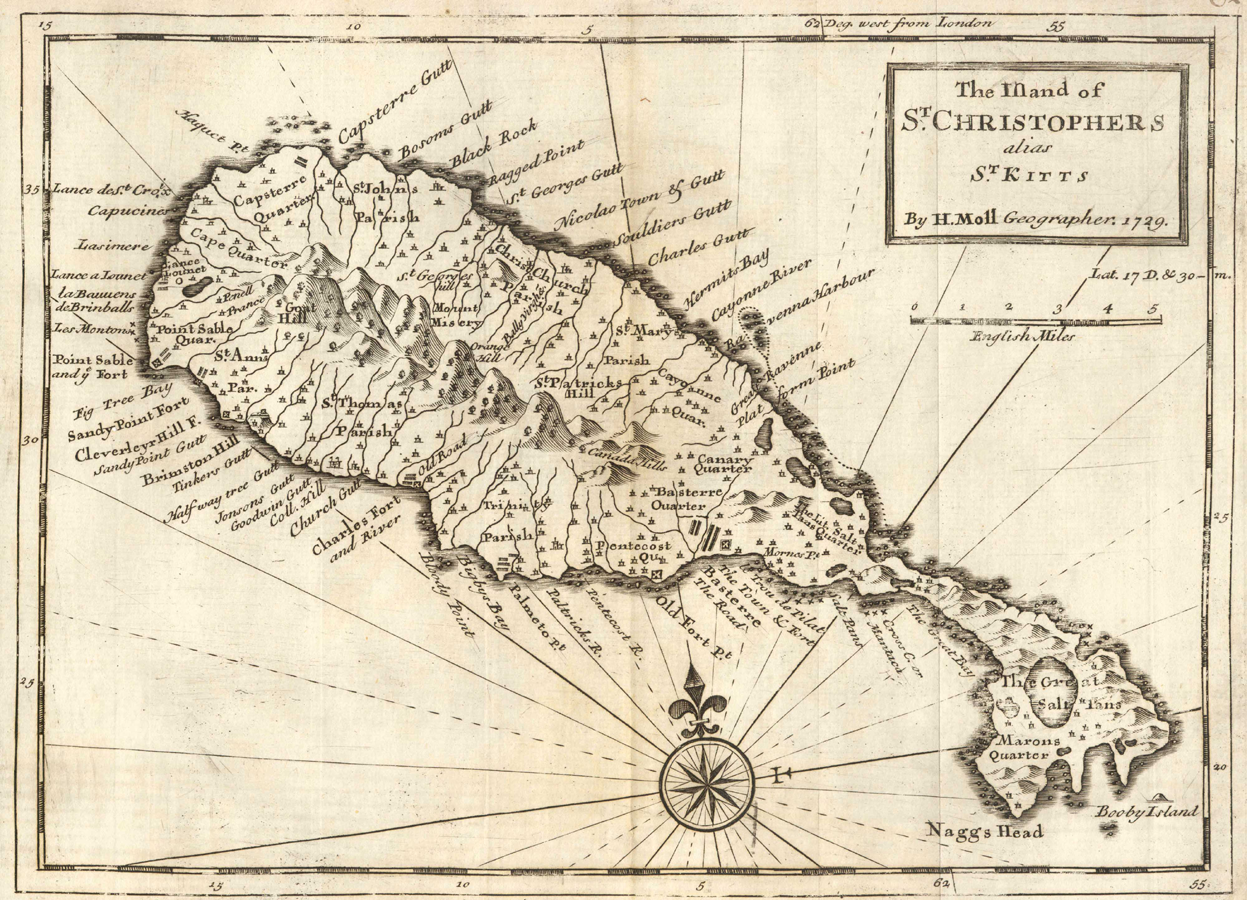
Saint Christopher. Fort Charles is on the south coast of the west part. Basseterre, also on the south coast, is further east.

In July 1689 Blénac heard that there were violent disagreements on Saint Kitts between supporters of King William III of England and Irish Jacobites. On 27 July 1689, after the dispatch vessel Perle had brought news that England and France were at war, Blénac sailed from Martinique with the warships Hasardeux, Émerillon, Loire, Dauphine and Cheval Marin, 14 merchantmen and 23 sloops. He arrived at Basseterre on the French part of Saint Christopher and landed his army, which quickly occupied all the south of the island. The English governor, Colonel Thomas Hill, took refuge with 400 to 500 defenders in Fort Charles. Blénac settled down for a siege, and for two weeks bombarded the main gate with over 1,000 rounds, achieving little, while a trench was being dug towards the fort. The naval officer Jean-Baptiste du Casse then obtained permission to install a battery on nearby hill from which the interior of the fort could be seen; this was done on the night of 14–15 August. When the fort's defenders found their gunfire could not reach the new, higher battery they surrendered. The English colonists were all ordered to evacuate to Nevis, while the indentured Irish stayed and became French subjects. Blénac sailed for Martinique ten days later leaving Charles de Pechpeyrou-Comminges de Guitaut as governor.

In response, an English force invaded and occupied Saint Barthélemy, making off with slaves, cattle and other goods, and burned all the houses. They made an attempt on Saint Martin that was driven off, then made a highly destructive raid on Marie-Galante. The French learned that the English governor Sir Christopher Codrington was planning to lead a force of about 2,300 to attack Martinique, and was waiting for warships to be fitted out in England to carry his force. Early in 1690 Blénac received over 30 merchantmen escorted by four warships, but chose to take no action against the English, and did not even have the resources to defend his recent conquests.

== Return to France (1690–96) ==
Subordinates such as Ducasse were so critical of Blénac's lack of action that he offered to resign. Blénac left Martinique on 29 January 1690 and returned to France "on leave" on the Pont d'Or to defend himself at court. By July the British had reconquered Saint Kitts and Sint Eustatius. Blénac's successor François d'Alesso, Marquis d'Éragny arrived on 5 February 1691 with 14 warships, strengthened the defenses and in May relieved the French defenders of Fort Saint-Charles in Guadeloupe, who had been besieged by the English. On his return to Martinique d'Eragny was among the victims of an outbreak of yellow fever in August 1691.

== Governor general of the Antilles (1692–96) ==
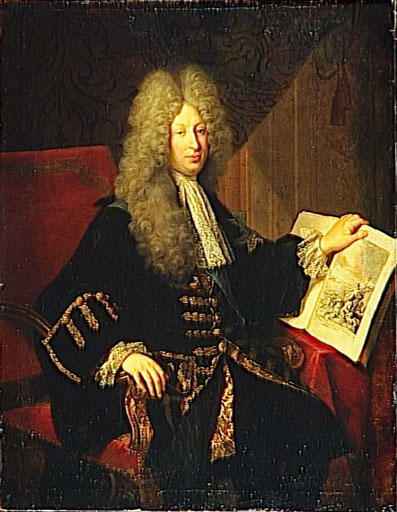
Louis Phélypeaux, comte de Pontchartrain, chancelier de France

Louis XIV sent Jean-Baptiste du Casse to help defend the Antilles late in 1691. The king reappointed Blénac as governor general of the Windward Islands. The comte de Pontchartrain gave Blénac a fleet of ten warships, one frigate and two fire ships. He was ordered to attack Barbados and go on to destroy the property of the English colonists in the Leeward Islands. Blénac arrived back in Martinique on 4 February 1692.

On 2 March 1692 a convoy of merchant ships escorted by Commodore Ralph Wrenn was passing between Guadeloupe and Désirade. The English found Blénac ahead of them in his flagship, the 62-gun Vermandois, supported by the Vaillant, Léger, François, Droite, Basque, Chasseur, Solide, Bouffone, Jersey, Neptune and five smaller vessels. The English were completely outnumbered, and set a course to the leeward in the hope of protecting the convoy. Blénac engaged the next day, but Wrenn outmanoeuvred him and managed to escape to the south. Wrenn reached Barbados three days later without any losses.

After this the English and French found themselves in a stalemate, where neither could risk invading an enemy island while the other's fleet was intact. The crews of both squadrons suffered from yellow fever, and Wrenn died of the disease. Blénac only had enough sailors to man three warships by the start of July. News came that the English were organizing a major expedition under Sir Francis Wheler to attach the French Antilles. Blénac was told he could not expect help from France. Blénac had been accompanied to Martinique by an engineer, Sieur de Caylus, and during 1692 he directed improvements to the island's defenses while Blénac organized the militia of almost 1,400 men. Pontchartrain ordered that the five vessels of the French navy in the Antilles leave by 1 March 1693.

In 1693 Blénac and the governor of Martinique, Nicolas de Gabaret, repulsed the English when they attempted invasion with a force of 4,000 men. (Note: A 1780 French history says the English force was led by "Admiral Houkille".) The English expedition under Admiral Wheler had 15 warships 3 fire ships, 28 transports and almost 2,000 soldiers, to which Barbados added another 1,000 men. This force invaded in March 1693, and took control of a large area with little opposition. English reinforcements under Captain General Christopher Codrington arrived within two weeks, but the combined force did not engage in serious fighting. The English captured 3,000 black slaves, valued at £60,000. An ineffective attack was made on Saint Pierre, then the force departed. Various explanations have been given for the failure to make a serious effort to capture the island. The reason seems to be a combination of the climate, raw troops including unenthusiastic Irish and superior French forces. The French under Ducasse retaliated, but limited their activity to plundering.

Blénac died near Fort Royal, Martinique on the night of 8-9 June 1696 from lingering dysentery. He was succeeded by the Thomas-Claude Renart de Fuchsamberg, marquis d'Amblimont.

== Sources ==
- d'Aspect, M. (1780), Histoire de l'Ordre royal et militaire de St-Louis (in French), Duchesne
- Cahoon, Ben, Martinique
- Eclavea, Christine (25 May 2018), "Charles de Courbon, comte de Blénac", Geni (in French)
- Lampin, Didier, "Charles de Blénac, marquis de la Roche-Courbon, comte de Blénac (1622-1696)", La Martinique à la carte... (in French)
- Marley, David (1998), Wars of the Americas: A Chronology of Armed Conflict in the New World, 1492 to the Present, ABC-CLIO, ISBN 978-0-87436-837-6
- Marley, David (2005), Historic Cities of the Americas: An Illustrated Encyclopedia, ABC-CLIO, ISBN 978-1-57607-027-7
- Marley, David (2010), Pirates of the Americas, ABC-CLIO, ISBN 978-1-59884-201-2
- Morgan, William Thomas (September 1930), "The British West Indies during King William's War (1689-97)", The Journal of Modern History, 2 (3): 378–409, doi:10.1086/235621, JSTOR 1898817, S2CID 144978109
- O'Malley, Gregory E. (2014-09-02), Final Passages: The Intercolonial Slave Trade of British America, 1619-1807, UNC Press Books, ISBN 978-1-4696-1535-6
- Pritchard, James S. (2004-01-22), In Search of Empire: The French in the Americas, 1670-1730, Cambridge University Press, ISBN 978-0-521-82742-3
- Rushforth, Brett (2013-06-01), Bonds of Alliance: Indigenous and Atlantic Slaveries in New France, UNC Press Books, ISBN 978-0-8078-3817-4
- Sommerville, J.P., The wars of Louis XIV, University of Wisconsin–Madison, archived from the original on 2018-09-01
- Woodcock, Henry Iles (1867), A History of Tobago, author
