= Charles-François de Machault de Belmont =

French Navy officer and colonial administrator

Governor general of the French Antilles
- In office 4 March 1703 – 1709
- Preceded by: Nicolas de Gabaret (interim)
- Succeeded by: Nicolas de Gabaret (interim); Raymond Balthazar Phélypeaux

Personal details
- Born: c. 1640
- Died: 1709
- Occupation: Naval officer

Charles-François de Machault de Belmont (c. 1640 – 1709) was a French Navy officer and colonial administrator who served as governor general of the French Antilles from 1703 to 1709. He held office during the War of the Spanish Succession, when the French colony on Saint Kitts was lost to the English and the other islands were under constant threat.

== Family ==
Charles de Machault, chevalier, seigneur de Belmont, was the son of François de Machault (1601–78), seigneur de La Motte-Romaincourt, Almoner of the Duke of Orléans, Treasurer of France in Picardy. His mother was Geneviève Sauzion, daughter of Jean de Sauzion, the king's secretary. His older brother was Claude de Machault (died 1678), seigneur de Garges et Romaincourt.

== Naval career ==
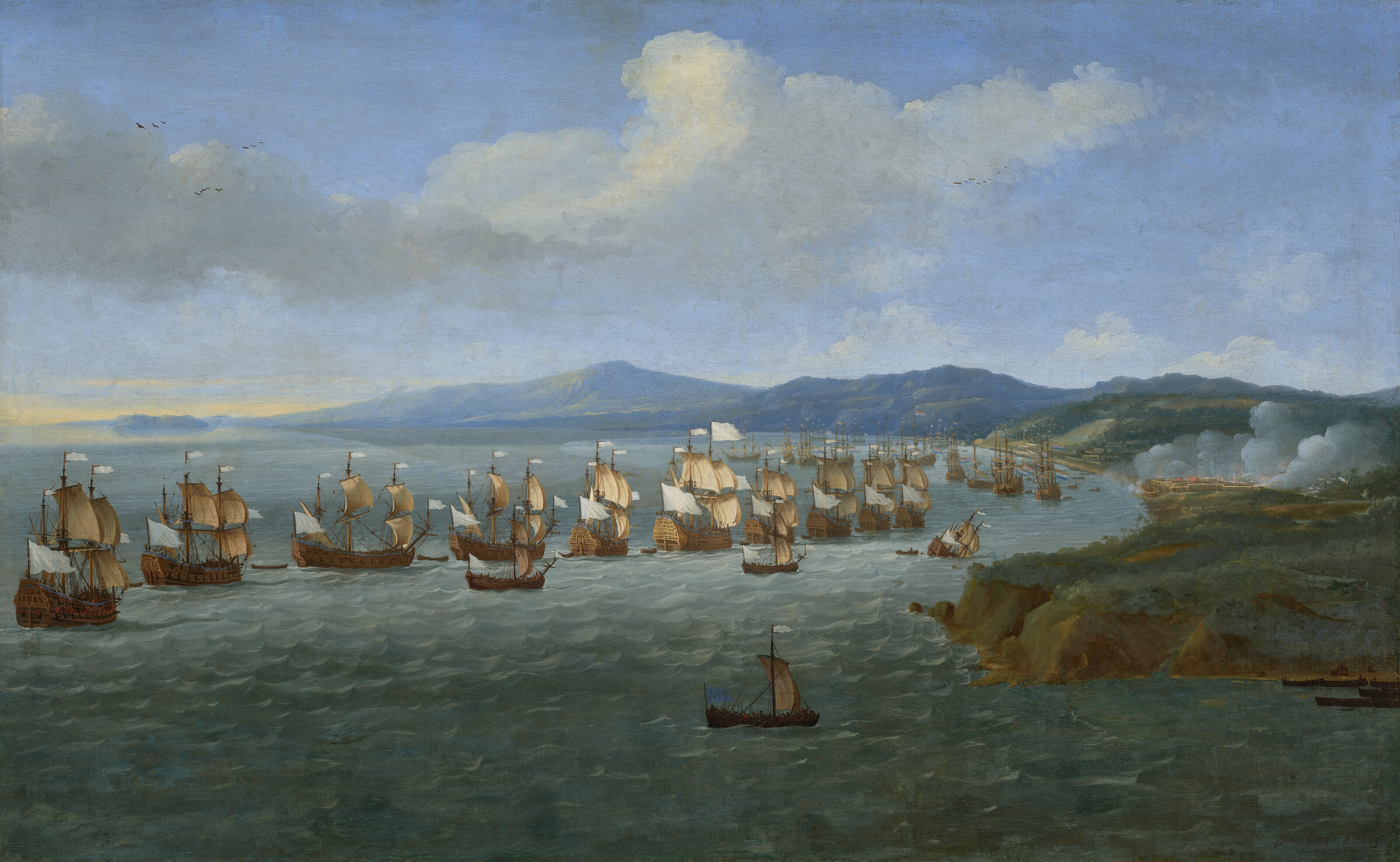
First Battle of Tobago

Machaut became a ship-of-the-line captain in the French royal navy and a knight of the Order of Saint Louis. He was appointed lieutenant de vaisseau in 1667. In 1671 he was promoted to capitaine de frégate and in 1673 to capitaine de vaisseau. From 1676 to 1677 he was in command of Le Laurier (40). On 3 March 1677 he fought under Admiral Jean II d'Estrées in the First Battle of Tobago. In 1683 he was in command of Le Fendant (54). In 1689 he was in command of Le Vermandois (60). On 1 April 1689 he fought in the Battle of Bantry Bay. In 1690 he was in command of Le Parfait (64). He fought in the Battle of Beachy Head on 30 June 1690. As a capitaine de vaisseau Machault visited Martinique in January 1702 en route from Lisbon to join the Spanish fleet in Havana in the squadron of vice-admiral the comte de Chateau-Reynaut.

== Governor general of the Antilles ==
=== Appointment ===
Charles Desnotz, governor general of the French Antilles, died on 6 October 1701, and Charles de Pechpeyrou-Comminges de Guitaut became interim governor general. Marc Hyacinthe de Rosmadec was named on 4 January 1702 to succeed Denotz, but died in Havana before taking office. Machault was appointed governor as of 1 July 1702. He was informed of his appointment by a letter of 28 June 1702. On 7 September Guitaud also died, and was replaced as interim governor by Nicolas de Gabaret, who held office until Machault reached Martinique. A letter of 27 November 1702 emphasised the urgency of Machault's departure. Machault finally presented his credentials to the sovereign council in Martinique on 24 March 1703. He brought a promotion for Gabaret to second in command to the governor general (king's lieutenant to the general government of the islands).

=== Defense of Guadeloupe ===
Islands in the Lesser Antilles

Machault took office during the War of the Spanish Succession (1701–1713), in which France was opposed by Germany, Britain and the Dutch Republic. On 1 November 1702 he was informed of the loss of Saint-Christophe to the English, with the garrison of three companies withdrawn from this island to Martinique. On 20 December 1702 he was informed of the threat to Guadeloupe from the English governor Christopher Codrington.

When he reached Martinique in late March 1703 Machault found that the intendant François-Roger Robert was gathering reinforcements for Guadeloupe, which the English had invaded. 1,500 men volunteered, of whom 700 were chosen for the expedition. Gabaret, who was senior to governor Charles Auger of Guadeloupe, was given overall command. Nine barques, two ships and a brigantine (Trompeuse, Union, and Samaritaine) were used for transport, and left in the morning of 31 March 1703 escorted by two warships and a frigate that Machault had brought to the West Indies. To prepare for any event, Machault remained in Martinique with at least 1,400 good soldiers. Gabaret arrived in Guadeloupe on 3 April 1703. He pursued scorched earth tactics that proved effective in combination with the effect on the English of climate and drink. The English withdrew on 15 May 1703.

In order to attack Guadeloupe with the maximum forces, the English had denuded their other colonies of armed men. Machault was told that Saint Christophe was completely defenseless and could easily be retaken. Machault had three warships at Fort Royal, six or seven well-armed merchant vessels and several corsair ships, but chose not to take advantage of the opportunity. After the return of the force from Guadeloupe on 21 May 1703, Machault proposed to reorganized the West Indies militia so he could reward their service in Guadeloupe by promotions. He would convert the four battalions that Blenac has created in 1693 into four regiments commanded by colonels and lieutenant colonels, and would also create a cavalry regiment. The minister Count Jérôme Phélypeaux de Pontchartrain agreed with the proposal, obtained approval from the king, and asked Machault to provide a list of the newly promoted or created officers with details of their service.

=== Corsairs and trade ===
During the wartime conditions of Machault's term of office both privateering and illegal trade with the enemy seem to have been common given the shortage of adequate supplies from France. In 1703 almost twenty vessels based in Martinique, Guadeloupe and Saint-Domingue were engaged in attacks on enemy shipping. In 1704 thirty privateers took 163 prizes. Prizes and captured goods were sold in the French islands and in Spanish American ports. On 4 July 1703 Machault issued a decree that attempted to settle disputes between corsairs when several were involved in taking a prize. A general rule was that a corsair could only claim a prize if it had been with the range of a cannon. An exception was made when a prize being hunted by one corsair was taken by another to the leeward.

Many of the French administrators including local governors were accused of accepting bribes to turn a blind eye to the slave trade, or of trading in slaves on their own account. In 1703 Machault denied accusations, saying "In times of war and peace, it has remained my concern to stop the abuses." Due in part to illicit trade the slave population on Martinique grew by 28.8% from 1702 to 1709. At one point Machault and intendant Nicolas François Arnoul de Vaucresson were given special permission to trade sugar from Martinique for salt beef and other provisions at Saint Thomas, Barbados.

=== Trial of de Gennes ===
After the comte Jean-Baptiste de Gennes surrendered Saint Christophe to the English in 1702 he embarked for Cayenne with all the goods and slaves he had been able to salvage. He was captured by a Dutch corsair and taken to Saint Thomas, Barbados. From there he was returned to Martinique. Machault seems to have been instructed by the court as governor general to prosecute the Comte de Gennes, but in such a way as not to besmirch his honour unless he was found guilty of excessive cowardice. When he reached Martinique the count was arrested and taken to Fort Saint Pierre, Major Coullet was told to start investigating his case and that of his lieutenants. Everyone interviewed recalled that Saint Christophe had been considered indefensible, and that de Guitaut and the intendant had planned to send boats to transport its inhabitants to other islands.

However, it seemed that the prosecution had been directed to find a culprit. After a short inquiry Gennes was tried in August 1704, found guilty of cowardice and condemned to be degraded from the nobility and stripped of all his title and positions. Gennes appealed the decision. A few days later the king's ship Thétis arrived at Fort Royal to transport the comte de Germes to France. He was captured by the English and taken to Plymouth, where he died before he could defend himself in France. However, the king treated the case as if he had not been found guilty, and his titles were retained and a pension paid to his widow.

=== Raids on Saint Kitts and Nevis ===
On 2 September 1705 Machault was asked to provide support to the mission against Nevis and Saint Christopher that had just been entrusted to Pierre Le Moyne d'Iberville. The 1706 attacks on Saint Kitts and Nevis were organized from France. One of Iberville's two squadrons left Brest on 15 December 1705 under Count Louis-Henri de Chavagnac and reached Martinique by the end of January 1706. The second, under Iberville, would leave from La Rochelle later.

Machault was unprepared for Chavagnac. When he had heard of the proposed expedition he had written to Louis XIV asking for Martinique to be allowed to concentrate on agriculture rather than war preparations, since otherwise the impoverished inhabitants would be exposed to starvation. He had assumed that his request had been welcomed by the court, and had made no preparations. (Note: The king was affronted by Machault's bold letter, which he did not learn about until April 1706. He sent an angry reply through his minister that reprimanded Machault for daring to discuss the king's orders and ordered him to obey at once. Fortunately, there were no bad consequences on d'Iberville's raid.) Chavagnac was not surprised but immediately complained, and asked to speak to the commanders Collart and du Buq. It emerged that since the king could not afford all the costs of the campaign, Martinique and Guadeloupe were expected to provide armaments, transport and men, and to receive compensation in the form of spoils. In less than eight days Collart and du Buq had organized 400 volunteers, while three hundred buccaneers would accompany them once food had been collected, which was difficult in Martinique at that time. The squadron left for its rendezvous in Guadeloupe on 4 February 1760.

The first landing was made on Saint Christophe in the early hours of 22 February. After some fighting, having caused considerable destruction, collected some slaves and other booty and now short of food, the force left on 28 February 1706 and returned to Martinique in March. Iberville reached Martinique a few days after Chavagnac had returned, and went on to raid Nevis. He overran the whole island, blew up its fort, and returned to Martinique with 22 captured merchant ships. 3,200 slaves and other booty. Many of the slaves were disposed of for the profit of Iberville and his associates rather than that of the investors in the expedition. Iberville sailed to Saint-Domingue, where he sold 1,900 slaves. He went on to Havana, where he died of yellow fever on 9 July 1706.

Machault died in Martinique of yellow fever in 1709. He was succeeded by Gabaret on 7 January 1709. In 1710 Gabaret was in turn succeeded by Raymond Balthazar Phélipeaux.

== Sources ==
- Cahoon, Ben, "Martinique", worldstatesmen.org
- Guet, Isidore (1893), Origines De La Martinique : Le Colonel Francois de Collart et la Martinique de son temps : Colonisation, Sieges, Révoltes et Combats de 1625 a 1720, Vannes: Lafayole. Librairie Editeur
- Marcillac, Sidney Daney de (1846), Histoire de la Martinique: depuis la colonisation jusqu'en 1815 (in French), E. Ruelle
- O'Malley, Gregory E. (2014-09-02), Final Passages: The Intercolonial Slave Trade of British America, 1619–1807, UNC Press Books, ISBN 978-1-4696-1535-6
- Pattou, Etienne (2017), "Famille deMachault" (PDF), Racines er histoire (in French)
- Pritchard, James S. (2004-01-22), In Search of Empire: The French in the Americas, 1670–1730, Cambridge University Press, ISBN 978-0-521-82742-3
- Saint-Méry, Médéric Louis Élie Moreau de (1784), Loix et constitutions des colonies françoises de l'Amerique sous le vent... (in French), L'Auteur
- Secrétariat d'État à la Marine (1702–1709), Machault de Bellemont (Charles François de) (in French)
- Vilette-Mursay, Philippe de (1991), Mes campagnes de mer sous Louis XIV: avec un dictionnaire des personnages et des batailles, France: Tallandier
