= Raymond Balthazar Phélypeaux =

French army officer, lawyer and diplomat

Governor general of the French Antilles
- In office 1710 – October 1713
- Preceded by: Charles-François de Machault de Belmont; Nicolas de Gabaret (interim)
- Succeeded by: Robert Cloche de La Malmaison

Personal details
- Born: c. 1655
- Died: 21 October 1713
- Occupation: Soldier, lawyer, diplomat

Raymond Balthazar Phélypeaux (c. 1655 – 21 October 1713), seigneur du Verger, was a French army officer, lawyer and diplomat. He was a lieutenant general, military councillor of state, envoy extraordinary to Cologne, ambassador extraordinary to Savoy in 1700, and then governor general of the French West Indies.

== Life ==
Raymond Balthazar Phélypeaux was a member of the Phélypeaux family. His grandfather, Raymond Phélypeaux, was secretary of state for foreign affairs. His father, Antoine Phélypeaux (died 1665), seigneur du Verger, secretary of state, was a counselor in the Parlement, intendant of justice in Bourbonnais and councillor of state. His mother, Marie de Villebois (c. 1622-1701), was the daughter of Jacques de Villebois, the king's Maître d'hôtel.

Raymond Balthazar Phélypeaux became an army officer, and was appointed lieutenant-general of the king's armies. He later became a military councillor of state. As a diplomat he was envoy extraordinary to the Prince-Elector of Cologne until 1699.

Phélypeaux was sent as ambassador extraordinary to Savoy in 1700, where he found that a secret treaty was being prepared against the interests of France. He had difficulty convincing his minister of this, and attracted the enmity of Marie Adélaïde of Savoy, wife of Louis, Duke of Burgundy and daughter of Victor Amadeus II of Sardinia. He took a haughty and mocking attitude at the court of Savoy, and was disgraced. Saint-Simon said of him that he has a "spirit like a hundred devils."

In 1709 Phélypeaux was appointed governor general of the Antilles. He did not reach Martinique until early 1711 and died there on 21 October 1713. He never married. His brother Jacques-Antoine Phélypeaux was appointed bishop of Lodève in 1690.

== Sources ==
- Moreri (1707), Le grand dictionnaire historique (in French), vol. IV
- Chauleau, Liliane (1993), "Phélypeaux (1709-1713)", Dans les îles du vent : la Martinique (XVIIe-xixe siècle) (in French), L'Harmattan
- Frostin, Charles (2006), Les Pontchartrain, ministres de Louis XIV : alliances et réseau d'influence sous l'Ancien Régime (in French), Presses universitaires de Rennes
