= Invasion of Martinique (1674) =

Part of the Franco-Dutch War

Coordinates: 14.5999°N 61.0664°W

- Part of the Franco-Dutch War
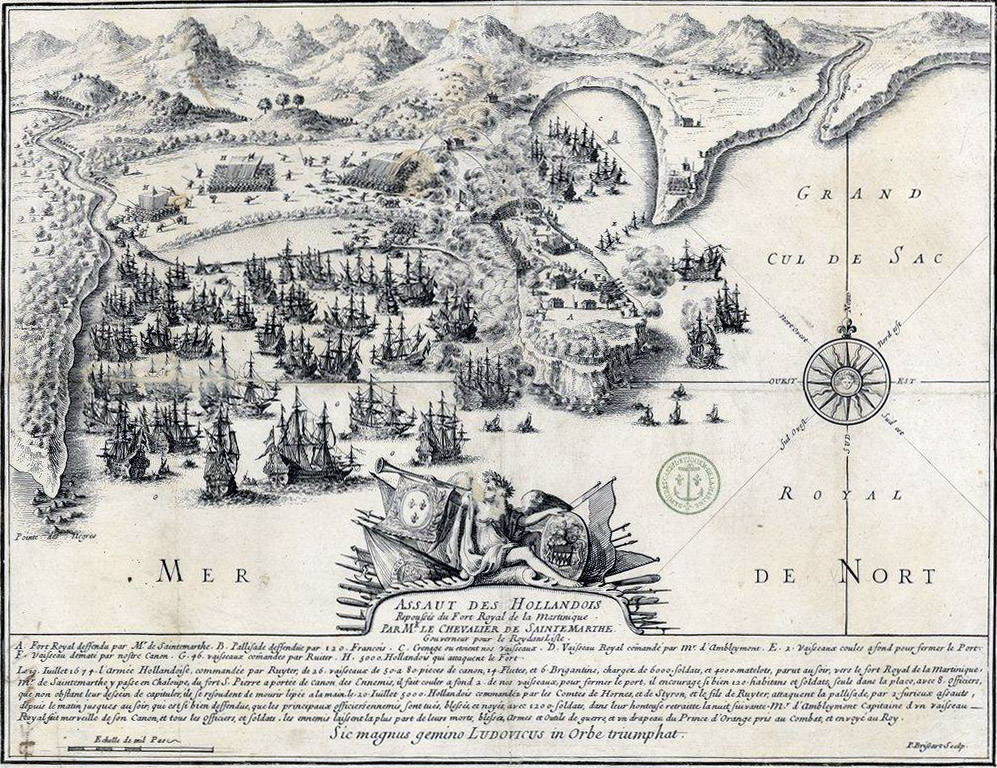
- A French lithograph of the invasion
Date	19–21 July 1674
Location	Fort-Royal, Martinique
Result	French victory

Belligerents
France	Dutch Republic

Commanders and leaders
Thomas-Claude Renart; Antoine André	Michiel de Ruyter

Strength
1 frigate 1 merchant ship 160 men	18 ships of the line 36 smaller ships 7,400 men

Casualties and losses
6 killed 10 wounded	461–1,300 killed or wounded

The invasion of Martinique in 1674 was an unsuccessful attempt by the Dutch Republic to conquer the Caribbean island of Martinique from France. In spite of overwhelming Dutch superiority in men and ships, the French won a decisive and unexpected victory.

== Background ==
In 1672, France and England declared war on the Dutch Republic, sparking the Franco-Dutch War and the Third Anglo-Dutch War. However, Dutch naval victories in the North Sea led the English to sign a peace treaty with the Republic in early 1674. The Dutch could now direct all of their considerable naval strength against the French, and they decided to attack Martinique, the headquarters of French West Indian colonies in the Caribbean. The Dutch believed that the capture of Martinique would enable them to quickly conquer France's other Caribbean colonies and rebuild their own war-ravaged network of West Indian slave plantations, giving them dominance over the entire Lesser Antilles.

To achieve these aims, the Dutch assembled a powerful invasion force under Admiral Michiel de Ruyter, one of the most skilled naval officers of the era. A fleet of 18 ships of the line, including de Ruyter's 80-gun flagship De Zeven Provinciën, plus 36 smaller warships, support ships and troopships, and an invasion army of 7,400 soldiers was placed under his command. The young Count of Styrum was appointed to lead the ground forces and designated to act as military governor, but the assault was entrusted to the Count of Hoorn, the Dutch Republic's most prominent siege-warfare commander.

Martinique was defended by a colonial militia consisting of two companies of cavalry and a dozen infantry companies with a theoretical strength of roughly 2,000 men. However, the defending French commander, the Marquis de Baas, miscalculated by concentrating his forces to defend the seat of government at Saint-Pierre in the north of the island: de Ruyter chose instead to attack the main anchorage at Fort-Royal on the west coast. The fortified citadel at Fort-Royal was manned by the local militia company, and the French warship Les Jeux under the command of Captain Thomas-Claude Renart, while they could expect some additional assistance from the captains and crews of the merchant ships in the harbour. However, most of these were military assets of uncertain reliability and quality.

The Fort-Royal militia company could only muster around 100 men, of whom a quarter quickly deserted, including their captain. Only one of the merchant ships, the Saint-Eustache, was equipped with any significant armament. The citadel was little more than a set of wooden palisades around a steep-sided promontory, with two unfortified artillery positions at the water's edge, a modest battery of four guns pointed outwards from the promontory's southern tip to sweep the outer roadstead of Fort-Royal Bay, and larger emplacement of around a dozen cannon commanding the sheltered anchorage to its east. The most significant military presence was thus the warship Les Jeux, but this was a small frigate, barely 100 feet from bow to stern, armed with just twenty-eight cannons, and carrying a crew of only 150 men.

== Battle ==
A portrait of the Dutch commander, Michiel de Ruyter.

The Dutch fleet arrived off Martinique on the afternoon of 19 July 1674, but calm conditions prevented them from starting their attack that day, and allowed the French to make hurried defensive preparations. Two French merchant ships were scuttled as blockships to impede the deep-water channel leading into the anchorage, and a defensive boom was set across the entrance of the inner harbour; the veteran adventurer Guillaume d'Orange took the lead in organizing the remnants of the militia company. The troops were reinforced by a detachment of sailors, combining volunteers from the crews of the two scuttled merchant ships and a small party of trained musketeers from Les Jeux, and as dawn rose on the morning of 20 July, the island's governor, the Chevalier de Sainte-Marthe, arrived to take command of the defense, with a small contingent of additional militiamen. Even with these reinforcements, his defending force consisted of barely 160 men.

The Dutch attack began around 9 o'clock, with a cannonade by the ships, followed by the first wave of soldiers in a flotilla of open boats. Rather than attacking the harbour directly, they rowed into the largely undefended bay beneath the steep cliffs on the west side of the fortress, coming ashore around 11 o'clock on the beach where the civilian settlement was located, but the defenders fired down from the heights of the fortress, injuring the Count of Styrum. Popular accounts claim that many of the Dutch troops lost their discipline as they landed, and turned to looting a warehouse full of rum, but the commanders rallied their remaining men, and made preparations to assault the fortress.

The Dutch made an assault against the palisade on the landward side of the fort, where they were repulsed by the musket fire of the militia and sailors. A second Dutch force found a narrow passage leading up through the cliffs into the interior of the fortifications, but their attack was seen by Guillaume d'Orange – unable to use a musket due to old war-wounds, he threw down rocks at the Dutchmen; other soldiers and sailors hurried up to assist him, with Ensign de Martignac, the commander of the naval detachment, shooting repeatedly into the densely packed Dutch ranks at close range, aiming his shots to take down two men at a time. This fight came down to hand-to-hand combat, but the Dutch standard-bearer was killed and his war flag was captured, apparently by Captain Renart himself.

The Dutch retreated in some disarray, but in the afternoon, they renewed their attack. First, they tried to force the anchorage directly by sending in frigates to attack, but their advance was stopped by the sunken blockships, and their ships were caught in enfilade between the gun emplacements of the fortress on the west, and the broadsides of Les Jeux and Saint-Eustache in the sheltered inner harbour on the eastern side. When the ships retreated, the infantry attacked against the fortress again, but they found themselves under a devastating artillery fire: Captain Renart had brought Les Jeux close inshore to rake their advancing ranks with broadsides of grapeshot, and he had deployed the ship's six swivel guns in the fort, to fire directly into their attacking front. After several hours of unsuccessful attacks, Admiral de Ruyter gave the signal to retreat. The Dutch conceded between 1,000 and 1,300 killed or wounded.

The French had suffered only sixteen casualties in total, including their wounded, but they were short on ammunition, and they believed that the Dutch would soon renew their assault: Sainte-Marthe abandoned the fort, and ordered the ships to be burned. The remaining merchantmen were duly set alight, but Captain Renart decided to ignore the governor's orders for as long as possible, waiting anxiously aboard Les Jeux all night. Early in the morning, the lack of any evidence of activity around the Dutch beachhead prompted him to send his first officer to investigate: he discovered that the Dutch had withdrawn back to their ships during the hours of darkness and their fleet was already sailing away, leaving only a few of their casualties, too seriously injured to move, amid the dead, and a rout of abandoned weaponry and military equipment. The defending force had won a dramatic and unexpected victory.

== Aftermath ==
French historians still describe Martinique as an astounding military success: the great de Ruyter and the all-conquering Dutch navy had been defeated by a single frigate. Martinique would remain French. Captain Renart was rewarded with the grand noble title of Marquis d'Amblimont; he would later return to Fort-Royal as governor-general of the French Caribbean.

The humiliated Dutch fleet retreated back across the Atlantic, their combat losses compounded by the ravages of sickness. Their ambitions to expand their colonial empire in the Americas were permanently stalled, leaving them with only Surinam and the Dutch Antilles.

== Sources ==
- Charles Joseph Delahaut and Jean-Baptiste L'Écuy, Annales civiles et religieuses d'Yvois-Carinan et de Mouzon (Desoer and Delaunay: Paris, 1822).
- Alain Demerliac, La marine de Louis XIV. Nomenclature des vaisseaux du Roi-Soleil de 1661 à 1715 (Nice: Editions Omega, 1992).
- Léo Elisabeth, La Société martiniquaise aux XVIIe et XVIIIe siècles (Paris: Éditions Karthala 2003).
- David F. Marley, Wars of the Americas: A Chronology of Armed Conflict in the Western Hemisphere (2nd. ed., 2 vols., Santa Barbara, CA: ABC-CLIO, 2008).
- Abraham van der Moer, "Michiel Adriaenszoon de Ruyter: Ornament of His Age (1607–1676)", in The Great Admirals: Command at Sea, 1587–1945, ed. Jack Sweetman (Annapolis, MD: U.S. Naval Institute Press, 1997), pp. 82–111.
- Charles de la Ronciere, "L'attque du Fort-Royal de la Martinique par Ruyter (20 Juillet 1674)", Revue de l'histoire des colonies françaises, 7 (1919), pp. 35–46.
- Antonie Paul van Schilfgaarde, De Graven Van Limburg Stirum in Gelderland en de geschiedenis hunner bezittingen (3 vols., Assen: Van Gorcum, 1961).
- Michel Vergé-Francheschi, "Les gouvernerurs des colonies françaises au XVIIIe siècle. L'exemple antillais et canadie", in Les Européens et les espaces océaniques au XVIIIe siècle: actes du colloque de 1997, ed. François-Xavier Emmanuelli (Paris: Presses de l'université Paris Sorbonne, 1997), pp. 109–130.
- Pritchard, James (2004). In Search of Empire : The French in the Americas, 1670–1730. Cambridge University Press. ISBN 9780521827423.

=== Primary Sources ===
- Gerard Brandt, La vie de Michel de Ruyter, (Amsterdam: Blaeu, 1698).
- Eugène Bruneau-Latouche, ed., "Les défenseurs de la Martinique lors de l'attaque de Ruyter", G.H.C. Bulletin No. 92 (April 1997), pp. 1928–1942.
