= Charles Desnotz =

French naval officer

Charles, comte Desnotz

Governor general of the French Antilles
- In office 23 May 1701 – 6 October 1701
- Preceded by: Charles de Pechpeyrou-Comminges de Guitaut
- Succeeded by: Charles de Pechpeyrou-Comminges de Guitaut

Personal details
- Born: c. 1645
- Died: 6 October 1701 Martinique, Kingdom of France
- Occupation: Naval officer

Charles, comte Desnotz (or Desnots, des Nos, des Nots, d'Esnots; c. 1645 – 6 October 1701) was a French naval officer who was governor of Martinique in 1701 at the start of the War of the Spanish Succession. He died of yellow fever a few months after taking office.

== Family ==
Charles Desnotz (or des Nos) was born around 1645. The des Nos family was a knightly family of Breton origin that became established in Mayenne in the 17th century. Charles des Nos was the seigneur of Forbois, of Val in Larchamp and of Champrouzier in Saint-Pierre-des-Landes. His brother Gilles des Nos had a notable career in the naval armed forces and in 1720 became lieutenant general and commander in chief of all the South American seas.

== Early career ==
In 1692 Charles des Nos (1645-1701), Comte des Nos de Forbonest, was capitaine de vaisseau in command of the Soleil Royal. He participated in the action at Barfleur on 29 May 1692, when the Soleil Royal was the flagship of Admiral Anne Hilarion de Tourville. He was made a chevalier of the Order of Saint Louis. In 1694 he became a chef d'escadre des armées navales.

== Governor general of the French Antilles ==
Thomas-Claude Renart de Fuchsamberg Amblimont, governor and lieutenant general of the French Antilles, died of yellow fever in Martinique on 17 August 1700. Charles de Pechpeyrou-Comminges de Guitaut was made interim lieutenant general on 17 August 1700. Desnotz was named governor and lieutenant general on 1 January 1701 and was received in Martinique on 23 May 1701. François-Roger Robert was intendant, responsible for civil administration and justice, throughout Desnotz's term of office.

Desnotz made his residence in Fort Royal, Martinique. It was clear that a European war was imminent, since the Duke of Anjou had just become King Philip V of Spain, and the other powers of Europe would not allow one family to hold the crowns of France and Spain. (Note: The War of the Spanish Succession began in July 1701 and continued until August 1714.) The former governor Nicolas de Gabaret had installed the Saint-Nicolas battery to protect the bay of Saint-Pierre. Desnotz added eleven more cannons to the battery, and in the 18th century it was renamed the d'Esnotz Battery. In July he went to Guadeloupe to consult with Governor Charles Auger, and to urge him to immediately start preparations for war. He promised to give Auger all the assistance he needed.

Desnotz died of yellow fever in Martinique on 6 October 1701 and Guitaud was made interim lieutenant general for the fourth time. Desnotz was buried in the Fort Royal church. The marquis de Rosmadec was appointed to replace Desnotz, but died in Havana before taking office. Guitaud also died in September 1702 and was replaced as acting governor general by Nicolas de Gabaret. Eventually, on 24 March 1703, Desnotz was replaced by Charles-François de Machault de Belmont.

== Sources ==
- Angot, l'abbé Alphonse (1900–1910), Dictionnaire historique, topographique et biographique de la Mayenne (in French), ARCHIVES DÉPARTEMENTALES DE LA MAYENNE
- Baude, Théodore (1940), Fragments d'Histoire ou Hier et Aujord'hui à la faveur d'une promenade dans les rues et aux environs de Fort-de-France (PDF)
- Castex, Jean-Claude (2004), Dictionnaire des batailles navales franco-anglaises (in French), Presses Université Laval, ISBN 978-2-7637-8061-0
- Falkner, James (2015-10-30), The War of the Spanish Succession 1701-1714, Pen and Sword, ISBN 978-1-78159-031-7
- Labat, R.P. (1742), Nouveau voyage aux isles de l'Amerique ... (in French), vol. 7
- Lange, Jean-Pierre, "Saint-Pierre : les canons de la batterie d'Esnotz", La Martinique du Pirate (in French)
- Marcillac, Sidney Daney de (1846), Histoire de la Martinique: depuis la colonisation jusqu'en 1815 (in French), E. Ruelle
- Martineau, Alfred; May, L.-Ph. (1935), Trois siècles d'histoire antillaise : Martinique et Guadeloupe de 1635 à nos jours (in French), Paris: Librairie Leroux
- Pritchard, Pritchard, James S. (2004-01-22), In Search of Empire: The French in the Americas, 1670-1730, Cambridge University Press, ISBN 978-0-521-82742-3
- Renouard, Felix (1822), Statistique de la Martinique (in French), vol. 1
- Saint-Méry, Médéric Louis Élie Moreau de (1784), Loix et constitutions des colonies françoises de l'Amerique sous le vent... (in French), L'Auteur
- Villete-Mursay, Philippe de (1991), Mes campagnes de mer sous Louis XIV: avec un dictionnaire des personnages et des batailles, Broché
