= Nicolas de Gabaret =

French colonial official

Gabriel-Jean Nicolas Gabaret de Saint-Sornin

Governor of Grenada
- In office 1680–1689
- Preceded by: Jacques de Chambly
- Succeeded by: Louis Ancelin de Gemostat

Governor of Martinique
- In office 1689 – June 1711
- Preceded by: Claude de Roux de Saint-Laurent
- Succeeded by: Jean-Pierre de Charitte

Governor general of the French Antilles (acting)
- In office 17 September 1702 – 4 March 1703
- Preceded by: Charles de Pechpeyrou-Comminges de Guitaut
- Succeeded by: Charles-François de Machault de Belmont

Governor general of the French Antilles (acting)
- In office 7 January 1709 – 1710
- Preceded by: Charles-François de Machault de Belmont
- Succeeded by: Raymond Balthazar Phélypeaux

Governor of Saint-Domingue
- In office 24 May 1711 – 25 June 1712
- Preceded by: Laurent de Valernod
- Succeeded by: Paul-François de La Grange d'Arquian

Personal details
- Born: 18 August 1641 Saint-Martin-de-Ré, Charente-Maritime, France
- Died: 25 June 1712 (aged 70)
- Occupation: Colonial administrator

Gabriel-Jean Nicolas Gabaret de Saint-Sornin (18 August 1641 – 25 June 1712) was a French colonial official who was governor of Grenada in the French West Indies, and then for over twenty years was governor of Martinique. He was deputy to the governor general of the French Antilles, and was twice acting governor general of the French Antilles. In his last year he was governor of Saint-Domingue.

== Early years ==
Gabriel-Jean Nicolas Gabaret was born on 18 August 1641 in Saint-Martin-de-Ré, on the Île de Ré then part of Aunis. His parents were Mathurin Gabaret (1602–1671), a lieutenant general of the marine army and Marie Baron. On 10 April 1673 he married Marie-Anne Grassineau des Enfrais des Essarts in La Rochelle, Charente-Maritime. They had seven children. Through his marriage he became seigneur of Saint-Sornin^{(fr)} in the department of Vendée. Their son, also Gabriel-Jean-Nicolas de Gabaret, inherited the chateau of Saint-Sornin.

== Governor of Grenada ==
Gabaret was appointed the king's governor of Grenada in 1680. Gabaret was a shareholder in the Mouillage sugar refinery on Martinique, as was the marquis de Maintenon. By 1683 they were both being named in complaints about illegal trade in the islands. One common approach was to load sugar in Martinique, declare the amount being exported to the local customs official, sail to the English part of Saint Christopher island and sell it, then replace it with sugar from the French part of the island and continue to France. The king knew of the illegal trade but could do nothing to enforce the laws.

== Governor of Martinique ==
In July 1689 the king made Charles de Pechpeyrou-Comminges de Guitaut governor of Saint Christopher Island and gave him the position of lieutenant general of the American islands, which had been vacated by the death of Claude de Roux de Saint-Laurent. On 16 June 1689 Louis XIV made Gabaret governor of Martinique in place of Guitaut. Gabaret installed the Saint-Nicolas battery to protect the bay of Saint-Pierre. (Note: The governor general of the Antilles Charles Desnotz later added eleven more cannons to the Saint-Nicolas battery, and in the 18th century it was renamed the Esnotz Battery.)

In 1693 Gabaret and the governor general Charles de Courbon de Blénac repulsed the English when they attempted invasion with a force of 4,000 men. The English expedition under Admiral Francis Wheler had 15 warships 3 fire ships, 28 transports and almost 2,000 soldiers, to which Barbados added another 1,000 men. Gabaret was prepared to defend Saint Pierre against the English, but on 11 April 1693 they bypassed the town and continued to the undefended Cul-de-Sac Marin in the southeast of the island. The English took control of a large area with little opposition. English reinforcements under Captain General Christopher Codrington arrived within two weeks, but the combined force did not engage in serious fighting. The English took 3,000 black slaves, valued at £60,000. They made an ineffective attack on Saint Pierre, then left the island. Gabaret was made a chevalier of the Order of Saint Louis in 1701.

== Acting governor general ==
Charles de Pechpeyrou-Comminges de Guitaut, the acting lieutenant governor of the Antilles, died on 7 September 1702. On 17 September 1702 Gabaret was appointed acting lieutenant governor pending the arrival of Charles-François de Machault de Belmont, who was received in Martinique on 4 March 1703.

During the War of the Spanish Succession, on 6 March 1703 an English fleet of 45 vessels carrying 4,000 soldiers and militia arrived off Guadeloupe, which the governor Charles Auger tried to defend against the superior English forces. In late March Machault de Bellemont arrived in Martinique bringing the promotion of Gabaret to second in command of the Antilles (lieutenant du roi au gouvernement général) in place of Guitaut. He found the intendant Robert gathering reinforcements for Guadeloupe. Gabaret reached Guadeloupe with the reinforcements on 3 April 1703 and took command of the defense. His aides de camp were Bonnaventure-François de Boisfermé, governor of Marie-Galante, and two of the king's lieutenants Louis Gaston de Cacqueray de Valmenier and Jean Clair Dyel Du Parquet. Gabaret adopted scorched earth tactics in Guadeloupe, destroying resources before falling back from the invaders into the interior, then harassing them while disease, drink and lack of food reduced their strength. Gabaret's cautious approach gave the English time to cause great damage to the island. The destruction of property was highly unpopular with the planters. It had its effect. The English withdrew their troops on 15 May 1703 and sailed away three days later.

Machault died in Martinique on 7 January 1709. Gabaret was again appointed acting governor general.

== Last years ==
Raymond Balthazar Phélypeaux was appointed governor and lieutenant general of the French islands and mainland, and was received in Martinique on 3 January 1711. Phélypeaux found that Gabaret had allowed the forts and batteries of Martinique to be abandoned for two years. He had work started on restoring the defenses, and when Gabaret opposed his orders he suspended him on 27 April 1711. Gabaret died after he was named governor of Saint Domingue in reward for his services. He died in Saint Domingue on 25 June 1712.

== Sources ==
- Arbanère, Fabien, Gabriel-Jean "Nicolas I" Gabaret de Saint-Sornin (in Spanish)
- d'Aspect, M. (1780), Histoire de l'Ordre royal et militaire de St-Louis (in French), Duchesne
- Dangeau, Marquis de (1854), Journal du marquis de Dangeau publié en entier pour la première fois par mm. Soulié ... [et al.]: 1687–1689 (in French), F. Didot freres
- Dessalles, Adrien (1847b), Histoire politique et commerciale des Antilles ... traitant des evenements survenus aux Antilles, sous le regne de Louis XV. Extraits de ses lettres aux gouverneurs-generaux des iles et aux intendants (in French), vol. 2, France
- Dessalles, Pierre Régis (1847c), Histoire legislative des Antilles ou Annales du conseil souverain de la Martinique (etc.) (in French), vol. 3, France
- G. de C. (1876), "Les Familles Rochelaises", Revue de Saintonge & d'Aunis. Bulletin de la Société des Archives Historique .., Paris: Saintes
- Lange, Jean-Pierre, "Saint-Pierre : les canons de la batterie d'Esnotz", La Martinique du Pirate (in French)
- Marcillac, Sidney Daney de (1846), Histoire de la Martinique: depuis la colonisation jusqu'en 1815 (in French), E. Ruelle
- Marley, David (2005), Historic Cities of the Americas: An Illustrated Encyclopedia, ABC-CLIO, ISBN 978-1-57607-027-7
- Morgan, William Thomas (September 1930), "The British West Indies during King William's War (1689-97)", The Journal of Modern History, 2 (3), The University of Chicago Press: 378–409, doi:10.1086/235621, JSTOR 1898817, S2CID 144978109
- Pritchard, Pritchard, James S. (2004-01-22), In Search of Empire: The French in the Americas, 1670–1730, Cambridge University Press, ISBN 978-0-521-82742-3
- R.B. (1859), "Vice-Rois et Lieutenants Generaux des Rois de France en Amerique", Mémoires de la Société historique de Montréal (in French), La Société
- Saint-Méry, Médéric Louis Élie Moreau de (1784), Loix et constitutions des colonies françoises de l'Amerique sous le vent... (in French), L'Auteur
