= Le Bas =

Le Bas is a surname. Notable people with the name include:

- Charles Webb Le Bas (1779–1861), English clergyman
- Damian Le Bas (born 1963), British artist
- Damian Le Bas (writer) (born 1985), British writer and journalist
- Delaine Le Bas (born 1965), British artist
- Edward Le Bas (1904–1966), British artist and collector
- Élisabeth Le Bas (1772–1859), French revolutionary and memoirist
- Hedley Le Bas (1868–1962), British publisher
- Jacques-Philippe Le Bas (1707–1783), French engraver
- Jessica Le Bas New Zealand poet
- Michael Le Bas (1916-1988), Fighter Pilot and Air Vice Marshall RAF
- Molly Le Bas (1903–1996), British sculptor
- Philippe Le Bas (1794–1860), French hellenist
- Philippe-François-Joseph Le Bas (1764–1794), French revolutionary
