= Robert Cloche de La Malmaison =

French soldier and colonial administrator

Georges Robert Cloche de Mont-Saint-Rémy de La Malmaison

Governor of Guadeloupe
- In office 1 November 1705 – 1 May 1717
- Preceded by: Bonnaventure-François de Boisfermé
- Succeeded by: Savinien-Michel de Lagarrigue de Savigny

Governor of the French Windward Islands (interim)
- In office 21 October 1713 – 2 January 1715
- Preceded by: Raymond Balthazar Phélypeaux
- Succeeded by: Abraham Duquesne-Guitton

Personal details
- Died: 1 May 1717

Georges Robert Cloche de Mont-Saint-Rémy de La Malmaison (died 1 May 1717) was a French soldier and colonial administrator who was governor of Guadeloupe from 1705 until his death in 1717. In 1713–15 he was acting governor general of the French Antilles

== Early years (to 1684) ==
Robert Cloche, squire, sieur of La Malmaison, was from a family from Nancy, Lorraine, ennobled by Charles III, Duke of Lorraine on 12 August 1596. His father was Georges Cloche, a prosecutor of the king and then a lawyer in the Élection d'Épernay, part of the Généralité de Châlons in the province of Champagne. He was an officer in the Picardy regiment.

== King's lieutenant in Guadeloupe (1684–1705) ==
Pierre Hincelin was governor of Guadeloupe from 5 July 1677 until 1694, when he was replaced by Charles Auger. On 19 September 1684 La Malmaison was appointed king's lieutenant in Guadeloupe. He became a knight of the Order of Saint Louis. He brought two of his nephews to Guadeloupe, George and Nicolas, sons of his younger brother George.

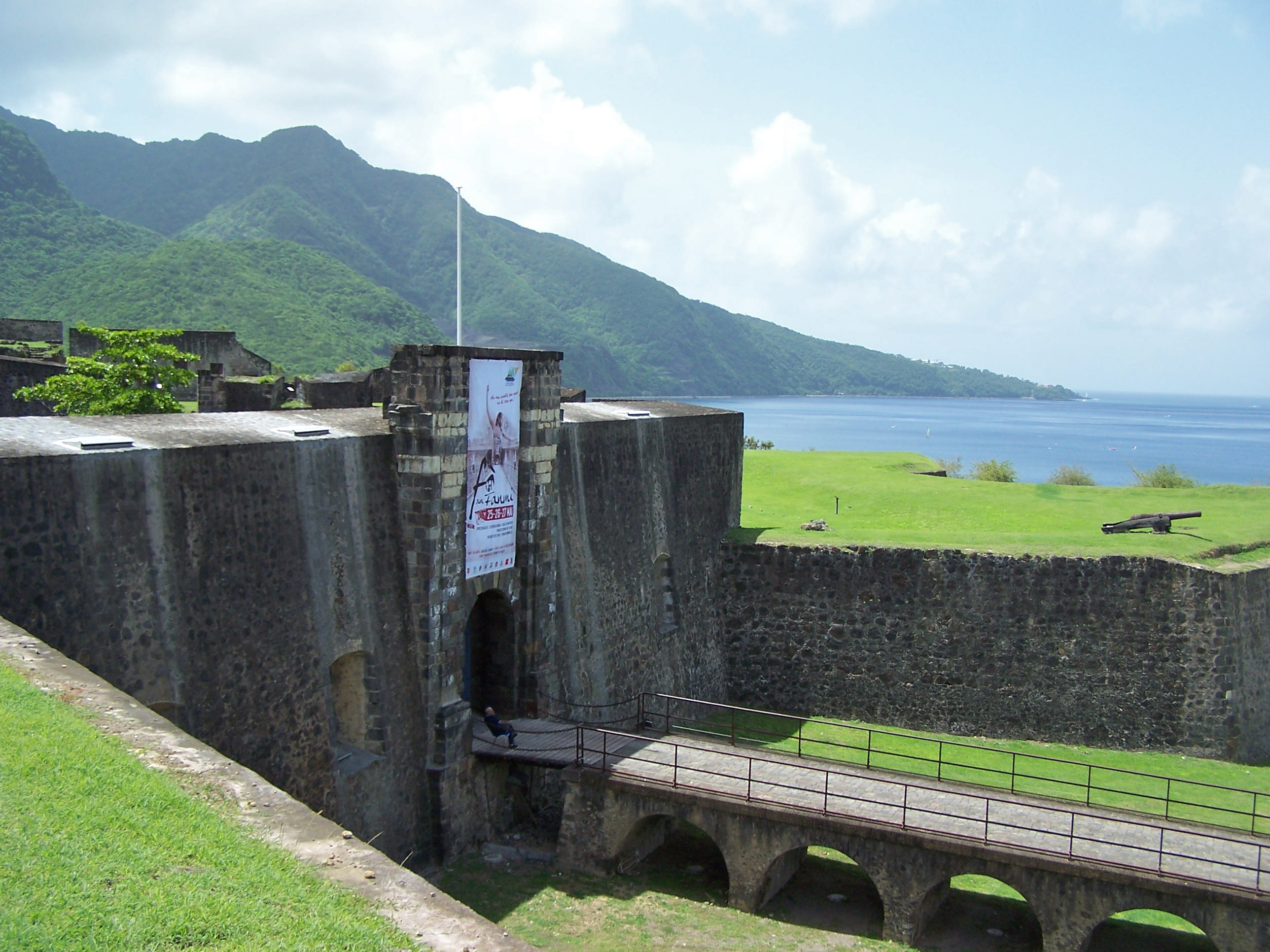
Entrance to Fort Saint-Charles, Basse-Terre

During the Nine Years' War (1688–97) the governor general of the Windward Islands Charles de Courbon de Blénac resigned on 29 January 1690 after criticism of his lack of response to the English attacks on Saint Barthelemy, Marie-Galante and Saint Martin, and returned to France to defend himself at court. François d'Alesso d'Éragny was appointed his successor in May 1690, but the marquis de Seignelay did not treat his departure as a matter of urgency. D'Eragny arrived in Martinique on 5 February 1691 with 14 ships and began to strengthen the defenses.

At the end of May 1691 the English under Christopher Codrington, who had taken Marie-Galante, appeared off Guadeloupe. Governor Hincelin was suffering from severe hydropsy, which limited his mobility, and retired into the interior. 400 men under La Malmaison as king's lieutenant delayed the English for a day before being forced back. The French troops retreated into Fort Saint-Charles^{(fr)} and were besieged there by the English. La Malmaison led the resistance of the fort at Basse-Terre for 36 days, when d'Eragny arrived in Guadeloupe with a force of buccaneers and other troops, at which Codrington hastily reembarked leaving behind cannons and some of his wounded.

By early 1701 it was clear that another European war was imminent, since the Duke of Anjou had just become King Philip V of Spain, and the other powers of Europe would not allow one family to hold the crowns of France and Spain. (Note: The War of the Spanish Succession began in July 1701 and continued until August 1714.) In July 1701 the governor general of the French West Indies, Charles Desnotz, came to Guadeloupe to consult with governor Charles Auger, and to urge him to immediately start preparations for war. La Malmaison was commander of Guadeloupe in the absence of the governor in 1701 and 1702.

Islands in the Lesser Antilles

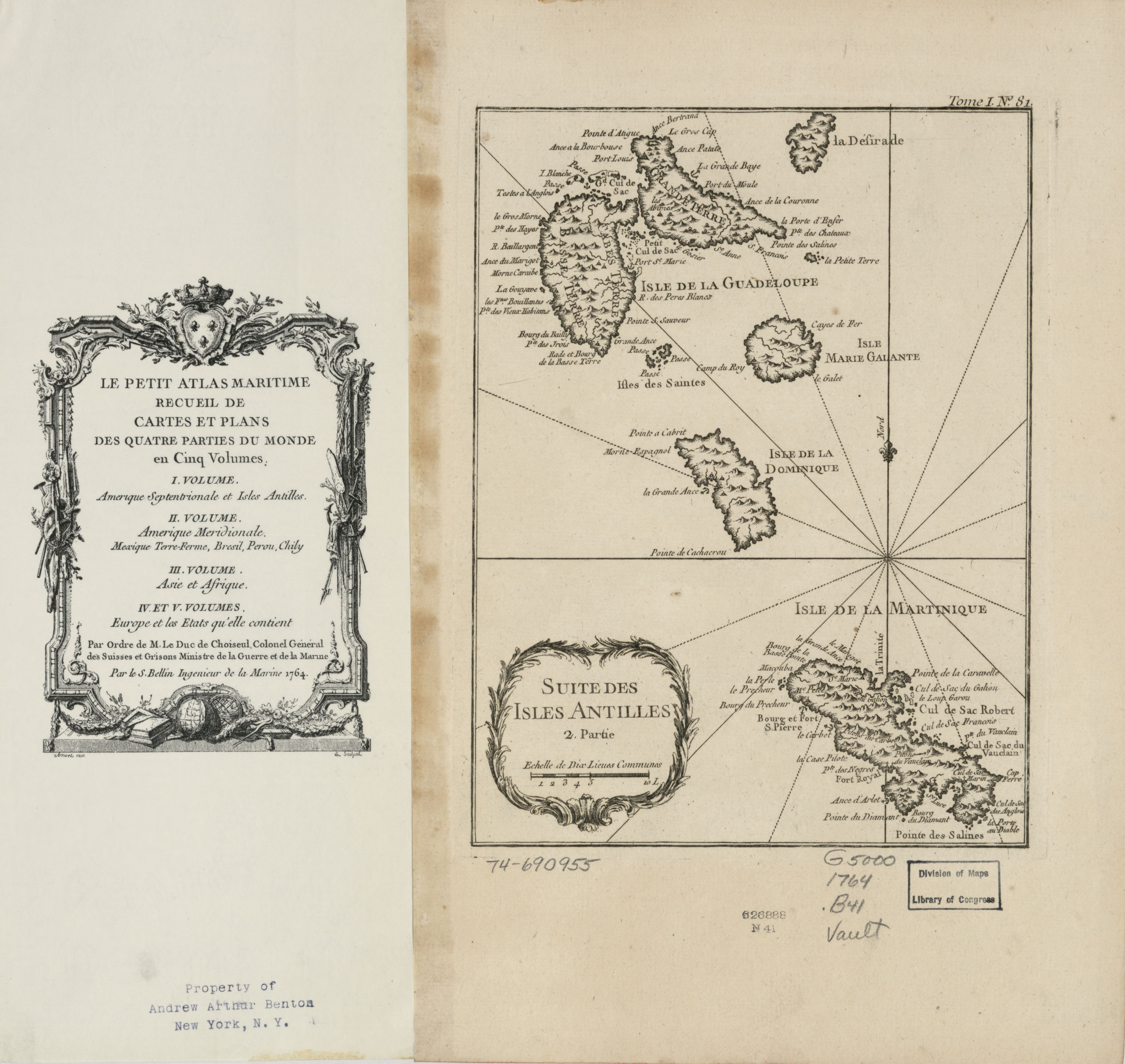
Guadeloupe, Dominica and Martinique

On 19 March 1703 an English invasion fleet under Hovenden Walker and Christopher Codrington (Note: The Christopher Codrington who led the troops in the 1703 invasion of Guadeloupe was the son of the Christopher Codrington who led the 1691 invasion.) was sighted off the south of Guadeloupe. Over the next few days the English disembarked over 4,000 troops at three landing points. La Malmaison was second in command to Governor Auger. Their 1,400 French militiamen were forced back to Fort Saint Charles in Basse-Terre. On 3 April 1703 a French fleet arrived under Jean Gabaret, lieutenant general for the French Antilles, with 820 men from Martinique. The subordinate commanders included Bonnaventure-François de Boisfermé, Louis Gaston Caquery de Valmenière, Jean Clair Dyel Du Parquet, François de Collart and Jean Du Buc. An attempt to hold Fort Francis failed, and the French were forced to the east. The English left Guadeloupe on 15 May 1703 after causing great material damage but few French casualties.

== Governor of Guadeloupe (1705–17) ==
La Malmaison was governor and lieutenant general of Guadeloupe from 1 November 1705 until his death on 1 May 1717. (Note: A list of governors of Guadeloupe is given at the end of the Archives nationales inventory published in 1984 under the direction of Marie Antoinette Menier. It incorrectly says the governor from 1704 was Hémon Coinard de Malaison, king's lieutenant. In fact the governor was Robert Cloche, sieur de Malmaison. The list also misses Antoine Philippe comte de Lardenoy, governor from 1816 to 1822.) He replaced Bonnaventure-François de Boisfermé, acting governor of Guadeloupe. He also replaced Joseph d'Honon de Galiffet (died 1706), who had been appointed governor of Guadeloupe in 1703 but had not taken office. One of his first acts was to expel the English from the neighboring island of Marie-Galante.

A letter from the Secretary of the Navy of 3 October 1708 discussed militia appointments and other military matters, and reprimanded him for his violence against M. Du Boucher, negligence in defense of the island and interference in the judicial field. A letter of 29 November 1709 discussed the arrival in Guadeloupe of M. de Valmeinière, insubordination of the colony's officers, fortifications proposed by the Sieur Binois, cannons that had been sent him, privateering rules, supply of slaves, arguments he had with the Sieur Du Bouchet, relations with the island's council, organization of militias, lack of religious services at Fort Saint-Louis and other subjects. A letter of 4 April 1712 discussed the arrival of ships carrying supplies, repression of foreign trade, construction of the church at Fort Saint-Louis, the failed attack by the English on Canada in September 1710 and other matters.

A letter from the Secretary of State of the Navy dated 28 January 1713 discussed subjects such as the slave trade, defense of Guadeloupe, marriage of young men, trade and the visit of Raymond Balthazar Phélypeaux, governor and lieutenant general of the French islands and mainland of America. It authorized La Malmaison to assume governorship of the Windward Islands in the event of the absence or death of Phélypeaux. Phélypeaux died on 21 October 1713, and La Malmaison became interim governor of the American islands. He arrived in Martinique on 8 January 1714. On 1 January 1714 the Marquis Abraham Duquesne-Guitton was appointed governor and lieutenant general of the French Windward islands. He was received in Martinique on 2 January 1715.

La Malmaison died on 1 May 1717. He was succeeded in May 1717 by Savinien-Michel de Lagarrigue de Savigny as interim governor.

== Sources ==
- Cahoon, Ben, "Guadeloupe", Worldstatesmen.org
- Falkner, James (2015-10-30), The War of the Spanish Succession 1701-1714, Pen and Sword, ISBN 978-1-78159-031-7
- Lacour, Auguste (1855), Histoire de la Guadeloupe (in French), E. Kolodziej
- La Malmaison (Georges Robert Cloche de Mont-Saint-Rémy de), lieutenant de roi à la Guadeloupe, commandant en l'absence du gouverneur (in French), iREL: Archives nationales
- Marcillac, Sidney Daney de (1846), Histoire de la Martinique: depuis la colonisation jusqu'en 1815 (in French), E. Ruelle
- Marley, David (1998), Wars of the Americas: A Chronology of Armed Conflict in the New World, 1492 to the Present, ABC-CLIO, ISBN 978-0-87436-837-6
- Marley, David (2005), Historic Cities of the Americas: An Illustrated Encyclopedia, ABC-CLIO, ISBN 978-1-57607-027-7
- Peyreleau, Eugène-Édouard Boyer (1823), Les Antilles françaises, particulièrement la Guadeloupe, depuis leur découverte jusqu'au 1er janvier 1823 (in French), Brissot-Thivars
- Pritchard, James S. (2004-01-22), In Search of Empire: The French in the Americas, 1670-1730, Cambridge University Press, ISBN 978-0-521-82742-3
- Rossignol, Bernadette; Rossignol, Philippe (February 2004), Généalogie et Histoire de la Caraïbe (in French)
- Saint-Méry, Médéric Louis Élie Moreau de (1784b), Loix et constitutions des colonies françoises de l'Amerique sous le vent (in French), vol. 2 1704–1721
- Secrétariat d'État à la Marine (3 October 1708), A monsieur de La Malmaison au sujet des violences ... (in French)
- Secrétariat d'État à la Marine (29 November 1709), A monsieur de La Malmaison au sujet de l'arrivée ... (in French)
- Secrétariat d'État à la Marine (4 April 1712), A monsieur de La Malmaison au sujet de l'arrivée de navires... (in French)
- Secrétariat d'État à la Marine (28 January 1713), A monsieur de La Malmaison au sujet de l'entreprise de Cassard ... (in French)
