= Joseph d'Honon de Gallifet =

French aristocrat and colonial administrator

Governor of Saint-Domingue (acting)
- In office July 1700 – 16 December 1703
- Preceded by: Jean-Baptiste du Casse
- Succeeded by: Charles Auger

Governor of Guadeloupe (absent)
- In office 1703–1706
- Preceded by: Bonnaventure-François de Boisfermé (acting)
- Succeeded by: Robert Cloche de La Malmaison

Personal details
- Born: Provence, France
- Died: 1706
- Parent(s): Pierre II d'Honon de Galliffet; Marguerite de Bonfils
- Relatives: Alexandre de Galliffet (brother); Philippe de Galliffet (brother)
- Occupation: Colonial administrator

Joseph d'Honon de Gallifet (died 1706) was a French aristocrat and colonial administrator. He served as the governor of Saint-Domingue (now Haiti) from 1700 to 1703, and the Governor of Guadeloupe from 1703 to 1706. Gallifet dealt with the reality of buccaneers as soon as he arrived in Saint-Domingue.
