= List of colonial and departmental heads of Marie-Galante =

Governor of Marie-Galante
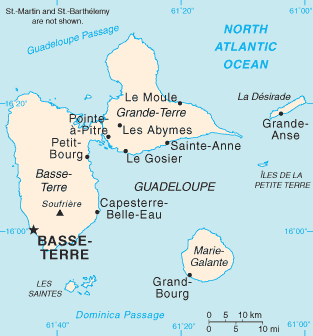
- Guadeloupe (NW) and Marie-Galante (SE)
- Ministry of the Navy and Colonies
- Type: Island
- Seat: Basseterre, Saint-Christophe (1628–71)
- Formation: 1628 (1st time); March 1849 (second time)
- First holder: Jacques de Boisseret
- Final holder: Dominique Murat
- Abolished: 23 March 1794 (1st time); November 1851 (2nd time)

Marie-Galante is an island in the Leeward Islands. From 1648 to 1749 Marie-Galante was administered by a French governor or royal lieutenant, who often reported to the governor of nearby Guadeloupe, or by the governor of Guadeloupe directly.

== Origins ==
The island was discovered by Christopher Columbus on 3 November 1493, and claimed for Spain with the name Santa Maria la Galante. On 8 November 1648 France incorporated the island into the Guadeloupe administration. Jacques de Boisseret leased the island from the king of France from 4 September 1649 to 1643. His widow abandoned her claim in 1660.

== Administrators ==
The administrators of Marie-Galante were:

Period	Administrator	Notes
4 September 1649 – 1653	Jacques de Boisseret (died 1653)	
1653–55	Madeleine Houël de Boisseret (1613–1655)	
1670–77	Jacques de Boisseret de Thémericourt (died 1677)	
1679–86	Charles François d'Angennes, Marquis de Maintenon (1648–1691)	
1 January 1686 – 1695	Charles Auger	
1692–95	(vacant)	Marie-Galante was abandoned in 1692 due to English raids.
1695–96	M. de Laurière (died 1696)	
1 September 1696 – 8 November 1702	Bonnaventure-François de Boisfermé	Governor
1703–06	(vacant)	Taken by the English
1 August 1714 – 1 December 1722	Bonnaventure-François de Boisfermé	2nd time; Commander
23 August 1714 – 1723	Charles de Brunier, Marquis de Larnage (1687–1746)	Royal lieutenant
June 1723 – 1724	Ravary (died 1724)	Royal lieutenant
1724–25	Robert Philippe de Longvilliers de Poincy (c. 1671 –1761)	1st time; acting
1725–26	La Chassagne	Acting
March 1726 – 1729	Pierre Le Bègue (died 1729)	
1729–48	Robert Philippe de Longvilliers de Poincy	2nd time
1748? – 1752?	Joseph de Jarrier de La Chassaigne	Royal Lieutenant; 1st time
15 February 1752 – 1759	Nicolas Baptiste des Merliers de Longueville (1688–1761)	
1759 – 26 May 1759	Joseph de Jarrier de La Chassaigne	2nd time; acting
1759–63	Francis Maclean (c. 1717? –1781)	
1763–76	Marc Étienne de Joubert (1716–1784)	Local governor
1777 – August 1779	Pierre-Joseph de Neyon de Villiers (1718–1780)	Local governor
1779 – 27 June 1785	Auguste Lescuiller Descoudrelles (died 1785)	Local governor
1785? – 1790	Jean Étienne de Ségur d'Aguesseau (1731–1789)	Local governor
1790 – 1 Nov 1792	Emmanuel-Joseph Desnoyers (1733–c.1798)	Local governor
1 November 1792 – 20 April 1794	Deshayes (or Deshaies) & Dominique Murat (1742–1819)	Presidents of the Commission (Comité des Douze or République des Douze)

The island was occupied by the British in 1794, and after this no longer had an independent administrator

== See also ==
- List of colonial and departmental heads of Guadeloupe
- List of governors general of the French Antilles

== Sources ==
- Laprise, Raynald (2000–2006), "AUGER, le chevalier Charles", Figures de Proue : un dictionnaire biographique de la flibuste, Le Diable Volant
