= Miguet =

- Nicolas Miguet (born 1961), French journalist, businessman and politician.
- Robert Miguet (born 1929), French civil servant (prefect).
