= General Dalrymple =

General Dalrymple may refer to:

- Adolphus Dalrymple (1784–1866), British Army general
- Campbell Dalrymple (1725–1767), British Army brigadier general
- Hew Whitefoord Dalrymple (1750–1830), British Army general
- John Dalrymple, 2nd Earl of Stair (1673–1747), British Army general
- John Hamilton Elphinstone Dalrymple (1819–1888), British Army general
- William Dalrymple (British Army officer) (1736–1807), British Army major general
