= Claude François du Lyon =

Claude François du Lyon, seigneur de Poinson et Poinsenot

Governor of Guadeloupe
- In office 4 November 1664 – 14 September 1674
- Preceded by: Charles Houël du Petit Pré
- Succeeded by: Pierre Hincelin

Personal details
- Born: c. 1633
- Died: 14 September 1674 Guadeloupe
- Occupation: Soldier

Claude François du Lyon (or Dulion, Dulyon etc. (Note: The family name is variously spelled Du Lyon, Dulion, Dulyon, Du Lion, Lyon, Delyon and de Lyon.); 1633 ? – 14 September 1674) was a squire of the King, Sieur de Poinson et Poinsenot and Governor of Guadeloupe from 1664 to 1668 on behalf of the French West India Company.

== Family background ==
The Du Lyon family was of the provincial nobility of the sword, with property on the border of Champagne and Burgundy. It can be traced to Hubert Du Lyon, squire and officer of the Duke of Burgundy in 1315. Jean Du Lyon, squire, was in charge of the fortifications of Dijon. His father was René du Lyon, squire, seigneur of Poinson and Poinsenot, a notary of Chaumont. His mother was Claire Sauvage, daughter of Nicolas Sauvage, adviser of the court of Chaumont. Claude François Du Lyon was squire, seigneur of Poinson and Poinsonot, maintained of nobility in November 1668 by M. de Caumartin, steward of Champagne. He was appointed an ordinary gentleman of the king's chamber and inspector of the armies of Flanders and Italy.

== Governor of Guadeloupe ==
Islands in the Lesser Antilles

Claude François Du Lyon was the first governor of Guadeloupe for the French West India Company (Compagnie des Indes Occidentales). Governor general Alexandre de Prouville de Tracy arrived in Guadeloupe on 23 June 1664. He informed the governor Charles Houël du Petit Pré that the king had ordered his recall. Houël left for France on 4 July 1664. The next day Tracy abolished all the duties that Houel had imposed. Houël's nephews d'Herblay and Téméricourt left the island for France on 12 July 1664. Tracy then replaced the garrisons of the three forts on the island with the king's men. He let Pierre Hincelin, commander of the Basse-Terre fort, take care of the interests of his brother-in-law Houël, and gave Du Lyon command of this fort. Tracy appointed des Roses governor of Marie-Galante. Tracy made Du Lyon provisional governor of Guadeloupe and left for Grenada on 5 November 1664.

Du Lyon's second wife Claire Tabourot followed him to Guadeloupe. In March 1665 he was confirmed as governor of Guadeloupe for the king and the company. After Tracy had left for Canada, disturbances broke out in Martinique in 1665. Martinique governor Robert de Clodoré and the company's general agent de Chambré were unable to restore peace, and called on Du Lyon to send help in the form of several companies under his lieutenant Hincelin. The disturbances were over before this force arrived. Du Lyon appears to have been a capable administrator and active in military affairs. He was wounded during an attack on the English in Antigua.

In 1669 the government of Guadeloupe was joined to that of Martinique until 1677, when Pierre Hincelin became governor for the king. The governor-general Jean-Charles de Baas took office on 4 February 1669. De Baas was critical of Du Lyon, but this may be because he consistently claimed that the government of Guadeloupe was independent of that of Martinique. A letter has been preserved in the Naval Archives dated 1 May 1672 reproaching Du Lyon for his endless quarrels with de Baaz, and there is another dated 23 March 1674. Du Lyon died on 14 September 1674. Three months later the company was suppressed.

== Wives and children ==
In 1653 Du Lyon married Madeleine du Val, daughter of Edmé du Val, Lord of Mouilleron, Rivières, Mornay and Nizy. They had two children:

- César Saladin du Lyon (Note: There is a marriage contract of César Saladin du Lyon dated 28 October 1691 with Dame Marguerite de Saint Mathieu widow of Messire César de Campet de Saujon and daughter of Elie de Saint Mathieu and Marie Baron. César Saladin du Lyon was named squire, lord of Poinson and Poinsenot and Rivière les Fosses, king's lieutenant on his warships in the department of Rochefort, native of Rivière in the diocese of Langres in Champagne. His witness was his cousin François Fleutelot, esquire, lord of Rompré, lieutenant maintained for the service of the King on His Majesty's ships at the port of Rochefort. César Saladin died in March 1693 without descendants (his name was spelled "du Lion" in the document))
- Claire Pierrette du Lyon.

On 15 September 1663 at the seigneurial house of Véronnes he married Claire Tabourot, daughter of Alexandre Tabourot, Seigneur of Véronnes and Lieutenant General of Water and Forests of Burgundy. Six children were born to this union:

- Charles Albert du Lyon (abbé)
- Claire Christine Marie Anne du Lyon
- Claude du Lyon, king's Lieutenant de vaisseau
- Christine du Lyon, nun of the Abbey of Parc-aux-Dames^{(fr)} in 1719, then abbess in Provins in 1730
- François du Lyon, captain of a compagnie franche of the navy, Enseigne de vaisseau, captain of the islands in 1680 and major of Guadeloupe in 1691
- Claude Antoine du Lyon, naval guard, lieutenant in Martinique in 1691, Enseigne de vaisseau in 1693 then Captain of Saint-Domingue in 1695.

== Sources ==
- Boyer Peyreleau, Eugène-Édouard (1823), Les Antilles françaises, particulièrement la Guadeloupe, depuis leur découverte jusqu'au 1er janvier 1823 (in French), Brissot-Thivars
- Martineau, Alfred; May, L.-Ph. (1935), Trois siècles d'histoire antillaise : Martinique et Guadeloupe de 1635 à nos jours (in French), Paris: Librairie Leroux
- Rossignol, Philippe; Rossignol, Bernadette (April 1995), "Famille DU LYON (Champagne, Bourgogne, Guadeloupe)", Généalogie et Histoire de la Caraïbe (G.H.C.) (in French) (70)
