= List of colonial and departmental heads of Guadeloupe =

(Dates in italics indicate de facto continuation of office)

Note: currently, the prefect is not the true departmental head, which is the President of the General Council. The prefect is merely the representative of the national government.

== Ancien regime ==
Governors under the Ancien Régime were:

Term	Incumbent	Notes
French Suzerainty
28 June 1635 – 4 December 1635	Jean du Plessis d'Ossonville	Died 1635
28 June 1635 – 1640	Charles Liènard de l'Olive	Governor; died 1643
25 November 1640 – 1643	Jean Aubert	
1643–1664	Charles Houël du Petit Pré	Governor
August 1644 – May 1645	Marivet	Acting
8 July 1654 – 1656	Charles Houël du Petit Pré	2nd time, acting, also de Boisseret
23 June 1664 – November 1664	Ducoudray	Acting
5 November 1664 – 14 September 1674	Claude François du Lyon	
1677	M. de Baas de l'Herpinière	Did not take office
5 July 1677 – 15 June 1695	Pierre Hincelin	Acting, then confirmed governor
15 July 1695 to 1702	Charles Auger	Governor
1703–1705	Joseph d'Honon de Gallifet	Did not take office
1702–1705	Bonnaventure-François de Boisfermé	Acting governor for absent Galiffet
1706 – 1 May 1717	Robert Cloche de La Malmaison	Governor
May 1717 to 18 March 1718	Savinien-Michel de Lagarrigue de Savigny	Interim governor
22 June 1717	François de Pas de Mazencourt, marquis de Feuquières	Did not take office
June/July 1719 – October 1727	Alexandre Vaultier, comte de Moyencourt	Governor
21 October 1727 – 27 July 1734	Robert Giraud du Poyet	Governor
27 July 1734 – 17 August 1737	Charles de Brunier, marquis de Larnage	Acting governor
17 August 1737 – 1753	Gabriel de Clieu	Governor
October 1749 – December 1750	de Lafond	Acting for d'Erchigny)
27 December 1753 – 1757	Jean Antoine Joseph de Mirabeau	Governor
15 January 1757 – 1 May 1759	Charles François Emmanuel Nadau du Treil	Governor
British Suzerainty
May 1759	John Barrington	
May 1759 – 11 March 1760	Byam Crump	Governor
March 1760 – 4 July 1763	Campbell Dalrymple	Governor
French Suzerainty
4 July 1763 – 24 June 1764	François-Charles de Bourlamaque	Governor
1764 to 1765	Henri Édouard de Copley	Interim governor
20 March 1765 to 29 November 1768	Pierre Gédéon de Nolivos	Governor
29 November 1768 – 1769	Anne Joseph Hippolyte de Maurès de Malartic	Governor
27 February 1769 – 1771	François Claude Amour, marquis de Bouillé	Governor
August 1771 to 1773	Louis François de Dion	Governor
14 April 1773 – 1776	Édouard Hilaire Louis de Tilly	Governor
1776–1782	Bache-Elzéar-Alexandre d'Arbaud de Jouques	Governor
16 Nov 1782 – 1783	Claude Charles de Marillac, vicomte de Damas	Governor
1783–1784	Beaumé de la Saulais	Governor
1784 – 25 July 1792	Charles François de Clugny de Thénissey	Governor

== Revolution and First Empire ==
Term	Incumbent	Notes
1792 to 1793	René Marie, vicomte d'Arrot, interim Governor	
5 January 1793 to 18 March 1793	Jean-Baptiste Raymond de Lacrosse, provisional Governor	
18 March 1793 to 20 April 1794	Victor Collot, Governor	
British Suzerainty
20 April 1794 to 3 June 1794	Thomas Dundas, Governor	
French Suzerainty
7 June 1794 to 6 January 1795	Victor Hugues, Commissioner	
6 January 1795 to January 1796	Victor Hugues, Co-Commissioner	
6 January 1795 to January 1796	Lebas, Co-Commissioner	
6 January 1795 to June 1795	Goyrand, Co-Commissioner	
January 1796 to 25 October 1797	Victor Hugues, Agent of the French Executive Directory	
January 1796 to 25 October 1797	Lebas, Agent of the French Executive Directory	
25 October 1797 to 19 April 1801	Département	
25 October 1797 to 22 November 1798	Victor Hugues, Agent of the French Executive Directory	Co-Agent
25 October 1797 to 22 November 1798	Lebas, Agent of the French Executive Directory	Co-Agent
22 November 1798 to 3 October 1799	Edme Étienne Borne-Desfourneaux, Agent of the French Executive Directory	
3 October 1799 to 11 December 1799	Paris, provisional Agent of the French Executive Directory	
11 December 1799 to 30 May 1801	Georges Nicolas Jeannet-Oudin, Agent of the French Executive Directory	Co-Agent
11 December 1799 to 30 December 1800	René Gaston Baco de la Chapelle, Agent of the French Executive Directory	Co-Agent
11 December 1799 to 28 February 1800	Étienne Maynaud de Bizefranc de Laveaux, Agent of the French Executive Directory	Co-Agent
28 February 1800 to 30 May 1801	Maurice-Henri Bresseau	Co-Agent
30 May 1801 to 14 May 1802	Jean-Baptiste Raymond de Lacrosse, Captain-General	1st Term
24 October 1801 to 6 May 1802	Magloire Pélage, President of Provisional Council of Government	In rebellion
14 May 1802 to 3 September 1802	Antoine Richepanse, Captain-General	
4 August 1802 to 8 May 1803	Jean-Baptiste Raymond de Lacrosse, Captain-General	
4 August 1802 to 3 September 1802	Jean-Baptiste Raymond de Lacrosse, Captain-General	2nd Term
3 September 1802 to 8 May 1803	Jean-Baptiste Raymond de Lacrosse, acting Captain-General	
8 May 1803 to 6 February 1810	Jean Augustin Ernouf, Captain-General	
British Suzerainty
6 February 1810 to 7 December 1814	British occupation	
6 February 1810 to 26 June 1813	Sir Alexander Cochrane, Governor	
26 June 1813 to December 1814	John Skinner, Governor	
French Suzerainty
7 December 1814 to 12 December 1814
12 December 1814 to 10 August 1815	Charles Durand, comte de Linois, Governor	
British Suzerainty
10 August 1815 to 25 July 1816	British occupation	
10 August 1815 to 24 April 1816	Sir James Leith, Governor	
24 April 1816 to 25 July 1816

== Restoration, Second Republic, Second Empire ==
Term	Incumbent	Notes
French Suzerainty
1816 to 1823	Antoine Philippe de Lardenoy, Governor	
1823 to 1826	Louis Léon Jacob, Governor	
31 May 1826 to 1830	Jean Julien Angot des Rotours, Governor	
31 January 1830 to 8 July 1831	Louis François Vatable, Governor	
1831 to 20 June 1837	René Arnous des Saulsays, Governor	
1837 to 1841	Jean-Guillaume Jubelin, Governor	
1841 to 7 June 1845	Augustin Gourbeyre, Governor	
24 August 1845 to 5 June 1848	Jean-François Layrle, Governor	
5 June 1848 to 1848	Alexandre Gatine, acting Governor	
1848 to 1849	Jean Jacques Louis Fabvre. acting Governor	
1849 to 1849	Jean Jacques Louis Fabvre	
9 September 1849 to 1851	Jacques Amédée Philippe Fiéron	
1851 to 1851	Chaumont, acting Governor	
15 September 1851 to 1853	Tranquille Aubry-Bailleul, Governor	
30 September 1853 to 1856	Philibert Augustin Bonfils, Governor	
1856 to 1857	Guillet, acting Governor	
March 1857 to April 1859	Philippe Victor Touchard, Governor	
1859 to January 1860	Louis Bontemps, Governor	
January 1860 to 1864	Charles Victor Frébault, Governor	
1864 to 1864	Joseph Desmazes, acting Governor	
1864 to 1870	Louis Hippolyte de Lormel, Governor	

== Third, Fourth, Fifth republics ==
Term	Incumbent	Notes
1870 to 1880	Gabriel Couturier, Governor	
1880 to 1881	Mazé, acting Governor	
1881 to 1886	Léonce Laugier, Governor	
1886 to 1886	Sainte-Luce, acting Governor	
1886 to 1891	Antoine Frédéric Henry Le Boucher, Governor	
1891 to 1894	Louis Hippolyte Marie Nouet, Governor	
1894 to 1895	Noël Pardon, Governor	
1895 to 1901	Delphino Moracchini, Governor	
1901 to 1903	Martial Merlin, Governor	
1903 to 1905	Paul Marie Armand de La Loyère, Governor	
1905 to 1907	Léon Jules Pol Boulloche, Governor	
1907 to 1909	Victor Marie Louis Ballot, Governor	
1909 to 1910	Henri Cor, Governor	
1911 to 1913	Jean Jules Émile Peuvergne, Governor	
1913 to 1917	Émile Merwart, Governor	
1917 to 1920	Maurice Gourbeil, Governor	
1920 to 1924	Pierre Louis Alfred Duprat, Governor	
1924 to 1924	Jocelyn Robert, Governor	
1924 to 1926	Maurice Beurnier, Governor	
1926 to 1929	Louis Gerbinis, Governor	
1929 to 1931	Théophile Antoine Pascal Tellier, Governor	
1931 to 1934	Alphonse Choteau, Governor	
1934 to 1936	Louis Bouge, Governor	
1936 to 1938	Félix Éboué, Governor	
29 November 1938 to 21 February 1940	François Pierre-Alype, Governor	
30 April 1940 to 15 July 1943	Constant Sorin, Governor	
1944 to 1946	Maurice Pierre Eugène Bertaut, Governor	
19 March 1946	French overseas département	
30 April 1946 to 12 October 1947	Ernest de Nattes, Governor	
26 December 1947 to 24 November 1950	Gilbert Eugène Félicien Marie Philipson, Prefect	
16 January 1951 to 18 May 1954	Gaston Villéger, Prefect	
18 May 1954 to 18 December 1955	Jacques Ravail, Prefect	
22 December 1955 to 22 May 1956	Guy Malines, acting Prefect	
22 May 1956 to 6 March 1958	Guy Malines, Prefect	
6 March 1958 to 1 October 1960	Jean-Pierre Abeille, Prefect	
1 October 1960 to 1 August 1965	Albert Bonhomme, Prefect	
1 August 1965 to 12 July 1967	Pierre Bolotte, Prefect	
16 August 1967 to 16 December 1969	Jean Deleplanque, Prefect	
16 December 1969 to 1 July 1973	Pierre Mathieu Brunon, Prefect	
12 July 1973 to 15 November 1975	Jacques Le Cornec, Prefect	
15 November 1975 to 15 October 1978	Jean-Claude Aurousseau, Prefect	
15 October 1978 to 28 February 1982	Guy Maillard, Prefect	
28 February 1982 to 10 May 1982	Robert Miguet, Prefect	
10 May 1982 to 13 February 1984	Robert Miguet, Commissioner of the Republic	
February 1984 to April 1986	Maurice Saborin, Commissioner of the Republic	
9 April 1986 to 4 November 1987	Yves Bonnet, Commissioner of the Republic	
4 November 1987 to 24 February 1988	Bernard Sarazin, Commissioner of the Republic	
24 February 1988 to November 1989	Bernard Sarazin, Prefect	
November 1989 to 18 July 1991	Jean-Paul Proust, Prefect	
31 July 1991 to 6 October 1993	Franck Perriez, Prefect	
6 October 1993 to 21 November 1994	Alain Frouté, Prefect	
21 November 1994 to 16 October 1996	Michel Diefenbacher, Prefect	
12 November 1996 to 16 August 1999	Jean Fedini, Prefect	
16 August 1999 to 6 August 2002	Jean-François Carenco, Prefect	
6 August 2002 to 7 July 2004	Dominique Vian, Prefect	
7 July 2004 to 29 October 2009	Paul Girot de Langlade, Prefect	
29 October 2009 to 24 August 2011	Jean-Luc Michel Fabre, Prefect	
17 July 2011 to 11 September 2011	Philippe Jaumouillé, Acting Prefect	
11 September 2011 to 23 January 2013	Amaury de Saint-Quentin, Prefect	
23 January 2013 to 21 December 2014	Marcelle Pierrot, Prefect	
21 December 2014 to present	Jacques Billant, Prefect	

== Sources ==
- Cahoon, Ben, "Gaudeloupe", Worldstatesmen.org
