= Louis-Florent de Vallière =

Governor of Saint-Domingue (1721–1775)

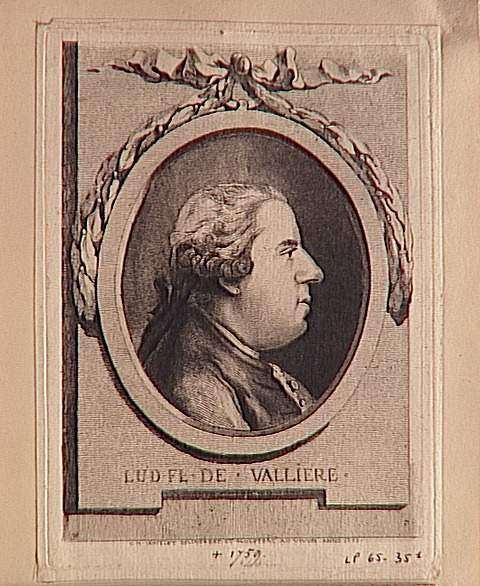
- 1755 portrait

Governor of Saint-Domingue
- In office 30 April 1772 – 15 April 1775
- Preceded by: Pierre Gédéon de Nolivos; De la Ferronays (acting)
- Succeeded by: Jean-François de Reynaud de Villeverd (acting); Victor-Thérèse Charpentier

Personal details
- Born: 19 June 1721 Paris, France
- Died: 10 April 1775 (aged 53) Port-au-Prince, Saint-Domingue

Louis-Florent de Vallière (or Devalière; 19 June 1721 – 10 April 1775) was Governor General of the French colony of Saint-Domingue, now Haiti.

== Origins ==
Louis Florent de Vallière was born on 19 June 1721 in Paris. His parents were Florent-Jean de Vallière (1667–1759) and Marguerite Martin of Quesnoy (died 1763). His older brother was Joseph Florant, Marquis de Vallière (1717–1776). He became Director of Artillery and Engineers in 1747. He became a Lieutenant General of the King's Armies, Governor of the town and castle of Bergues, Lord of Parnes, Commander of the Royal and Military Order of Saint Louis.

== Governor of Saint-Domingue ==
Louis-Florent, chevalier de Vallière, was governor of Saint-Domingue from October 1772 until his death on 10 April 1775. Vallière and the new intendant Jean-François Vincent de Montarcher replaced the outgoing governor Pierre Gédéon de Nolivos and intendant Alexandre-Jaques de Bongars. Nolivos had left on 10 February 1770, and was replaced as interim governor by De la Ferronnays on 15 January 1772.

Soon after taking office, Vallière and Montarcher had to deal with the question of the mulatto Marie-Victoire. The planter Philippe Morisseau, who died in 1770 or 1771, left a will that provided that six of his mulatto slaves were manumitted. His brother and heir claimed that as inheritor only he could grant manumission. The former governor and indendant had ruled in his favor in an ordinance of 15 February 1771. Vallière and Montarcher issued an ordinance that declared Marie-Victoire and her daughter were free by birth. Their basis was that Marie-Victoire's baptismal act gave the status of her mother as "free". The decision was appealed to the Conseil d'État in Paris, which on 22 December 1775 struck down the ordinance of Vallière and Montarcher, saying that masters alone could not give freedom to slaves, which could only be done by the king or the Conseil d'État.

Louis Florent de Vallière transformed the Port-au-Prince market, a 100 by 150 metres (330 by 490 ft) quadrangle, into a public garden. Some time later the garden held the city's first auditorium, "La Comédie". Today the space is occupied by the Marché Vallière, a market.

Louis Florent de Vallière died in Port-au-Prince on 10 April 1775. Reynaud de Villeverd took his place as interim governor from 12 May to 16 August 1775, when he was replaced by Thérèse Charpentier, Count of Ennery.

== Sources ==
- Debien, G. (June 1964), "Soucis d'un officier colonial (Saint-Domingue, 1784-1785)" (PDF), Revue d'histoire de l'Amérique française (in French), 18 (1): 138, doi:10.7202/302345ar
- Ghachem, Malick W. (5 March 2012), The Old Regime and the Haitian Revolution, Cambridge University Press, ISBN 978-0-521-83680-7
- "Il y a un an, le marché Vallière..." (PDF), Bulletin de l'Ispan (in French) (2), ’Institut de Sauvegarde du Patrimoine National, 1 July 2009
- Jan, J.M. (1951), Les congrégations religieuses au cap français Saint-Domingue 1681-1793 (PDF), Port-au-Prince, Haiti: Henri Deschamps
- The Colonial Machine : Back Matter: Biographical Appendix
- Vivant, Martine, "Louis Florent Monsieur le Chevalier de Vallière", Geneanet (in French)
