= Charles de Brunier, Marquis de Larnage =

Governor in the French Caribbean

Governor of Marie-Galante
- In office 23 August 1714 – June 1723
- Monarchs: Louis XIV (until September 1715) and Louis XV
- Preceded by: Bonnaventure-François de Boisfermé
- Succeeded by: Ravary

Governor of Grenada
- In office 1723–1734
- Monarch: Louis XV
- Preceded by: Robert Giraud du Poyet
- Succeeded by: Jean Fournier de Charles de Pradines

Governor of Saint Dominge
- In office 11 November 1737 – November 1746 (his death)
- Monarch: Louis XV
- Preceded by: Étienne Cochard de Chastenoye
- Succeeded by: Étienne Cochard de Chastenoye

Personal details
- Born: 1687 France
- Died: November 1746 (aged 58–59)

Charles de Brunier (1687–November 1746) was the governor of Marie-Galante 1714 to 1723. He then served as governor of French Grenada from 1727 to 1734 and then the governor-general of Haiti from 1737 until his death in 1746. He is mentioned on the West wall of the museum of the permanent museum of colonies and is even described as the “father of the colony”.

He wrote a book with Simon-Pierre Maillart (or Maillard) a few months before his death called “Ordonnance des Administrateurs, concernant les Négres-Epaves. Du 2 Juillet 1745”
