= Invasion of Guadeloupe (1759) =

1759 battle

- Part of the Seven Years' War
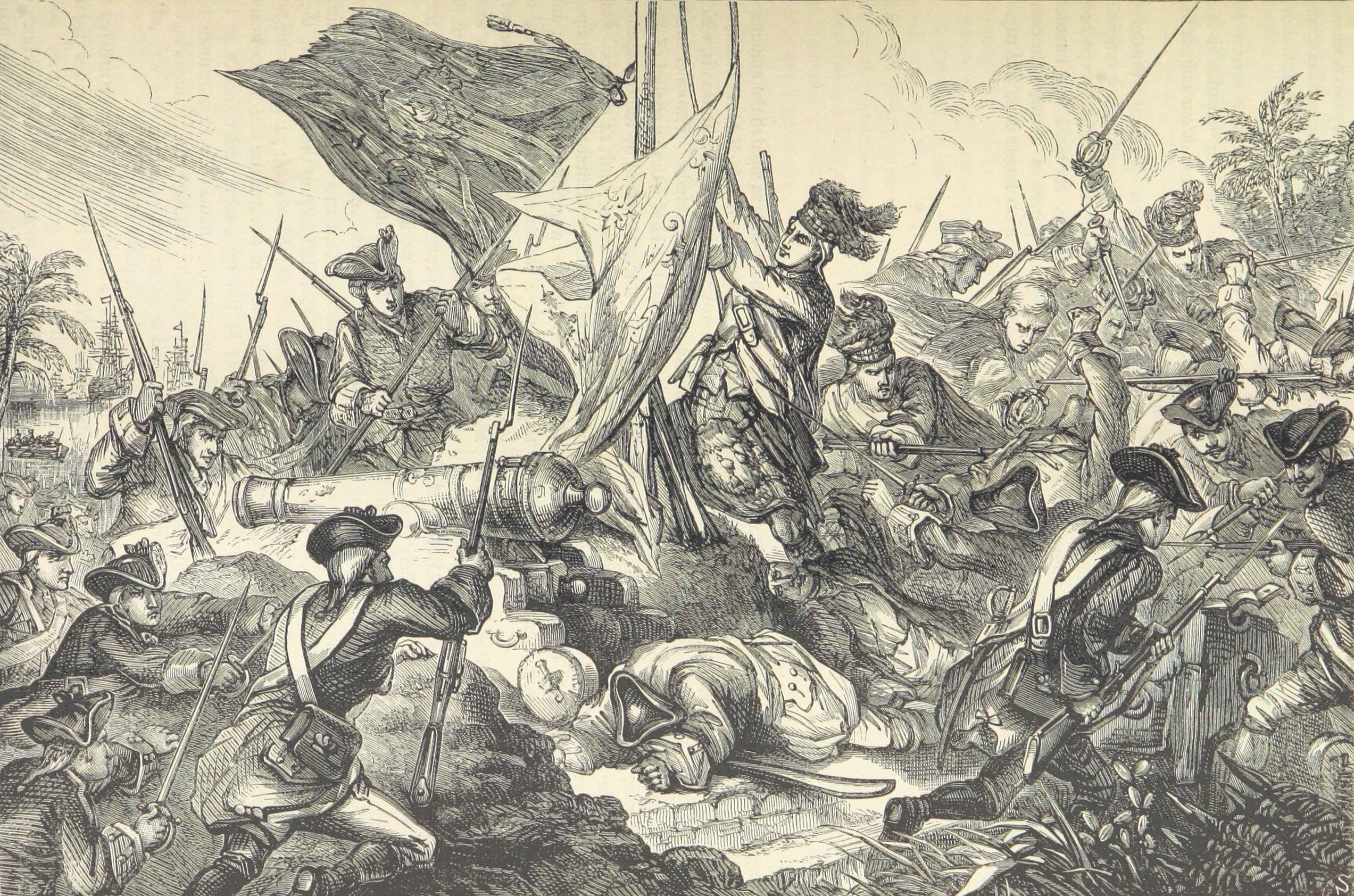
- 1873 illustration of the invasion
Date	22 January – 1 May 1759
Location	Guadeloupe, West Indies
Result	British victory
Territorial changes	Guadeloupe occupied by the British until 1763

Belligerents
Great Britain	France

Commanders and leaders
Peregrine Hopson; John Barrington	Maximin de Bompart

Strength
6,000	Unknown

Casualties and losses
Unknown	Unknown

The invasion of Guadeloupe was a military action from January to May 1759, as part of the Seven Years' War. A large British force had arrived in the West Indies, intending to seize French possessions. After a six-month-long battle to capture Guadeloupe they finally received the formal surrender of the island, just days before a large French relief force arrived under Admiral Maximin de Bompart. Though Guadeloupe was returned to France in 1763, the capture of the island contributed to the Annus Mirabilis of 1759.

== Background ==
To divert French troops from Germany, William Pitt decided the British should attack France wherever they could.

British troops were sent on diversionary attacks on the French coast, at St. Malo and Cherbourg. An expedition to western Africa captured the French slaving station at Senegal. In North America, a force was dispatched to take Louisbourg and Quebec.

In India Robert Clive won the Battle of Plassey.

For 1759, Pitt directed attention to the West Indies, specifically Martinique and Guadeloupe.
Major-General Peregrine Hopson, who had been Governor at Nova Scotia before the outbreak of war, was appointed to the chief command, and Colonel John Barrington, a junior officer, was selected to be his second.

On 12 November 1758, the transports, escorted by 8 ships of the line under Commodore Hughes, got under way and sailed with a fair wind to the west.

On 3 January 1759, the British expedition reached Barbados where Commodore John Moore was waiting with two more ships of the line to join it and to take command of the fleet. The total expeditionary force numbered some 6,800 men.

=== Attempt against Martinique ===
The primary target of the attack was Martinique. Hopson landed his troops near Fort Royal and fought a battle against the French, leaving 100 British dead or wounded. The terrain ahead was judged so difficult, that it was decided to re-embark the troops immediately. A second landing was considered at Saint-Pierre but the defenses were so formidable that Hopson decided to abandon the attack on Martinique and proceed to Guadeloupe.

== Attack against Guadeloupe ==
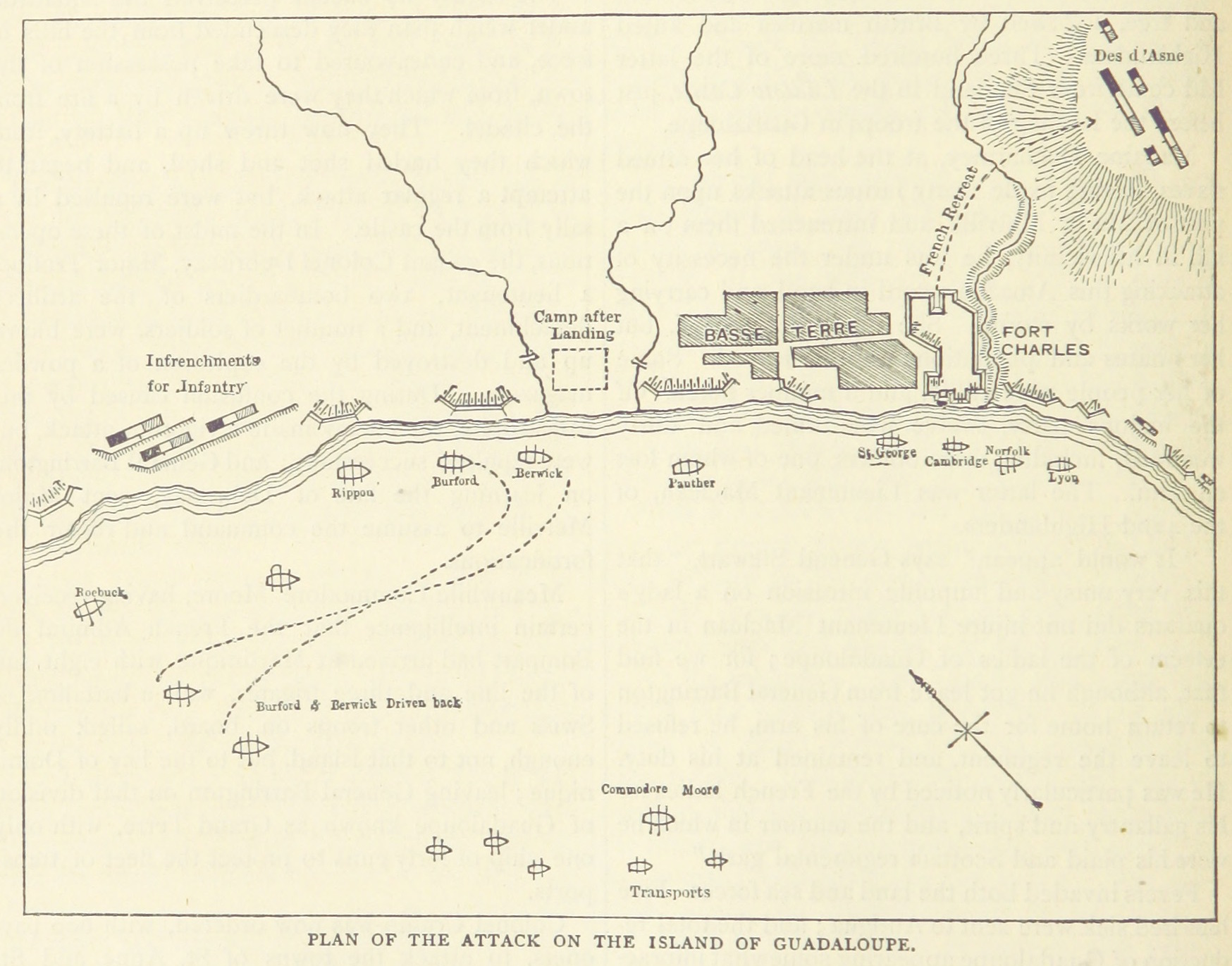
A map of the initial invasion

The fleet sailed to Basse-Terre and on 22 January 1759 opened fire on the town, reducing it to a heap of blackened ruins. At dawn on 24 January, the British troops were landed, and moved inwards for some 5 km, until they met a strong French position in a rugged, mountainous terrain.

By that time the men on the sick list numbered 1,500, or fully a quarter of the force. Hopson's health was failing rapidly too and he remained inactive. Even the representations of Barrington could not stimulate him to further action. On 27 February, Hopson died, leaving the command to devolve to Barrington. The British expeditionary force was by now on the brink of destruction. More than 600 invalids had been sent to Antigua, and another 1,600 men were on the sick list. The remainder were succumbing so fast that sufficient men could hardly be found to do the daily duty.

Meanwhile, John Moore, being independent of Hopson in respect of naval operations, had sent ships round to Fort Louis. They speedily battered the fort into surrender and installed a garrison of 300 Highlanders and Marines on 14 February 1759. Barrington transferred most of the soldiers from Fort Royal, Martinique, to Fort Louis on the Grande-Terre side of Guadeloupe. In March he used this as a base from which naval transport carried separate forces under Brigadiers Byam Crump and John Clavering to attack French positions around the island. The attacks were highly effective, and the French capitulated on 2 May 1759. The French governor Nadau du Treil signed the capitulation.

== Aftermath ==
Although the island had been captured, the diseases rife on the island proved fatal to many British troops. By the close of the seven months that remained of the year 1759 nearly 800 officers and men of the garrison had found their graves in Guadeloupe. The island was returned to French control after the Treaty of Paris, in return for France ceding its colonies in Canada.

== Bibliography ==
- Anderson, Fred. Crucible of War: Faber and Faber, 2000
- McLynn, Frank. 1759: The Year Britain Became Master of the World. Pimlico, 2005

=== Sources ===
- British expedition against Martinique and Guadeloupe
- Olive Tree Genealogy
- An Historical Sketch of the 64th Regiment by Major HG Purdon

This article was originally based on material from , which is licensed under the GFDL.
