= Lebas =

Lebas is a French surname. Notable people with the surname include:

- Alain Lebas (born 1953), French sprint canoeist
- Jean-Baptiste Lebas (1898–1944), French politician
- Louis-Hippolyte Lebas (1782–1867), French architect

== See also ==
- Le Bas (surname)
