= Damian Le Bas (writer) =

British writer and journalist

Damian Le Bas FRSL
- Born: 11 May 1985 (age 41)
- Education: St John's College, Oxford
- Relatives: Damian Le Bas; Delaine Le Bas (parents)
- Writing career
- Language: English; Angloromani
- Notable work: The Stopping Places: A Journey Through Gypsy Britain

Damian James Le Bas (born 11 May 1985) is a British writer and journalist from West Sussex in England best known for his book The Stopping Places: A Journey Through Gypsy Britain.

== Life ==
Le Bas is the son of the artists Damian Le Bas and Delaine Le Bas. He grew up in Worthing, attending Christ's Hospital school and then reading Theology at St John's College, Oxford. His work as a journalist has included editorship of Travellers Times.

In 2018 he presented the BBC documentary A Very British History: Romany Gypsies.

In 2019, he was part of a panel discussion on the theme of Identity at the Alpine Fellowship.

In 2022, he was awarded an Honorary Masters of Education by the University of Chichester.

Le Bas was elected a Fellow of the Royal Society of Literature (FRSL) in 2025.

== Bibliography ==
In 2018, Le Bas published The Stopping Places: A Journey Through Gypsy Britain, a mixture of memoir, travel writing and an exploration of Romani history in Britain. In June 2018, the book was featured on BBC Radio 4 as book of the week.

Before its publication, The Stopping Places won a 2016 Jerwood Award supporting authors writing their first major commissioned non-fiction work.
