= Henri Édouard de Copley =

Governor of Guadeloupe (interim)
- In office 24 June 1764 – 20 March 1765
- Monarch: Louis XV
- Preceded by: François-Charles de Bourlamaque
- Succeeded by: Pierre Gédéon de Nolivos

Baron Henri Édouard de Copley was interim Governor of Guadeloupe from 1764 to 1765.

== Early career ==
Copley joined the army as an ensign on 22 August 1731, became a lieutenant in 1732 and a captain in 1733. He was made a captain of the grenadiers on 10 August 1751, and a battalion commander on 2 February 1753. He was promoted to lieutenant-colonel on 16 December 1744 and colonel on 1 February 1749. He was promoted to brigadier of infantry on 20 February 1761. He held the Grand Cross of Notre-Dame-du-Mont-Carmel et de Saint-Lazare.

== Guadeloupe (1763–1765) ==
In 1763 Baron Copley was sent to Guadeloupe as second in command. Henri Édouard, baron de Copley succeeded François-Charles de Bourlamaque as interim Governor of Guadeloupe on 24 June 1764. Bourlamaque had died in Guadeloupe on the night of 23–24 June 1764. Copley was not familiar with colonial administration and relied on the experience of the intendant Louis de Thomassin de Peynier (1705–1794). When Peynier was called to Martinique the subdelegate-general, Laval, took over the functions of intendant of Guadeloupe.

One of the issues Copley had to deal with was contraband, but a more serious problem was settling problems that followed from the peace treaty. The French of Grenada, now an English colony, felt they were being mistreated by the governor and had complained to Bourlamaque. Copley knew that Bourlamaque had returned money owing to the English in Martinique and Guadeloupe, and was indignant about the difficulties being experienced by the French on Grenada. He sent Gabriel Rousseau de Villejouin to talk to Governor George Scott of Grenada, but with little effect since there was no force to back him up.

Pierre Gédéon de Nolivos was appointed Governor on 20 March 1765. Copley was replaced by the Comte de Nolivos on 14 June 1765.

== Later career ==
Copley was made a Knight of the Order of Saint Louis. His daughter married James Conway, a brigadier-general in the French army of Irish origins. On 16 April 1767 Copley was made a maréchal de camp.

== Sources ==
- Annuaire de la Guadeloupe et dépendances pour l'année 1903, Basse-Terre: Imprimerie de gouvernement
- Cahoon, Ben, "Guadeloupe", worldstatesmen.org
- "Copley, Henry Edouard de (cité en 1731-1767; Baron)", Archives nationales d'outre-mer (in French)
- Dessalles, Adrien (1848), Histoire politique et commerciale des Antilles ... traitant des evenements survenus aux Antilles, depuis la paix d'Aix-la-Chapelle, jusqu'a la mort de Louis XV; des essais de colonisation faits durant cette periode, et des proces intentes aux jesuites, a la suite du commerce entrepris a la Martinque par le pere Lavallette: 5, Paris: France
- Foster, J. (1886), The royal lineage of our noble and gentle families, Рипол Классик, ISBN 978-5-87180-617-3
- Roque, Louis de La; Barthélemy, Edouard de (1865), Catalogue de la noblesse des colonies et des familles anoblies ou titrées sous l'Empire, la Restauration et le Gouvernement de juillet, E. Dentu
- Stacey, C.P. (1974). "Bourlamaque, François-Charles de". In Halpenny, Francess G. (ed.). Dictionary of Canadian Biography. Vol. III (1741–1770) (online ed.). University of Toronto Press.
