= Pierre Gédéon de Nolivos =

French soldier and a rich slave plantations owner

Governor of Guadeloupe
- In office 20 March 1765 – 29 November 1768
- Monarch: Louis XV
- Preceded by: Édouard de Copley (interim)
- Succeeded by: Maures de Malartic

Governor of Saint-Domingue
- In office 10 February 1769 – 15 January 1772
- Preceded by: Louis-Armand-Constantin de Rohan
- Succeeded by: De la Ferronays (intérim); Louis-Florent de Vallière

Personal details
- Born: 25 November 1715 Léogâne, Saint-Domingue
- Died: 6 December 1794 (aged 79) Pau, Pyrénées-Atlantiques

Pierre Gédéon, Comte de Nolivos (born 25 November 1715) was a French soldier and a rich slave plantations owner. He served as Governor of Guadeloupe from 1765 to 1768, then as Governor of Saint-Domingue from 1769 to 1772.

== Early years ==
Pierre Gédéon René de Nolivos was born on 25 November 1715 in Léogâne in the French colony of Saint-Domingue (now Haiti). He was baptized on 17 September 1716 in Léogâne. His father, also called Pierre Gédéon, was born in Sauveterre-de-Béarn, son of a judge in the Parliament of Navarre, and took part in a number of privateering expeditions before being sent to Saint-Domingue in 1707. His mother was Renée Giet (1683–1756). His father arrived in Saint Domingue in 1707 as captain of a free company. He was appointed major at Petit-Goâve on 4 December 1717, and knight of the Order of Saint Louis on 23 December 1721. He died in Léogane on 14 August 1732.

Nolivos joined the navy as an ensign and was promoted to lieutenant and then ship's captain (capitaine de vaisseaux). In 1745 Pierre Gédéon de Nolivos was an officer in the squadron of the Marquis de Caylus, Governor general of the Windward Islands, who judged him "full of zeal, fire and ambition". He was appointed brigadier, then aide général des logis or assistant to the chief of staff of the Army of Bas-Rhin in 1761.

== Governor of Guadeloupe ==
Islands in the Caribbean

In 1764 Nolivos was appointed Governor of Gaudeloupe, where he served from March 1765 to December 1768. One of his projects was to establish a free port. In April 1765 he entrusted two merchants of Basse-Terre with a reconnaissance mission in the northern islands. The concept was to establish an entrepot where goods could be stored for export against payment of a tax of 1% to 3%. The goods would be syrup and tafia (a type of rum) which were in demand in America but not in Europe. The entrepôt could also be used as an outlet for surplus products from France such as wine, liqueur, oil and soap. The result would be to reduce contraband and keep English trade away from the French colonies. The project was abandoned in November 1765 in Saint Martin, but resumed two years later in Saint Lucia and Saint Domingue.

== Governor of Saint Domingue ==
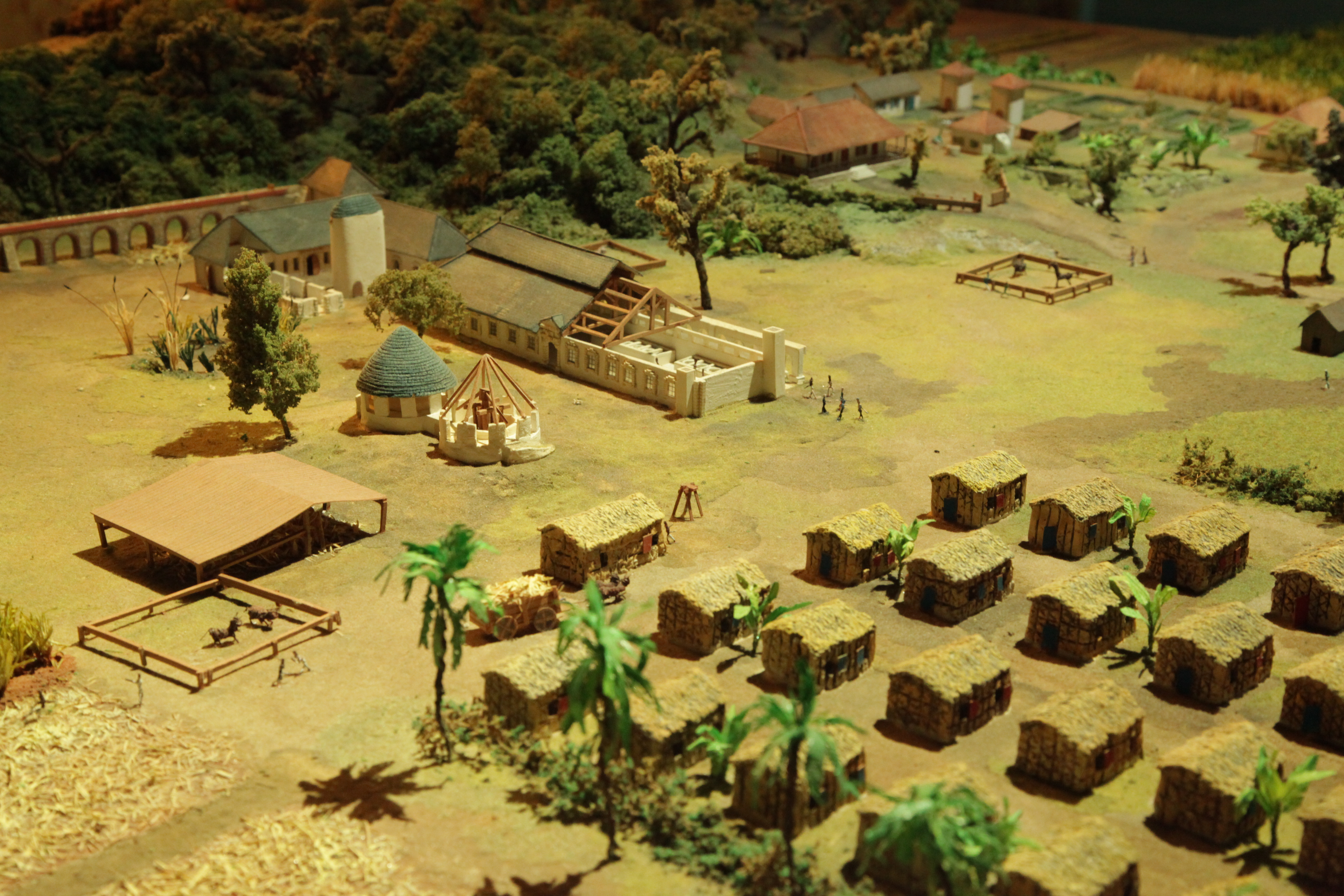
Model of the Nolivos sugar plantation in Saint-Domingue

After leaving Gaudeloupe, Nolivos was governor of Saint Domingue from September 1769 to January 1772. Nolivos had great wealth, and owned various coffee and sugar plantations in Saint-Domingue, as well as a townhouse on the rue de la Grange Batelière, Paris. In 1771 in Port-au-Prince he married Suzanne Marcombe, widow of Ambroise Roux, of a family originally from Angers. His wife was born in 1714. The marriage contract was signed on 6 March 1771. Nolivos' property listed in the contract included large sums of money, 46 domestic slaves, 26 horses, furniture and silverware. His wife also bought money, a coffee plantation, 40 negro slaves and other property. Before the wedding on 19 March 1771 the men were entertained in the governor's palace, and the women in the intendance. The guests of both sexes joined in the church at one o'clock.

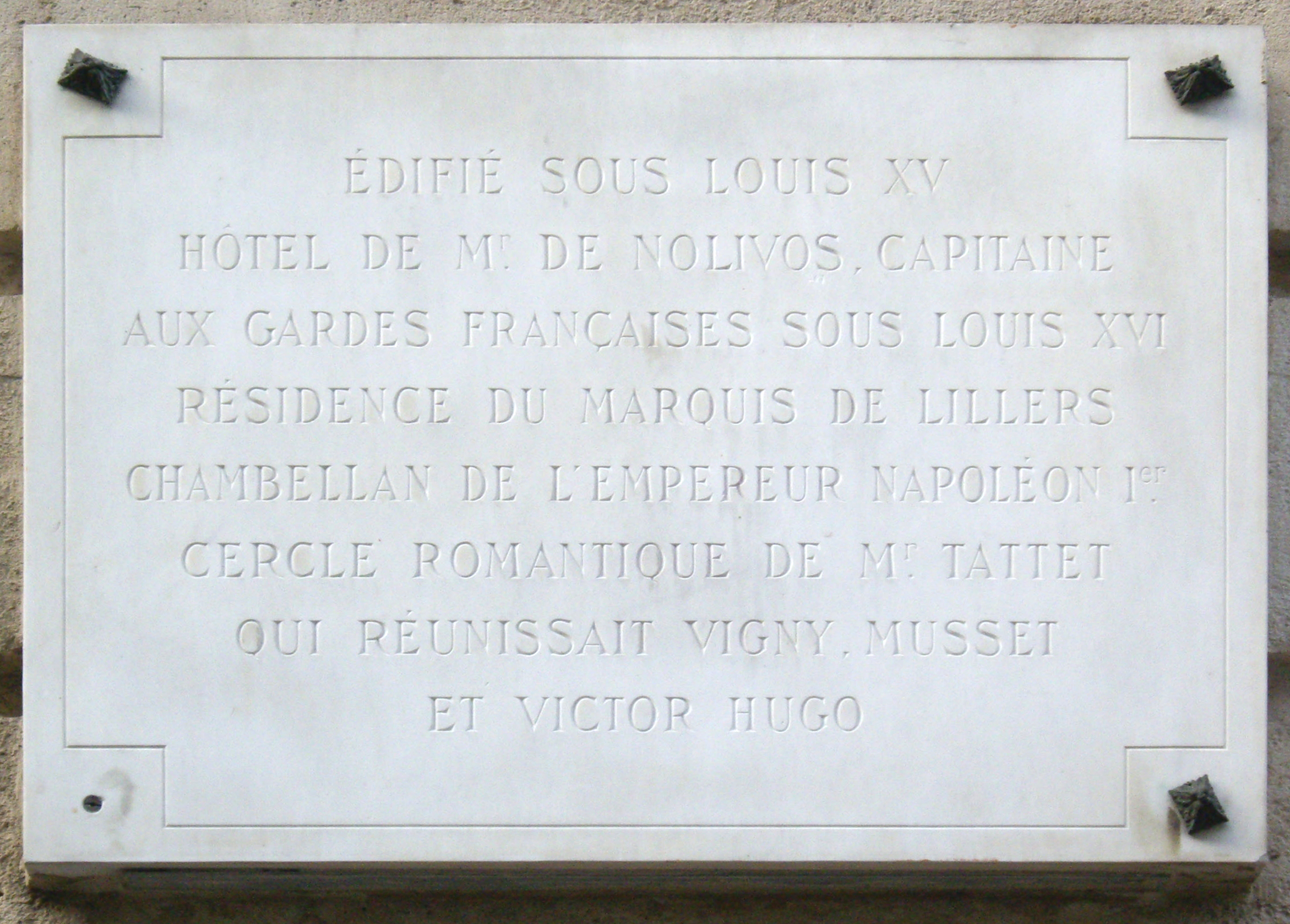
Plaque on rue Grange Batelière house

== Last years ==
Nolivos was recalled by the king on 14 September 1771. He and his wife left Saint-Domingue at the end of that year on the ship Thomas, and disembarked in Nantes in April 1772. Three of the servants who accompanied them were slaves, Jean Simon, cook, Jean Louis, valet and Charlotte, mulatto. A legal document of 28 May 1773 shows that Nolivos and his wife were living in Paris on the rue Grange Batelière.

The Count of Nolivos received a pension of 6,000 livres in 1775. He retired to his family lands in Béarn after the death of his wife on 21 August 1782 in Paris. During the French Revolution, on 7 November 1793 Nolivos, aged 79 and widowed without children, was placed on the list of suspects as an aristocrat, as was his nephew the Marquis de Nolivos, aged 41 and married with four children. He was released on 24 October 1794. The date of his death is unknown.

== Sources ==
- Bailey, Gauvin Alexander (6 June 2018), Architecture and Urbanism in the French Atlantic Empire: State, Church, and Society, 1604-1830, MQUP, ISBN 978-0-7735-5376-7
- Force, Pierre (15 December 2016), Wealth and Disaster: Atlantic Migrations from a Pyrenean Town in the Eighteenth and Nineteenth Centuries, JHU Press, ISBN 978-1-4214-2128-5
- Guibert, Jean-Sébastien (September–December 2010), "De Saint-Martin à Pointe-à-Pitre : le développement portuaire de la Guadeloupe à travers l'administration du gouverneur Pierre Gédéon de Nolivos (1765-1768)" (PDF), Bulletin de la Société d'Histoire de la Guadeloupe (in French) (157): 3, doi:10.7202/1036830ar
- La Blant, Robert (1831), "Un officier Bearnais a Saint-Domingue", Revue historique et archéologique du Béarn et du pays basque, G. Lescher-Moutoué.
- Pierfit, "Pierre Gédéon René de NOLIVOS", Geneanet (in French)
- Rossignol, Bernadette; Rossignol, Philippe, "Le comte de NOLIVOS et la gestion de ses habitations de Saint-Domingue" (PDF), Généalogie et Histoire de la Caraïbe (in French)
