= Abraham Duquesne-Guitton =

French naval commander (1648–1724)

Governor general of the French Antilles
- In office 1714–1717
- Preceded by: Robert Cloche de La Malmaison
- Succeeded by: Antoine d'Arcy de la Varenne (interim); François de Pas de Mazencourt

Personal details
- Born: 1648
- Died: 1724 (aged 75–76) Rochefort, France

Military service
- Allegiance: France

Captain, later Admiral, Abraham de Bellebat (Belébat?) de Duquesne-Guitton, also spelled Duquesne-Guiton, (French pronunciation: [dykɛn ɡitɔ̃]; 1648–1724) was a French naval commander.

In 1687, he sailed from the Cape of Good Hope in L'Oiseau, with a French Ambassador, Claude Céberet du Boullay, on board, to establish a French embassy in Ayutthaya.

He sighted Eendrachtsland on the Western Australian coast and sailed in close to shore near the Swan River on 4 August; this was France's first recorded contact with Australia. He wrote that it looked very attractive, and fully covered with green despite "the fact that we were in the middle of winter in this country".

His nephew Nicolas Gedeon de Voutron also sighted the western coast of Australia that year on another ship at the same latitude.

He was appointed Governor General of the Windward Islands in the West Indies ("Gouverneur général des Isles du Vent") in reward for renouncing Protestantism and becoming a Catholic, and held that office from 1714 to 1717.
