= John Clavering (British Army officer) =

Lieutenant-General Sir John Clavering KB
- Born: bapt. 1722
- Died: 30 August 1777 (aged 55)
- Military career
- Allegiance: Kingdom of Great Britain
- Branch: British Army
- Rank: Lieutenant-General
- Commands: Indian Army
- Conflicts: Seven Years' War
- Awards: Knight Companion of the Order of the Bath

Lieutenant-General Sir John Clavering KB (bapt. 1722 – 30 August 1777) was an army officer and diplomat.

== Military career ==
Baptised in Lanchester, County Durham, England in 1722, Clavering was the younger son of Sir James Clavering Bt and Catherine Yorke, and younger brother of Sir Thomas Clavering, 7th Baronet. He was commissioned as ensign in the army in 1736, and was a captain of the Coldstream Guards by 1753.

During the Seven Years' War, Clavering served in the West Indies. During the Invasion of Guadeloupe Major-General John Barrington transferred most of the soldiers from Fort Royal, Martinique, to Fort Louis on the Grande-Terre side of Guadeloupe. In March he used this as a base from which naval transport carried separate forces under Brigadiers Byam Crump and John Clavering to attack French positions around the island. The attacks were highly effective, and the French capitulated on 2 May 1759.

In 1762, Clavering obtained a colonelcy on the 52nd (Oxfordshire) Regiment of Foot. Promoted to Lieutenant General, in 1770, Clavering was appointed as governor of Landguard Fort. In 1773, Clavering travelled to India as a member of the Supreme Council of Bengal. In 1774, shortly after Warren Hastings was appointed Governor General, Clavering was appointed as Commander in Chief in India.

He was created a Knight of the Bath in 1775. He died at Calcutta, India, and is buried there in South Park Street Cemetery.

== Family ==
Clavering was married twice; firstly (in 1756) he married Lady Diana West, daughter of John West, 1st Earl De La Warr. Lady Diana died in 1766. In 1772, Clavering married his cousin, Catherine Yorke.

Military offices
| Preceded by Sir John Sebright | Colonel of the 52nd Regiment of Foot; 1762–1777 | Succeeded by Cyrus Trapaud |
| Preceded by Robert Armiger | Governor of Landguard Fort; 1770–1776 | Succeeded by Hon. Alexander Mackay |
| Preceded by Alexander Champion | Commander-in-Chief, India; 1774–1777 | Succeeded by Giles Stibbert |
| Preceded by Robert Monckton | Governor of Berwick-upon-Tweed; 1776–1777 | Succeeded by Sir John Mordaunt |
