= Byam Crump =

Governor of Guadeloupe
- In office May 1759 – 11 March 1760
- Preceded by: John Barrington
- Succeeded by: Campbell Dalrymple

Personal details
- Died: 11 March 1760 Guadeloupe
- Occupation: Soldier

Byam Crump (died 11 March 1760) was a British soldier who was briefly Governor of Guadeloupe. He took part in the invasion of that island during the Seven Years' War, and became governor and commander of the occupying forces in May 1759. The British soldiers suffered greatly from disease, and Crump himself succumbed in March 1760.

== Background ==
A Biam Crump graduated from Leiden University on 5 November 1736. On 7 March 1742 Byam Crump joined the troop [of Antigua]. In December 1753 Byam Crump, Esquire, was appointed major to Colonel Alexander Duroure's 38th Regiment of Foot in Antigua.

During the Seven Years' War (1756–1763), on 27 February 1759 Major-General John Barrington succeeded to the command of the British forces during the invasion of Guadeloupe. He transferred most of the soldiers from Fort Royal, Martinique, to Fort Louis on the Grande-Terre side of Guadeloupe. In March he used this as a base from which naval transport carried separate forces under Brigadiers Byam Crump and John Clavering to attack French positions around the island. The attacks were highly effective, and the French started surrender negotiations on 21 April 1759. They formally capitulated on 2 May 1759.

== Governor of Guadeloupe ==
Barrington left Guadeloupe on 25 June 1759 and Crump took over as governor. In the fall of that year Crump recorded that eight officers and 577 men had died since June. The high number of deaths was in part due to what Crump called "very sultry weather", and also to lack of housing where the sick could be treated properly. Crump did what he could to reduce mortality, but the troops continued to fall ill and die. Crump found that his surgeons did not have experience with the Guadeloupe climate. He immediately hired a local French doctor to supervise his military surgeons. Crump wrote in a letter to Barrington that a "good clergyman" would be of "great comfort" to the ailing soldiers, but he would rather than have none than have the type of cleric that was usually sent.

The French were technically blockaded during the war, but in practice found ways to sell their sugar to the North American colonies in exchange for supplies. The sugar was re-branded as British sugar and shipped to London. Around the end of 1759 General Crump wrote a letter to William Pitt in which he said the French islands were completely dependent on this illegal trade and on the prizes they seized. They had not received any provisions from Europe for eight months. He said that it would help any military plans against the French if these practices were stopped. Traders in Guadeloupe during the English occupation continued to make fraudulent shipments to the Dutch colony of Sint Eustatius, which Crump called "that nest of thieves".

Drafts of soldiers from other regiments often included incapable or bad characters the donor regiment did not want. On 24 October 1759 Crump, who badly needed replacements for the men who had died, wrote to Barrington asking him to personally prevent "frauds" who would destroy the Guadeloupe regiments. He asked that Barrington would protect "particularly the King's Own Regiment and not suffer that Corps, which at Culloden saved the Kingdom and upon all occasions has behaved with distinction, to be filled with the refuse of other regiments."

On 11 March 1760 Colonel Byam Crump, Governor of Guadeloupe and Lieutenant-colonel of the 4th Regiment of Foot was seized with an ague [fever] fit about 4 and died about 5, in strong convulsions. Crump was replaced by Campbell Dalrymple. According to a letter of 1760 from Pitt to General Robert Melville, Crump was buried in the fort. When the French reoccupied Guadeloupe, on 6 July 1763 Crump was dug up and delivered to the dogs and the sea.

== Sources ==
- Beer, George Louis (25 November 2010), British Colonial Policy, 1754-1765, Cambridge University Press, ISBN 978-1-108-02296-5
- Brumwell, Stephen (9 January 2006), Redcoats: The British Soldier and War in the Americas, 1755-1763, Cambridge University Press, ISBN 978-0-521-67538-3
- Bruyn, Frans de; Regan, Shaun (30 April 2014), The Culture of the Seven Years' War: Empire, Identity, and the Arts in the Eighteenth-Century Atlantic World, University of Toronto Press, ISBN 978-1-4426-9635-8
- Lara, Oruno D. (8 June 2018), "Guadeloupe. Une tombe insolite", Caribcreolenews (in French)
- Oliver, Vere Langford (1894), The history of the island of Antigua, one of the Leeward Caribbees in the West Indies, from the first settlement in 1635 to the present time, London: Mitchell and Hughes
- Schnakenbourg, Éric (2013), "VI. Des « Isles » de paix au milieu de la guerre : la neutralité dans les mondes ultra-marins", Entre la guerre et la paix (in French), Presses universitaires de Rennes
