= Louis-Gaston de Cacqueray =

French naval officer (1672–1724)

Louis Gaston de Cacqueray

Governor of Saint-Martin
- In office 1701–1702

Personal details
- Born: 11 November 1672 Fort Royal, Martinique, French West Indies
- Died: 18 August 1724 (aged 51)
- Occupation: Naval officer

Louis-Gaston de Cacqueray, seigneur de Valménier (11 November 1672 – 18 August 1724) was a French naval officer who was active in the French Antilles during the War of the Spanish Succession (1701–1714).

== Life ==
Louis-Gaston de Cacqueray, seigneur de Valménier, was born on 11 November 1672 in Fort Royal, Martinique. He was the son of Louis de Cacqueray, seigneur de Valménier (1632–1682) and Catherine de Saint-Ouen. His father was a naval officer and colonial administrator who was governor of Grenada between 1654 and 1658.

Louis-Gaston de Cacqueray joined the navy in 1687. He was appointed a Garde de la Marine on 25 January 1689. In 1690 he distinguished himself under Anne Hilarion de Tourville in the Battle of Beachy Head fought in the English Channel against the combined fleets of England and Holland. He was wounded in this action. On 1 January 1693 he was appointed Enseigne de Vaisseau. That year he served in the 50-gun Envieux and then on the 64-gun Sérieux. He was Lieutenant du Roi at Saint-Christophe from 1697 to 1700. From 1701 to 1702 he was Lieutenant du Roi at Saint-Martin. From 8 November 1702 until 1793 he was Lieutenant du Roi at Guadeloupe.

During the War of the Spanish Succession (1701–1714), on 6 March 1703 an English fleet of 45 vessels carrying 4,000 soldiers and militia arrived off Guadeloupe, which the governor Charles Auger tried to defend against the superior English forces. Nicolas de Gabaret reached Guadeloupe with reinforcements on 3 April 1703 and took command of the defense. His aides de camp were Bonnaventure-François de Boisfermé, governor of Marie-Galante, and two of the king's lieutenants Louis Gaston de Cacqueray de Valmenier and Jean Clair Dyel Du Parquet. An attempt to hold Fort Francis failed and the French were forced to the east. Gabaret adopted scorched earth tactics in Guadeloupe, destroying resources before falling back from the invaders into the interior, then harassing them while disease, drink and lack of food reduced their strength. The English withdrew their troops on 15 May 1703 and sailed away three days later.

On 15 February 1705 Louis-Gaston de Cacqueray was sailing on La Thetis as a passenger when the ship was captured and he was sent to Plymouth as a prisoner. On 10 February 1709 he was again appointed Lieutenant du Roi at Guadeloupe, holding this position until 1713. He was made a knight of the Order of Saint Louis on 25 March 1713. From 7 August 1715 to 16 August 1721 he was Lieutenant du Roi at Martinique. In 1717 he was in Paris when he received the news of the insurrection in Martinique against the Governor General. The court ordered him to leave immediately with M. de la Garrigue, major of Martinique, to suppress this disorder.

Louis-Gaston de Cacqueray died on 18 August 1724 at the age of 51.

== Family ==
Louis-Gaston de Cacqueray was married on 2 January 1799 in Fort-Royal to Françoise-Rose le Vassor de la Touche, daughter of Samuel-François le Vassor de la Touche, captain of the militia, and of Marie-Madeleine d'Orange. Their son, Louis-François de Cacqueray de Valmenier, knight, lord of Sauzaye and other places, served in the first company of musketeers and was married at the castle of Sauzaye on 15 November 1723 to Renée de Saint-Leger, daughter of Jean-Guillaume de Saint-Leger, knight, lord of Sauzaye, Bugaudières, Margaux, etc., ship's captain and knight of the order of Saint-Louis.

From this marriage came, among other children, Madame de Cherisey, wife of the rear admiral Charles Paul Émile de Chérisey (1725–1799), and Jean-Baptiste-Louis-Philippe, count of Cacqueray de Valmenier, rear admiral, grand cross of the order of Saint-Louis. On 14 September 1767 Jean-Baptiste-Louis-Philippe married Marie-Louise de Pradel, daughter of Messire Jean-Baptiste de Pradel, knight, captain of infantry, and Alexandrine de la Chaise. They had, among other children, Henri-François-Louis, count of Cacqueray de Valmenier, born in Rochefort on July August 1769, rear admiral.

== Sources ==
- Dessalles, Adrien (1847b), Histoire politique et commerciale des Antilles ... traitant des evenements survenus aux Antilles, sous le regne de Louis XV. Extraits de ses lettres aux gouverneurs-generaux des iles et aux intendants (in French), vol. 2, France
- Frebault, Henri, "Louis Gaston de Cacqueray-Valmenier", Geneanet
- Harrison, Cy, "Chevalier Louis Gaston de Cacqueray (Seigneur de Valménier)", Threedecks.org
- Lainé, P Louis (1834), Archives généalogiques et historiques de la noblesse de France, ou, Recueil de preuves, mémoires et notices généralogiques, servant à constater l'origine, la filiation, les alliances et lés illustrations religieuses, civiles et militaires de diverses maisons et familles nobles du royaume (in French), vol. 4
- Marley, David (1998), Wars of the Americas: A Chronology of Armed Conflict in the New World, 1492 to the Present, ABC-CLIO, ISBN 978-0-87436-837-6
- Pritchard, James S. (22 January 2004), In Search of Empire: The French in the Americas, 1670–1730, Cambridge University Press, ISBN 978-0-521-82742-3
