= Charles François d'Angennes, Marquis de Maintenon =

French nobleman and buccaneer (1648–1691)

Charles François d’Angennes, Marquis de Maintenon

Governor of Marie-Galante
- In office 1679–1686
- Preceded by: Jacques de Boisseret de Thémericourt
- Succeeded by: Charles Auger

Personal details
- Born: 5 December 1648
- Died: before 2 April 1691
- Occupation: Buccaneer, colonial administrator

Charles François d’Angennes, Marquis de Maintenon (5 December 1648 – before 2 April 1691) was a French nobleman who became a buccaneer in the Caribbean. He sold the Château de Maintenon, his ancestral estate, to Madame de Maintenon, the second wife of King Louis XIV.

He was the oldest son of Louis d’Angennes de Rochefort de Salvert, Marquis de Maintenon et de Meslay, and Marie Le Clerc du Tremblay. Upon his father's death, he inherited the title of Marquis de Maintenon.

He chose not to follow in the footsteps of his ancestors and joined the Navy in 1669 and arrived in the Caribbean on La Sybille. He took command of the ship after the death of her captain in 1672. He joined the expedition against Curaçao and attacked British ships near Saint-Domingue.

He returned to France in 1673, and in 1674, he sold the Maintenon estate to Françoise d'Aubigné, who was granted the title of Marquise de Maintenon by King Louis in 1675. After the sale, d'Angennes returned to the West Indies.

In October 1675, d'Angennes left Nantes as commander of the 24 gun ship Fontaine d'Or. He gathered a fleet of ten ships crewed by 800 buccaneers and in 1676 attacked Isla Margarita, Trinidad and Cumaná.

He became a sugar planter and was appointed governor of the island of Marie-Galante (1679–1686). During this period, he hunted down his former buccaneer allies on the French naval ship La Sorcière. In 1682, Louis XIV granted him a monopoly on trade between Venezuela and the French colonies in the Caribbean.

He married Catherine Girauld de Poincy, daughter of a St Kitts militia captain, and had four children. After 1686, he settled in Martinique with his family where he died in 1691.

== Sources ==
- Biographic data
- La voile noir (French)
- Bryant, Mark (2004). "Partner, Matriarch, and Minister: Mme de Maintenon of France, Clandestine Consort, 1680-1715". In Campbell Orr, Clarissa (ed.). Queenship in Europe 1660-1815: The Role of the Consort. Cambridge University Press. pp. 77–106. ISBN 0-521-81422-7.
- Stephens, Henry Morse (1911). "Maintenon, Françoise d'Aubigné, Marquise de". In Chisholm, Hugh (ed.). Encyclopædia Britannica. Vol. 17 (11th ed.). Cambridge University Press. pp. 442–444.
- Pritchard, James S. (2004). In search of empire : the French in the Americas, 1670-1730. Cambridge: Cambridge University Press. ISBN 978-0-5218-2742-3.
