= Siege of Guadeloupe =

1703 unsuccessful British siege

Coordinates: 16.2500°N 61.5830°W

- Part of War of the Spanish Succession
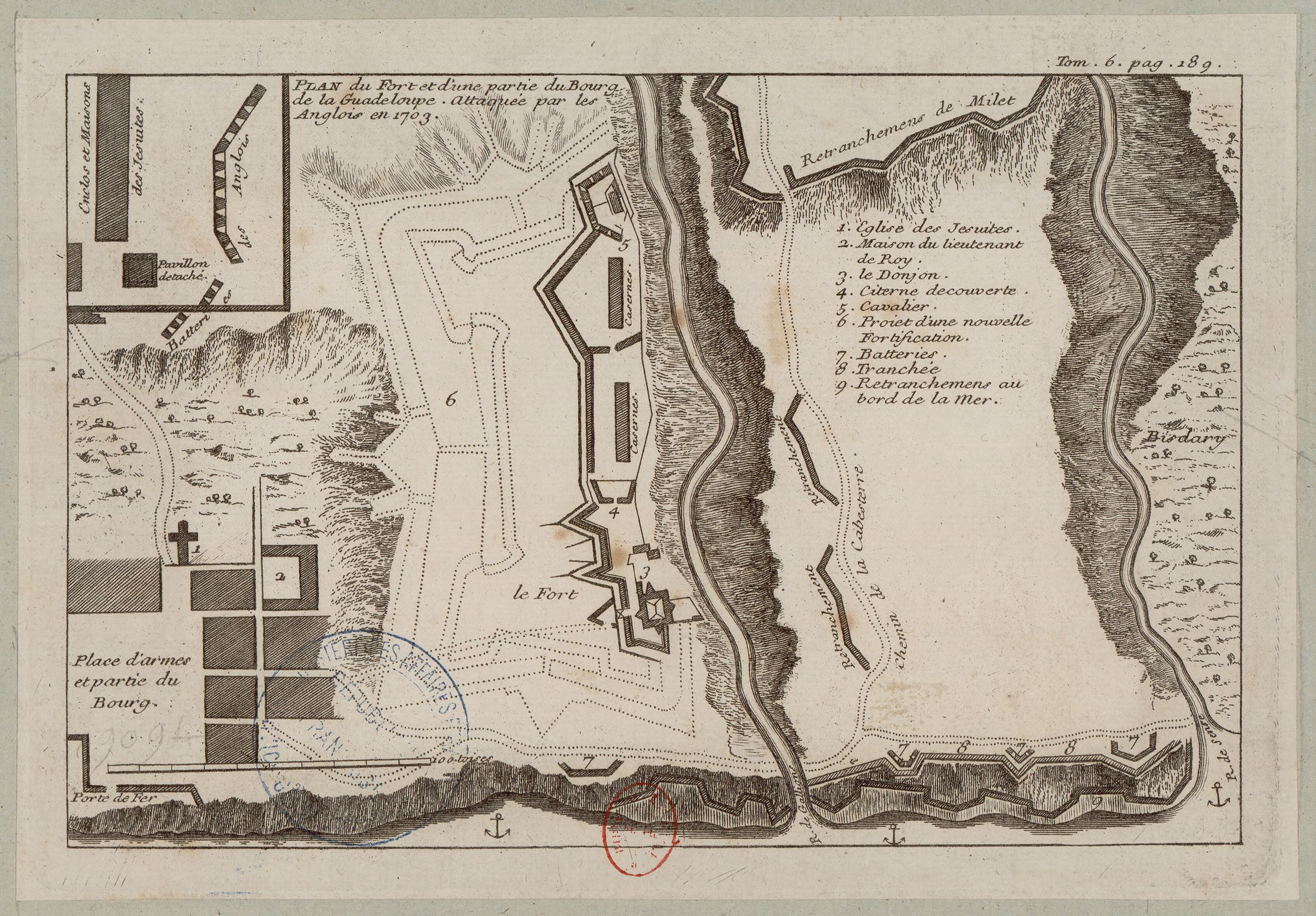
- Plan of the fort and part of the town attacked by the English in 1703
Date	19 March – 15 May 1703 (8 March to 4 May, O.S.)
Location	Guadeloupe, French West Indies
Result	French victory

Belligerents
France	England

Commanders and leaders
(Kingdom of France) Charles Auger (Kingdom of France) Nicolas de Gabaret	(Kingdom of England) Christopher Codrington (Kingdom of England) Charles Wills

Strength
1,000 – 1,800; 12 ships	4,000 troops and militia 45 ships

The siege of Guadeloupe took place from March to May 1703 during the War of the Spanish Succession, when an English expeditionary force led by Christopher Codrington landed on Guadeloupe in the French West Indies, and laid siege to the capital of Basse-Terre. Charles Auger, the French governor, received reinforcements from Martinique led by Nicolas de Gabaret. The latter opted for a Fabian strategy and scorched earth tactics, destroying resources and Fort St Charles in the process. A lack of supplies and heavy losses from disease forced the English to lift the siege in May.

== Siege ==
In March 1703, the English landed on the western part of Guadeloupe, in the French West Indies, near the main settlement of Basse-Terre. Codrington laid siege to Fort St Charles, held by a garrison under Charles Auger, while sending out parties of troops to burn and destroy houses, farms, works and plantations. They were also ordered to forage and plunder, because provisions were in short supply.

Reinforcements arrived from Martinique on 3 April, led by its governor Nicolas de Gabaret who took over command, and blew up the fort. He adopted scorched earth tactics, destroying resources before falling back into the interior, then harassing the English while disease and lack supplies reduced their strength. While highly unpopular with French plantation owners, it proved extremely effective.

By the end of April, disease began afflicting the soldiers ashore and Codrington was evacuated when he too fell ill. His deputy Charles Wills took over command and began evacuating the survivors in early May. Basse-Terre town was set ablaze as the fleet, taking captured guns, sailed on to St Christopher's Island.

== Sources ==
- Crouse, Nellis M (1943). The French Struggle for the West Indies, 1665-1713. New York: Columbia University Press. pp. 273–290.
- Handley, Stuart (2004). "Wills, Sir Charles (1666-1741)". Oxford Dictionary of National Biography (online ed.). Oxford University Press. doi:10.1093/ref:odnb/29604. (Subscription, Wikipedia Library access or UK public library membership required.)
- Pritchard, James (2003). In Search of Empire: The French in the Americas, 1670–1730. Cambridge University Press. ISBN 978-0521711111.
