= Bonnaventure-François de Boisfermé =

French colonial administrator

Governor of Marie-Galante
- In office 1 September 1696 – .
- Preceded by: Charles Auger; M. de Laurière
- Succeeded by: Charles de Brunier, Marquis de Larnage

Commander of Guadeloupe (interim)
- In office 1 May 1703 – 1705
- Preceded by: Charles Auger
- Succeeded by: Robert Cloche de La Malmaison

Commander of Martinique (interim)
- In office 1712–1713
- Preceded by: Jean-Pierre de Charitte

Governor of Grenada
- In office 1 December 1722 – 11 December 1722
- Preceded by: Jean Balthazar du Houx
- Succeeded by: Robert Giraut du Poyet

Personal details
- Born: 1661 Saint-Michel-sur-Loire, Indre-et-Loire, France
- Died: 11 December 1722 (aged 60–61) Martinique
- Occupation: Soldier, administrator

Bonnaventure-François de Boisfermé (1661 – 11 December 1722) was a French soldier and colonial administrator. He was commander or acting governor in Marie-Galante, Guadeloupe and Martinique. He was appointed governor of Grenada but died before taking office.

== Early years (1661–95) ==
Bonnaventure-François de Boisfermé was born in 1661 in Saint-Michel-sur-Loire, in what is now Indre-et-Loire. His family was of the old nobility. On 1 January 1691 he was a lieutenant of the artillery.

== Marie-Galante (1695–1702) ==
On 1 January 1695 Boisfermé was the king's lieutenant on Marie-Galante. Charles Auger, nominal governor of Marie-Galante, was named governor of Guadeloupe on 21 August 1695 and was replaced by a M. de Lauriére. Lauriére died soon after and Boisfermé was named to replace him as governor of Marie-Galante. He was appointed on 1 September 1696. To compensate Marie-Galante for the destruction that had been caused by the English, on 3 November 1699 the king free the island from all taxes for four years. Boisfermé held office until 1702.

== Guadeloupe (1702–05) ==
Boisfermé was commander in Guadeloupe from 8 November 1702. Marie-Galante was again taken and ruined by the English on 6 March 1703. On 19 March 1703, the English invasion fleet under Walker and Christopher Codrington was sighted off the south of Guadeloupe. Over the next few days the English disembarked over 4,000 troops at three landing points, forcing back the French defenders to Fort Saint Charles in Basse-Terre. On 3 April 1703, a French fleet arrived under Jean Gabaret, lieutenant general for the French Antilles, with 820 men from Martinique. The subordinate commanders included Boisfermé, Louis Gaston de Cacqueray de Valmenier, Jean Clair Dyel Du Parquet, François de Collart and Jean Du Buc. An attempt to hold Fort Francis failed and the French were forced to the east. Gabaret adopted scorched earth tactics, destroying resources before falling back into the interior, then harassing the English while disease, drink and lack of food reduced their strength. They abandoned Guadeloupe on 15 May 1703 after causing great material damage but few French casualties.

A royal decree of 1 May 1703 made Auger governor of Tortuga and the Coast of Saint-Domingue in place of Jean-Baptiste du Casse, squadron commander of the naval armies of America. Boisfermé was interim governor of Guadeloupe from 1703 to 1705.

== Last years (1705–22) ==
Islands in the Lesser Antilles

Boisfermé was succeeded in Guadeloupe in 1705 by Robert Cloche de La Malmaison. The French regained Marie-Galante in 1706. Boisfermé was made commander at Fort Royal, Martinique on 2 November 1705. He was interim commander of Martinique in the absence of a governor from 1712 to 1713. On 8 February 1712 in Fort Royal he married Catherine Le Boucher, widow of Emmanuel Nadau du Triel and mother of Charles François Emmanuel Nadau du Treil, future governor of Guadeloupe.

In letter of 20 May 1713 Jérôme Phélypeaux wrote that Boisfermé was the natural choice for governor of Marie-Galante, although he might not want to return, being mortified by the appointment of Malmaison as governor of Guadeloupe. He had excellent military qualities and had proved his loyalty by losing an arm in the service of the king. He had performed well as commander of Guadeloupe when Malmaison was lieutenant of the king. Boisfermé was appointed the commander of Marie-Galante on 1 August 1714. Charles de Brunier de Larnage was appointed royal lieutenant of Marie-Galante, taking office on 23 August 1714.

Boisfermé was made governor of Grenada on 1 December 1722. He succeeded Jean Balthazar du Houx, who had died on 29 August 1722. Boisfermé died in Martinique on 11 December 1722. He was succeeded in Grenada by Robert Giraut du Poyet, who held office from 1723 to 1727. Robert Philippe de Longvilliers de Poincy, captain general of Saint-Christophe, became the next governor of Marie-Galante.

== Sources ==
- Boisfermé, Bonnaventure François de (décédé en 1722) (in French), iREL: Archives nationales
- Boisfermé (Bonnaventure François de), gouverneur par intérim (in French), iREL: Archives nationales
- Boyer-Peyreleau, Eugene-Edouard comte (1823), Les Antilles françaises, particulièrement la Guadeloupe, depuis leur découverte jusqu'au 1er janvier 1823 (in French), Brissot-Thivars
- Cahoon, Ben, "Grenada", Worldstatesmen.org
- Cahoon (b), Ben, "Guadeloupe", Worldstatesment.org
- "de Salignac de La Mothe Fenelon", G.H.C. Bulletin (in French) (88), December 1996
- Marley, David (1998), Wars of the Americas: A Chronology of Armed Conflict in the New World, 1492 to the Present, ABC-CLIO, ISBN 978-0-87436-837-6
- Pritchard, Pritchard, James S. (2004-01-22), In Search of Empire: The French in the Americas, 1670–1730, Cambridge University Press, ISBN 978-0-521-82742-3
- Rennard, Joseph (1935), Tricentenaire des Antilles : Guadeloupe 1635-1935 (in French), Government of Guadeloupe
- Saint-Méry, Médéric Louis Élie Moreau de (1784), Loix et constitutions des colonies françoises de l'Amerique sous le vent... (in French), L'Auteur
