= Edward Le Bas =

British artist and art collector

Edward Le Bas RA (1904–1966) was a British artist and art collector.

== Biography ==
Le Bas was born in London and was the son of a wealthy steel magnate and the brother to the sculptor Molly Le Bas. Le Bas read architecture at Cambridge University in 1924. He studied for a short while in Paris before studying painting at the Royal College of Art in London from 1924. The family business provided him with a sizable private income which allowed him to travel and paint in Europe and North Africa while also building an art collection of his own. Highlights of his collection were shown as an exhibition, A Painter's Collection, at the Royal Academy in 1963, and received highly favourable reviews. Le Bas was a member of the Bequest Committee established by English sculptor Francis Leggatt Chantrey, which was designated to fund the purchase of fine paintings and sculptures produced in Britain. Le Bas's collection was described in one review as containing no depictions of violence and having works with a wide variety in comparative quality.

As an artist, Le Bas exhibited works, mostly interior scenes and flower works, at the Royal Academy, with the London Group, the New English Art Club and had solo shows at the Lefevre Gallery and the Michael Parkin Gallery. He was elected a member of the Royal Academy in 1953 and numerous public galleries in Britain, including the Tate, and in Australia and South Africa hold examples of his paintings.
