= Damian Le Bas =

English artist

- (undated)
- Born: 30 January 1963; Sheffield, England
- Died: 9 December 2017 (aged 54); Worthing, England
- Occupation: British artist

Damian Le Bas (30 January 1963 – 9 December 2017) was a British artist associated with the Outsider Art (or "Art Brut") label, as well a leading exponent of the "Roma Revolution" in art.

== Life ==
Le Bas was of Roma heritage. Le Bas attended the Royal College of Art.

He lived and worked with his wife, the Romany artist Delaine Le Bas, in West Sussex on the south coast. He was the father of writer Damian Le Bas.

== Collections ==
Since 1987 several of Le Bas' pieces are held in the Musgrave-Kinley Collection of works by key Outsider artists, administered by Monika Kinley, until her death in 2014. His more recent work is found, among others, in the collections of Perpetuum Mobile.

== Exhibitions ==
He exhibited frequently in the UK and Germany, and his works have been shown at Moderna Museet in Sweden, in Japan, France, Finland and the United States. He was well known in Outsider Art circles, and was exhibited as part of a survey-show of Art Brut at Malmö Konsthall in 1991. He was a participant of the Prague Biennale 3. He exhibited at the Raw Arts Festival.

In later years, the Traveller - Romani - Gypsy experience became a recurrent theme in his work. Le Bas was invited to participate in the 1st Roma Pavilion at the Venice Biennale in 2007. He subsequently became a driving force behind the Perpetual Romani-Gypsy Pavilion in Venice in 2009 and the co-initiator of the 4th Roma Pavilion which took place in Berlin in 2013.

He exhibited frequently in the UK and Germany, and his works have been shown in Japan, France, Finland, Sweden and in the United States.

- Malmö Konsthall, Malmö, Scania, Sweden, 1991. A survey-show of Art Brut.
- 1st Roma Pavilion at the Venice Biennale, 2007.
- Moderna Museet, Stockholm, Sweden
- Prague Biennale 3
