= Molly Le Bas =

British artist (1903–1996)

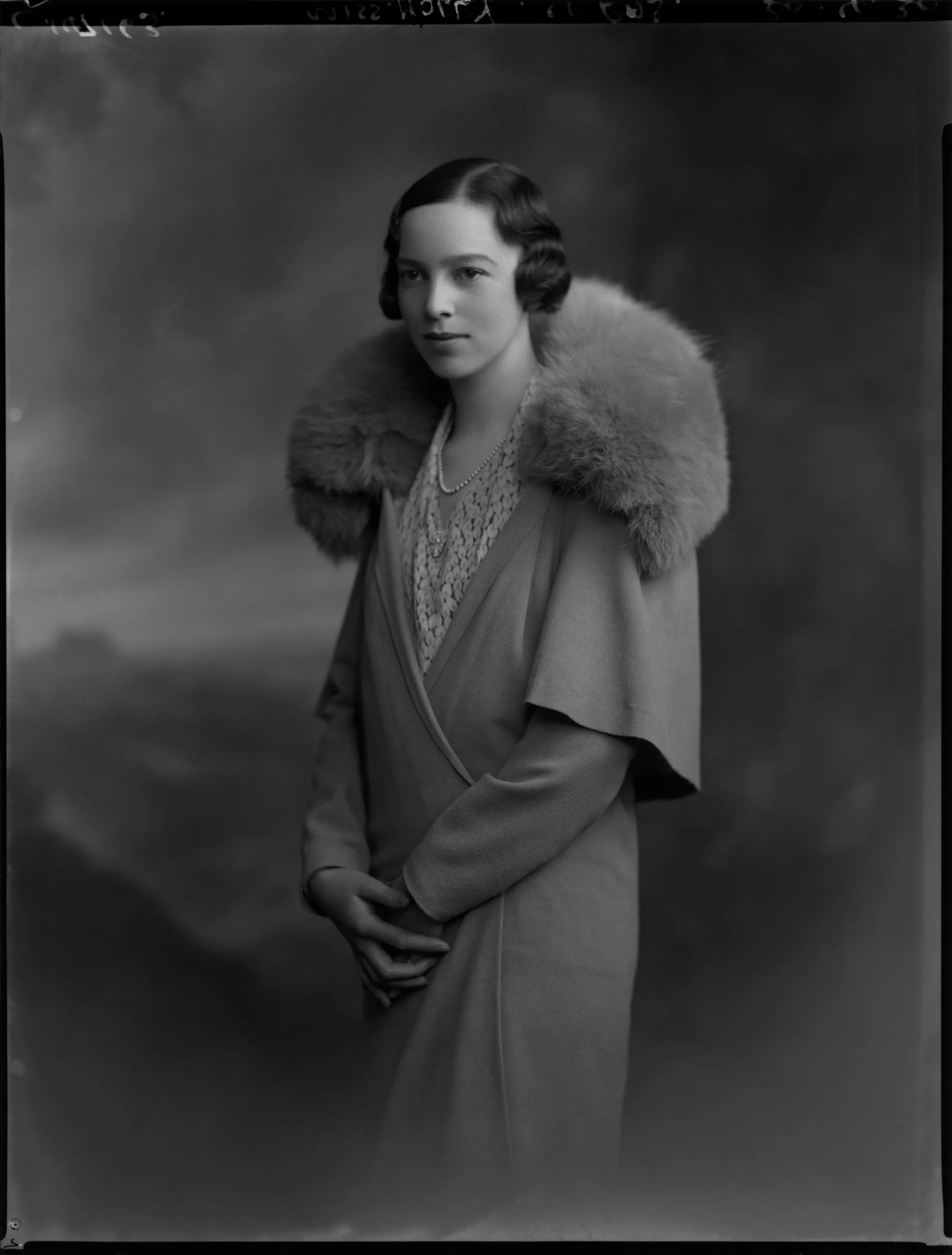
- Le Bas in 1930
- Born: 13 June 1903; Stoke Newington, London
- Died: 1996 (aged 92–93); London, England
- Education: Ecole des Beaux Arts
- Known for: Sculpture

Molly Rose Le Bas later Molly Brocas Burrows (13 June 1903 – 1996) was a British artist and sculptor.

== Biography ==
Le Bas was born in the Stoke Newington area of London, the daughter of an iron and steel magnate and the sister of the painter and collector, Edward Le Bas, (1904–1966). After a private education and time at Broomfield Hall, Molly Le Bas studied sculpture in Paris at the Ecole des Beaux Arts.

Le Bas exhibited statuettes and sculptures in bronze, stone and marble at the Royal Academy, the Walker Art Gallery in Liverpool, with the Royal Glasgow Institute of the Fine Arts and at the Paris Salon. She married Montagu Brocas Burrows in 1932 and after living in London, Le Bas lived at Angmering in West Sussex.
