= Campbell Dalrymple =

British military officer

Brigadier-General Campbell Dalrymple

Governor of Guadeloupe
- In office 5 June 1760 – 4 July 1763
- Monarch: Louis XV
- Preceded by: Byam Crump
- Succeeded by: François-Charles de Bourlamaque

Personal details
- Born: 27 August 1725
- Died: 21 April 1767 (aged 41)
- Occupation: Soldier

Campbell Dalrymple (27 August 1725 – 21 April 1767) was a British Army officer who was Governor of Guadeloupe during the British occupation of that island during the Seven Years' War. After Guadeloupe was returned to the French under the Treaty of Paris, he argued strongly for making Dominica a free trade area so as to capture the French Caribbean trade.

== Early years ==
Campbell Dalrymple was born on 27 August 1725. His parents were Hew Dalrymple (1690–1755) of Drummore and Anne Horn. His father, Sir Hew Dalrymple, Bart, was M.P. for North Berwick, Lord President of the Court of Session, and one of the Commissioners appointed to accomplish the Treaty of Union (1707). He married Margaret Douglas on 4 September 1753. One of their sons was Colonel George Dalrymple (1757–1801). Their third son was Major Hew Dalrymple. Campbell Dalrymple became Colonel of the 3rd Dragoons.

== Governor of Guadeloupe ==
Dalrymple was appointed Governor of Guadeloupe on 5 June 1760. He wanted to choose his own "civil establishment", but the Receiver General of the Revenue, Naval Officer in charge of enforcing the Navigation Acts, and Secretary and Register had already been appointed by the Duke of Newcastle and William Pitt. William Burke was Secretary and Register. Dalrymple reached Guadeloupe in September and took over from Lieutenant Governor Melville, who had acted as governor since the death of the former governor Byam Crump.

Dalrymple was one of the commanders of the British force that captured Roseau, Dominica on 6 June 1761. The British named a point on the island "Dalrymple's Point" in his honor, but the French people of the region did not accept the name and the point is now called Pointe Michel.

On 4 August 1761 Dalrymple wrote from Basse-Terre to Secretary-at-War Charles Townshend saying that his officers were "exposed to numerous hardships & inconveniences they knew nothing of in Europe." In November 1761 Dalrymple mustered a detachment from his garrison in Guadeloupe to join Robert Monckton's expedition against Martinique. He was only able to send 350 men due to lack of officers to lead them. In a letter to William Pitt of 18 November 1761 he said the King's Own Regiment had "a Lieut-Col & five Captains in England", but only one remaining captain, who was unfit for service and had to be replaced by a captain from one of the independent companies. He noted that 40 officers were absent from their units in Guadeloupe.

On 16 February 1762 Dalrymple wrote a 15-page memorandum on the government of Guadeloupe for the new king, George III of the United Kingdom. It covered the history of the archipelago, trade and finances, and problems that must be addressed after the peace treaty (when he assumed the island would become British). The last part covered military problems. In February 1763 Dalrymple wrote to the Earl of Bute, First Lord of the Treasury, making the case for creating free ports in Dominica to maintain trade with the islands of Guadeloupe and Martinique. He thought the planters and merchants of Guadeloupe and Martinique would thus be drawn into the British commercial system, and French trade in the Caribbean would be ruined. Dalrymple's views on Dominica's future as a trading post became official policy in 1765-6.

After Guadeloupe was returned to France under the Treaty of Paris, the French ships carrying the officials who would take charge in Guadeloupe, Martinique and Saint Lucia arrived in the Windward Islands in the middle of June 1763. Brigadier-General Dalrymple argued heatedly with his replacement, the Chevalier de Bourlamaque, over how the evacuation should be carried out. On 6 July 1763 he handed over to the French and withdrew to Dominica without the details have been agreed.

== Later career ==
Dalrymple was placed in charge of Dominica, where he tried to settle the British merchants who had come with him from Guadeloupe. He did not think Dominica could become a sugar colony, but it could do well "by such a kind of trade as the Dutch practised at St Eustatius". On 1 August 1763 Dalrymple allowed French ships to carry sugar duty-free to the port of Roseau, Dominica. This was clearly illegal, but had the purpose of regaining the economic advantage lost by the surrender of Guadeloupe, and of liquidating large debts owed to British merchants who had operated in Guadeloupe during the occupation.

Dalrymple wrote on 12 September 1763 to the Earl of Shelburne saying that the effect of making Dominica a free port would be "a great augmentation of trade and a total dependence of the French colonies on ours... In February my Ideas were doubtful, they are now confirmed by experience; at least both French and English give in to them with an eagerness, that proves their expectation of finding their private advantage. The Laws of Trade I know are contrary, and the constitution of Government usually established in our colonies will not favour this system; but the former, solid and judicious as they may be, are not immutable, and the latter is not absolutely necessary." Dalrymple returned to England in the autumn of 1763, but his successor, Captain Joseph Partridge, kept Port Roseau open to French traders until the end of January 1764.

Dalrymple died on 21 April 1767.

== Views ==
In A Military Essay (1761) Dalymple gave the opinion that firearms caused fewer injuries than edged weapons and were more humane, but a return to battles fought with the sword was possible. He wrote of recruiting in Britain in his day, saying some volunteers joined due to the "levity, accident, and dexterity of recruiting officers for them; by the second plan, the country gets clear of their banditti, and the ranks are filled up with the scum of every country, the refuse of mankind." Dalrymple was in favor of raising regiments on a county basis and encouraging the troops to take pride in the reputation and honor of their regiment. By treating them as intelligent beings they would become more efficient and would require less discipline. He was skeptical of attempts to reward honor, which he thought was not something conferred by wealth and privilege, but consisted of a soldier's ethic of duty, bravery and self-sacrifice. Rewards should be for distinguished service or extraordinary bravery.

== Publications ==
- Dalrymple, Campbell (1761), A Military Essay: Containing Reflections on the Raising, Arming, Cloathing, and Discipline of the British Infantry and Cavalry; with Proposals for the Improvement of the Same, D. Wilson

== Sources ==
- Brumwell, Stephen (9 January 2006), Redcoats: The British Soldier and War in the Americas, 1755-1763, Cambridge University Press, ISBN 978-0-521-67538-3
- Burke, John; Burke, Bernard (1847), The Patrician, E. Churton
- Goebel, Dorothy Burne (July 1963), "The "New England Trade" and the French West Indies, 1763-1774: A Study in Trade Policies", The William and Mary Quarterly, 20 (3), Omohundro Institute of Early American History and Culture: 332–372, doi:10.2307/1918952, JSTOR 1918952
- Honychurch, Lennox, History of Pointe Michel, Division of Culture, Dominica
- Lt.-Col. Campbell Dalrymple, Governor of Guadaloupe, Clan MacFarlane Australia
- Marshall, P. J. (4 July 2019), Edmund Burke and the British Empire in the West Indies: Wealth, Power, and Slavery, Oxford University Press, ISBN 978-0-19-884120-3
- Schnakenbourg, Christian (May–August 2016), "La Guadeloupe pendant la première administration britannique : le mémoire du gouverneur Dalrymple du 16 février 1762" (PDF), Bulletin de la Société d'Histoire de la Guadeloupe (in French) (174): 51, doi:10.7202/1037864ar
- Smelser, Marshall (1 December 2012), The Campaign for the Sugar Islands, 1759: A Study of Amphibious Warfare, UNC Press Books, ISBN 978-0-8078-3846-4
- Starkey, Armstrong (2003), War in the Age of Enlightenment, 1700-1789, Greenwood Publishing Group, ISBN 978-0-275-97240-0
- Walsh, Shirley (11 February 2011), "Campbell Dalrymple (1725-1767) Barbados, Caribbean", Genealogy.com
