= Robert Miguet =

French civil servant (1929–2019)

Robert Miguet (30 December 1929 – 3 September 2019) was a French civil servant.

Robert Miguet was born in Toulouse, Haute-Garonne on 30 December 1929. He was a student of the Lycée Pierre-de-Fermat in Toulouse, and a graduate of Institut d’études politiques de Toulouse (IEP Toulouse). Miguet died in Toulouse on 3 September 2019, at the age of 89.

== Career ==
- 1956-1958 (promotion 18 Juin) : École nationale d'administration (ENA)
- 1961-1962 : sub-prefect of Inini, French Guiana
- Sub-prefect of Lisieux in Lisieux City
- Sub-prefect of Bastia in Bastia City
- Sub-prefect of Montbéliard in Montbéliard City
- 28 February 1982 to 10 May 1982 : prefect of Guadeloupe
- 10 May 1982 to 13 February 1984 : commissioner of the Republic (name given to the prefects by the Socialist government at this time) of Guadeloupe
- 1984 - 18 June 1986 : commissioner of the Republic of Pyrénées-Orientales, Languedoc-Roussillon in Perpignan
- 18 June 1986 - 30 September 1987: commissioner of the Republic of Gard, Languedoc-Roussillon in Nîmes

== Honours and awards ==
- France Chevalier (Knight) (1984); officier of the Légion d’honneur (1995).
- France Commandeur of the ordre national du Mérite

== Works ==
- (in French) Robert Miguet, Chroniques de la vie préfectorale, 1958-1994, Phénix éditions, 2002, 378 p., ISBN 2-7458-0652-1
  No exemplary of this books in the Bibliothèque nationale de France (BNF) but an only exemplary in the Bibliothèque universitaire of the University of Antilles-Guyane.

== See also ==
- List of colonial and departmental heads of Guadeloupe

Political offices
Preceded by Guy Maillard	Prefect of Guadeloupe; 1982–1982	Succeeded by himself
Preceded by himself	Commissioner of the Republic of Guadeloupe; 1982–1984	Succeeded by Maurice Saborin
Preceded by	Commissioner of the Republic of Pyrénées-Orientales; 1984–1986	Succeeded by
Preceded by	Commissioner of the Republic of Gard; 1986–1987	Succeeded by
