= Charles Auger =

French colonial administrator

Charles Auger de La Motte

Governor of Marie-Galante
- In office 1686–1695
- Preceded by: Charles François d'Angennes
- Succeeded by: M. de Laurière

Governor of Guadeloupe
- In office 21 August 1695 – 1703
- Preceded by: Pierre Hincelin
- Succeeded by: Bonnaventure-François de Boisfermé (interim); Joseph d'Honon de Gallifet

Governor of Tortuga and Saint-Domingue
- In office 16 December 1703 – 13 October 1705
- Preceded by: Joseph d'Honon de Gallifet (intérim)
- Succeeded by: Jean-Pierre de Casamajor de Charritte (intérim)

Personal details
- Born: c. 1640 Saint Christophe
- Died: 13 February 1705 Léogâne, Saint Domingue
- Occupation: Colonial administrator

Charles Auger de La Motte (c. 1640 – 13 February 1705) was a French colonial administrator. He was governor in turn of Marie-Galante, Guadeloupe and Saint-Domingue.

== Career ==
=== Early years (1640–1683) ===
Charles Auger was born on Saint-Christophe around 1640. His parents were from Normandy, and had settled in Saint-Christophe in the 1630s. He entered the service of the Order of Malta, which owned the island, and became a knight of the order. He was appointed a surveyor on Saint Christophe and inspector of the island's fortifications.

Auger married Louise d'Angennes, daughter of Louis d'Angennes, Marquis de Maintenon. She was the sister of Charles François d'Angennes, Marquis de Maintenon. Auger was captured by Barbary pirates from the port of Salé, Morocco. After being released he embarked at the beginning of 1681 as a lieutenant aboard the king's frigate La Sorcière, commanded by his brother-in-law, the Marquis de Maintenon. He spent two years cruising in the Antilles seas.

=== Marie-Galante (1683–1692) ===
Auger was appointed king's lieutenant of Marie-Galante, just south of Guadeloupe, on 28 September 1683, and on 1 January 1686 became governor of Marie-Galante. He replaced the Marquis de Maintenon, who had spent only two months on the island during his three years in office. The Nine Years' War lasted from 1688 and 1697 and was fought by a coalition of states including the Dutch and English who were opposed to Louis XIV. Marie-Galante was abandoned in 1692 due to English raids, and Auger went to Martinique to help defend that island.

Islands in the Caribbean. Marie-Galante is 20km SE of Guadeloupe

=== Guadeloupe (1695–1703) ===
On 21 August 1695 Auger was appointed governor of Guadeloupe. He succeeded Pierre Hincelin, who had died the previous year. In January 1696 a convoy of merchant vessels reached Martinique loaded with supplies and munition, escorted by three warships. In March 1696 Auger left Saint-Pierre, Martinique on one of these ships to take up his post in Guadeloupe.

By early 1701 it was clear that another European war was imminent, since the Duke of Anjou had just become King Philip V of Spain, and the other powers of Europe would not allow one family to hold the crowns of France and Spain. (Note: The War of the Spanish Succession began in July 1701 and continued until August 1714.) In July 1701 the governor general of the French West Indies, Charles Desnotz, came to Guadeloupe to consult with Auger, and to urge him to immediately start preparations for war. He promised to give Auger all the assistance he needed. Desnotz died on 6 October 1701, and Charles de Pechpeyrou-Comminges de Guitaut became interim governor general. Charles-François de Machault de Belmont was appointed governor as of 1 July 1702. Machault finally presented his credentials to the sovereign council in Martinique on 24 March 1703.

On 19 March 1703 (8 March O.S. (Note: Another source says the English fleet arrived on 6 March 1703 O.S.)) a fleet of 45 vessels carrying 4,000 soldiers and militiamen under Christopher Codrington began the Siege of Guadeloupe. Auger, assisted by the friar and preacher Jean-Baptiste Labat, tried to organize the defense, but they were outnumbered. After two and a half weeks the English managed to take the fort in Basse-Terre. When he reached Martinique Machault found that the intendant François-Roger Robert was gathering reinforcements for Guadeloupe, which the English had invaded. 1,500 men volunteered, of whom 700 were chosen for the expedition. Nicolas de Gabaret, who was senior to Auger, was given overall command.

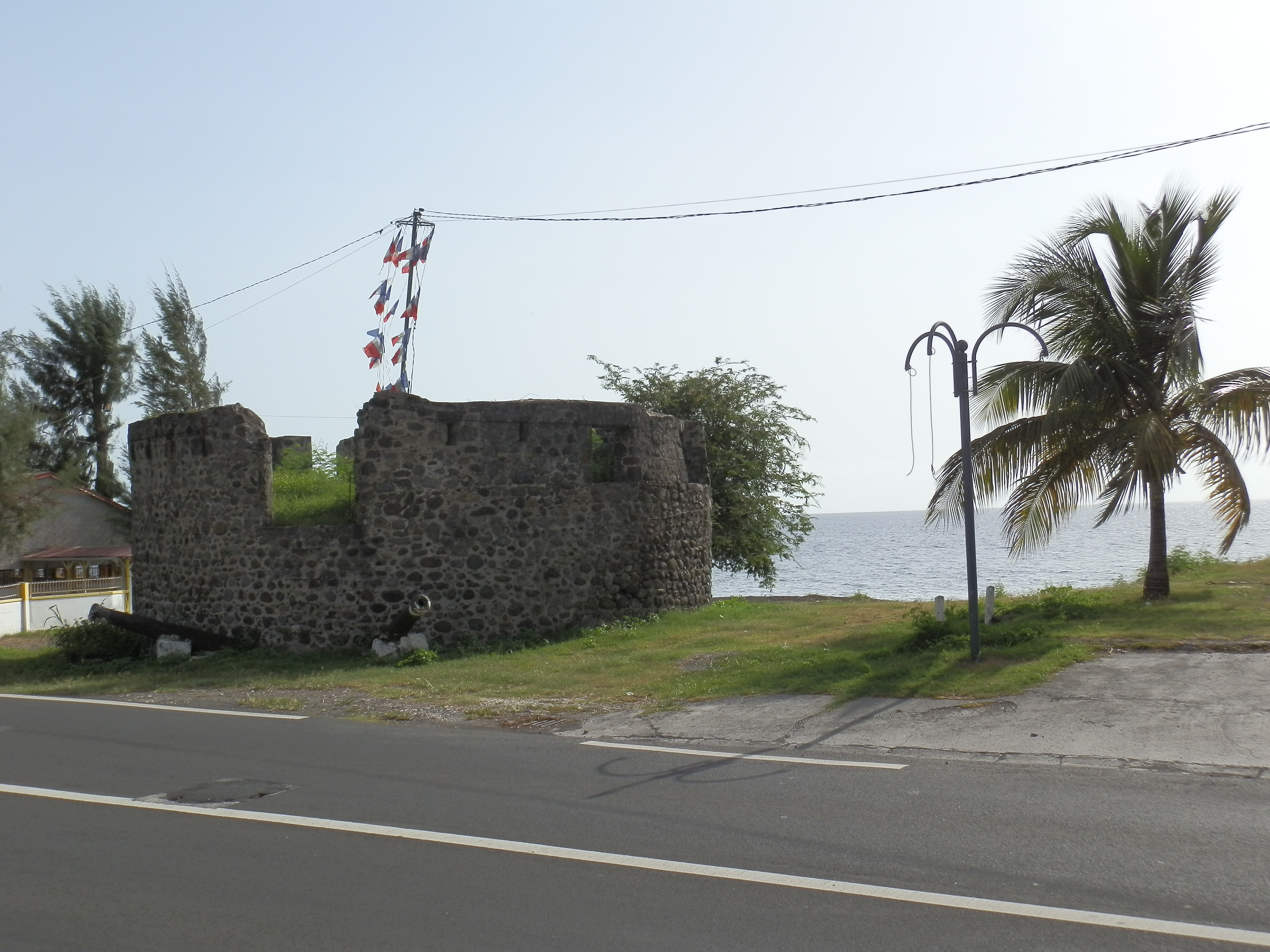
Tour du Père-Labat^{(fr)} in Basse-Terre, Guadeloupe

Nine barques, two ships and a brigantine (Trompeuse, Union, and Samaritaine) were used for transport, and left in the morning of 31 March 1703 escorted by two warships and a frigate that Machault had brought to the West Indies. Gabaret arrived in Guadeloupe on 3 April 1703. He pursued scorched earth tactics that proved effective in combination with the effect on the English of climate and drink. The English withdrew on 15 May 1703. Auger charged the Dominican Jean Baptiste Labat with building a defensive tower at Pointe-des-Pères for the coastal battery to protect the town of Basse-Terre. It was built from volcanic rock in 1703 at the entrance to the town of Baillif.

=== Tortuga (1703–1705) ===
Jean-Baptiste du Casse left Tortuga for France in 1700, where he was made squadron commander in the king's army. During his absence the sieur of Boissi Ramé commanded the colony, but he died soon after and Joseph d'Honon de Gallifet was named acting governor in his place. A royal decree of 1 May 1703 made Auger governor of Tortuga and the Coast of Saint-Domingue in place of Ducasse, squadron commander of the naval armies of America. He took office in November 1703. The decree appointing him was received in the council of Léogâne on 16 November 1703 and of Le Cap on 3 December 1703. Bonnaventure-François de Boisfermé was made acting governor of Guadeloupe.

Auger organized the defenses of Saint Domingue against the English, but quarrelled with one of his subordinates, the king's lieutenant (and former acting governor) Joseph d'Honon de Galiffet. Auger died in Léogâne on 13 February 1705. He was replaced by Jean-Pierre de Charitte as acting governor of Saint-Domingue.

== Sources ==
- Auger de La Motte, Charles (1640–1705) (in French), iREL: Archives nationales
- Cahoon, Ben, "Guadeloupe", Worldstatesmen.org
- Cahoon (b), Ben, "Haiti", Worldstatesmen.org
- Childs, John Charles Roger (1991), The Nine Years' War and the British Army, 1688–1697: The Operations in the Low Countries, Manchester University Press, ISBN 978-0-7190-3461-9
- Falkner, James (2015-10-30), The War of the Spanish Succession 1701-1714, Pen and Sword, ISBN 978-1-78159-031-7
- Guet, Isidore (1893), Origines De La Martinique : Le Colonel Francois de Collart et la Martinique de son temps : Colonisation, Sieges, Révoltes et Combats de 1625 a 1720, Vannes: Lafayole. Librairie Editeur
- Labat, R.P. (1742), Nouveau voyage aux isles de l'Amerique ... (in French), vol. 7
- Laprise, Raynald (2000–2006), "AUGER, le chevalier Charles", Figures de Proue : un dictionnaire biographique de la flibuste, Le Diable Volant
- Marcillac, Sidney Daney de (1846), Histoire de la Martinique: depuis la colonisation jusqu'en 1815 (in French), E. Ruelle
- Marley, David (1998), "High Tide of Empire (1700-1777)", Wars of the Americas: A Chronology of Armed Conflict in the New World, 1492 to the Present, ABC-CLIO, ISBN 9780874368376
- Pritchard, James S. (2004-01-22), In Search of Empire: The French in the Americas, 1670–1730, Cambridge University Press, ISBN 978-0-521-82742-3
- Saint-Méry, Médéric Louis Élie Moreau de (1784), Loix et constitutions des colonies françoises de l'Amerique sous le vent... (in French), L'Auteur
- St Benoit, Angel (26 September 2016), Jean-Baptiste Labat et sa tour à Baillif (in French), Maisons Créoles
