= Delaine Le Bas =

English artist

Delaine Le Bas (born 1965) is a British artist from a Romani background.

== Biography ==
Le Bas told the Travellers' Times that "I actually liked going to school which was difficult because I am the only one out of five of us that finished school. And then I had ideas about going to Art College." She said that until starting school she had been sheltered from how racist people can be towards Gypsy Traveller people.

Delaine Le Bas has shown her art extensively both in the UK and internationally, including at the International Festival of Singular Art, Roquevaire, France; the American Visionary Art Museum in Baltimore, U.S., Transition Gallery and the 2005 and 2007 Prague Biennales. In June 2007 her work was included in the first Roma pavilion of the 2007 Venice Biennale. She took part in the Summer 2007 Prague Biennale. Le Bas participated in ROUNDTABLE: The 9th Gwangju Biennale, which took place 7 September – 11 November 2012 in Gwangju, Korea.

Le Bas has had several solo exhibitions, including "Room" at Transition Gallery in London; "The House of the JuJu Queen" at Galerie Giti Nourbaksch, Berlin, and at Galleria Sonia Rosso, Turin. Her work has been called 'magpie-like', featuring intricate embroidery and installations made up of various objects and ornaments.

Her work moves expansively from a unique series of thematic departures including nationhood, race, gender and relationships. These issues are explored through freely combined media. Embroidery, painting and decoupage/"femmage" interact with sculpture and installations that reflect domestic claustrophobia, the transient nature of modern materiality and the tensions that characterise Le Bas' own experience as a Gypsy. The boundary between embellished objects and recovered items re-deposited within the installation is deliberately tested and blurred. Tapestries adorned with the Artist's own stitching and brushmarks arte confronted by items with a less unequivocal history.

In the publicity for the First Roma Pavilion at Venice in 2007, Le Bas was quoted as saying: "As a Romany, my viewpoint has always been that of the outsider and this position of the 'other' is reflected in the materials and messages within my work. We live in a culture of mixed values and garbled messages. My works are crafted from the disregarded and disparate objects of the car boot sale and the charity shop."

For an installation in 2014, Le Bas recreated 'containment compounds' used to control Gypsy families by British authorities at the start of the 20th century.

In 2017 she told The Guardian that “Most Roma art is held in storage, gathering dust in basements of museums... Most artists are either ignored altogether or, as Gypsies, we’re visible only in a highly negative way.”

Le Bas and her husband Damian Le Bas have been associated with Outsider Art, unconventional artists working outside the confines of the art establishment.

Nominated for the 2024 Turner Prize "for her presentation Incipit Vita Nova. Here Begins The New Life/A New Life Is Beginning at Secession, Vienna." Alongside Jasleen Kaur, Claudette Johnson and Pio Abad. Her installation for the 2024 Turner Prize came under scrutiny for suspected plagiarism of an earlier work by Edgeworth Johnstone.

November 2024 — Named one of Three To Watch, Hotly tipped female talent of the British art scene by Harper's Bazaar in their annual art supplement, alongside Bianca Raffaella and fellow Turner Prize nominee Jasleen Kaur.

== Publications ==
Year	Publication	Contribution	Publisher
2021	Wagtail: The Roma Women's Poetry Anthology, edited by Jo Clement	'Wagtails', Drawings in Indian ink	Butcher's Dog Publishing, Newcastle, UK
