= 1997 Nevis Island Assembly election =

- 24 February 1997

All 5 elected seats in the Nevis Island Assembly
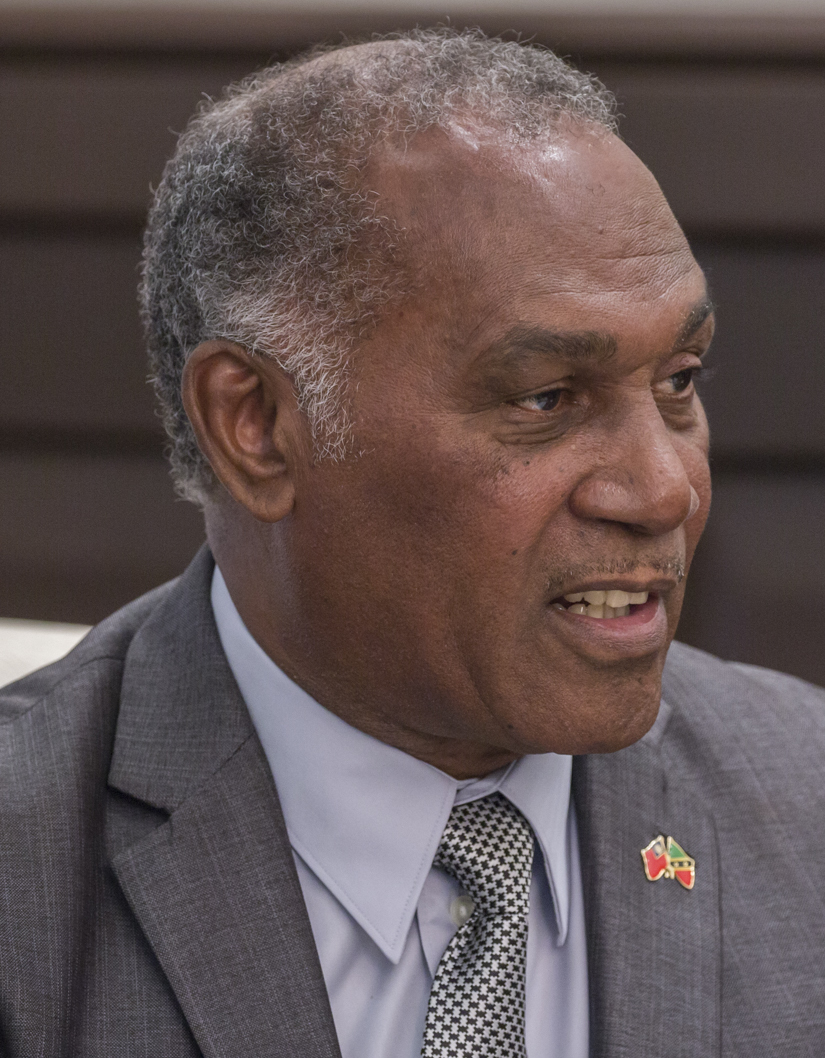

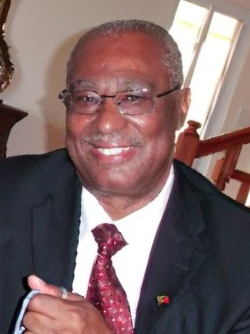
	First party	Second party
Leader	Vance Amory	Joseph Parry
Party	CCM	NRP
Last election	3	2
Seats won	3	2
Seat change	Steady	Steady
Premier before election
Vance Amory
CCM
Premier after election
Vance Amory
CCM

An election was held in Nevis on 24 February 1997 to elect all five of the elected members of the Nevis Island Assembly. The Premier of Nevis, Vance Amory, had called an early election for the assembly in order to seek a mandate for an independence referendum for Nevis, with previous attempts in 1996 being blocked by the opposition Nevis Reformation Party in the assembly. The election saw Vance Amory’s party, the Concerned Citizens' Movement (CCM), retain their majority with three of five seats, while the Nevis Reformation Party (NRP) remained in opposition with 2 out of 5 seats.

== Elected members ==
The following members were elected for the five assembly constituencies:

District	Elected members	
District	Party	Member
1-Saint Paul	NRP	Victor Jay Martin
2-Saint Johns	CCM	Malcolm Guishard
3-Saint George	CCM	Vance Amory
4-Saint James	CCM	Jean Harris
5-Saint Thomas	NRP	Joseph Parry

== Aftermath ==
The election saw no change to the political makeup of the assembly, and the CCM once again had a majority to form the government. Premier Vance Amory claimed the election victory had given him a mandate to pursue independence, and in October 1997 the assembly unanimously approved plans for an independence referendum, which was held in 1998 and was unsuccessful.
