= 1987 Nevis Island Assembly election =

- 14 December 1987

All 5 elected seats in the Nevis Island Assembly
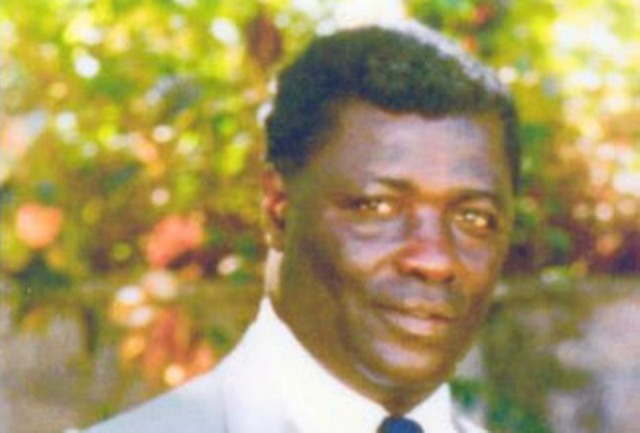

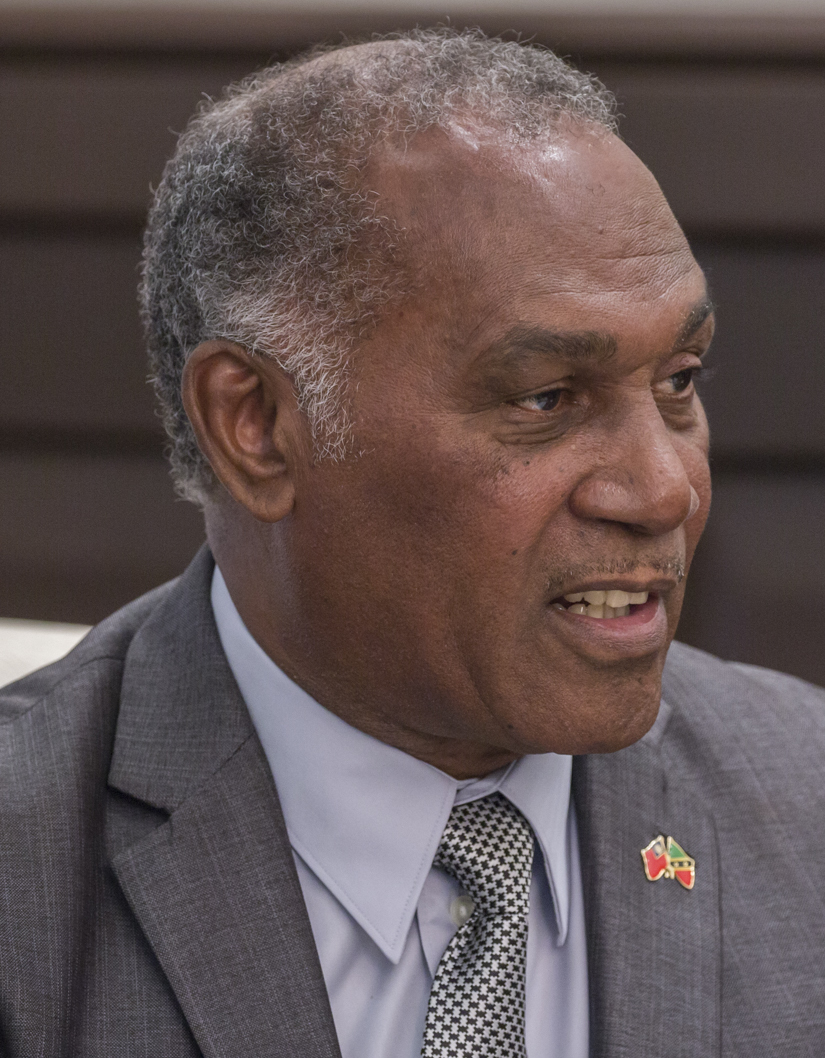
| | First party | Second party |
|---|---|---|
| Leader | Simeon Daniel | Vance Amory |
| Party | NRP | CCM |
| Last election | 5 | Didn't exist |
| Seats won | 4 | 1 |
| Seat change | ▼1 | New |
Premier before election
Simeon Daniel
Nevis Reformation Party
Premier after election
Simeon Daniel
Nevis Reformation Party

Elections were held in Nevis on 14 December 1987 to elect members of the Nevis Island Assembly. The Nevis Reformation Party (NRP), led by Premier Simeon Daniel, remained in power after winning four of five available seats.

== Background ==
In November 1987, Premier Simeon Daniel dissolved the Nevis Island Assembly and called an early election. Prior to the dissolution, Daniel's Nevis Reformation Party (NRP) held all five seats in the assembly since the 1983 election. The election date was confirmed as 14 December 1987.

There were a total of 14 candidates who put themselves forward for the election, with both the NRP and Concerned Citizens' Movement (CCM) standing in all five seats, while the Nevis National Party (NNP) stood three candidates, and the People's Democratic Party (PDP) put forward one candidate.

== Result ==
The result was a landslide victory for the NRP, who held power after winning four of five seats. This was the first election the recently founded CCM contested, with the party under Vance Amory's leadership coming second with one of five seats and 38% of the vote.

== Aftermath ==
On 15 December, the next day following the election, the Governor-General officially re-appointed Simeon Daniel as Premier of Nevis and the NRP to form the Nevis Island Administration. The Governor-General also declared the day a public holiday to celebrate the NRP's victory.
