= Hazel Brandy-Williams =

Nevisian politician

Junior Minister in the Nevis Island Administration
- In office 2013–2022
- Premier: Vance Amory; Mark Brantley

Senator of the Nevis Island Assembly
- In office 2013–2022

Personal details
- Party: Independent; Concerned Citizens' Movement (formerly)

Hazel Brandy-Williams is a Nevisian politician who from 2013 until 2022 served in the Nevis Island Administration as a government minister and in the Nevis Island Assembly as a senator.

== Early life and career ==
Brandy-Williams completed a BA in Finance at the University of the Virgin Islands and later completed an MSc in Risk Management & Financial Services from the University of Glasgow. She proceeded to work in various civil service roles in Nevis from 1988 until 2013.

== Political career ==
Brandy-Williams was first appointed by Concerned Citizens' Movement leader and Premier of Nevis Vance Amory to serve in the Nevis Island Administration (NIA) in January 2013 as the Junior Minister for Gender, Social Affairs, Social Development, Youths and Sports Affairs, Community Affairs, Import and Export Control, and Licensing Unit. She was also appointed as a senator in the Nevis Island Assembly.

In March 2017, Brandy-Williams was nominated and later confirmed as party Chairperson of the Concerned Citizens' Movement. In December 2017, she was re-appointed to the NIA as Junior Minister in the Premier's Ministry with responsibility for Health and Gender Affairs. She resigned as a Senator shortly before the 2022 Nevis Island Assembly election.

In October 2026, Brandy-Williams announced that she would be running in the next National Assembly election as an independent candidate for the Nevis 10 (Gingerland) constituency.
