= Jean Harris (politician) =

Nevisian politician

Jean Harris, also known as Jean Nisbett-Harris, is a former Nevisian politician from the Concerned Citizens' Movement.

== Political career ==
Harris was first elected as a Concerned Citizens' Movement (CCM) member of parliament of the Nevis Island Assembly in the 1997 election, representing the Saint James Windward Parish/constituency #4. Following her election, she became the first woman to ever be elected to the Nevis Island Assembly. She also served as a Minister for Health, Gender and Social Affairs in the Nevis Island Administration. She was re-elected as an MP in the 2006 election, however during this time the CCM went into opposition after losing to the Nevis Reformation Party. She did not run again at the 2011 election, with Alexis Jeffers instead being the CCM candidate for constituency 4 and successfully being elected to the seat.
