= Christine Springette =

Nevisian public servant and politician

Christine Springette is a Nevisian public servant who is a former President of the Nevis Island Assembly.

== Education career ==
Springette formerly worked in education, including as a headteacher of a school, and later became an Education Advisor to the Joseph Parry-led Nevis Island Administration.

== Nevis Island Assembly ==
In September 2011, Springette was nominated by Premier Joseph Parry to serve as President of the Nevis Island Assembly and was unanimously elected by the assembly members in attendance at the first sitting following the 2011 election, although the Opposition boycotted this sitting due to contesting the result and bringing forward a legal challenge. In August 2012, Springette was part of a delegation to the inauguration ceremony of the OECS Assembly held in Antigua.

Following the 2013 election, the Clerk of the House, Farrel Smithen was elected unopposed to the position of President of the Nevis Island Assembly. In December 2013, Springette and previous assembly members were awarded at a special sitting for their past service to the assembly.
