= Spencer Brand =

Spencer Brand is a Nevisian politician who is a member of the Nevis Island Assembly and is a minister in the Nevis Island Administration.

== Political career ==
In the 2013 Nevis Island Assembly election, Brand ran as the Concerned Citizens' Movement (CCM) candidate for the Saint Paul parish/Nevis #1 constituency, losing to Robelto Hector of the Nevis Reformation Party (NRP). He ran for the same seat in the 2017 election, this time beating Hector by just 11 votes. Following the election, he was appointed to the Cabinet of the Nevis Island Administration (NIA) as Minister of Labour, Public Works, Physical Planning, Posts and the Environment.

He was re-elected at the 2022 election by an increased but still slim margin of 27 votes, and was re-appointed to the NIA Cabinet as Minister of Communications, Works, Water Services, Physical Planning and Environment, Posts, Labour, and Disaster. From 9 to 11 June 2025, he served as Acting Premier of Nevis following Premier Mark Brantley needing to travel abroad on official duties.
