= 2011 Nevis Island Assembly election =

- 11 July 2011

5 of the 8 seats in the Nevis Island Assembly
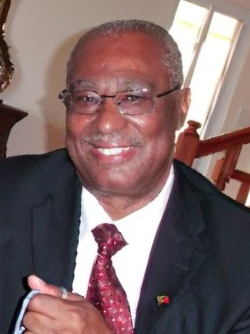

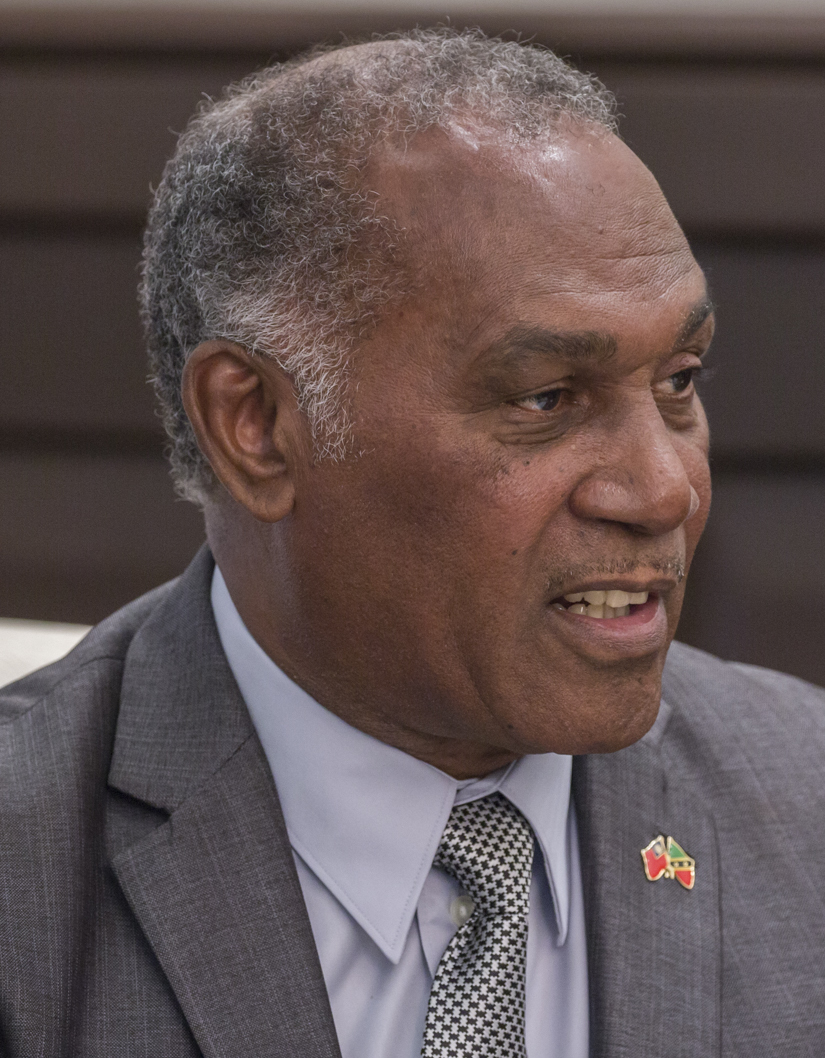
	First party	Second party
Leader	Joseph Parry	Vance Amory
Party	NRP	CCM
Seats won	3	2
Popular vote	3,761	3,722
Percentage	50.26%	49.74%
- Results by constituency.
Premier before election
Joseph Parry
NRP
Premier after election
Joseph Parry
NRP

Island Assembly elections were held in Nevis on 11 July 2011 to elect five members of the Nevis Island Assembly.

The result was a win for the Nevis Reformation Party (NRP), led by Joseph Parry, which won three of the five seats. The opposition Concerned Citizens' Movement (CCM) won two seats.

== Results ==
Party	Votes	%	Seats
Nevis Reformation Party	3,761	50.26	3
Concerned Citizens' Movement	3,722	49.74	2
Appointed members			3
Total	7,483	100.00	8
Valid votes	7,483	99.65	
Invalid/blank votes	26	0.35	
Total votes	7,509	100.00	
Registered voters/turnout	9,260	81.09	
Source: NationNews, Organization of American States

=== By parish ===
St Paul's
Party	Candidate	Votes	%
NRP	Robelto Hector	822	57.0%
CCM	Michael Perkins	619	43.0%
Total votes		1,441	

St John's
Party	Candidate	Votes	%
NRP	Hensley Daniel	1,358	50.3%
CCM	Mark Brantley	1,344	49.7%
Total votes		2,702	

St George's
Party	Candidate	Votes	%
CCM	Vance Amory	753	75.4%
NRP	Patricia Hanley	246	24.6%
Total votes		999	

St James'
Party	Candidate	Votes	%
CCM	Alexis Jeffers	833	51.1%
NRP	Patrice Nisbett	800	48.9%
Total votes		1,629	

St Thomas'
Party	Candidate	Votes	%
NRP	Joseph Parry	535	75.6%
CCM	Keith Scarborough	173	24.4%
Total votes		708	
