= 2001 Nevis Island Assembly election =

- 7 September 2001

all 5 elected seats in the Nevis Island Assembly
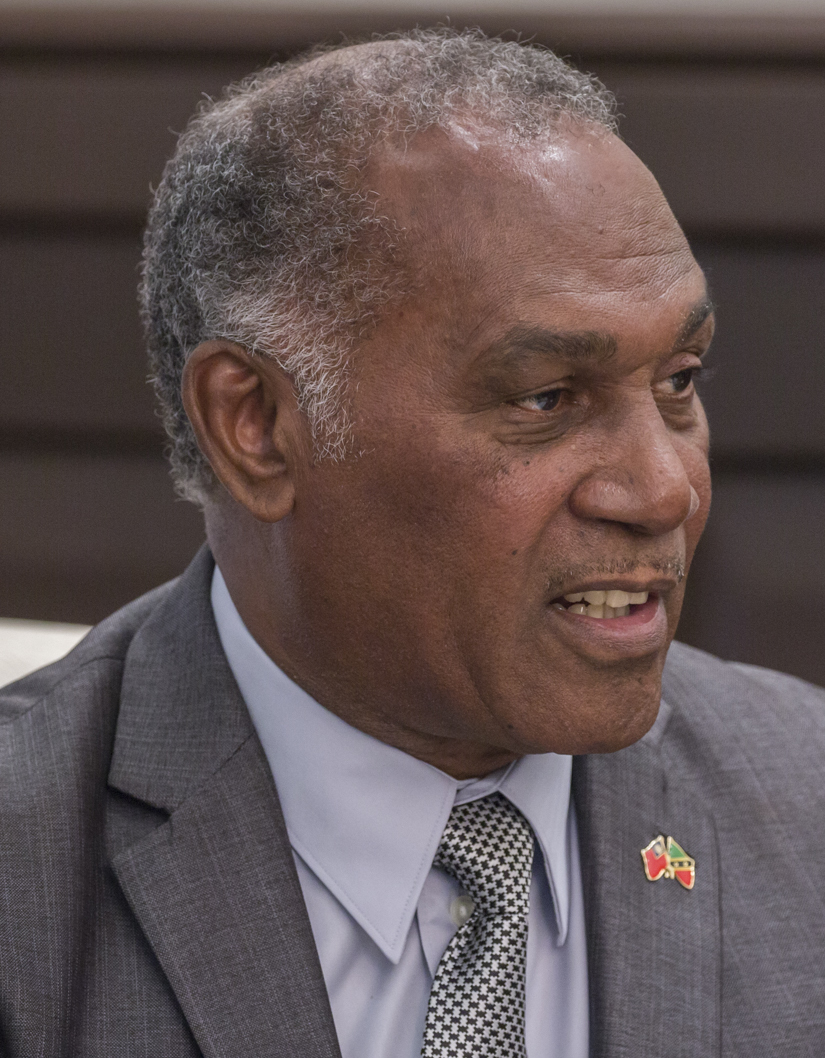

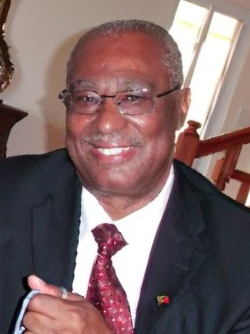
	First party	Second party
Leader	Vance Amory	Joseph Parry
Party	CCM	NRP
Last election	3	2
Seats won	4	1
Seat change	▲1	▼1
Premier before election
Vance Amory
CCM
Premier after election
Vance Amory
CCM

Elections were held in Nevis on 7 September 2001 to elect all five of the elected members of the Nevis Island Assembly. The ruling party, the Concerned Citizens' Movement (CCM), increased their representation from three to four out of five seats, while the Nevis Reformation Party (NRP) lost one seat to the CCM.

== Aftermath ==
This was the first election for the Nevis Island Assembly since the unsuccessful referendum on secession in 1998. Following the 2001 election, Vance Amory remained as Premier and the CCM were again returned to power, and in 2003, Amory unsuccessfully sought another referendum on independence.
