= Collin Tyrell =

Former Nevisian politician

Collin Tyrell MBE

Junior Minister in the Nevis Island Administration
- In office 1992–1997
- Premier: Vance Amory

Senator of the Nevis Island Assembly
- In office 1992–1997

Personal details
- Party: Concerned Citizens' Movement

Collin D. A. Tyrell MBE is a former politician from Nevis who was a junior minister in the Nevis Island Administration from 1992 to 1997.

== Career ==
In 1983, Tyrell started working for the Nevis Island Administration as a civil servant. Following the 1992 Nevis Island Assembly election, Tyrell was appointed a nominated member (senator) of the Nevis Island Assembly and a junior minister in the Nevis Island Administration (NIA). He served in these positions until 1997.

In 2006, he was sworn in as a solicitor and barrister for the local bar at the High Court in Charlestown, Nevis.

In 2018, Tyrell was appointed Special Advisor to the NIA Ministry of Sports, Youth and Culture. Prior to this, he had been the NIA's Legal Advisor for almost five years.

In the 2021 New Year Honours, Tyrell was appointed a Member of the Most Excellent Order of the British Empire (MBE) "for services to the community."
