= 2013 Nevis Island Assembly election =

- 22 January 2013

5 of the 8 seats in the Nevis Island Assembly
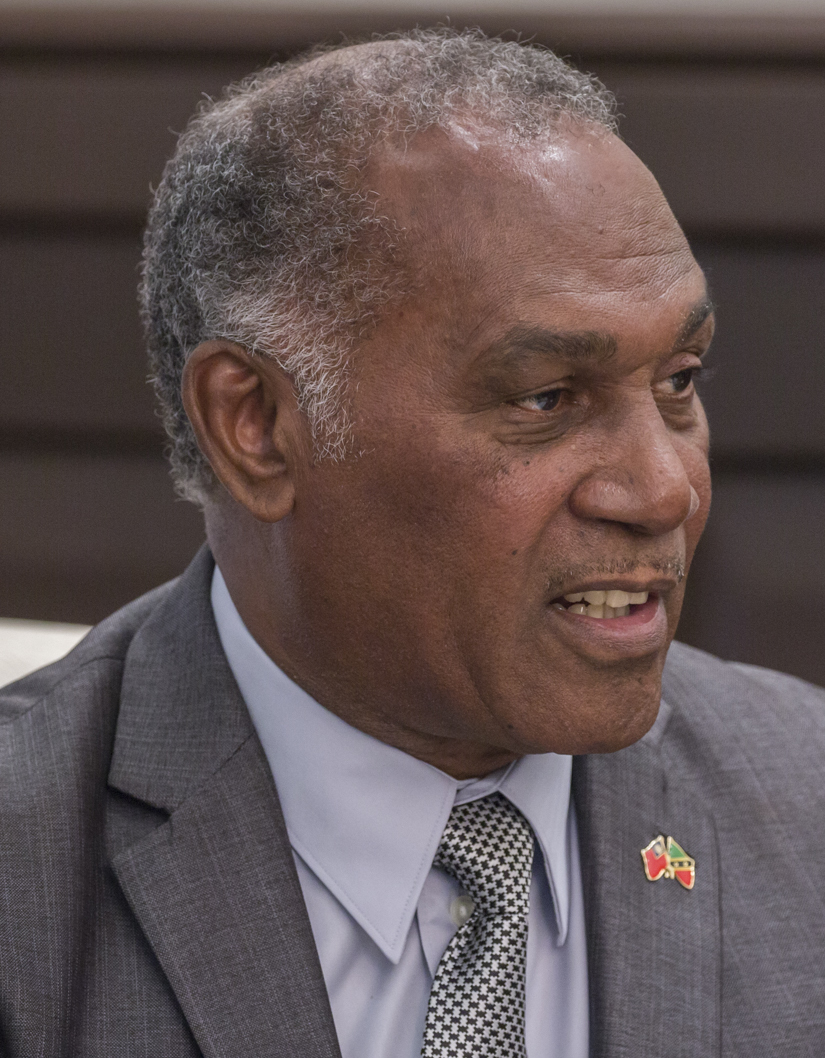

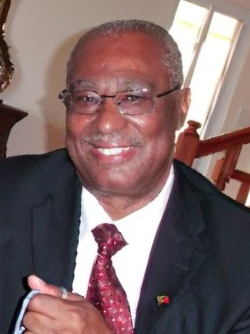
	First party	Second party
Leader	Vance Amory	Joseph Parry
Party	CCM	NRP
Last election	49.77%, 2 seats	50.23%, 3 seats
Seats won	3	2
Seat change	▲1	▼1
Popular vote	4,092	3,512
Percentage	53.81%	46.19%
Swing	▲4.04pp	▼4.04pp
- Results by constituency.
Premier before election
Joseph Parry
NRP
Premier after election
Vance Amory
CCM

Island Assembly elections were held in Nevis on 22 January 2013 to elect five members of the Nevis Island Assembly.

The result was a win for the Concerned Citizens' Movement (CCM), led by Vance Amory, which won three of the five seats. The opposition Nevis Reformation Party (NRP) won two seats.

== Results ==
Party	Votes	%	Seats
Concerned Citizens' Movement	4,092	53.81	3
Nevis Reformation Party	3,512	46.19	2
Appointed members			3
Total	7,604	100.00	8
Valid votes	7,604	99.42	
Invalid/blank votes	44	0.58	
Total votes	7,648	100.00	
Registered voters/turnout	10,150	75.35	
Source: NIA

=== By parish ===
St Paul's
Party	Candidate	Votes	%
NRP	Robelto Hector	730	53.3%
CCM	Spencer Brand	639	46.7%
Total votes		1,369	

St John's
Party	Candidate	Votes	%
CCM	Mark Brantley	1,584	54.1%
NRP	Hensley Daniel	1,344	45.9%
Total votes		2,928	

St George's
Party	Candidate	Votes	%
CCM	Vance Amory	713	78.5%
NRP	Patricia Hanley	195	21.5%
Total votes		908	

St James'
Party	Candidate	Votes	%
CCM	Alexis Jeffers	980	56.3%
NRP	Patrice Nisbett	760	43.7%
Total votes		1,740	

St Thomas'
Party	Candidate	Votes	%
NRP	Joseph Parry	483	73.3%
CCM	Keith Scarborough	176	26.7%
Total votes		659	
