= Latoya Jones =

Nevisian politician

Latoya Biyanca Jones is a Nevisian politician serving as a Senator and Deputy Speaker of the National Assembly since 2022.

== Political career ==
In October 2022, she was appointed to the National Assembly as an Opposition Senator by the Concerned Citizens' Movement (CCM), who form the official opposition. In November 2022, she was confirmed as Deputy Speaker of the National Assembly, becoming the first Nevisian woman to ever serve in the role.

Prior to entering parliament, she was a special advisor to Concerned Citizens' Movement leader and Premier of Nevis, Mark Brantley.

In the December 2022 Nevis Island Assembly election, she unsuccessfully contested the 5th constituency for the CCM, losing to the Nevis Reformation Party's Cleone Stapleton-Simmonds.
