= Patrice Nisbett =

Saint Kitts and Nevis politician

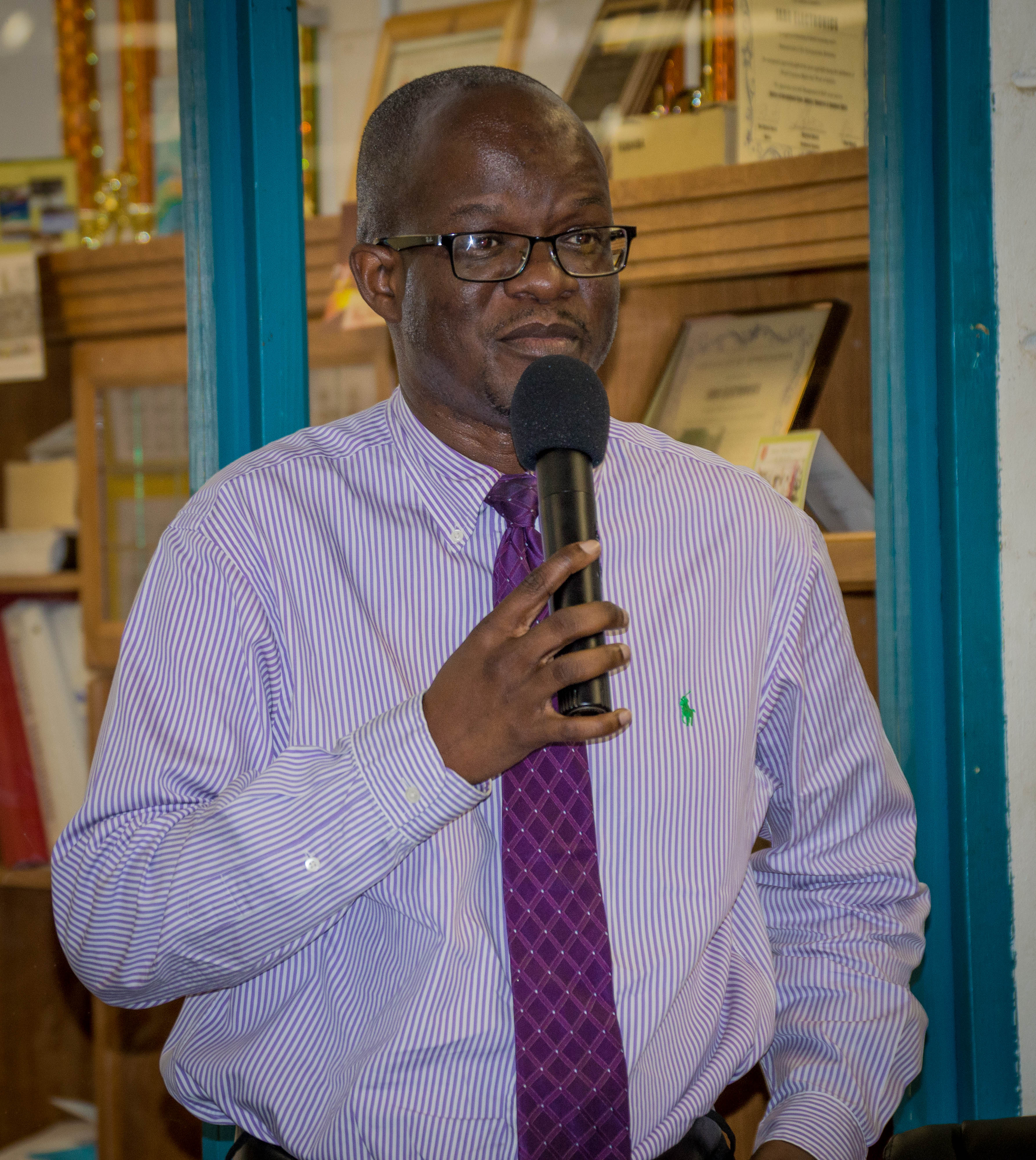

Foreign Minister of Saint Kitts and Nevis
- In office February 2013 – February 2015
- Prime Minister: Denzil Douglas

Attorney General of Saint Kitts and Nevis
- In office February 2010 – January 2013
- Prime Minister: Denzil Douglas

Personal details
- Born: 5 September 1971 (age 55)
- Party: Nevis Reformation Party
- Education: University of the West Indies, Hugh Wooding Law School

Patrice Nisbett (born 5 September 1971) is a Nevisian politician and lawyer. He was a Nevis Reformation Party member of the National Assembly from 2000 to 2020, and served as a cabinet minister from 2010 to 2015.

== Early life and education ==
Nisbett was born in Saint James Windward Parish, Nevis, on 5 September 1971. From 1990 to 1993, he studied law at the University of the West Indies, and from 1993 to 1995 attended the Hugh Wooding Law School.

== Career ==
In 1995, he qualified as a barrister-at-law in Saint Kitts and Nevis and practiced law with the Nisbett law firm until 2006.

In the 2000 general election, Nisbett was elected to the National Assembly as a Nevis Reformation Party (NRP) candidate for the constituency consisting of the Saint James Windward and Saint Thomas Lowland parishes. In the 2001 Nevis Island Assembly election, he unsuccessfully ran for election to the Nevis Island Assembly, losing to Jean Harris.

He was re-elected to the National Assembly in the 2004 general election, and was then appointed as Deputy Speaker of the National Assembly. He sought election to the Nevis Island Assembly in the 2006 Nevis election but was unsuccessful.

In the 2010 general election, Nisbett was re-elected to the National Assembly. In February 2010, Nisbett was appointed by the prime minister, Denzil Douglas, to serve in the Labour-led government as Minister of Justice and Legal Affairs and Attorney General of Saint Kitts and Nevis. In the 2011 and 2013 Nevis Island Assembly elections, Nisbett unsuccessfully stood for election to the Nevis Island Assembly.

In January 2013, he stopped serving in the federal government as Attorney General but remained as Justice and Legal Affairs minister. In February 2013, he was then also appointed as Minister of Foreign Affairs, Homeland Security and Labour.

In the 2015 election, Nisbett held onto his seat, however, the Labour-NRP government lost to the Team Unity alliance and were returned to the opposition. In 2016, the NRP passed a resolution stopping party members from holding elected office in both the National Assembly and Nevis Island Assembly, preventing Nisbett from being able to contest the following Nevis Island Assembly election.

In the 2020 general election, he lost his seat to Alexis Jeffers of the Concerned Citizens' Movement. As of June 2024, Nisbett was listed as a legal practitioner with an active practicing certificate.
