= Farrel Smithen =

Former President of the Nevis Island Assembly

President of the Nevis Island Assembly
- In office 26 March 2013 – 18 January 2023
- Premier: Vance Amory; Mark Brantley
- Succeeded by: Michelle Slack-Clarke

Farrel Smithen is a Nevisian former public servant who was the President of the Nevis Island Assembly from 2013 to 2023.

== Nevis Island Assembly ==
From 1997 to 2013, Smithen was the Clerk of the House for the Nevis Island Assembly. Following the 2013 Nevis Island Assembly election, Smithen was elected unopposed by the assembly to serve as President of the Nevis Island Assembly. He was again elected unopposed to the position after the 2017 election.

In January 2023, shortly after the 2022 election, Smithen was succeeded by Michelle Slack-Clarke as President of the Nevis Island Assembly. Since leaving the role, Premier Mark Brantley reported that Smithen was remaining as a consultant to support the work of the Assembly and his successor.
