= Janice Daniel-Hodge =

Saint Kitts and Nevis businesswoman and politician

The Honourable Janice Daniel-Hodge

Leader of the Nevis Reformation Party
- Incumbent
- Assumed office September 2020
- Preceded by: Robelto Hector

Member of the Nevis Island Assembly
- Incumbent
- Assumed office 19 January 2023
- Preceded by: Alexis Jeffers
- Constituency: District 4 (Saint John's parish)

Personal details
- Party: Nevis Reformation Party
- Relatives: Simeon Daniel (father)

Janice Daniel-Hodge (born 17 April 1962 in England) is a businesswoman, politician and environmental consultant from Saint Kitts and Nevis.

== Career ==
She graduated from St. Francis College in New York with a degree in biology. In 1987 she also acquired a degree from Alabama A&M University in microbiology. She also has a degree from the University of the Virgin Islands. She was a director and chairperson of The Bank of Nevis Ltd. from 2006 to 2016, and is currently a director at The Bank of Nevis International, Ltd.

In September 2020, she became the first female leader of a political party in the country, leading the Nevis Reformation Party (NRP). In 2021, she departed from the Bank of Nevis International to focus on her responsibilities as the NRP leader.

She led her party into the Saint Kitts and Nevis general election and the Nevis Island Assembly election in 2022.

In the 2022 Nevis Island Assembly election, she was elected as the member of the Nevis Island Assembly for District 4 (Saint James' parish), gaining the seat from the Concerned Citizens' Movement's Alexis Jeffers. She was sworn into office on 19 January 2023.

== Family ==
She is the daughter of the former Premier of Nevis Simeon Daniel.
