= 1983 Nevis Island Assembly election =

Nevis Island Assembly elections

- 22 August 1983

All 5 elected seats in the Nevis Island Assembly
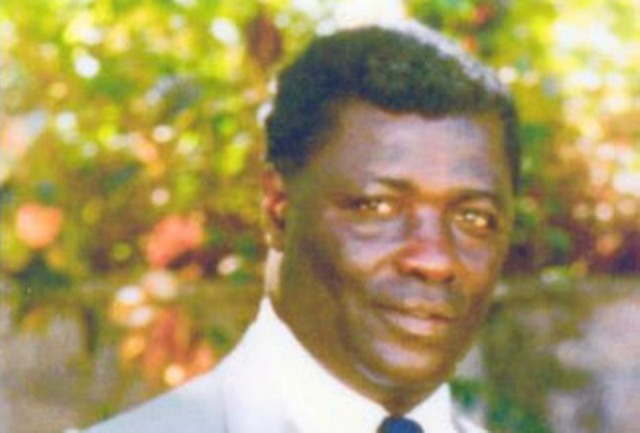
	First party
Leader	Simeon Daniel
Party	NRP
Seats won	5
Popular vote	1,614
Percentage	89.4%
Premier after election
Simeon Daniel
Nevis Reformation Party

An election was held in Nevis on 22 August 1983 to elect members of the Nevis Island Assembly. This was the first election for the newly established assembly, and was held ahead of Saint Kitts and Nevis becoming independent from the United Kingdom in September 1983, with the Nevis Island Assembly taking office following independence.

== Results ==
The election saw the Nevis Reformation Party (NRP) win a landslide victory, securing all five seats. The NRP were unopposed in two seats, while in three they were opposed by the People's Democratic Party (PDP), who received minimal support and subsequently lost their deposits, and also were opposed in one of them (St John) by the Nevis Independent Party (NIP).

Party	Votes	%	Seats
Nevis Reformation Party	1,614	89.37	5
People's Democratic Party	96	5.32	0
Nevis Independent Party	96	5.32	0
Total	1,806	100.00	5
Valid votes	1,806	99.50	
Invalid/blank votes	9	0.50	
Total votes	1,815	100.00	
Registered voters/turnout	2,955	61.42	

=== By parish ===
Saint Paul Charlestown/District 1
Party	Candidate	Votes	%
NRP	Ivor Stevens	390	91.1
PDP	Theodore Hobson	38	8.9
Rejected ballots		1	
Total votes		429	

Saint John Figtree/District 2
Party	Candidate	Votes	%
NRP	Levi Morton	527	79.7
NIP	Myrna Walwyn	96	14.5
PDP	Zephaniah Liburd	38	5.7
Rejected ballots		8	
Total votes		669	

Saint George Gingerland/District 3
Party	Candidate	Votes	%
NRP	Uhral Swanston	697	97.2
PDP	Frederick Smithen	20	2.8
Rejected ballots		0	
Total votes		717	

Saint James Windward/District 4
Party	Candidate	Votes	%
NRP	Arthur Evelyn	Unopposed	

Saint Thomas Lowland/District 5
Party	Candidate	Votes	%
NRP	Simeon Daniel	Unopposed	

== Aftermath ==
On 19 September, the day of independence for the federation, NRP leader Simeon Daniel was sworn in as Premier of Nevis. The assembly's first sitting was a throne speech from the Deputy Governor-General for Nevis in October 1983.
