= Michelle Slack-Clarke =

President of the Nevis Island Assembly

The Honourable Michelle Slack-Clarke

President of the Nevis Island Assembly
- Incumbent
- Assumed office 19 January 2023
- Premier: Mark Brantley
- Preceded by: Farrel Smithen

Personal details
- Education: University of the West Indies; Norman Manley Law School; University of London

Michelle Jan Slack-Clarke is a Nevisian attorney and public servant who is the current President of the Nevis Island Assembly.

== Legal career ==
In 2013, Slack-Clarke graduated from the University of the West Indies with an undergraduate law degree. She then attended the Norman Manley Law School. In 2021, while working as an Associate Attorney-At-Law at Daniel, Brantley and Associates law firm, she received a Chevening Scholarship to study a Master of Laws in Drafting Legislation, Regulation and Policy at the University of London. Slack-Clarke is currently a partner of the Walwyn, Slack-Clarke and White law firm.

== Nevis Island Assembly ==
Following the 2022 Nevis Island Assembly election, Slack-Clarke was announced as the new President of the Nevis Island Assembly (the presiding officer/speaker of the assembly). She was officially sworn into the role in the assembly term's first sitting on 19 January 2023.
