= Robelto Hector =

Nevis Island politician

Leader of the Nevis Reformation Party
- In office 21 October 2018 – September 2020
- Preceded by: Joseph Parry
- Succeeded by: Janice Daniel-Hodge

Member of the Nevis Island Assembly
- In office July 2006 – December 2017
- Succeeded by: Spencer Brand
- Constituency: St Paul / Nevis Electoral District 1

Personal details
- Born: 19 December 1967 (age 58)
- Party: Nevis Reformation Party

Robelto Hector (born 19 December 1967) is a former Nevisian politician who was leader of the Nevis Reformation Party from October 2018 until September 2020.

== Career ==
In 2004, Hector was called to the bar in Saint Kitts and Nevis, and later operated his own law firm.

In the 2006 Nevis Island Assembly election, Hector was elected a member of the Nevis Island Assembly. He served in the assembly until the 2017 election, when he lost his seat of St Paul's by 11 votes.

He was minister of communications, works, public utilities, posts, physical planning, natural resources and environment, agriculture, lands, housing, co-operatives and fisheries during the administration of Joseph Parry.

In October 2018, Hector was elected as leader of the NRP at the party's conference, succeeding Joseph Parry. Hector was succeeded in the party leadership by Janice Daniel-Hodge in September 2020.
