= Joseph Parry (politician) =

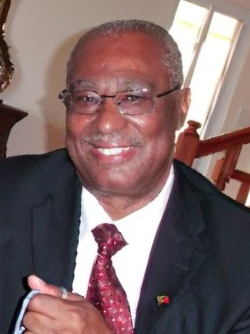

3rd Premier of Nevis
- In office 11 July 2006 – 23 January 2013
- Preceded by: Vance Amory
- Succeeded by: Vance Amory

Leader of the Nevis Reformation Party
- In office 1992–2018
- Preceded by: Simeon Daniel
- Succeeded by: Robelto Hector

Personal details
- Born: Cotton Ground, Saint Thomas Lowland Parish, Nevis
- Party: Nevis Reformation Party

Joseph Walcott Parry was born in Cotton Ground, educated in Charlestown Secondary School and obtained a Bachelor of Arts degree in History and Economics at the University of the West Indies.

Parry served as President of Nevis Cricket association for over ten years, as Nevis representative on the Leeward Islands Cricket Association for six years and represented Leeward Islands Cricket Association on the West Indies Cricket Board of Control.

== Personal achievements ==
Joseph Parry spent most of his civil career as a teacher at the Charlestown Secondary School.

On December the 31st 2009, Nevispages reported Joseph Walcott Parry as the "Man of the Year 2009".

In the private sector, Parry is a founding member and chairman of the Bank of Nevis Mutual Fund.

== Political achievements ==
Parry was minister of planning, development, tourism, housing and labour from 1987 to 1992. He became the leader of Nevis Reformation Party in 1992. Following the 1993 elections, he was appointed as Minister of Trade, Industry and Tourism in the minority government with People's Action Movement.

Parry was Premier of Nevis from July 2006 to January 2013.

In the 10 July 2006 Island Assembly election, Parry's NRP won three out of five seats, ending the 14-year rule of the Concerned Citizens' Movement (CCM). In the 11 July 2011 Island Assembly election, Parry's NRP again won three out of five seats and was return to office for a second term. In the 22 January 2013 Island Assembly election, Parry's NRP won two out of five seats and therefore was succeeded as Premier by Vance Amory. Parry stepped down from party leadership in 2018.

Joseph Parry was responsible for establishing the social security office and is considered to be responsible for the Nevis Civil service structure after Nevis' independence in 1983.
