= 1998 Nevis independence referendum =

10 August 1998
- Outcome: Failed as two-third quorum in favour not met

Results
Choice	Votes	%
Yes	2,427	61.83%
No	1,498	38.17%
Valid votes	3,925	99.75%
Invalid or blank votes	10	0.25%
Total votes	3,935	100.00%
Registered voters/turnout	6,785	58%

An independence referendum was held in Nevis on 10 August 1998. Although it was approved by 62% of voters, a two-thirds majority was necessary for the referendum to succeed. If it had passed, Nevis would have seceded from the Federation of Saint Kitts and Nevis.

== Background ==
A previous unofficial independence referendum was held in Nevis on 18 August 1977. The Nevis Reformation Party organised the referendum, seeking for the island of Nevis to separate from St Kitts prior to independence and remain within the British Empire as a separate crown colony, similar to Anguilla, which had seceded from Saint Christopher-Nevis-Anguilla in 1967. Although 99.7% had voted in favour of independence, the result was declared invalid by the national government.

== Results ==
Choice	Votes	%
For	2,427	61.83
Against	1,498	38.17
Total	3,925	100.00
Valid votes	3,925	99.75
Invalid/blank votes	10	0.25
Total votes	3,935	100.00
Registered voters/turnout	6,785	58.00
Source: Direct Democracy
