= Nevis Reformation Party =

- Leader: Janice Daniel-Hodge
- Deputy leader: Patricia Bartlette
- Founded: 1 August 1970
- Headquarters: NRP Party Headquarters, Nelson Spring, St. Thomas’ Parish, Nevis
- Ideology: Nevisian interests Regionalism; Federalism; Autonomism
- Slogan: Peace, Progress, Prosperity
- National Assembly (Nevisian Seats): 0 / 3
- Nevis Island Assembly: 1 / 5

Website
- nrp2020.com

The Nevis Reformation Party is a Nevis-based political party in Saint Kitts and Nevis. The party currently holds none of the eleven seats in the National Assembly. It is the main opposition party on Nevis, currently holding one of five seats in the Nevis Island Assembly. Since 2020, the NRP has been led by businesswoman and environmental consultant Janice Daniel-Hodge, the first woman to lead a political party in the country and daughter of former Premier of Nevis Simeon Daniel.

== History ==
The party was established on 1 August 1970. They first contested national elections in 1971 when they received 7.7% of the national votes and won a single seat. In the 1975 elections the party's vote share rose to 16.2%, and NRP won both Nevisian seats available. After winning 16.0% of the vote in the 1980 elections they again won two seats and became part of the People's Action Movement-led coalition government. In 1984 their vote share fell to 10.1% but they increased their representation to three seats. They were reduced to two seats in 1989. The first leader of the party, Simeon Daniel, retired in 1992. The party won only one seat in 1993. The party retained their single seat in elections in 1995, 2000, 2004, 2010, and 2015. In 2010, NRP representative Patrice Nisbett joined the federal cabinet as Attorney General of Saint Kitts and Nevis. At the 2020 election, Nisbett lost his constituency to CCM's Alexis Jeffers and the NRP failed to win any other seats in Nevis, the first time in the party's history that they hadn't won any seats at a national election. The NRP were again left without representation in the National Assembly following the 2022 snap election in which CCM held onto their three seats.

=== Nevis Island Assembly ===
In 2006, the party won the Nevis Island Assembly elections, taking three of the five seats and ending the 14-year rule of the Concerned Citizens' Movement. In the 2011 elections, they remained in power after winning three seats again.

The party have been in opposition since losing the 2013 Nevis Island Assembly election. At the 2017 election they were reduced to just one seat. At the 2022 elections, they increased their vote by 4% and gained a seat, increasing their representation to 2 of 5 Assembly seats. However, in May 2023, Cleone Stapleton-Simmonds was formally expelled as an NRP member after disagreements with Janice Daniel-Hodge over who should become Leader of the Opposition, meaning the NRP are currently only represented by one member, Daniel-Hodge, in the Nevis Island Assembly.

== Leadership ==
Until 2020, the party has had four leaders: Simeon Daniel (1970–1992), Joseph Parry (1992–2018), Robelto Hector (2018–2020) and Janice Daniel-Hodge (since 2020).

== Election results ==
=== National Assembly ===
Election	Leader	Votes	%	Nevis seats	+/–	Status
1971	Simeon Daniel	1,127	7.7 (#3)	1 / 2	▲1	Opposition
1975	Simeon Daniel	1,987	16.2 (#3)	2 / 2	▲1	Opposition
1980	Simeon Daniel	2,356	16.0 (#3)	2 / 2	Steady	Coalition
1984	Simeon Daniel	1,830	10.1 (#3)	3 / 3	▲1	Coalition
1989	Simeon Daniel	1,948	10.9 (#3)	2 / 3	▼1	Coalition
1993	Joseph Parry	1,641	8.5 (#4)	1 / 3	▼1	Coalition
1995	Joseph Parry	1,521	7.0 (#4)	1 / 3	Steady	Opposition
2000	Joseph Parry	1,710	7.8 (#4)	1 / 3	Steady	Opposition
2004	Joseph Parry	1,688	7.5 (#4)	1 / 3	Steady	Opposition
2010	Joseph Parry	2,539	9.8 (#4)	1 / 3	Steady	Coalition
2015	Joseph Parry	3,276	10.8 (#4)	1 / 3	Steady	Opposition
2020	Robelto Hector	2,232	8.0 (#5)	0 / 3	▼1	Extra-parliamentary
2022	Janice Daniel-Hodge	2,616	8.91 (#5)	0 / 3	Steady	Extra-parliamentary

=== Nevis Local Council ===
Election year	Party leader	# of votes	% of vote	# of seats won	+/–	Govt?	Ref.
1971	Simeon Daniel			6 / 9	New	Majority	
1975	Simeon Daniel	Unopposed	N/A	9 / 9	▲3	Majority	
1979	Simeon Daniel	2,493	86.2% (#1)	9 / 9	Steady	Majority	

=== Nevis Island Assembly ===
Election year	Party leader	# of votes	% of vote	# of seats won	+/–	Govt?	Ref.
1983	Simeon Daniel	1,614	89.4% (#1)	5 / 5	New	Government	
1987	Simeon Daniel			4 / 5	▼1	Government	
1992	Simeon Daniel			2 / 5	▼2	Opposition	
1997	Joseph Parry			2 / 5	Steady	Opposition	
2001	Joseph Parry			1 / 5	▼1	Opposition	
2006	Joseph Parry	2,894	48.7% (#2)	3 / 5	▲2	Government	
2011	Joseph Parry	3,761	50.3% (#1)	3 / 5	Steady	Government	
2013	Joseph Parry	3,512	46.2% (#2)	2 / 5	▼1	Opposition	
2017	Joseph Parry	2,864	43.3% (#2)	1 / 5	▼1	Opposition	
2022	Janice Daniel-Hodge	3,543	47.2% (#2)	2 / 5	▲1	Opposition	
