= Mark Brantley =

Premier of Nevis

The Honourable Mark Brantley
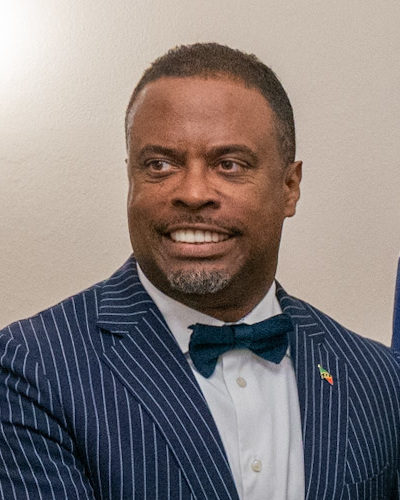
- Brantley in 2020

5th Premier of Nevis
- Incumbent
- Assumed office 19 December 2017
- Monarchs: Elizabeth II; Charles III
- Preceded by: Vance Amory

Minister of Foreign Affairs
- In office 22 February 2015 – 10 May 2022
- Prime Minister: Timothy Harris
- Preceded by: Patrice Nisbett
- Succeeded by: Vincent Byron

Leader of the Opposition
- Incumbent
- Assumed office 10 October 2022
- Preceded by: Denzil Douglas
- In office 2007–2015
- Preceded by: Malcolm Guishard
- Succeeded by: Denzil Douglas

Personal details
- Born: 11 January 1969 (age 57) Saint George Gingerland Parish, British West Indies
- Party: Concerned Citizens' Movement
- Other political affiliations: Team Unity (2013-2022)
- Education: University of the West Indies; Norman Manley Law School; University of Oxford (St Catherine's College)
- Occupation: Politician, lawyer

Mark Anthony Graham Brantley (born 11 January 1969) is the Premier of Nevis, Leader of the Opposition in the National Assembly and former Minister of Foreign Affairs for St Kitts and Nevis. On May 10, 2022, Dr Timothy Harris, having lost the support of the elected majority to function as Prime Minister and facing a historic Motion of No Confidence in the National Parliament, decided to dissolve the Parliament and purported to revoke the appointment of more than 50% of his former Cabinet, including Brantley. Brantley previously served as the leader of the opposition in the National Assembly of Saint Kitts and Nevis (2007 – 2015). He is married and has 2 daughters. Brantley studied law at the University of the West Indies, obtained his Legal Education Certificate of Merit from Norman Manley Law School in Jamaica and also holds a Bachelor of Civil Law from the University of Oxford, St. Catherine College. Prior to entering politics, Brantley worked as an attorney.

== Career ==
=== Legal career ===
Brantley is a lawyer by profession and has acted in several notable cases involving international litigation. He attended secondary school at Charlestown Secondary School. He completed his higher education at the University of the West Indies where he graduated with a Bachelor of Laws, Upper Second Class Honors. He then attended the Norman Manley Law School where he received a Legal Education Certificate of Merit. He completed his studies at St Catherine's College, a college of the University of Oxford in the United Kingdom (which he attended as a Commonwealth Scholar) where he completed a Bachelor of Civil Law. Brantley has been admitted to the bar in St Kitts and Nevis, Anguilla, Grenada, Antigua and Barbuda and Dominica.

=== Political career ===
Brantley serves as a member of the National Assembly, representing the conservative, Nevis-based Concerned Citizens' Movement. He served as the Minister of Foreign Affairs in the St. Christopher and Nevis Federal Government from 2015 until 2022. He was formerly the Deputy Premier of the Nevis Island Administration and held the portfolio of Minister of Tourism, Health, Culture, Youth, Sports, and Community Development in that government. From 2007-2015 he served as the leader of the opposition in the National Assembly. He hosts a weekly two hour political talk-show on VON Radio 860AM.

On 29 October 2017, Nevis Premier and Leader of the CCM Vance Amory stepped down, with Brantley winning the leadership roles at the CCM party convention. On 18 December 2017 his party won the election. He became the fourth Premier of Nevis on 19 December 2017.

He led his party to victory in the 2017 Nevis Island Assembly election, with the CCM winning 4 of the 5 seats. He currently serves as the Premier of Nevis with a number of ministry roles on the Nevis Island Administration.

He was appointed as leader of the opposition in the National Assembly on 10 October 2022.

== Personal life ==
Brantley is married with two daughters.

== See also ==
- List of foreign ministers in 2017
- List of current foreign ministers
