= Vance Amory =

Premier of Nevis and cricketer (1949–2022)

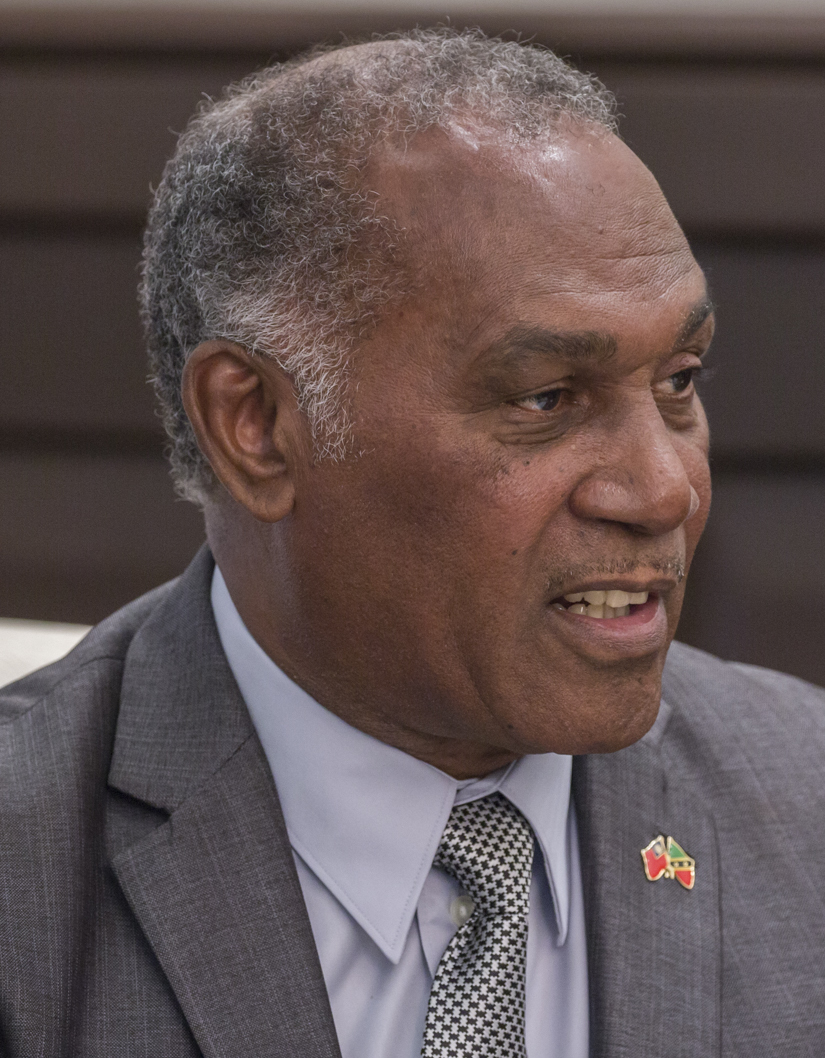
- Amory in 2018

2nd & 4th Premier of Nevis
- In office 23 January 2013 – 19 December 2017
- Preceded by: Joseph Parry
- Succeeded by: Mark Brantley
- In office 2 June 1992 – 11 July 2006
- Preceded by: Simeon Daniel
- Succeeded by: Joseph Parry

Personal details
- Born: Vance Winkworth Amory; 22 May 1949 Rawlins, Gingerland, Nevis, Saint Christopher and Nevis
- Died: 2 April 2022 (aged 72) London, England, United Kingdom
- Party: Concerned Citizens' Movement
- Education: University of the West Indies
- Cricket career

Cricket information
- Batting: Right-handed
- Bowling: Leg break googly

Domestic team information
- Years: Team
- 1968/69–1980/81: Leeward Islands
- 1969/70–1980/81: Combined Leeward and Windward Islands

Career statistics
Competition	First-class	List A
Matches	35	6
Runs scored	1,416	164
Batting average	23.21	27.33
100s/50s	0/7	0/0
Top score	88	45
Balls bowled	44	0
Wickets	1	–
Bowling average	31.00	–
5 wickets in innings	0	–
10 wickets in match	0	–
Best bowling	1/0	–
Catches/stumpings	29/–	0/–
- Source: CricketArchive, 14 October 2011

Vance Winkworth Amory (22 May 1949 – 2 April 2022) was a Saint Kitts and Nevis politician, cricketer, banker, and educator. He served two stints as Premier of Nevis, from 1992 to 2006 and from 2013 to 2017, and served as the Minister of Sports in the Nevis Island Administration. He founded and led the Concerned Citizens' Movement. The airport in Nevis, Vance W. Amory International Airport, bears his name.

== Early life and career ==
Amory was born on 22 May 1949 in Rawlins Village. He received his elementary, primary and secondary school education in Nevis. He had been an active member of a local church in Nevis since childhood.

Amory was known for his fondness for cricket. An opening batsman, he played first-class cricket for the Combined Islands and the Leeward Islands from 1969 to 1981. His highest score was 88, for Leeward Islands against Windward Islands in 1977–78, when he helped to ensure a draw after Leeward Islands trailed by 167 runs on the first innings. In his last match he captained Leeward Islands against the touring English team in March 1981, scoring 37 and 56. He suffered injuries during his career, including a broken nose that caused him to be carried off the field.

Amory excelled academically, obtaining passes in 5 out of available 7 GCE 'O' level subjects at Charlestown Secondary School. He subsequently achieved his 'A' grade levels in St. Kitts, and went on to the University of the West Indies at Cave Hill Campus, Barbados, where he obtained a Bachelor of Arts degree. Then he returned home in 1973 to teach students at Charlestown Secondary School.

He taught at Gingerland Secondary School from 1974 to 1977, including a period of six months as acting headmaster. Then, at the age of 28, he became the youngest headmaster of Charlestown Secondary School. He took an institution that was lagging seriously behind and almost single-handedly restored acceptable grades and credibility. The transition from GCE 'O' levels to CXC and the newly introduced sports programs were among some of the challenges that he overcame, despite opposition. He assisted greatly with the education improvement of thousands during his days as teacher and principal.

Between 1981 and 1983 Amory was manager of the St. Kitts, Nevis and Anguilla National Bank, during which time he aided many individuals in obtaining well needed financing. That bank was relatively new on Nevis and had its early difficulties. Nevis residents were very cautious in doing business with the institution and Amory set his mind to changing this. The bank thereafter experienced healthy financial growth. He was also instrumental in overseeing the purchase of the land on which National Bank sits today.

== Politics ==
In 1983, Amory applied for and successfully received a position in the finance department of the Nevis Island Government. He was then promoted to Permanent Secretary in Finance, under the premiership of Dr. Simeon Daniel. It was from that position that Amory learned the ins and outs of governance. He took study leave in September 1986 to further his education at University of the Virgin Islands, St. Croix campus. He resigned his position in December that year and reported that he wanted to dedicate himself to the betterment of Nevis.

In 1987 he organised a political party, the Concerned Citizens Movement. In 1992, he became Premier of Nevis and served until 2006. His transformation of the face of Nevis can be seen in many facets. He played a substantial role in securing the funding for the construction of the airport. There were numerous regulatory obstacles in the path of the airport's development and numerous delays by the Basseterre Government (in Saint Kitts) in extending a loan guarantee. His commitment to the successful completion of the project is one reason that the airport bears his name. In 1996, he announced plans for Nevis to secede from St. Kitts, but the resulting 1998 referendum failed to reach the necessary two-thirds majority. He was an elected member of the National Assembly of Saint Kitts and Nevis, and served as the leader of the opposition from 2000 to 2004.

Amory served a second term as Premier of Nevis from 2013 to 2017.

== Death ==
Amory died of cancer in a London hospital on 2 April 2022, at the age of 72.

Political offices
Preceded by Simeon Daniel	Premier of Nevis; 1992–2006	Succeeded by Joseph Parry
Preceded by Joseph Parry	Premier of Nevis; 2013–2017	Succeeded by Mark Brantley
