= Concerned Citizens' Movement =

- Leader: Mark Brantley
- Founder: Vance Amory
- Founded: 1987
- Ideology: Nevisian interests Regionalism; Federalism; Fiscal conservatism Economic liberalism
- Political position: Centre-right
- National affiliation: One Movement (since 2022); Team Unity (2013–2022)
- National Assembly (Nevisian Seats): 3 / 3
- Nevis Island Assembly: 3 / 5

Website
- ccmnevis.com

The Concerned Citizens' Movement (CCM) is a Nevis-based political party in Saint Kitts and Nevis. Led by Mark Brantley, it is currently the largest party in Nevis, holding all three Nevisian seats in the National Assembly and three out of five seats in the Nevis Island Assembly. The CCM operates only in Nevis and for the 2022 general election is in a One Movement alliance with the People's Action Movement (PAM) operating in Saint Kitts, following the breakdown of the governing Team Unity alliance.

== History ==
=== National politics ===
The party was established in 1987 and first contested national elections in 1989, when they received 6.4% of the vote and won a single seat. In the 1993 elections their vote share rose to 10.9% and they won two seats. Although their vote share fell to 7.0% in 1995 they retained both seats. The party retained both seats in the elections in 2000, 2004, 2010, and 2015 elections. The party for the first time in its history won all three Nevisian seats in the 2020 election, and again returned three MPs in the 2022 snap election. In 2013, CCM were a founding member of the Team Unity alliance, and upon Team Unity's success in the 2015 and 2020 elections, CCM were a part of the federal government and held various Cabinet minister positions from 2015 until 2022. Team Unity was dissolved in May 2022 after disagreements between Prime Minister Timothy Harris and the CCM and PAM parties. At the 2022 election, SKN Labour won a landslide victory in St Kitts, with CCM becoming the second largest party and therefore the Official Opposition at the national level.

=== Nevis Island politics ===
The party has historically dominated Nevis Island Assembly elections, first winning a majority in the 1992 election and winning the subsequent two elections in 1997 and 2001, with party leader Vance Amory serving as Premier for 14 years during this time in government. In 1996, Amory announced plans for Nevisian secession from the Federation of Saint Kitts and Nevis, with the independence referendum in 1998 returning a majority (62%) in favour of independence, however this fell short of the required two-thirds threshold for it to pass, meaning Nevis remained part of the federation.

The CCM lost the 2006 and 2011 elections to the Nevis Reformation Party (NRP), with Amory serving as Leader of the Opposition during these parliamentary terms. The CCM regained power at the 2013 election, with Amory returning as Premier. On October 30, 2017, Amory handed over party leadership to Mark Brantley. This was an unprecedented move, and the first time in St Kitts-Nevis politics that an elected representative had passed on the leadership of a party without being unseated.

In the December 2017 Nevis Island election, Brantley led the CCM to victory and became Premier, with the party winning four out of five available seats, an increase of one seat. The CCM again won a majority at the 2022 election, although they lost a seat to the NRP.

Among their current executive members is Alexis Jeffers.

== Leadership ==
Vance Amory led the party from 1987 to 2017, and was followed by Mark Brantley.

== Election results ==
=== National Assembly ===
Election year	Party leader	# of votes	% of vote	# of Nevisian seats won	+/–	Govt?
1989	Vance Amory	1,135	6.4 (#4)	1 / 3	▲1	Opposition
1993	Vance Amory	2,100	10.9 (#3)	2 / 3	▲1	Opposition
1995	Vance Amory	1,777	8.2 (#3)	2 / 3	Steady	Official Opposition
2000	Vance Amory	1,901	8.7 (#3)	2 / 3	Steady	Official Opposition
2004	Vance Amory	1,982	8.8 (#3)	2 / 3	Steady	Official Opposition
2010	Vance Amory	2,860	11.0 (#3)	2 / 3	Steady	Opposition
2015	Vance Amory	3,951	13.0 (#3)	2 / 3	Steady	Coalition
2020	Mark Brantley	3,510	12.58 (#4)	3 / 3	▲1	Coalition (2020−22)
2020	Mark Brantley	3,510	12.58 (#4)	3 / 3	▲1	Opposition (2022)
2022	Mark Brantley	3,473	11.82 (#4)	3 / 3	Steady	Opposition

=== Nevis Island Assembly ===
Election year	Party leader	# of votes	% of vote	# of Nevisian seats won	+/–	Govt?
1987	Vance Amory		38%	1 / 5	New	Official Opposition
1992	Vance Amory			3 / 5	▲2	Government
1997	Vance Amory			3 / 5	Steady	Government
2001	Vance Amory			4 / 5	▲1	Government
2006	Vance Amory	3,050	51.3% (#1)	2 / 5	▼2	Official Opposition
2011	Vance Amory	3,722	49.7% (#2)	2 / 5	Steady	Official Opposition
2013	Vance Amory	4,092	53.8% (#1)	3 / 5	▲1	Government
2017	Mark Brantley	3,753	56.7% (#1)	4 / 5	▲1	Government
2022	Mark Brantley	3,930	52.4% (#1)	3 / 5	▼1	Government
