= Premier of Nevis =

The Premier of Nevis heads the Nevis Island Administration, an autonomous governing body within the Federation of Saint Kitts and Nevis.

== List of premiers of Nevis (1983-present) ==
No.	Image	Name	Tenure		Political affiliation
No.	Image	Name	Took office	Left office	Political affiliation
1		Simeon Daniel (1934–2012)	19 September 1983	2 June 1992	Nevis Reformation Party
2		Vance Amory (1949–2022)	2 June 1992	11 July 2006	Concerned Citizens' Movement
3		Joseph Parry	11 July 2006	23 January 2013	Nevis Reformation Party
4		Vance Amory (1949–2022)	23 January 2013	19 December 2017	Concerned Citizens' Movement
5		Mark Brantley (1969–)	19 December 2017	Incumbent	Concerned Citizens' Movement

== See also ==
- List of prime ministers of Saint Kitts and Nevis
- List of leaders of dependent territories
