= Nevis Island Assembly =

Type
- Type: Unicameral

History
- Founded: 1983

Leadership
- President of the Assembly: Michelle Slack-Clarke since 2023
- Premier of Nevis: Mark Brantley, CCM since 2017

Structure
- Seats: 8
- Political groups: Government: Concerned Citizens' Movement (3); Opposition: Nevis Reformation Party (1); Independent (1); Appointed: Appointed (3)

Elections
- Voting system: First-past-the-post
- Last election: 12 December 2022

Meeting place
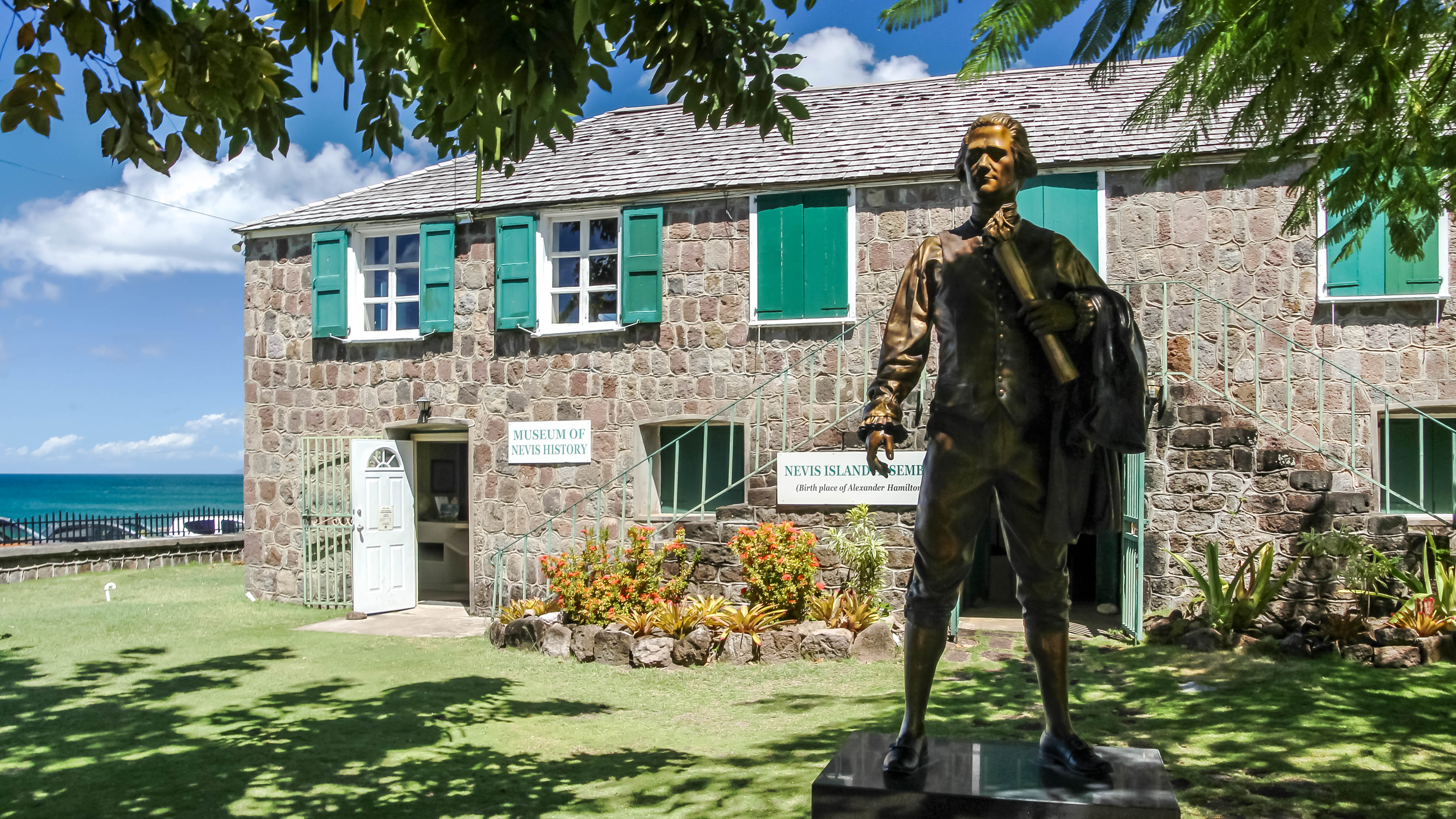
- Nevis Island Assembly and Museum of Nevis History; Charlestown, Nevis

Website
- https://nia.gov.kn/tag/nevis-island-assembly/

The Nevis Island Assembly is the local legislative body for the island of Nevis within the Federation of St Kitts and Nevis. Together with the King, represented by the Deputy Governor-General for Nevis, it forms the Legislature of Nevis.

The Assembly has a total of eight members. Five are directly elected in single-member constituencies using the first-past-the-post system. Three are appointed. Members serve five-year terms.

The Nevis Island Assembly meets in Charlestown on the second floor of Museum of Nevis History building.

Mark Brantley has been Premier of Nevis since the 2017 election after leading the Concerned Citizens' Movement to victory.

== Presidents of the Assembly ==
Name	Took office	Left office	Notes
Spencer Byron	1983	1996	
Marjorie Morton	1996	2011	
Christine Springette	2011	2013	
Farrel Smithen	2013	2023	
Michelle Slack-Clarke	2023	Incumbent	

== Election results ==
Summary of the 12 December 2022 Nevis Island Assembly election results
Parties	Votes	%	Seats
Concerned Citizens' Movement	3,930	52.4%	3
Nevis Reformation Party	3,543	47.2%	2
Moral Restoration Movement	28	0.4%	0
Appointed members			3
Total	7,501		8

In the election the CCM lost a seat (St James') to the NRP.

=== Results by parish constituency ===
St Paul's
Party	Candidate	Votes	%
CCM	Spencer Brand	631	51.1%
NRP	Jaedee Caines	604	48.9%
Total votes		1,235	

St John's
Party	Candidate	Votes	%
CCM	Mark Brantley	1,313	52.6%
NRP	Patricia Bartlette	1,166	46.7%
MRM	Samuel Caines	17	0.7%
Total votes		2,496	

St George's
Party	Candidate	Votes	%
CCM	Eric Evelyn	736	70.3%
NRP	Rohan Isles	311	29.7%
Total votes		1,047	

St James'
Party	Candidate	Votes	%
NRP	Janice Daniel-Hodge	750	49.9%
CCM	Alexis Jeffers	742	49.4%
MRM	Patricia Mills-Jeffers	11	0.7%
Total votes		1,503	

St Thomas'
Party	Candidate	Votes	%
NRP	Cleone Stapleton-Simmonds	712	58.4%
CCM	Latoya Jones	508	41.6%
Total votes		1,220	

== See also ==
- Nevis Island Administration
