= Nevis =

Island in the Caribbean Sea

- Flag Coat of arms

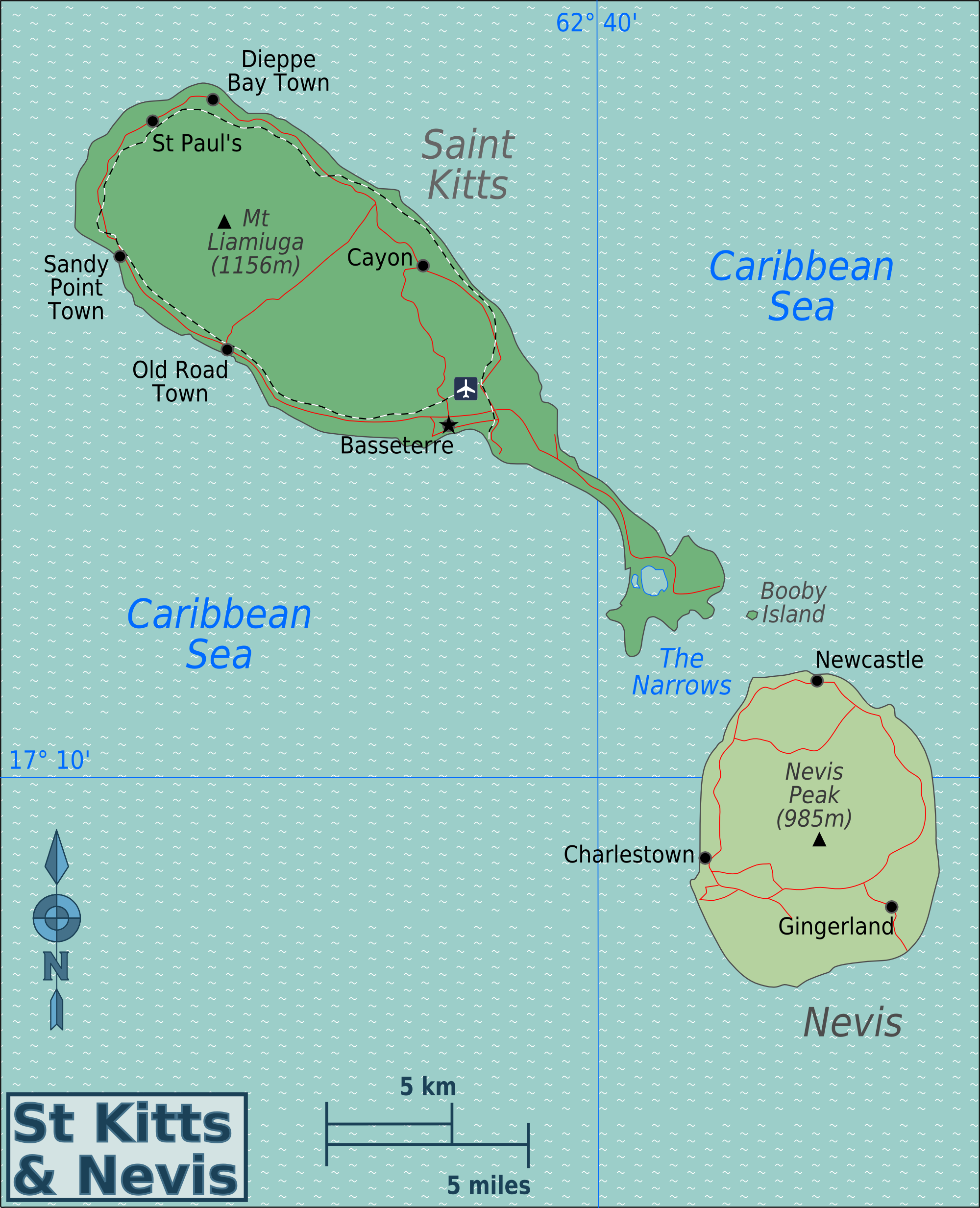
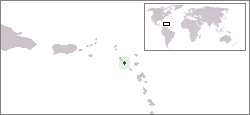
- Location of Nevis in Saint Kitts and Nevis and among the Leeward Islands.
- Capital and largest city: Charlestown; 17°20′N 62°45′W
- Official languages: English
- Demonym: Nevisian
- Government: Parliamentary democracy under a federal constitutional monarchy
  - Monarch: Charles III
  - Deputy Governor-General: Hyleta Liburd
  - Premier: Mark Brantley
  - Assembly President: Michelle Slack-Clarke
- Legislature: Nevis Island Assembly

Area
  - Total: 93 km^{2} (36 sq mi) (207th)

Population
  - 2021 census: 13,182
  - Density: 141/km^{2} (365.2/sq mi) (not ranked)
- GDP (PPP): 2009 estimate
  - Total: $726 million
  - Per capita: $13,429
- GDP (nominal): 2009 estimate
  - Total: $557 million
  - Per capita: $10,315
- HDI (2007): ▼0.825 very high (54th)
- Currency: Eastern Caribbean dollar ($) (XCD)
- Time zone: UTC−4 (−4)
- Date format: dd-mm-yyyy (CE)
- Calling code: +1 869
- Internet TLD: .kn

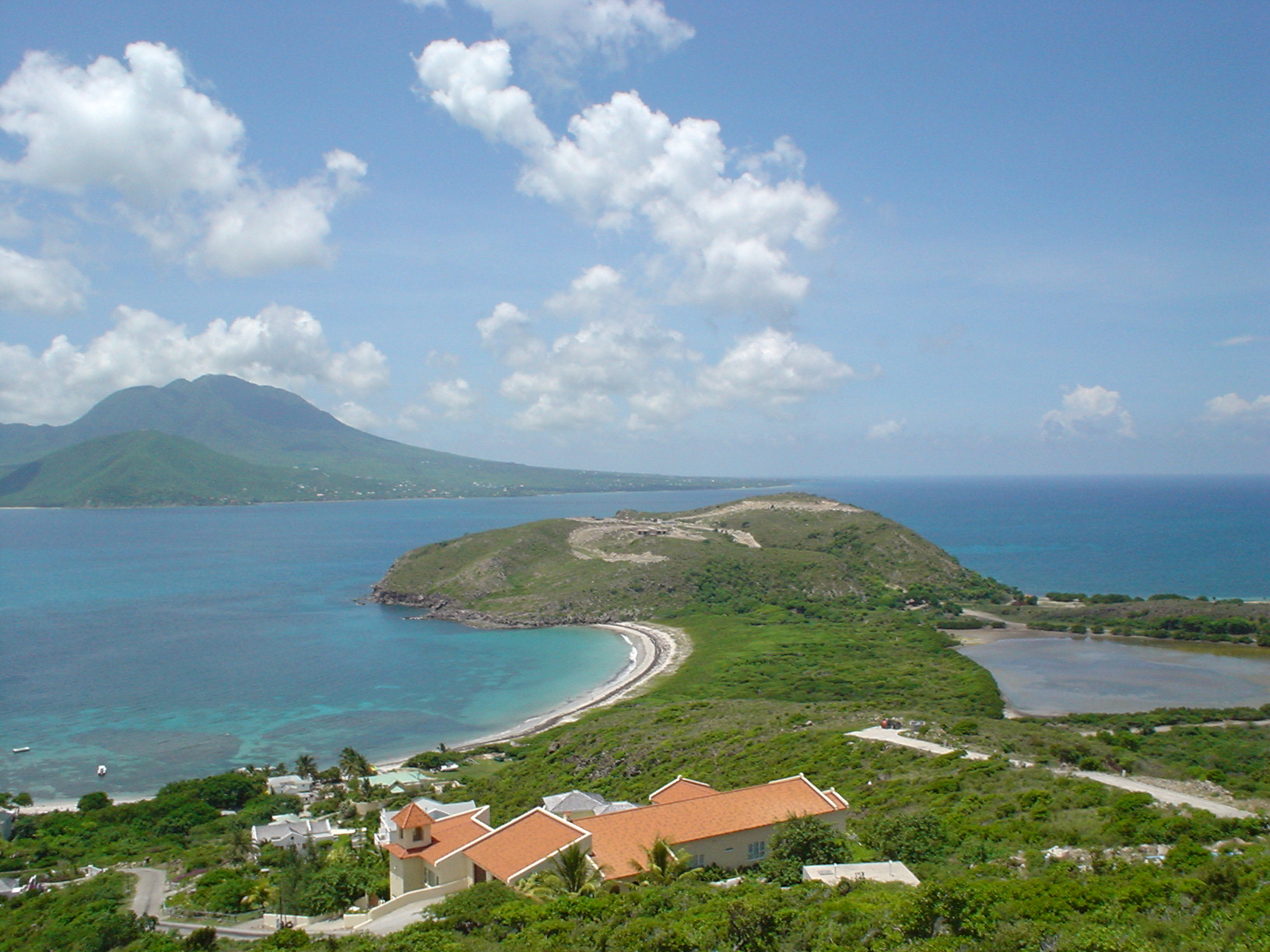
A view of Nevis from the southeastern peninsula of Saint Kitts in 2005

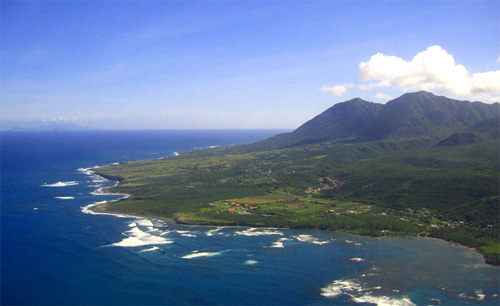
The east coast of Nevis, partially protected by coral reefs with Long Haul Bay visible in the foreground

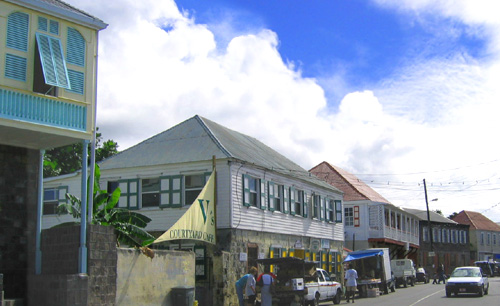
Main Street in Charlestown, Nevis

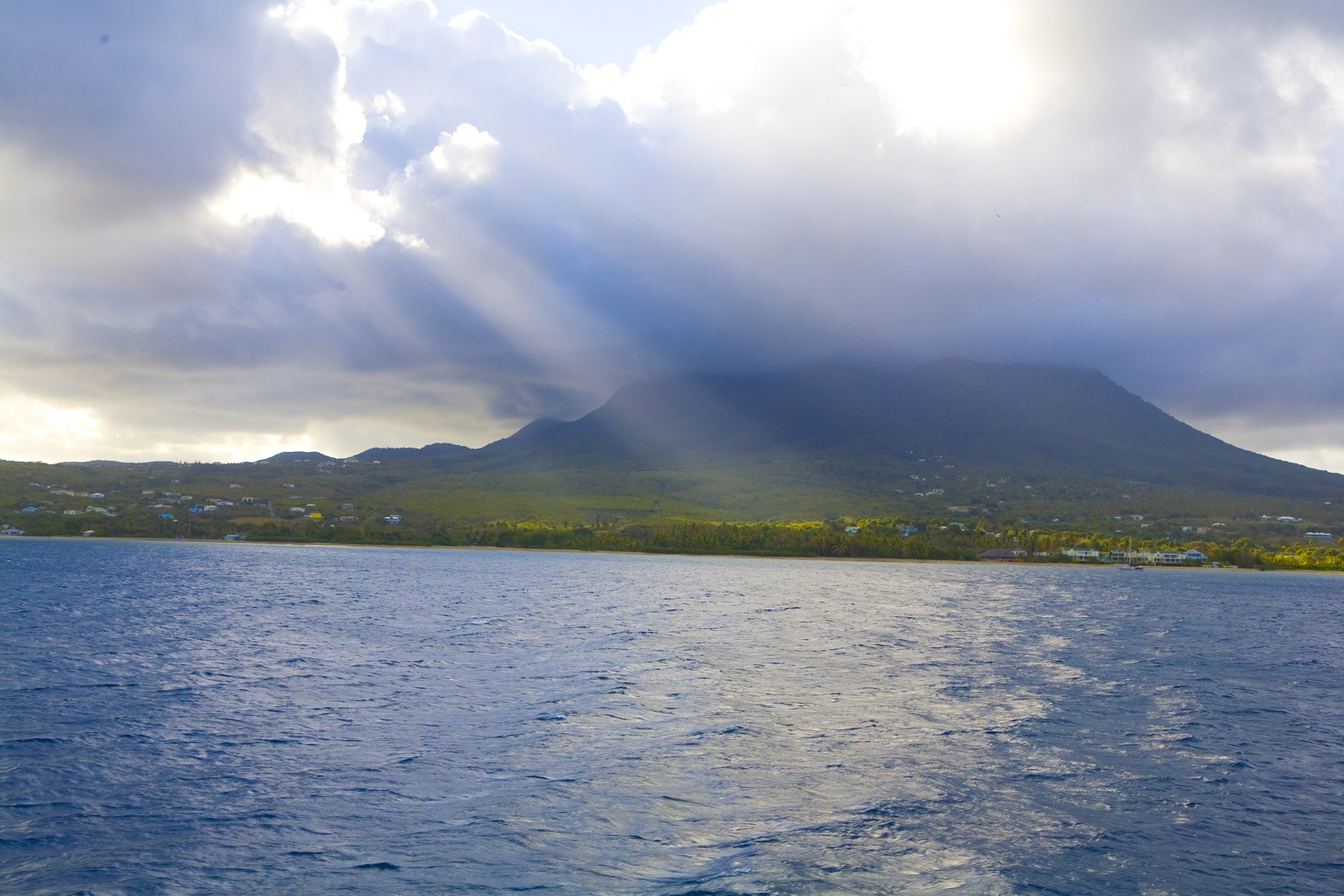
Part of the west coast of Nevis, including the location of Nelson's Spring

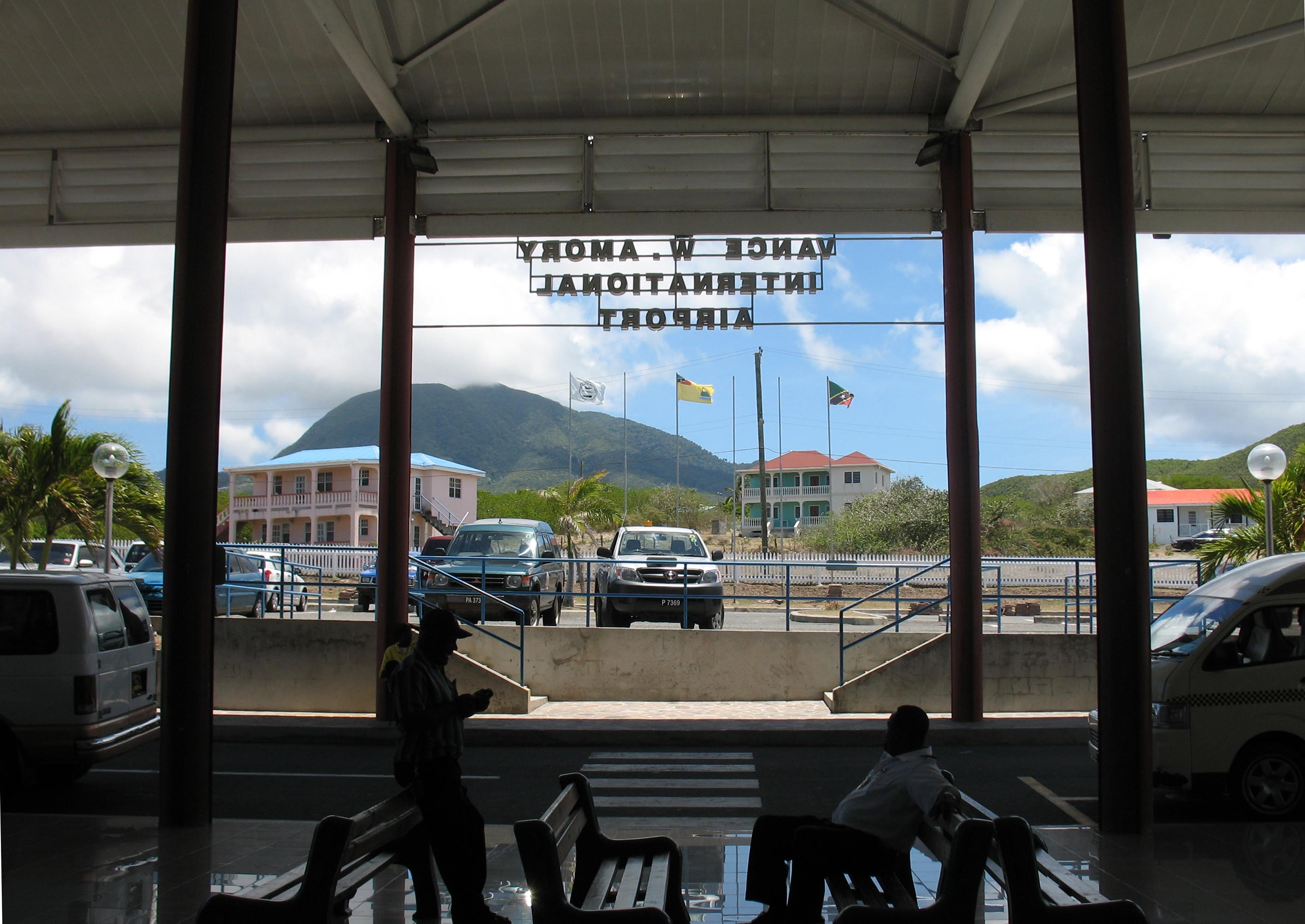
The view looking inland from the Nevis airport in 2008

Nevis (/ˈniːvɪs/ NEE-viss) is an island in the Caribbean Sea that forms part of the inner arc of the Leeward Islands chain of the West Indies. Nevis and the neighbouring island of Saint Kitts constitute the Federation of Saint Kitts and Nevis, a sovereign state. Nevis is located near the northern end of the Lesser Antilles archipelago about 350 kilometres (220 mi) east-southeast of Puerto Rico and 80 kilometres (50 mi) west of Antigua. Its area is 93 square kilometres (36 sq mi) and the capital is Charlestown.

Saint Kitts and Nevis are separated by the Narrows, a shallow 3-kilometre (2 mi) channel. Nevis is roughly conical in shape with a volcano, Nevis Peak, at its centre. The island is fringed on its western and northern coastlines by sandy beaches composed of a mixture of white coral sand with brown and black sand eroded and washed down from the volcanic rocks that make up the island. The gently-sloping coastal plain (1 km (0.62 mi) wide) has natural freshwater springs as well as non-potable volcanic hot springs, especially along the western coast.

The island was named Oualie, translated as "land of beautiful waters", by the Kalinago and Dulcina ("Sweet Island") by the early British settlers. The name Nevis is derived from the Spanish phrase Nuestra Señora de las Nieves, which translates as Our Lady of the Snows; the name was given by the island's Spanish discoverers and first appeared on maps in the 16th century. Nevis is also known by the sobriquet "Queen of the Caribees", which it earned in the 18th century because of its many sugar plantations.

Nevis is both geographically smaller and less populous than Saint Kitts. It maintains significant autonomy within the federation, including a separate government headed by the premier of Nevis and a separate legislature. Nevis has twice voted – in 1977, in an unofficial referendum, and in 1998, in an official one – to secede from the federation, but neither attempt succeeded.

The majority of the approximately 12,000 Nevisians are of primarily African descent, with notable British, Portuguese, and Lebanese minority communities. English is the official language, and its literacy rate of 98 per cent is one of the highest in the Western Hemisphere.

== Etymology ==
In 1493, Christopher Columbus gave the island the name San Martín (Saint Martin). However, the confusion of numerous poorly charted small islands in the Leeward Island chain meant that this name ended up being accidentally transferred to another island, which is still known as Saint-Martin.

The current name Nevis might be derived from the Spanish name Nuestra Señora de las Nieves via process of abbreviation and anglicisation or named after the highest mountain in Scotland, namely Ben Nevis. The Spanish name means Our Lady of the Snows. It is not known who chose this name for the island, but it is a reference to the story of a 4th-century Catholic miracle related to a snowfall on the Esquiline Hill in Rome. Presumably the white clouds that usually cover the top of Nevis Peak reminded someone of this story of a miraculous snowfall in a hot climate.

Nevis was part of the Spanish claim to the Caribbean islands, a claim pursued until the 1670 Treaty of Madrid, even though there were no Spanish settlements on the island. According to Vincent Hubbard, author of Swords, Ships & Sugar: History of Nevis, the Spanish ruling caused many of the Arawak groups who were not ethnically Caribs to "be redefined as Kalinago overnight". Records indicate that the Spanish enslaved large numbers of the native inhabitants on the more accessible of the Leeward Islands and sent them to Cubagua, Venezuela, to dive for pearls. Hubbard suggests that the reason the first European settlers found so few Kalinago on Nevis is that they had already been rounded up by the Spanish and shipped off to be used as slaves.

== History ==
=== Amerindians ===
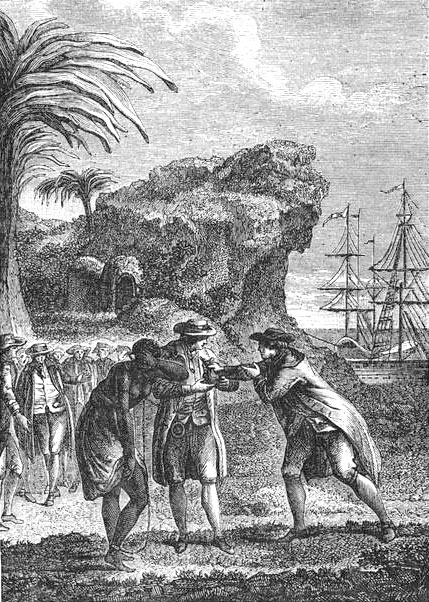
Illustration of French slave trade from the 1876 book The 18th century: Its Institutions, Customs, and Costumes: France, 1700–1789

Nevis had been settled for more than 2,000 years by Amerindian peoples prior to having been sighted by Columbus in 1493. The indigenous people of Nevis during these periods belonged to the Leeward Island Amerindian groups popularly referred to as Arawaks and Kalinago, a complex mosaic of ethnic groups with similar culture and language. Dominican anthropologist Lennox Honychurch traces the European use of the term "Carib" to refer to the Leeward Island aborigines to Columbus, who picked it up from the Taínos on Hispaniola. It was not a name the Kalinago called themselves. "Carib Indians" was the generic name used for all groups believed involved in cannibalistic war rituals, more particularly, the consumption of parts of a killed enemy's body.

The Amerindian name for Nevis was Oualie, land of beautiful waters. The structure of the Kalinago language has been linguistically identified as Arawakan.

=== Colonial era ===
Colony of Nevis
- 1620–1882
- Flag
- Recognised national languages: English, Creole
- Government: Colony of England, later United Kingdom
- King
  - 1620–1625: James I
  - 1837–1882: Queen Victoria
- Governor
Preceded by	Succeeded by
Native Amerindians	Saint Christopher-Nevis-Anguilla

Despite the Spanish claim, Nevis continued to be a popular stop over point for English and Dutch ships on their way to North America. Captain Bartholomew Gilbert of Plymouth visited the island in 1603, spending two weeks to cut 20 tons of lignum vitae wood. Gilbert sailed on to Virginia to seek out survivors of the Roanoke settlement in what is now North Carolina. Captain John Smith visited Nevis on his way to Virginia in 1607 on the voyage that founded Jamestown, the first permanent English settlement in the New World.

On 30 August 1620, James I of England asserted sovereignty over Nevis by giving a Royal Patent for colonisation to the Earl of Carlisle. However, actual English settlement did not happen until 1628, when Anthony Hilton moved from nearby Saint Kitts following a murder plot against him. 80 English settlers accompanied him, soon boosted by a further 100 settlers from London who had initially hoped to settle Barbuda. Hilton became the first Governor of Nevis.

After the Treaty of Madrid between Spain and England, Nevis became a major part of the English West Indies and an admiralty court also sat in Nevis. Between 1675 and 1730, the island was the headquarters for the slave trade to the Leeward Islands, with approximately 6,000–7,000 enslaved West Africans passing through en route to other islands each year. The Royal African Company brought all its ships through Nevis. A 1678 census shows a community of Irish people – 22% of the population – existing as either indentured servants or freemen.

Due to the profitable slave trade and the high quality of Nevisian sugar cane, Nevis soon became a dominant source of wealth for the colonial slavocracy. When the Leeward Islands were separated from Barbados in 1671, Nevis became the seat of the Leeward Islands colony and was given the nickname "Queen of the Caribees". It remained the colonial capital for the Leeward Islands until the seat was transferred to Antigua for military reasons in 1698. During this period, Nevis was the richest of the English Leeward Islands.

Nevis outranked larger islands like Jamaica in sugar production in the late 17th century. The planters' wealth on the island is evident in the tax records preserved at the Calendar State Papers in the Colonial Office's Public Records, where the amount of tax collected on the Leeward Islands was recorded. The sums recorded for 1676 as "head tax on slaves", a tax payable in sugar, amounted to 384,600 pounds in Nevis, as opposed to 67,000 each in Antigua and Saint Kitts, 62,500 in Montserrat, and 5,500 total in the other five islands.

The profits on sugar cultivation in Nevis was enhanced by the fact that the cane juice from Nevis yielded an unusually high amount of sugar. A gallon (3.79 litres) of cane juice from Nevis yielded 24 ounces (0.71 litres) of sugar, whereas a gallon from Saint Kitts yielded 16 ounces (0.47 litres). Twenty per cent of the English colonial empire's total sugar production in 1700 was derived from Nevisian plantations. Exports from West Indian colonies like Nevis were worth more than all the exports from all the mainland Thirteen Colonies of North America combined at the time of the American Revolutionary War.

The enslaved families formed the large labour force required to work the sugar plantations. After the 1650s, the supply of white indentured servants began to dry up due to increased wages in England and less incentive to migrate to the colonies. By the end of the 17th century, the population of Nevis consisted of a small, wealthy planter elite in control, a marginal population of poor Whites, a great majority of African-descended slaves, and an unknown number of maroons, escaped slaves living in the mountains. In 1780, 90 per cent of the 10,000 people living on Nevis were Black. Some of the maroons joined with the few remaining Kalinago in Nevis. Memories of the Nevisian maroons' struggle under the plantation system are preserved in place names such as Maroon Hill, an early centre of resistance.

The great wealth generated by the colonies of the West Indies led to wars among the great powers of Europe. The formation of the United States can be said to be a partial by-product of these wars, and the strategic trade aims that often ignored North America. Three privateers (William Kidd being one of them) were employed by the Crown to help protect ships in Nevis' waters.

During the 17th century, the French, based on Saint Kitts, launched many attacks on Nevis, sometimes assisted by the Kalinago, who in 1667 sent a large fleet of canoes along in support. In the same year, a Franco-Dutch invasion fleet was repelled off Nevis by an English fleet. Letters and other records from the era indicate that colonists on Nevis hated and feared the Kalinago. In 1674 and 1683, they participated in attacks on Kalinago villages in Dominica and St. Vincent, despite a lack of official approval from the Crown for the attack. On Nevis, the English built Fort Charles and a series of smaller fortifications to aid in defending the island. This included Saddle Hill Battery, built in 1740 to replace a deodand on Mount Nevis.

=== Emancipation ===
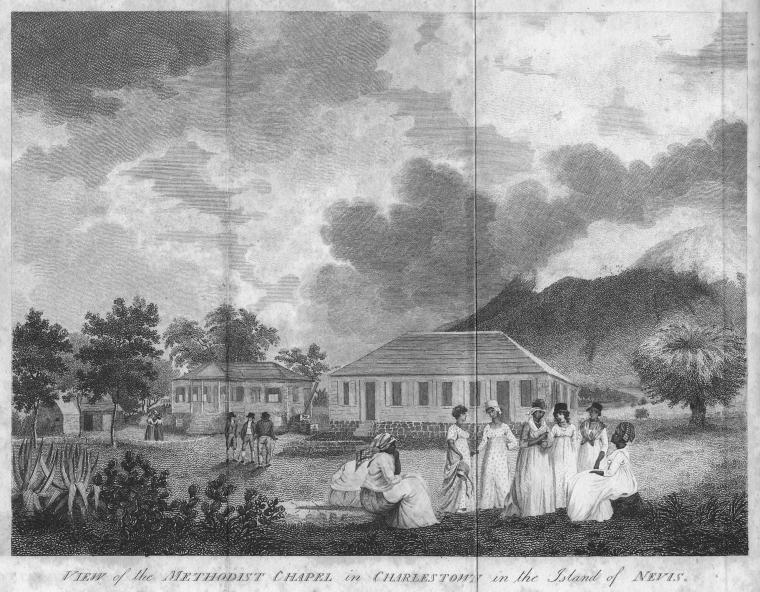
Charlestown Methodist Chapel in 1802. Pro-slavery mobs set the chapel ablaze in 1797, but the building was saved.

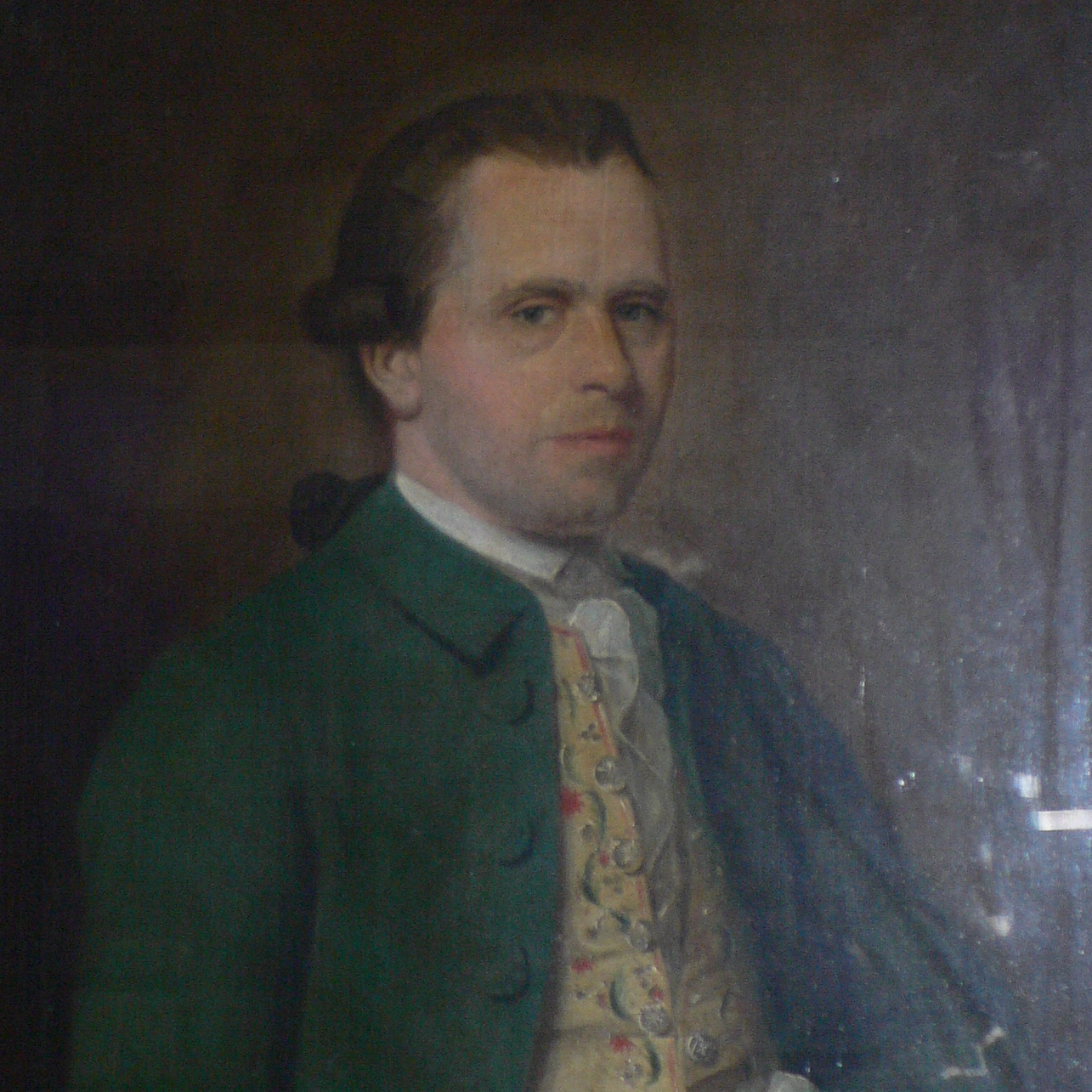
Slave owner and sugar merchant John Pinney of Mountravers Plantation

In 1706, Pierre Le Moyne d'Iberville, the French-Canadian founder of Louisiana in North America, decided to drive the English out of Nevis and thus also stop pirate attacks on French ships; he considered Nevis the region's headquarters for piracy against French trade. During d'Iberville's invasion of Nevis, French buccaneers were used in the front line, infamous for being ruthless killers after the pillaging during the wars with Spain where they gained a reputation for torturing and murdering non-combatants. In the face of the invading force, the English militiamen of Nevis fled.

During the fighting, 3,400 enslaved Nevisians were captured and sent off to Martinique, but about 1,000 more, poorly armed and militarily untrained, held the French troops at bay, by "murderous fire" according to an eyewitness account by an English militiaman. He wrote that "the slaves' brave behaviour and defence there shamed what some of their masters did, and they do not shrink to tell us so." After 18 days of fighting, the French were driven off the island. Among the Nevisian men, women and children carried away on d'Iberville's ships, six ended up in Louisiana, the first persons of African descent to arrive there.

One consequence of the French attack was a collapsed sugar industry and during the ensuing hardship on Nevis, small plots of land on the plantations were made available to the enslaved families in order to control the loss of life due to starvation. With less profitability for the absentee plantation owners, the import of food supplies for the plantation workers dwindled. Between 1776 and 1783, when the food supplies failed to arrive altogether due to the rebellion in North America, 300–400 enslaved Nevisians starved to death. On 1 August 1834, slavery was abolished in the British Empire. In Nevis, 8,815 slaves were freed. The first Monday in August is celebrated as Emancipation Day and is part of the annual Nevis Culturama festival.

A four-year apprenticeship programme followed the abolishment of slavery on the plantations. In spite of the continued use of the labour force, the Nevisian slave owners were paid over £150,000 in compensation from the British Government for the loss of property, whereas the enslaved families received nothing for 200 years of labour. One of the wealthiest planter families in Nevis, the Pinneys of Mountravers Plantation, claimed £36,396 (equivalent to £4,090,087 in 2025) in compensation for the slaves on the family-owned plantations around the Caribbean.

Because of the early distribution of plots and because many of the planters departed from the island when sugar cultivation became unprofitable, a relatively large percentage of Nevisians already owned or controlled land at emancipation. Others settled on crown land. This early development of a society with a majority of small, landowning farmers and entrepreneurs created a stronger middle class in Nevis than in Saint Kitts, where the sugar industry continued until 2006. Even though the 15 families in the wealthy planter elite no longer control the arable land, Saint Kitts still has a large, landless working class population.

=== 1800 to the present day ===
Nevis School in 1899

The population had reached 7,470 by 1842. Nevis was united with Saint Kitts and Anguilla in 1882, and they became an associated state with full internal autonomy in 1967, though Anguilla seceded in 1971. Together, Saint Kitts and Nevis became independent on 19 September 1983. On 10 August 1998, a referendum on Nevis to separate from Saint Kitts had 2,427 votes in favour and 1,498 against, falling short of the two-thirds majority needed.

Before 1967, the local government of Saint Kitts was also the government of Nevis and Anguilla. Nevis had two seats and Anguilla one seat in the government. The economic and infrastructural development of the two smaller islands was not a priority to the colonial federal government.

When the hospital in Charlestown was destroyed in a hurricane in 1899, planting of trees in the squares of Saint Kitts and refurbishing of government buildings, also in Saint Kitts, took precedence over the rebuilding of the only hospital in Nevis. After five years without any proper medical facilities, the leaders in Nevis initiated a campaign, threatening to seek independence from Saint Kitts. The British Administrator in Saint Kitts, Charles Cox, was unmoved. He stated that Nevis did not need a hospital since there had been no significant rise in the number of deaths during the time Nevisians had been without a hospital. Therefore, no action was needed on behalf of the government, and besides, Cox continued, the Legislative Council regarded "Nevis and Anguilla as a drag on St. Kitts and would willingly see a separation".

A letter of complaint to the metropolitan British Foreign Office gave result and the federal government in Saint Kitts was ordered by their superiors in London to take speedy action. The Legislative Council took another five years to consider their options. The final decision by the federal government was to not rebuild the old hospital after all but to instead convert the old Government House in Nevis into a hospital, named Alexandra Hospital after Queen Alexandra, wife of King Edward VII. A majority of the funds assigned for the hospital could thus be spent on the construction of a new official residence in Nevis.

After d'Iberville's invasion in 1704, records show Nevis' sugar industry in ruins and a decimated population begging the English Parliament and relatives for loans and monetary assistance to stave off island-wide starvation. The sugar industry on the island never fully recovered and during the general depression that followed the loss of the West Indian sugar monopoly, Nevis fell on hard times and the island became one of the poorest in the region. The island remained poorer than Saint Kitts until 1991, when the fiscal performance of Nevis edged ahead of the fiscal performance of Saint Kitts for the first time since the French invasion.

Electricity was introduced in Nevis in 1954 when two generators were shipped in to provide electricity to the area around Charlestown. In this regard, Nevis fared better than Anguilla, where there were no paved roads, no electricity and no telephones until 1967. However, electricity did not become available island-wide on Nevis until 1971.

An ambitious infrastructure development programme was introduced in the early 2000s which included a transformation of the Charlestown port, construction of a new deep-water harbour, resurfacing and widening the Island Main Road, a new airport terminal and control tower, and a major airport expansion, which required the relocation of an entire village in order to make room for the runway extension.

Modernised classrooms and better-equipped schools, as well as improvements in the educational system, have contributed to a leap in academic performance on the island. The pass rate among the Nevisian students sitting for the Caribbean Examination Council (CXC) exams, the Cambridge General Certificate of Education Examination (GCE) and the Caribbean Advance Proficiency Examinations is now consistently among the highest in the English-speaking Caribbean.

== Geography ==
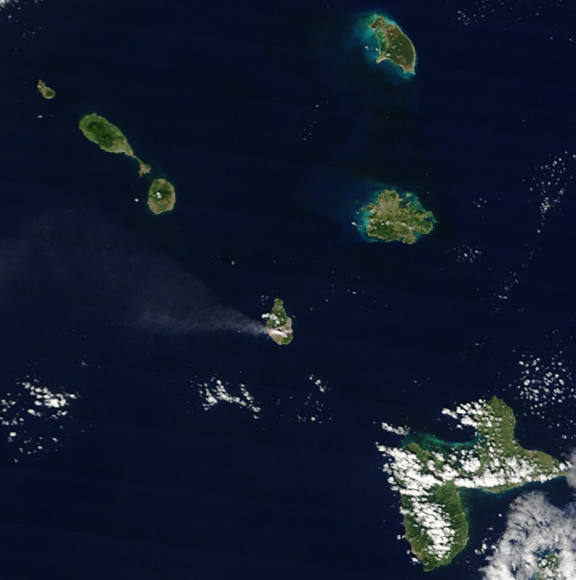
Nevis and neighbouring Leeward Islands during the 2002 volcanic eruption in Montserrat (centre). Top to bottom on left are: St. Eustatius, Saint Kitts, Nevis. On the right are: Barbuda, Antigua, Guadeloupe.

The formation of the island began in mid-Pliocene times, approximately 3.45 million years ago. Nine distinct eruptive centres from different geological ages, ranging from mid-Pliocene to Pleistocene, contributed to the formation. No single model of the island's geological evolution can therefore be ascertained.

Nevis Peak (985 m or 3,232 ft high) is the dormant remnant of one of these ancient stratovolcanoes. The last activity took place about 100,000 years ago, but active fumaroles and hot springs are still found on the island, the most recent formed in 1953. The composite cone of Nevis volcano has two overlapping summit craters that are partially filled by a lava dome, created in recent, pre-Columbian time. Pyroclastic flows and mudflows were deposited on the lower slopes of the cone simultaneously.

Nevis Peak is located on the outer crater rim. Four other lava domes were constructed on the flanks of the volcano, one on the northeast flank (Madden's Mount), one on the eastern flank (Butlers Mountain), one on the northwest coast (Mount Lily) and one on the south coast (Saddle Hill, with a height of 375 metres or 1,230 feet). The southernmost point on the island is Dogwood Point which is also the southernmost point of the Federation of Saint Kitts and Nevis.

During the last ice age, when the sea level was 60 metres (200 ft) lower, the three islands of Saint Kitts, Nevis and Sint Eustatius (also known as Statia) were connected as one island. Saba, however, is separated from these three by a deeper channel.

There are visible wave-breaking reefs along the northern and eastern shorelines. To the south and west, the reefs are located in deeper water. The most developed beach on Nevis is the 4.8 km (3.0 mi) or 6.5 km long (4.0 mi) Pinney's Beach, on the western or Caribbean coast. There is sheltered swimming at Pinney, Nisbet, Lovers, and Oualie beaches. The eastern coast of the island faces into the Atlantic Ocean.

The colour of the sand on the beaches of Nevis is variable: on a lot of the bigger beaches the sand is a yellow-grey in colour, but some beaches on the southern coast have darker, reddish, or even black sand. Under a microscope it becomes clear that Nevis sand is a mixture of tiny fragments of coral, many foraminifera, and small crystals of the various mineral constituents of the volcanic rock of which the island is made.

=== Geology ===
Seven volcanic centers make up Nevis. These include Round Hill (3.43 Ma), Cades Bay (3.22 Ma), Hurricane Hill (2.7 Ma), Saddle Hill (1.8 Ma), Butlers Mountain (1.1 Ma), Red Cliff and Nevis Peak (0.98 Ma). These are mainly andesite and dacite lava domes, with associated block and ash flows, plus lahars. Nevis Peak has the highest elevation, at 984 m. Cades Bay and Farm Estate Soufriere are noted areas of hydrothermal activity.

Water has been piped since 1911 from a spring called the Source, 1,800 feet (550 m) up the mountain, to storage tanks at Rawlins Village, and since 1912 to Butler's Village. Additional drinking water comes from Nelson's Spring near Cotton Ground and Bath Spring. Groundwater has been extracted since the 1990s, and mixed with the Source water.

=== Colonial deforestation ===
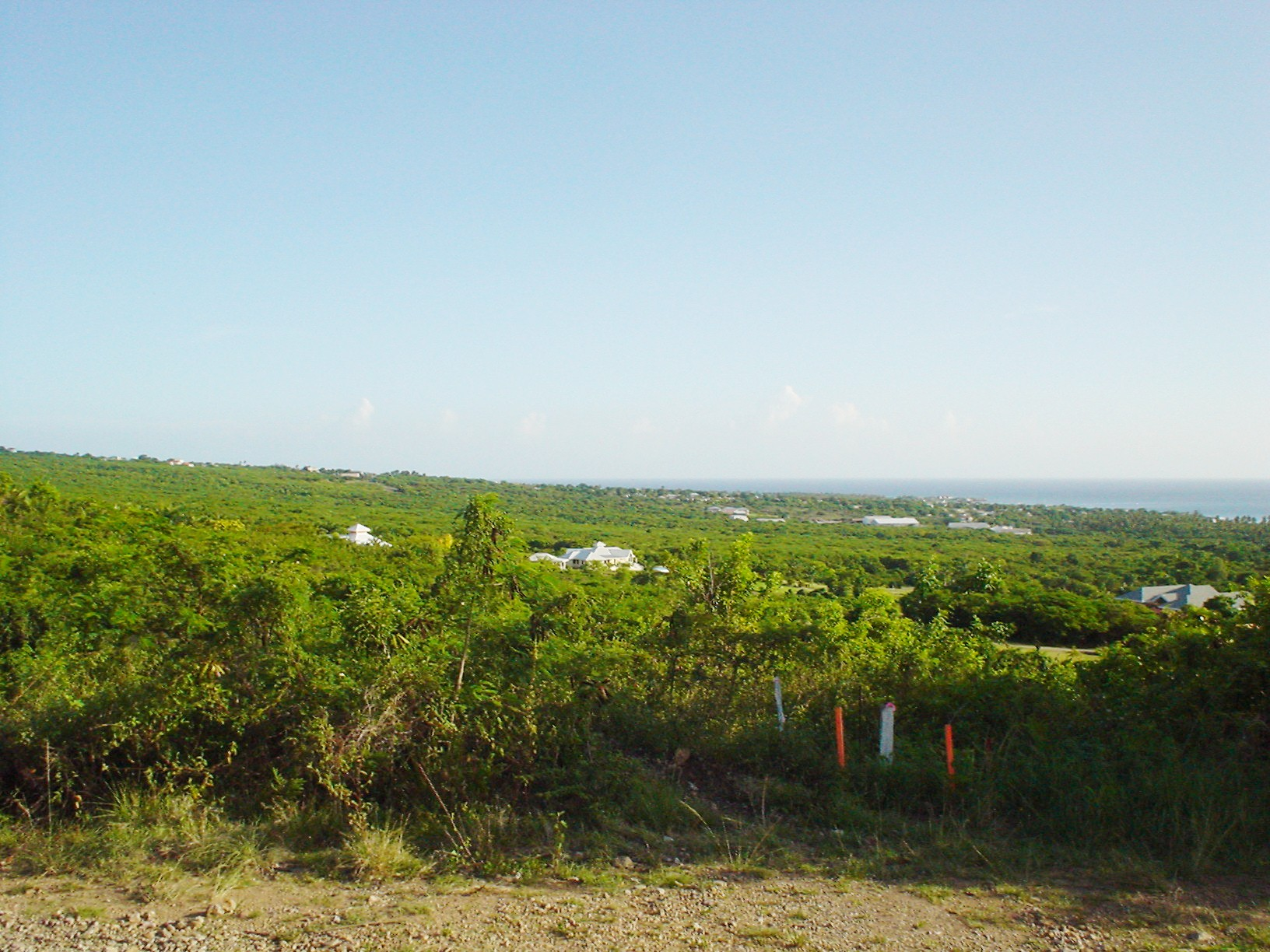
On the western coastal plain, looking south-southwest towards Charlestown

During the 17th and 18th centuries, massive deforestation was undertaken by the planters as the land was initially cleared for sugar cultivation. This intense land exploitation by the sugar and cotton industry lasted almost 300 years, and greatly changed the island's ecosystem.

In some places along the windswept southeast or "Windward" coast of the island, the landscape is radically altered compared with how it used to be in pre-colonial times. Due to extreme land erosion, the topsoil was swept away, and in some places at the coast, sheer cliffs as high as 25 metres (82 feet) have developed.

Thick forest once covered the eastern coastal plain, where the Amerindians built their first settlements during the Aceramic period, complementing the ecosystem surrounding the coral reef just offshore. It was the easy access to fresh water on the island and the rich food source represented by the ocean life sheltered by the reef that made it feasible for the Amerindians to settle this area around 600 BC. With the loss of the natural vegetation, the balance in runoff nutrients to the reef was disturbed, eventually causing as much as 80 per cent of the large eastern fringing reef to become inactive. As the reef broke apart, it, in turn, provided less protection for the coastline.

During times of maximum cultivation, sugar cane fields stretched from the coastline of Nevis up to an altitude at which the mountain slopes were too steep and rocky to farm. Nonetheless, once the sugar industry was finally abandoned, vegetation on the leeward side of the island regrew reasonably well, as scrub and secondary forest.

=== Water resources ===
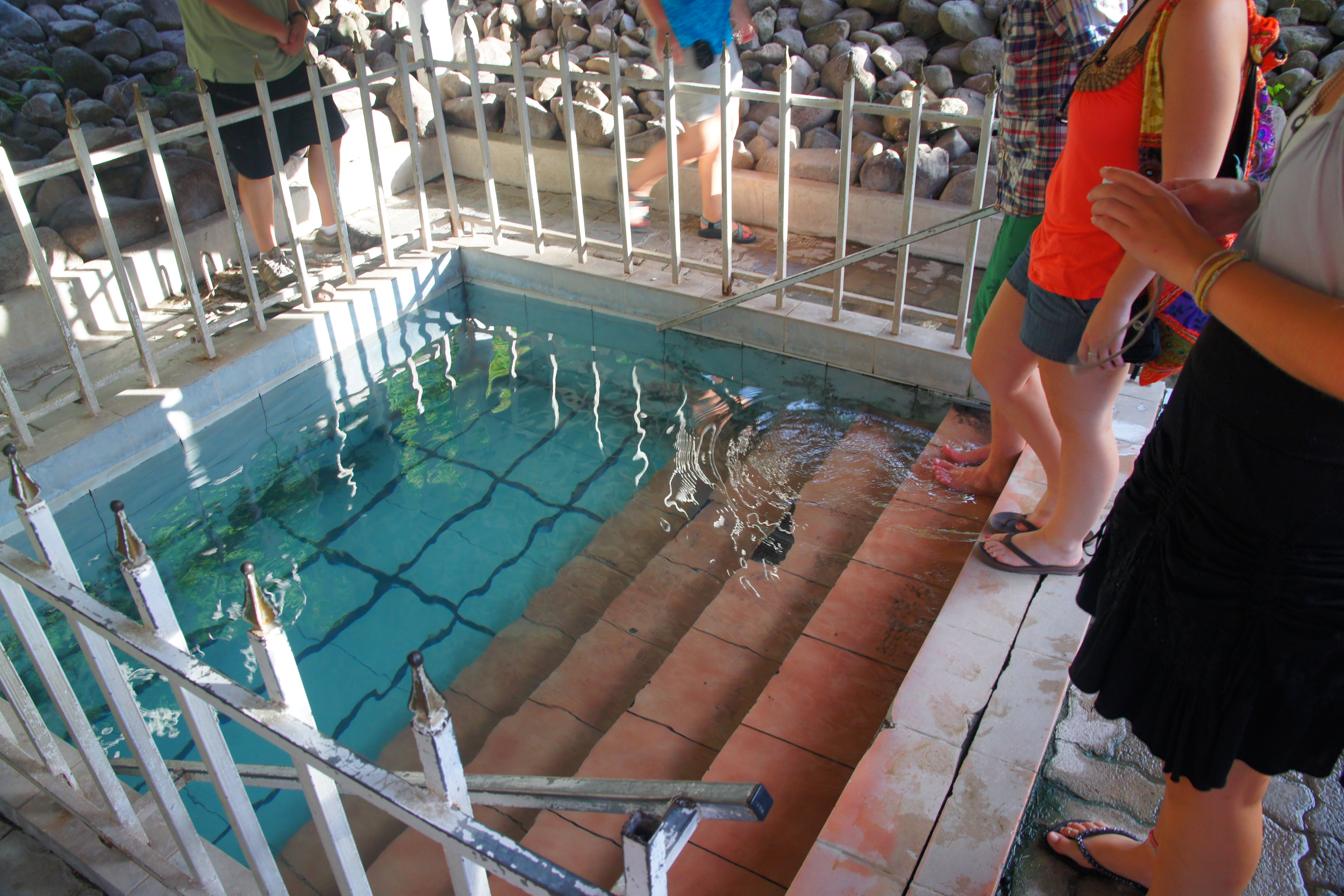
A hot volcanic spring water bathing pool at Bath Spring

Nevis has several natural freshwater springs, including Nelson's Spring. The island also has numerous non-potable volcanic hot springs, including most notably the Bath Spring near Bath village, just south of the capital Charlestown.

After heavy rains, powerful rivers of rainwater pour down the numerous ravines, known as ghauts. When the water reaches the coastline, the corresponding coastal ponds, both freshwater and brackish, fill to capacity and beyond, spilling over into the sea.

With modern development, the existing freshwater springs are no longer enough to supply water to the whole island. The water supply now comes mostly from Government wells. The major source of potable water for the island is groundwater, obtained from 14 active wells. Water is pumped from the wells, stored and allowed to flow by gravity to the various locations.

=== Climate ===
The climate is tropical with little variation, tempered all year round (but particularly from December through February) by the steady north-easterly winds, called the trade winds. There is a slightly hotter and somewhat rainier season from May to November.

Nevis lies within the track area of tropical storms and occasional hurricanes. These storms can develop between June 1 and November 30. This time of year has the heaviest rainfalls.

Nevis also experiences many fires, including the devastating Nevisian Fire of 1876.

==== Hurricanes ====
- September 1989: Hurricane Hugo
- September 1998: Hurricane Georges
- November 1999: Hurricane Lenny caused heavy damage to the island's infrastructure on the western coast, because of the storm's unusual track from west to east
- October 2008: Hurricane Omar forced The Four Seasons Resort Nevis to close to undergo repairs, causing the loss of 600 jobs until the resort reopened in December 2010
- August 2010: Hurricane Earl
- September 2010: Hurricane Igor
- September 2017: Hurricane Irma

== Economy ==
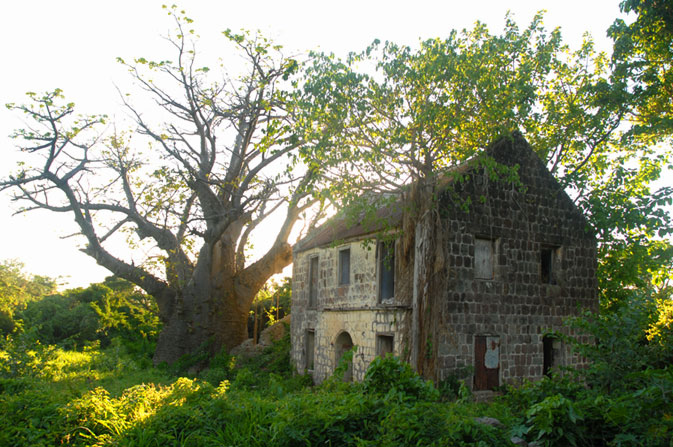
An African baobab tree by a ruin at Mountravers Estate, a former plantation that produced, on average, 110 hogsheads, about 66,000 pounds or 30,000 kilograms of sugar and around 7,250 imperial gallons (33,000 litres) of rum annually

Nevis Heritage Trail sign at Mountravers Estate

The official currency is the Eastern Caribbean dollar (EC$), which is used by the eight member countries of the Eastern Caribbean Central Bank.

The European Commission's Delegation in Barbados and the Eastern Caribbean estimates the annual per capita Gross Domestic Product (GDP) on Nevis to be about 10 per cent higher than on St Kitts.

=== Tourism ===
The major source of revenue for Nevis as of 2023 according to the IMF is tourism. During the 2003–2004 season, approximately 40,000 tourists visited the island. A five-star hotel (The Four Seasons Resort Nevis, West Indies), four exclusive restored plantation inns, and several smaller hotels including Oualie Beach Resort are currently in operation. Larger developments along the west coast have been approved and are being developed (c.2006).

=== Offshore banking ===
The introduction of secrecy legislation has made offshore financial services a rapidly growing economic sector in Nevis. Incorporation of companies, international insurance and reinsurance, as well as several international banks, trust companies, asset management firms, have created a boost in the economy. During 2005, the Nevis Island Treasury collected $94.6 million in annual revenue, compared to $59.8 million during 2001.

In 1998, 17,500 international banking companies were registered in Nevis. Registration and annual filing fees paid in 1999 by these entities amounted to over 10 per cent of Nevis' revenues. The offshore financial industry gained importance during the financial disaster of 1999 when Hurricane Lenny damaged the major resort on the island, causing the hotel to be closed down for a year and 400 of the 700 employees to be laid off.

In 2000, the Financial Action Task Force, part of the Organisation for Economic Co-operation and Development (OECD), issued a blacklist of 35 countries which were said to be non-cooperative in the campaign against tax evasion and money laundering. At the time, the list included the Federation of Saint Kitts and Nevis, although the country was subsequently removed following various reforms.

== Politics ==
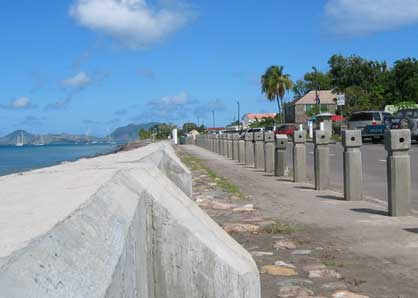
The new seawall at Charlestown, Nevis, in 2005. Saint Kitts is seen in the background across the channel known as the Narrows; the museum of Nevis history is visible in the mid distance.

The political structure for the Federation of Saint Kitts and Nevis is based on the Westminster Parliamentary system, but it is a unique structure in that Nevis has its own unicameral legislature, consisting of the monarch's representative, the Deputy Governor General, and members of the Nevis Island Assembly. Nevis has considerable autonomy in its legislative branch. The constitution actually empowers the Nevis Island Legislature to make laws that cannot be abrogated by the National Assembly.

Nevis has a constitutionally protected right to secede from the federation should a two-thirds majority of the island's population vote for independence in a local referendum. Section 113.(1) of the constitution states: "The Nevis Island Legislature may provide that the island of Nevis shall cease to be federated with the island of Saint Christopher and accordingly that this Constitution shall no longer have effect in the island of Nevis."

Nevis has its own premier and its own government, the Nevis Island Administration. It collects its own taxes and has a separate budget, with a current account surplus. According to a statement released by the Nevis Ministry of Finance in 2005, Nevis had one of the highest growth rates in gross national product and per capita income in the Caribbean at that point.

=== Elections ===
Nevis elections are scheduled every five years. The Nevis elections of 2013, called on 23 January 2013, were won by the party in opposition, the Concerned Citizens Movement (CCM), led by Vance Amory. The CCM won three of the five seats in the Nevis Island Assembly, while the incumbent party, the Nevis Reformation Party (NRP), won two.

In the federal elections of 2010, the CCM won two of the three Nevis assigned Federal seats, while the NRP won one. Of the eight Saint Kitts assigned federal seats, the St Kitts-Nevis Labour Party won six and the People's Action Movement (PAM) two.

=== Movement for constitutional reform ===
Joseph Parry, leader of the opposition, has indicated that he favours constitutional reform over secession for Nevis. His party, the NRP, has historically been the strongest and most ardent proponent for Nevis independence; the party came to power with secession as the main campaign issue. In 1975, the NRP manifesto declared that: "The Nevis Reformation Party will strive at all costs to gain secession for Nevis from St. Kitts – a privilege enjoyed by the island of Nevis prior to 1882."

A cursory proposal for constitutional reform was presented by the NRP in 1999, but the issue was not prominent in the 2006 election campaign and it appears a detailed proposal has yet to be worked out and agreed upon within the party.

In Handbook of Federal Countries published by Forum of Federations, the authors consider the constitution problematic because it does not "specifically outline" the federal financial arrangements or the means by which the central government and Nevis Island Administration can raise revenue: "In terms of the NIA, the constitution only states (in s. 108(1)) that 'all revenues...raised or received by the Administration...shall be paid into and form a fund styled the Nevis Island Consolidated Fund.' [...] Section 110(1) states that the proceeds of all 'takes' collected in St. Kitts and Nevis under any law are to be shared between the federal government and the Nevis Island Administration based on population. The share going to the NIA, however, is subject to deductions (s. 110(2)), such as the cost of common services and debt charges, as determined by the Governor-General (s.110(3)) on the advice of the Prime Minister who can also take advice from the Premier of Nevis (s.110(4))."

According to a 1995 report by the Commonwealth Observer Group of the Commonwealth Secretariat, "the federal government is also the local government of St Kitts and this has resulted in a perception among the political parties in Nevis that the interests of the people of Nevis are being neglected by the federal government which is more concerned with the administration of St Kitts than with the federal administration."

=== Secession movement ===
Simeon Daniel, Nevis' first Premier and former leader of the Nevis Reformation Party (NRP) and Vance Amory, Premier and leader of the Concerned Citizens' Movement (CCM), made sovereign independence for Nevis from the Federation of Saint Kitts and Nevis part of the agenda of their parties. Since the island group gained independence from the United Kingdom in 1983, the Nevis Island Administration and the Federal Government have been involved in several conflicts over the interpretation of the new constitution which came into effect when the federation was formed. During an interview on Voice of America in March 1998, repeated in a government-issued press release headlined "PM Douglas Maintains 1983 Constitution is Flawed", Prime Minister Denzil Douglas called the constitution a "recipe for disaster and disharmony among the people of both islands".

A crisis developed in 1984 when the People's Action Movement (PAM) won a majority in the Federal elections and temporarily ceased honouring the Federal Government's financial obligations to Nevis. Consequently, cheques issued by the Nevis Administration were not honoured by the Bank, public servants in Nevis were not paid on time and the Nevis Island Administration experienced difficulties in meeting its financial obligations.

There is also substantial support in Nevis for British Overseas Territory status similar to Anguilla's, which was formerly the third of the tri-state Saint Christopher-Nevis-Anguilla colony.

==== Legislative motivation for secession ====
In 1996, four new bills were introduced in the National Assembly in Saint Kitts, one of which made provisions to have revenue derived from activities in Nevis paid directly to the treasury in Saint Kitts instead of to the treasury in Nevis. Another bill, The Financial Services Committee Act, contained provisions that all investments in Saint Kitts and Nevis would require approval by an investment committee in Saint Kitts. This was controversial, because ever since 1983 the Nevis Island Administration had approved all investments for Nevis, on the basis that the constitution vests legislative authority for industries, trades and businesses and economic development in Nevis to the Nevis Island Administration.

All three representatives from Nevis, including the leader of the opposition in the Nevis Island Assembly, objected to the introduction of these bills into the National Assembly in Saint Kitts, arguing that the bills would affect the ability of Nevis to develop its offshore financial services sector and that the bills would be detrimental to the Nevis economy. All the representatives in opposition in the National Assembly shared the conviction that the bills if passed into law, would be unconstitutional and undermine the constitutional and legislative authority of the Nevis Island Administration, as well as result in the destruction of the economy of Nevis.

The constitutional crisis initially developed when the newly appointed Attorney General refused to grant permission for the Nevis Island Administration to assert its legal right in the Courts. After a decision of the High Court in favour of the Nevis Island Administration, the Prime Minister gave newspaper interviews stating that he "refused to accept the decision of the High Court". Due to the deteriorating relationship between the Nevis Island Administration and the Federal Government, a Constitutional Committee was appointed in April 1996 to advise on whether or not the present constitutional arrangement between the islands should continue. The committee recommended constitutional reform and the establishment of an island administration for Saint Kitts, separate from the Federal Government.

The Federal Government in Saint Kitts fills both functions today and Saint Kitts does not have an equivalent to the Nevis Island Administration. Disagreements between the political parties in Nevis and between the Nevis Island Administration and the Federal Government have prevented the recommendations by the electoral committee from being implemented. The problematic political arrangement between the two islands, therefore, continues to date.

Nevis has continued developing its own legislation, such as The Nevis International Insurance Ordinance and the Nevis International Mutual Funds Ordinance of 2004, but calls for secession are often based on concerns that the legislative authority of the Nevis Island Administration might be challenged again in the future.

==== Fiscal motivation for secession ====
The issues of political dissension between Saint Kitts and Nevis are often centred around perceptions of imbalance in the economic structure. As noted by many scholars, Nevisians have often referred to a structural imbalance in Saint Kitts' favour in how funds are distributed between the two islands and this issue has made the movement for Nevis secession a constant presence in the island's political arena, with many articles appearing in the local press expressing concerns such as those compiled by Everton Powell in "What Motivates Our Call for Independence":

- Many of the businesses that operate in Nevis are headquartered in Saint Kitts and pay the corporate taxes to Saint Kitts, despite the fact that profits for those businesses are derived from Nevis.
- The vast majority of Nevisians and residents of Nevis depart the Federation from Saint Kitts. This meant that departure taxes are paid in Saint Kitts.
- The bulk of cargo destined for Nevis enters the Federation through Saint Kitts. Custom duties are therefore paid in Saint Kitts.
- The largest expenditure for Nevis, approximately 29 per cent of the Nevis Island Administration's recurrent budget, is education and health services, but the Nevis Island Legislature has no power to legislate over these two areas.
- Police, defense and coast guard are a federal responsibility. Charlestown Police Station, which served as the Headquarters for police officers in Nevis, was destroyed by fire in December 1991. Police officers initially had to operate out of the ruin, until the Nevis Island Administration managed to raise the resources to re-house the police.
- Nevis experiences an economic disadvantage because of preferential treatment by the federal government for development of Saint Kitts. The division of foreign aid and various forms of international assistance toward development and infrastructure are especially contentious issues. Lists showing the disparities in sharing have been compiled by Dr. Everson Hull, a former Economics professor of Howard University, and are available online.

==== 1998 referendum ====
A referendum on secession from the Federation of St. Kitts and Nevis was held in 1998. Although 62% voted in favor of a secession, a two-thirds majority would have been necessary for the referendum to succeed.

== Administrative divisions ==
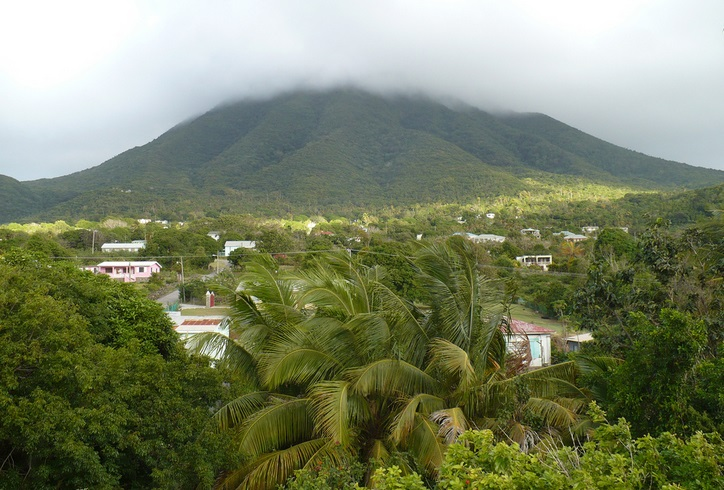
Saint George Gingerland Parish

The island of Nevis is divided into five administrative subdivisions called parishes, each of which has an elected representative in the Nevis Island Assembly. The division of this almost round island into parishes was done in a circular sector pattern, so each parish is shaped like a pie slice, reaching from the highest point of Nevis Peak down to the coastline.

Some of the parishes have double names. For example, the first part of the name of Saint George Gingerland is the name of the patron saint of the parish church, and the second part of the name is the traditional common name of the parish. Often the parishes are referred to simply by their common names. The religious part of a parish name is sometimes written or pronounced in the possessive, as follows: Saint George's Gingerland.

The five parishes of Nevis are:

- Saint George Gingerland
- Saint James Windward
- Saint John Figtree
- Saint Paul Charlestown
- Saint Thomas Lowland

== Culture ==
Culturama, the annual cultural festival of Nevis, is celebrated during the Emancipation Day weekend, the first week of August. The festivities include many traditional folk dances, such as the masquerade, the Moko jumbies on stilts, Cowboys and Indians, and Plait the Ribbon, a May pole dance. The celebration was given a more organised form in 1974, including a Miss Culture Show and a Calypso Competition, as well as drama performances, old fashion Troupes (including Johnny Walkers, Giant and Spear, Bulls, Red Cross and Blue Ribbon), arts and crafts exhibitions and recipe competitions. According to the Nevis Department of Culture, the aim is to protect and encourage indigenous folklore, in order to make sure that the uniquely Caribbean culture can "reassert itself and flourish".

=== Language ===
The official language is English. Saint Kitts Creole is also spoken on Nevis and less so on the neighbouring island.

=== Music, theatre and dance ===
Nevisian culture has since the 17th century incorporated African, European, and East Indian cultural elements, creating a distinct Afro-Caribbean culture. Several historical anthropologists have done field research Nevis and in Nevisian migrant communities in order to trace the creation and constitution of a Nevisian cultural community. Karen Fog Olwig published her research about Nevis in 1993, writing that the areas where the Afro-Caribbean traditions were especially strong and flourishing relate to kinship and subsistence farming. However, she adds, Afro-Caribbean cultural impulses were not recognised or valued in the colonial society and were therefore often expressed through Euro-Caribbean cultural forms.

Examples of European forms appropriated to express Afro-Caribbean culture are the Nevisian and Kittitian Tea Meetings and Christmas Sports. According to anthropologist Roger D. Abrahams, these traditional performance art forms are "Nevisian approximation of British performance codes, techniques, and patterns". He writes that the Tea Meetings were staged as theatrical "battles between decorum and chaos", decorum represented by the ceremony chairmen and chaos by the hecklers in the audience, with a diplomatic King or a Queen presiding over the battle to ensure fairness.

The Christmas Sports included a form of comedy and satire based on local events and gossip. They were historically an important part of the Christmas celebrations in Nevis, performed on Christmas Eve by small troupes consisting of five or six men accompanied by string bands from different parts of the island. One of the men in the troupe was dressed as a woman, playing all the female parts in the dramatisations. The troupes moved from yard to yard to perform their skits, using props, face paint and costumes to play the roles of well-known personalities in the community.

Examples of gossip about undesired behaviour that could surface in the skits for comic effect were querulous neighbours, adulterous affairs, planters mistreating workers, domestic disputes or abuse, crooked politicians and any form of stealing or cheating experienced in the society. Even though no names were mentioned in these skits, the audience would usually be able to guess who the heckling message in the troupe's dramatised portrayals was aimed at, as it was played out right on the person's own front yard. The acts thus functioned as social and moral commentaries on current events and behaviours in Nevisian society. This particular form is called "Bazzarding" by many locals. Abrahams theorises that Christmas Sports are rooted in the pre-emancipation Christmas and New Year holiday celebrations, when the enslaved population had several days off.

American folklorist and musicologist Alan Lomax visited Nevis in 1962 in order to conduct long-term research into the black folk culture of the island. His field trip to Nevis and surrounding islands resulted in the anthology Lomax Caribbean Voyage series. Among the Nevisians recorded were chantey-singing fishermen in a session organised in a rum shop in Newcastle; Santoy, the Calypsonian, performing calypsos by Nevisian ballader and local legend Charles Walters to guitar and cuatro; and string bands, fife players and drummers from Gingerland, performing quadrilles.

The island is also known for "Jamband music", which is the kind of music performed by local bands during the "Culturama Festival" and is key to "Jouvert" dancing. The sounds of the so-called "Iron Band" are also popular within the culture; many locals come together using any old pans, sinks, or other kits of any sort; which they use to create sounds and music. This form of music is played throughout the villages during the Christmas and carnival seasons.

=== Architecture ===
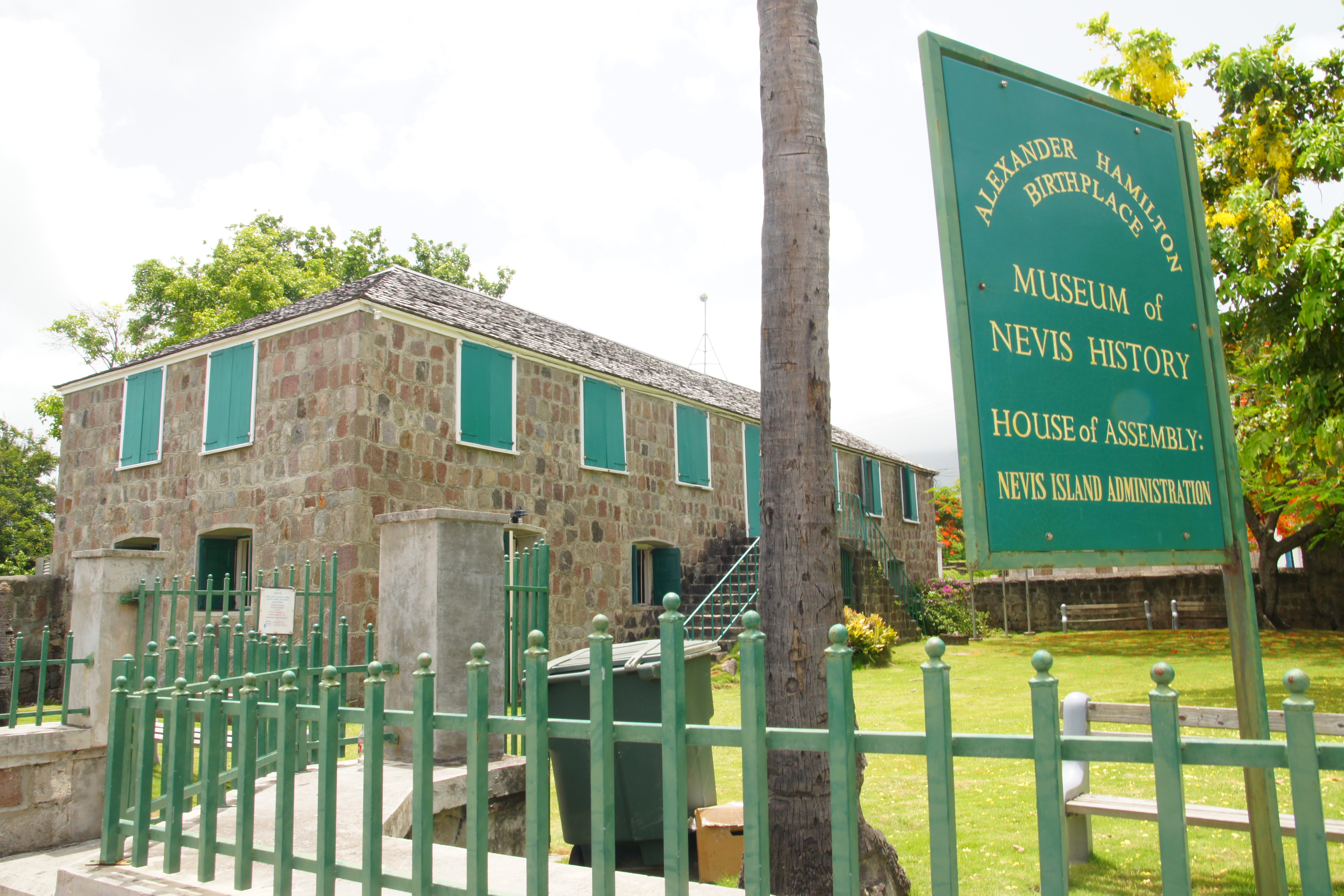
The Museum of Nevis History in Charlestown is housed in the restored Georgian stone building which is near the mostly wooden building where Alexander Hamilton was born.

A series of earthquakes during the 18th century severely damaged most of the colonial-era stone buildings of Charlestown. The Georgian stone buildings in Charlestown that are visible today had to be partially rebuilt after the earthquakes, and this led to the development of a new architectural style, consisting of a wooden upper floor over a stone ground floor; the new style resisted earthquake damage much more effectively.

Two important Nevisian buildings from the 18th century are Hermitage Plantation, built of lignum vitae wood in 1740, the oldest surviving wooden house still in use in the Caribbean today, and the Bath Hotel, the first hotel in the Caribbean, a luxury hotel and spa built by John Huggins in 1778. The soothing waters of the hotel's hot spring and the lively social life on Nevis attracted Europeans including Antigua-based Admiral Nelson, and Prince William Henry, Duke of Clarence, (future King William IV), who attended balls and private parties at the Bath Hotel. Today, the building serves as government offices, and there are two outdoor hot-spring bathing spots which were specially constructed in recent years for public use.

According to local folklore, a destructive 1680 or 1690 earthquake and tsunami destroyed the buildings of the original capital Jamestown on the west coast. Folk tales say that the town sank beneath the ocean, and the tsunami is blamed for the escape of (possibly fictional) pirate Red Legs Greaves. However, archaeologists from the University of Southampton who have done excavations in the area have found no evidence for such a tsunami. They state that this story may originate with an over-excited Victorian letter writer sharing somewhat exaggerated accounts of his exotic life in the tropical colony with a British audience back home.

One such letter recounts that so much damage was done to the town that it was completely evacuated, and was engulfed by the sea. Early maps do not, however, actually show a settlement called "Jamestown", only "Morton's Bay", and later maps show that all that was left of Jamestown/Morton's Bay in 1818 was a building labelled "Pleasure House". Very old bricks that wash up on Pinney's Beach after storms may have contributed to this legend of a sunken town; however, these bricks are thought to be dumped ballast from 17th and 18th century sailing ships.

== Notable people ==
- Arthur Anslyn, marine expert
- Keith Arthurton, cricket player
- Bertram L. Baker, Majority Whip of the New York State Assembly (1966–1970)
- John Cleese, actor/comedian, founding member of the British comedy group Monty Python
- Frances "Fanny" Coker (1767 – 1820) freed slave in Bristol
- Rupert Crosse, first African American to be nominated for an Academy Award as Best Supporting Actor
- Alexander Hamilton, statesman and one of the Founding Fathers of the United States
- Runako Morton, cricket player
- Frances Nelson, wife of Admiral Lord Horatio Nelson
- Eulalie Spence, pioneer playwright of the Harlem Renaissance
- Kimbell Ward, FIFA football referee
- Elquemedo Willett, cricket player, inducted into the Nevis Sports Museum Hall of Fame in 2005
- Kieran Powell, cricket player

== See also ==
- Chief Justice of the Leeward Islands
- Nevis Historical and Conservation Society
