= List of political parties in Saint Kitts and Nevis =

This article lists political parties in Saint Kitts and Nevis. Saint Kitts and Nevis has a modified two-party system, which means that there are two dominant political coalitions, with extreme difficulty for anybody to achieve electoral success under the banner of any other party.

Before the 2015 election the conservative People's Action Movement, the Nevis-based Concerned Citizens Movement and the 2013 formed People's Labour Party founded the Team Unity alliance. After that the social democratic Saint Kitts and Nevis Labour Party and the Nevis Reformation Party formed an accommodation to contest the polls.

== The parties ==
=== Saint Kitts ===
| Name | Founded | Ideology | Leader | National Assembly |
|---|---|---|---|---|
| Saint Kitts and Nevis Labour Party | 1932 | Social democracy | Terrance Drew | 6 / 11 |
| People's Action Movement | 1965 | Conservatism; Republicanism | Natasha Grey-Brookes | 1 / 11 |
| People's Labour Party | 2013 | - | Timothy Harris | 1 / 11 |

=== Nevis ===
| Name | Founded | Ideology | Leader | National Assembly | Nevis Island Assembly |
|---|---|---|---|---|---|
| Concerned Citizens' Movement | 1987 | Conservatism | Mark Brantley | 3 / 11 | 3 / 5 |
| Nevis Reformation Party | 1970 | Nevisian interests; Regionalism; Federalism; Autonomism | Janice Daniel-Hodge | 0 / 11 | 1 / 5 |

== See also ==
- Politics of Saint Kitts and Nevis
- List of political parties by country
