= Politics of Saint Kitts and Nevis =

Saint Kitts and Nevis is a federal parliamentary democracy. It is an independent Commonwealth realm with Charles III as its king, viceregally represented by a governor-general. He acts on the advice of the prime minister, who is the majority party leader in the National Assembly, and who, with a cabinet, conducts affairs of state.

== General aspects ==
St Kitts and Nevis has a single National Assembly responsible for making laws, and comprising 14 or 15 members depending upon circumstances. 11 of these are directly elected representatives whilst three are senators appointed by the governor-general (two on the advice of the prime minister and the third on the advice of the leader of the opposition). If the attorney general isn't appointed as a senator then he automatically gets a seat as one, increasing the number of senators to four. Of the 11 elected members, eight represent constituencies in St Kitts and the remaining three represent Nevis seats.

The prime minister in this system is appointed by the governor-general from among the representatives, with the constitutional duty of selecting someone likely to command the support of the majority of representatives. Typically, this means the leader of the majority party or coalition. If no suitable candidate is identified, the governor-general has the authority to dissolve the assembly, triggering a general election. Other ministers are also appointed by the governor-general, based on the advice of the prime minister. The prime minister can be removed from office either by the assembly or by the governor-general if the prime minister loses the support of the majority of representatives. The assembly is elected every five years unless the governor-general dissolves it earlier, which can be done on the advice of the prime minister.

St Kitts and Nevis has enjoyed a long history of free and fair elections, although the outcome of elections in 1993 was strongly protested by the opposition and the Regional Security System (RSS) was briefly deployed to restore order. The elections in 1995 were contested by the two major parties, the ruling People's Action Movement (PAM) and the St Kitts and Nevis Labour Party. Labour won seven of the 11 seats, with Dr Denzil Douglas becoming prime minister. In the March 2000 elections, Denzil Douglas and the Labour Party were returned to power, winning eight of the 11 seats in the House. The Nevis-based Concerned Citizens Movement (CCM) won two seats and the Nevis Reformation Party (NRP) won one seat. The PAM party was unable to obtain a seat.

The 2015 Saint Kitts and Nevis general election was won by Timothy Harris and his recently formed People's Labour Party, with backing from the PAM and the Nevis-based Concerned Citizens' Movement under the 'Team Unity' banner. In June 2020, Team Unity coalition of the incumbent government, led by Prime Minister Timothy Harris, won general elections by defeating St Kitts and Nevis Labour Party (SKNLP). In the general election on 5 August 2022, Terrance Drew was elected as the fourth and current prime minister of Saint Kitts and Nevis after his St. Kitts-Nevis Labour Party (SKNLP) won snap general election.

Under the constitution, Nevis has considerable autonomy and has an island assembly, a premier, and a deputy governor-general. Under certain specified conditions, it may secede from the federation. In accordance with its rights under the Constitution, in 1996 the Nevis Island Administration under the Concerned Citizens' Movement (CCM) of Premier Vance Amory initiated steps towards secession from the Federation, the most recent being a referendum in 1998 that failed to secure the required two-thirds majority for secession. The March 2000 election results placed Vance Armory, as head of the CCM, the leader of the country's opposition party. In the September 7, 2001 elections in Nevis for the Nevis Island Administration, the CCM won four of the five seats available, while the NRP won one. In 2003, the Nevis Island Administration again proposed secession and initiated formal constitutional procedures to hold a referendum on the issue, which was held in early 2004. While opposing secession, the Government acknowledged the constitutional rights of Nevisians to determine their future independence. Constitutional safeguards include freedom of speech, press, worship, movement, and association. The most recent elections in Nevis took place on July 10, 2006. Amory's CCM was defeated by the NRP of Joseph Parry, winning only two out of the five elective seats. Parry was sworn in as the third Premier of Nevis a day later.

Its judicial system is modelled on British practice and procedure and its jurisprudence on English common law. The Royal St Kitts and Nevis Police Force has about 370 members.

== Executive branch ==
As head of state, King Charles III is vice-regally represented by a Governor-General who acts on the advice of the prime minister. Following legislative elections, the leader of the majority party or leader of a majority coalition is usually appointed prime minister by the governor-general. All other ministerial appointments, including that of deputy prime minister, are made by the governor-general, but acting upon the advice of the prime minister.

Main office-holders

The King of Saint Kitts and Nevis:
Charles III
since
8 September 2022

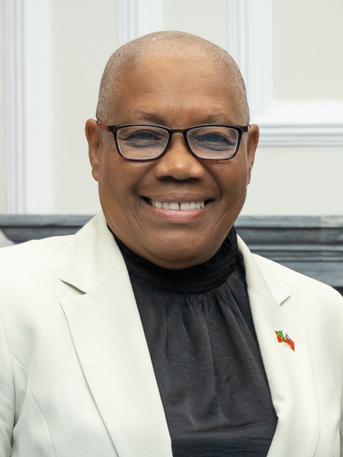
The Governor-General of Saint Kitts and Nevis:
Dame Marcella Liburd
since
1 February 2023

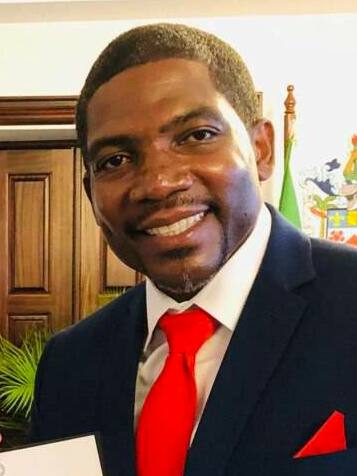
The Prime Minister of Saint Kitts and Nevis:
Terrance Drew
since
6 August 2022

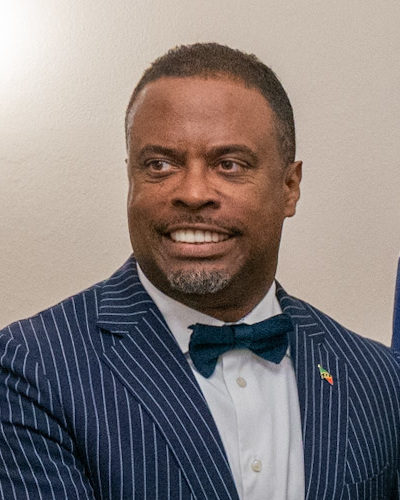
The Premier of Nevis:
Mark Brantley
since
18 December 2017

== Judicial branch ==
Eastern Caribbean Supreme Court (based on Saint Lucia); one judge of the Supreme Court resides in Saint Kitts.

The Judicial Committee of the Privy Council in London is the highest appellate court.

== Administrative divisions ==
The country is divided in 14 parishes: Christ Church Nichola Town, Saint Anne Sandy Point, Saint George Basseterre, Saint George Gingerland, Saint James Windward, Saint John Capisterre, Saint John Figtree, Saint Mary Cayon, Saint Paul Capisterre, Saint Paul Charlestown, Saint Peter Basseterre, Saint Thomas Lowland, Saint Thomas Middle Island, Trinity Palmetto Point.

Nine of the parishes are on the island of Saint Kitts and five are on the island of Nevis.

== International organisation participation ==
ACP, Caricom, CDB, Commonwealth of Nations ECLAC, FAO, G-77, IBRD, ICFTU, ICRM, IDA, IFAD, IFC, IFRCS, ILO, IMF, Interpol, IOC, NAM OAS, OECS, OPANAL, OPCW, UN, UNCTAD, UNESCO, UNIDO, UPU, WCL, WHO, WIPO, WTrO
