= Jonel Powell =

Former Education Minister of Saint Kitts and Nevis

Minister of Education, Youth, Sports and Culture
- In office June 2020 – May 2022
- Prime Minister: Timothy Harris

Member of Parliament
- In office June 2020 – May 2022
- Prime Minister: Timothy Harris
- Preceded by: Marcella Liburd
- Succeeded by: Marsha Henderson
- Constituency: Saint Christopher #2

Personal details
- Party: People's Action Movement
- Other political affiliations: Team Unity (2013-2022)
- Education: University of the West Indies; Norman Manley Law School
- Occupation: Lawyer, politician

Jonel Powell is a Kittitian attorney and former People's Action Movement politician who was a Member of Parliament and cabinet minister from 2020 until 2022.

== Early life and legal career ==
Powell grew up and completed his education in Saint Kitts. He then worked at the Royal Bank of Canada in Saint Kitts for two years, before going on to study law in Barbados at the University of the West Indies (Cave Hill) from 2003 to 2006, and then from 2006 to 2008 he attended the Norman Manley Law School to pursue a Legal Education Certificate. He then practiced offshore, commercial and corporate litigation law in Anguilla. In 2011, he returned to Saint Kitts and Nevis to become the managing partner of a law firm, Grant, Powell & Co, which he co-founded with Lindsay Grant.

== Political career ==
In the 2015 general election, Powell unsuccessfully stood as the People's Action Movement (PAM) candidate for the Saint Christopher #2 constituency. Following the election result, in which PAM and its allies in Team Unity successfully won a majority, Powell was announced in May 2015 as the designated Ambassador and Special Envoy to the ministries of Sports and Culture by Prime Minister Timothy Harris.

In the 2020 general election, Powell again ran as the PAM candidate for the Saint Christopher #2 constituency. He was successfully elected to serve as its Member of Parliament, gaining the seat from Labour with 1,654 votes to Labour MP Marcella Liburd's 1,422 votes. Following the election, Powell was appointed to serve in the cabinet as Minister of Education, Youth, Sports and Culture. In May 2022, Powell was one of six ministers removed from office following disagreements by the PAM and CCM party leaders with Prime Minister Harris. Harris also dissolved parliament and called a snap election.

In the August 2022 snap election, Powell lost his seat to Labour candidate Marsha Henderson. In May 2025, he announced he would not contest a future general election.

== Post-political career ==
In 2024, Powell was listed as a legal practitioner with an active practicing certificate in Saint Kitts and Nevis, and is currently a managing partner at Grant, Powell & Co.
