= Ian Liburd =

Saint Kitts and Nevis politician and ambassador (born 1952)

Permanent Representative of Saint Kitts and Nevis to the United Nations in New York
- In office 18 January 2021 – 2022
- Prime Minister: Timothy Harris; Terrance Drew
- Succeeded by: Nerys Dockery

Minister for Public Infrastructure, Urban Development, Transport and Post
- In office 2015–2020
- Prime Minister: Timothy Harris

Personal details
- Born: 1952 (age 73–74) Saint Kitts and Nevis
- Party: People's Action Movement
- Education: University of Bradford (MBA); University of Plymouth (PgD)

Ian "Patches" McDonald Liburd (born 1952) is a former politician, ambassador, and civil servant from Saint Kitts and Nevis.

== Early life and career ==
Liburd was born in 1952. He has an MBA from the University of Bradford Management School, a Post Graduate Diploma in Management Studies from the University of Plymouth, holds a membership of the Chartered Institute of Logistics and Transport, and is a Fellow of the Chartered Management Institute (FCMI).

== Political career ==
In the 2015 general election, Liburd was elected to the National Assembly as a People's Action Movement (PAM) Member of Parliament for the Saint Christopher #1 constituency. Following the election in which PAM and its allies in the Team Unity alliance successfully won a majority, Liburd was appointed to the Cabinet as Minister for Public Infrastructure, Post Urban Development, and Transport. He was not re-elected at the 2020 general election. In 2021, Liburd was appointed as the Permanent Representative of Saint Kitts and Nevis to the United Nations in New York, succeeding Sam Condor. He was succeeded by Nerys Dockery as UN permanent representative in October 2022.
