= Michael Oliver Powell =

Michael Powell

Deputy Prime Minister of Saint Kitts and Nevis
- In office 1983 – April 1992
- Prime Minister: Kennedy Simmonds
- Preceded by: Office Established (himself as Deputy Premier)
- Succeeded by: Sydney Morris

Deputy Premier of Saint Kitts and Nevis
- In office 1980–1983
- Prime Minister: Kennedy Simmonds
- Preceded by: Charles Egbert Mills
- Succeeded by: Office Abolished (himself as Deputy Prime Minister)

Personal details
- Born: Michael Oliver Powell; April 10, 1939 (age 87)
- Party: People's Action Movement; United People's Party
- Other political affiliations: Team Unity

Michael Oliver Powell is a Kittitian politician who served as deputy premier and then deputy prime minister of Saint Kitts and Nevis from 1980 until 1992. He returned to government in the Team Unity administration which lasted from 2015 until 2022, serving as Special Envoy to the Office of the Prime Minister.

== Early life and career ==
Powell was born on 10 April 1939. He had a private business from 1966 to 1980.

== Political career ==
In 1965 Powell was one of the founding members of People's Action Movement (PAM). He became secretary-general of the opposition-controlled Working People's Union. In 1976, Powell was elected vice-president of the People's Action Movement in 1976 when Kennedy Simmonds was elected party leader.

In the 1980 elections, when PAM came to power, Powell was elected to the National Assembly. Simmonds appointed him as deputy prime minister. He also held the additional portfolio of minister of agriculture. He later received the additional portfolio of minister of tourism. Powell was sacked from the cabinet by Kennedy Simmonds on 1 April 1992. Following his dismissal from the PAM government, he founded and led the United People's Party.

In 2013, he voiced support again for the People's Action Movement. Following the success of the Team Unity alliance in winning the 2015 election and forming government, Powell was appointed by Prime Minister Timothy Harris to serve in the administration as Special Envoy to the Office of the Prime Minister.
