= Eugene Hamilton (Kittitian politician) =

Deputy Prime Minister of Saint Kitts and Nevis
- In office May 2022 – August 2022
- Prime Minister: Timothy Harris
- Preceded by: Shawn Richards
- Succeeded by: Geoffrey Hanley

Personal details
- Born: 7 September 1953 (age 73)
- Party: People's Action Movement

Eugene Hamilton (born 7 September 1953) is a retired Kittitian politician who formerly served as a cabinet minister in Saint Kitts and Nevis from 2015 until 2022, and was shortly the Deputy Prime Minister from May until August 2022.

== Early life and career ==
Hamilton was born and educated in Cayon. He pursued further studies and attained various qualifications from the Life Insurance Marketing and Research Association and Life Management Institute in the United States, as well as from the Administrative Staff College of India and the National Training Institute in Malaysia. Prior to entering politics, he had worked in a range of jobs in banking and insurance, including as Deputy Chairman of the Board of Directors of the Development Bank of St. Kitts and Nevis, and Secretary to the Board of the National Caribbean Insurance Co. Ltd.

== Political career ==
In the 2010 general election, Hamilton stood as a candidate for the People's Action Movement (PAM) and was elected to the National Assembly in the St Christopher #8 constituency. He was re-elected at the 2015 and 2020 elections. He is a former deputy leader of PAM and was a cabinet minister in the Team Unity government from 2015-2022, serving as Minister of Agriculture, Health and National Health Insurance, Human Settlements, Community Development, Gender Affairs, Social Services, Lands and Cooperatives from February 2015 to June 2020 and as Minister of Human Settlement, National Health; Insurance, Social Security, Ecclesiastical Affairs, Social Development and Gender Affairs from June 2020 to August 2022

From May 2022 until the snap 2022 general election in August, he also served as the Deputy Prime Minister of Saint Kitts and Nevis and took on additional ministerial responsibilities for Public Infrastructure, Posts and Urban Development. He did not run for re-election in the snap election and retired from politics.
