= 2021 Saint Kitts and Nevis Labour Party leadership election =

Election to replace Denzil Douglas

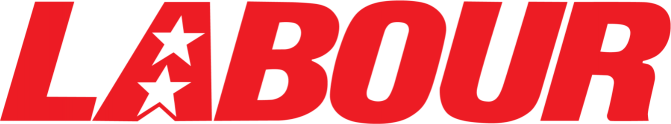
- 28 November 2021
| Candidate | Terrance Drew | Konris Maynard | Geoffrey Hanley |
| Popular vote | 184 | 153 | 70 |
| Percentage | 45.2% | 37.6% | 17.2% |
Leader before election
Denzil Douglas
Leader after election
Terrance Drew

The 2021 Saint Kitts and Nevis Labour Party leadership election was held following former Prime Minister Denzil Douglas stepping down as leader of the Saint Kitts and Nevis Labour Party (SKNLP). In the vote at Labour's party conference on 28 November 2021, Terrance Drew was elected as party leader.

== Background ==
In October 2021, Denzil Douglas announced his intention to step down as leader of the Saint Kitts and Nevis Labour Party by not seeking re-election to the position at the next party conference, and that a new leader would instead be elected. Douglas had served as leader for 32 years since 1989, and as Prime Minister of the federation from 1995 to 2015. His resignation came over a year after Labour had lost the 2020 general election, with Labour sitting in opposition and Douglas continuing to serve as Leader of the Opposition.

== Candidates ==
- Terrance Drew – Chairman of the Saint Kitts and Nevis Labour Party
- Geoffrey Hanley – Member of Parliament for Constituency #1
- Konris Maynard – Former Member of Parliament for Constituency #3

== Voting ==
Those eligible to vote included 50 delegates from each of the eight Saint Kitts constituencies, and delegates from the National Executive, Young Labour, Labour Women, and the Saint Kitts and Nevis Trades and Labour Union. A total of 412 delegates participated in the contest held at the party conference in November 2021.

== Result ==
| Candidate | Votes | % |
|---|---|---|
| Terrance Drew | 184 | 45.2% |
| Konris Maynard | 153 | 37.6% |
| Geoffrey Hanley | 70 | 17.2% |

A total of 412 delegates voted, with 5 of the votes being spoilt.

== Aftermath ==
In his final address to party delegates as outgoing leader following the leadership election, Denzil Douglas encouraged party delegates to give their support to incoming leader Terrance Drew. As Drew was not an MP, Douglas remained as Leader of the Opposition in the National Assembly.
