= List of ambassadors of the Republic of China to Saint Kitts and Nevis =

Coordinates: 17.302180°N 62.724185°W

Republic of China (Taiwan) Ambassador to Saint Kitts and Nevis
- 中華民國駐聖克里斯多福及尼維斯大使
- Incumbent; George Gow Wei Chiou since 25 March 2015
- Inaugural holder: Katharine Chang
- Formation: 1997; 29 years ago

Ambassador to Saint Kitts and Nevis, Tao Ling-wen, 2025

The Republic of China (Taiwan) ambassador to Saint Kitts and Nevis is the official representative of the Republic of China to the Federation of Saint Christopher and Nevis.

== List of representatives ==
Diplomatic agrément/Diplomatic accreditation	Ambassador	Chinese language	Observations	List of premiers of the Republic of China	List of prime ministers of Saint Kitts and Nevis	Term end
1983			The governments in Basseterre and Taipei established diplomatic relations.	Sun Yun-suan	Kennedy Simmonds	
1997	Katharine Chang	張小月	Republic of China's first female ambassador to St Kitts and Nevis and the Commonwealth of Dominica.	Vincent Siew	Denzil Douglas	
2002	Liu Chen-kun	劉振崑		Yu Shyi-kun	Denzil Douglas	
February 1, 2008	Wu Rong-thuan			Liu Chao-shiuan	Denzil Douglas	
March 25, 2015	George Gow Wei Chiou	邱高偉		Mao Chi-kuo	Timothy Harris	
