= William Florian Glasford =

Politician from Saint Kitts and Nevis

William Florian Glasford OBE CSM

Speaker of the House of Assembly of Saint Christopher-Nevis-Anguilla
- In office 1971–1978
- Succeeded by: Ada Mae Edwards

Personal details
- Born: 12 December 1908
- Died: 3 August 1978 (aged 69)
- Party: SKNLP

William Florian Glasford (12 December 1908 – 3 August 1978) was a politician and trade unionist from Saint Kitts.

== Biography ==
Glasford was born on 12 December 1908 and attended the Government Elementary School. He later worked in the sugar industry.

From 1945 to 1947, he was vice president of the Saint Kitts and Nevis Trades and Labour Union. In the 1957 Saint Kitts-Nevis-Anguilla general election, Glasford successfully stood for election as the Labour candidate for the East Basseterre constituency. He was re-elected in the 1961 and 1966 elections. He also served as the Minister of Agriculture and Labour.

In the 1971 Saint Kitts-Nevis-Anguilla general election, Glasford was succeeded as the Labour representative for East Basseterre by Paul Southwell. That year, he was appointed Speaker of the House of Assembly. In the 1977 Silver Jubilee and Birthday Honours, Glasford was awarded an OBE for "public services in St. Kitts-Nevis-Anguilla."

On 3 August 1978, Glasford died while in office, and was succeeded as speaker by Ada Mae Edwards.

In 2008, Glasford was posthumously awarded the Star of Merit.
