= Constance V. Mitcham =

Politician in Saint Kitts and Nevis

Dame Constance Viola Mitcham, DBE (born 1947) is a politician in Saint Kitts and Nevis. She was the first woman elected to the National Assembly for that country. She was also the first woman to serve as acting prime minister for the country.

She was born in Sandy Point Town and completed her education to high school in St. Kitts. She continued her education in England, earning a LLB from Kingston University in 1971. The following year, Mitcham completed her legal studies at the Middle Temple and was called to the bar of England and Wales. In 1972, on her return to the Caribbean, she was called to the bars of Saint Kitts and Nevis, Anguilla, the British Virgin Islands and Antigua. Mitcham also became registrar for the high court, chief magistrate and supervisor of elections for the British Virgin Islands, president of the bar association for Saint Kitts and Nevis and senior magistrate for Saint Kitts.

She was elected to the national assembly for Saint Kitts and Nevis in 1984 as a member of the People's Action Movement and served as minister of health, women's affairs and labour until 1995, when she left politics.

Mitcham is founder and head for the legal firm of Mitcham and Benjamin. She also serves as Ambassador Extraordinary and Plenipotentiary and special advisor to Timothy Harris, the Prime Minister of Saint Kitts and Nevis.
