= 2022 Saint Kitts and Nevis general election =

- 5 August 2022

11 of the 15 seats in the National Assembly 6 seats needed for a majority
- Registered: 50,973
- Turnout: 57.98% (▲0.02pp)
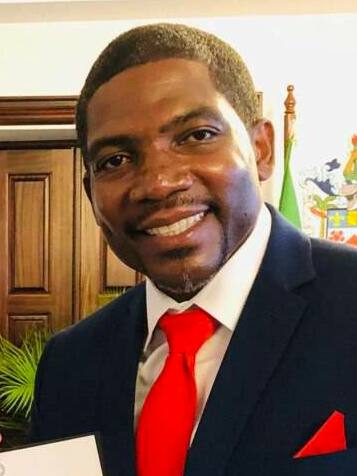

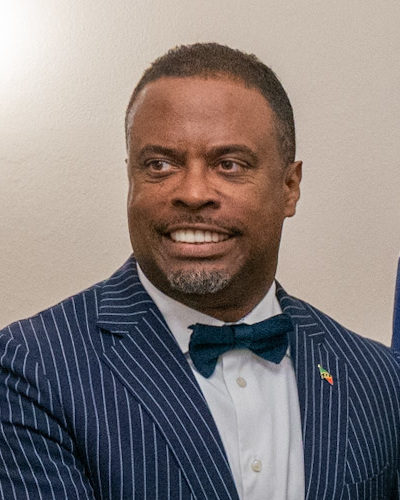

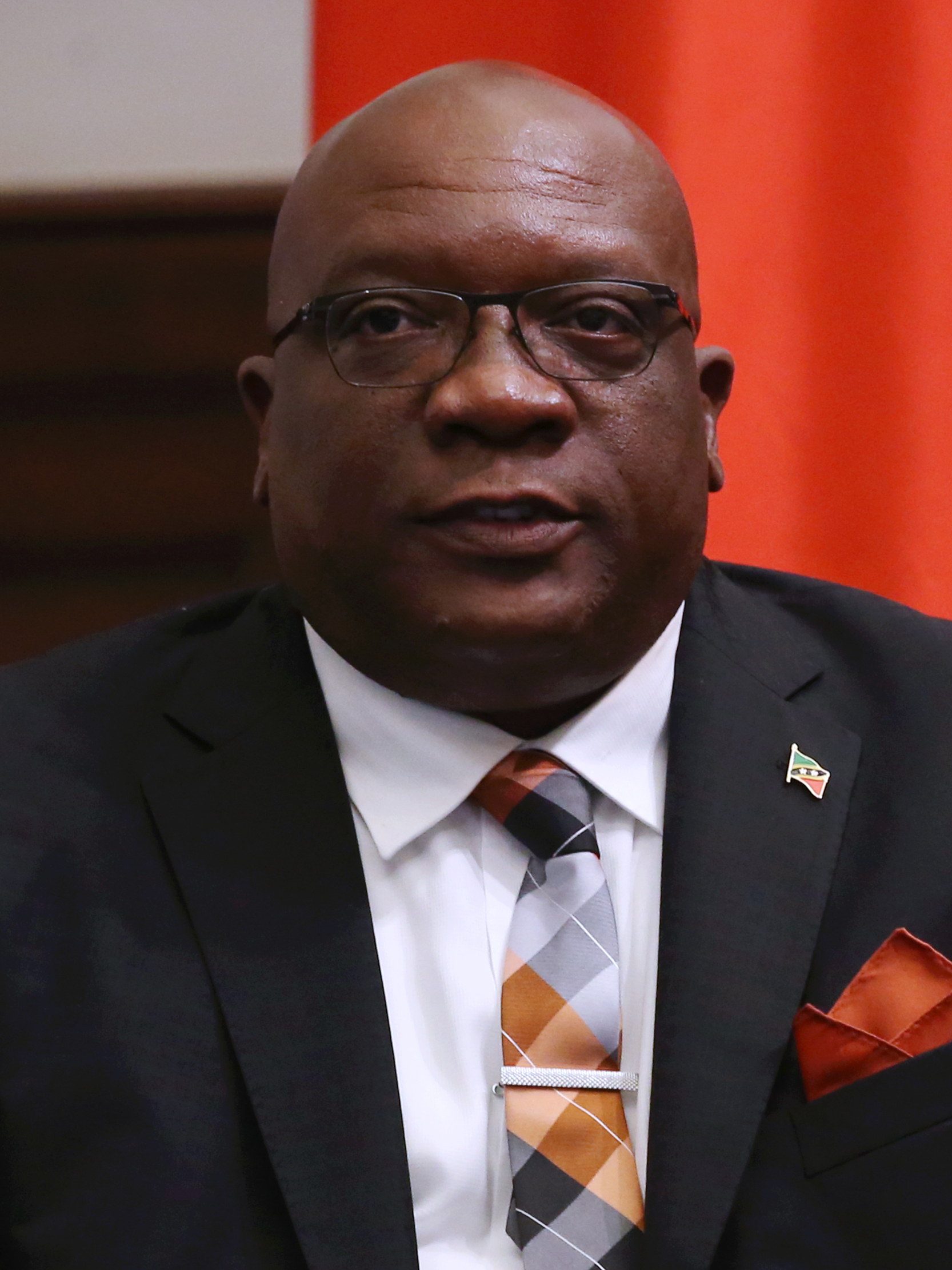

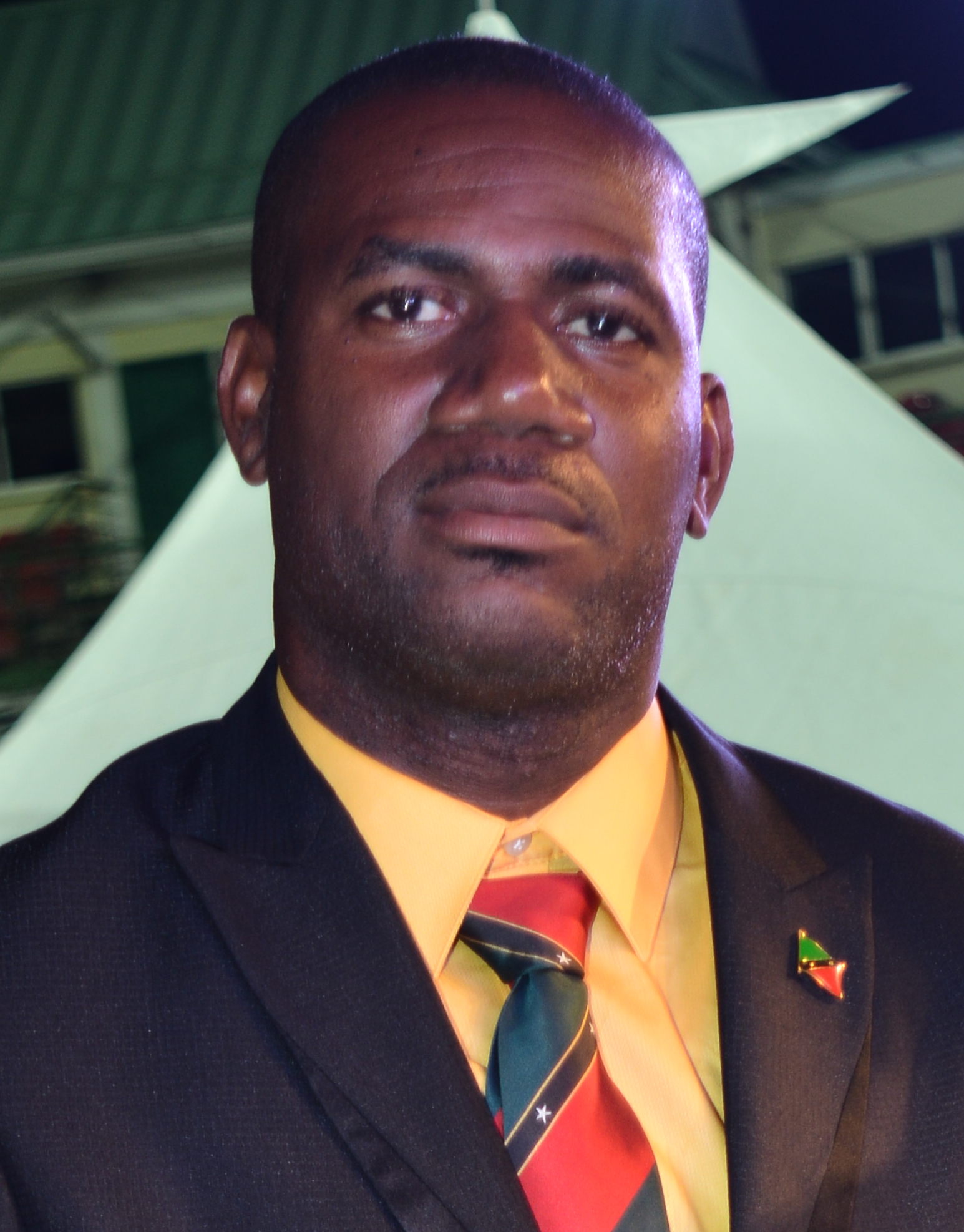
	First party	Second party
Leader	Terrance Drew	Mark Brantley
Party	SKNLP	CCM
Alliance		One Movement
Last election	37.09%, 2 seats	12.62%, 3 seats
Seats won	6	3
Seat change	▲4	Steady
Popular vote	13,438	3,473
Percentage	45.75%	11.82%
Swing	▲8.66pp	▼0.80pp
	Third party	Fourth party
Leader	Timothy Harris	Shawn Richards
Party	PLP	PAM
Alliance		One Movement
Last election	13.23%, 2 seats	29.00%, 4 seats
Seats won	1	1
Seat change	▼1	▼3
Popular vote	5,036	4,737
Percentage	17.14%	16.13%
Swing	▲3.91pp	▼12.87pp
- Results by constituency
Prime Minister before election
Timothy Harris
PLP
Elected Prime Minister
Terrance Drew
SKNLP

Snap general elections were held in Saint Kitts and Nevis on 5 August 2022, following the decision of incumbent prime minister Timothy Harris to dissolve the parliament on 11 May. Snap elections are constitutionally required within ninety days following the dissolution of parliament.

The elections were the first in the country with a female party leader, with businesswoman and environmental consultant Janice Daniel-Hodge leading the Nevis Reformation Party (NRP), which was founded by her father, former Premier of Nevis and pro-Nevis secessionist Simeon Daniel. However, the NRP failed to win a seat, despite seeing a small overall increase in its vote share.

The elections brought the Saint Kitts and Nevis Labour Party, led by Terrance Drew, back to power for the first time since their loss in 2015. The People's Action Movement, part of the outgoing ruling alliance in Harris government, was reduced to only one seat, their worst result since 2004, while their vote share of 16.23% was the worst in party history.

== Background ==
The Team Unity alliance first came to power in the 2015 elections, and won a second term in 2020. In 2022, tensions between PM Harris and his coalition partners led to them filing a motion of no confidence against him. The now in-opposition parties asked Governor-General Sir Tapley Seaton to dismiss Harris, prompting Seaton to remind them he does not have this power under the federation constitution. Harris responded by calling for the dissolution of parliament before the motion of no confidence was held.

== Electoral system ==
Eleven of the fifteen seats in the National Assembly are elected, with the other three members appointed by the Governor-General at some point after the elections and one seat held by the Attorney-General. The eleven elected seats are elected in single-member constituencies using plurality voting.

== Parties and Candidates ==
Six parties are contesting the election, three parties each contesting all seats in St. Kitts and three parties each contesting seats in Nevis:

1. People’s Labour Party (PLP): contesting all eight seats in St Kitts
2. St Kitts-Nevis Labour Party (SKNLP): contesting all eight seats in St Kitts
3. People’s Action Movement (PAM): contesting all eight seats in St Kitts (One Movement Alliance)
4. Concerned Citizens Movement (CCM): contesting all three seats in Nevis (One Movement Alliance)
5. Nevis Reformation Party (NRP): contesting all three seats in Nevis
6. Moral Restoration Movement (MRM): contesting two of the three seats in Nevis

== Endorsements ==
Janice Daniel-Hodge, Nevis Reformation Party (NRP) Political Leader

Politicians

- John de Jongh Jr., 7th Governor of the United States Virgin Islands (Democrat)

== Opinion polls ==
Date (Note: These are the survey dates of the poll, or if the survey dates are not stated, the date the poll was released.)	Pollster	Sample size	PAM	CCM	PLP	SKNLP	NRP	MRM	Govt
5 Aug 2022	2022 general election	–	1	3	1	6	0	0	6
July 26, 2022	Don Anderson/Market Research Services Limited (MRSL)	4000	–	1	–	–	2	0	N/A
July 23, 2022	Peter Wickham/Caribbean Development Research Services (CADRES)	N/A	–	–	4 (+2)	–	–	0	N/A
21 Apr 2022	Team Unity dissolves; splits into the PLP and One Movement (PAM & CCM)								
5 June 2020	2020 general election	–	4	3	2	2	0	–	9

== Results ==
Party	Votes	%	Seats	+/–
Saint Kitts and Nevis Labour Party	13,438	45.75	6	+4
People's Labour Party	5,036	17.14	1	–1
People's Action Movement	4,737	16.13	1	–3
Concerned Citizens' Movement	3,473	11.82	3	0
Nevis Reformation Party	2,616	8.91	0	0
Moral Restoration Movement	67	0.23	0	New
Unity Labour Party	5	0.02	0	New
Independents	3	0.01	0	0
Appointed and ex-officio members			4	0
Total	29,375	100.00	15	0
Valid votes	29,375	99.39		
Invalid/blank votes	179	0.61		
Total votes	29,554	100.00		
Registered voters/turnout	50,973	57.98		
Source: SKN Times

=== Elected MPs ===
Constituency	MPs	Party
St Christopher #1	Geoffrey Hanley	Saint Kitts and Nevis Labour Party
St Christopher #2	Marsha Henderson	Saint Kitts and Nevis Labour Party
St Christopher #3	Konris Maynard	Saint Kitts and Nevis Labour Party
St Christopher #4	Samal Duggins	Saint Kitts and Nevis Labour Party
St Christopher #5	Shawn Richards	People's Action Movement
St Christopher #6	Denzil Douglas	Saint Kitts and Nevis Labour Party
St Christopher #7	Timothy Harris	People's Labour Party
St Christopher #8	Terrance Drew	Saint Kitts and Nevis Labour Party
Nevis #9	Mark Brantley	Concerned Citizens' Movement
Nevis #10	Eric Evelyn	Concerned Citizens' Movement
Nevis #11	Alexis Jeffers	Concerned Citizens' Movement
Source: SKN Vibes

== Aftermath ==
Terrance Drew was elected Prime Minister of Saint Kitts and Nevis. The Drew ministry was sworn in on 15 August 2022.
