= Earl Asim Martin =

Saint Kitts and Nevis politician (born 1958)

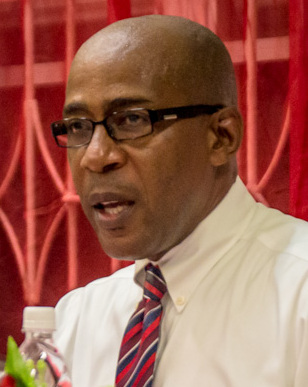

Deputy Prime Minister of Saint Kitts and Nevis
- In office February 2013 – February 2015
- Prime Minister: Denzil Douglas
- Preceded by: Sam Condor
- Succeeded by: Shawn Richards

Personal details
- Born: 1958 (age 67–68)
- Party: Labour Party
- Education: University of Havana

Earl Asim Martin (born 1958) is a Saint Kitts and Nevis politician and physician. He has been the National Chairperson of the Saint Kitts and Nevis Labour Party since 2021.

== Biography ==
Martin was born in Gingerland, Nevis, in 1958. He grew up at Bakers Corner in East Basseterre. In 1989, he completed his medical degree at the University of Havana in Cuba.

From 1993 to 2015, Martin represented the constituency of East Basseterre in the National Assembly as a member of the Saint Kitts and Nevis Labour Party (SKNLP). He held several government ministries: Minister of Housing, Minister of Utilities, Minister of Transport, and Minister of Public Works. He was appointed Deputy Prime Minister of Saint Kitts and Nevis in February 2013.

Martin was elected as National Chairperson of the SKNLP in November 2021.
