= Saint Kitts and Nevis–Trinidad and Tobago relations =

St. Kitts and Nevis-Trinidad and Tobago relations
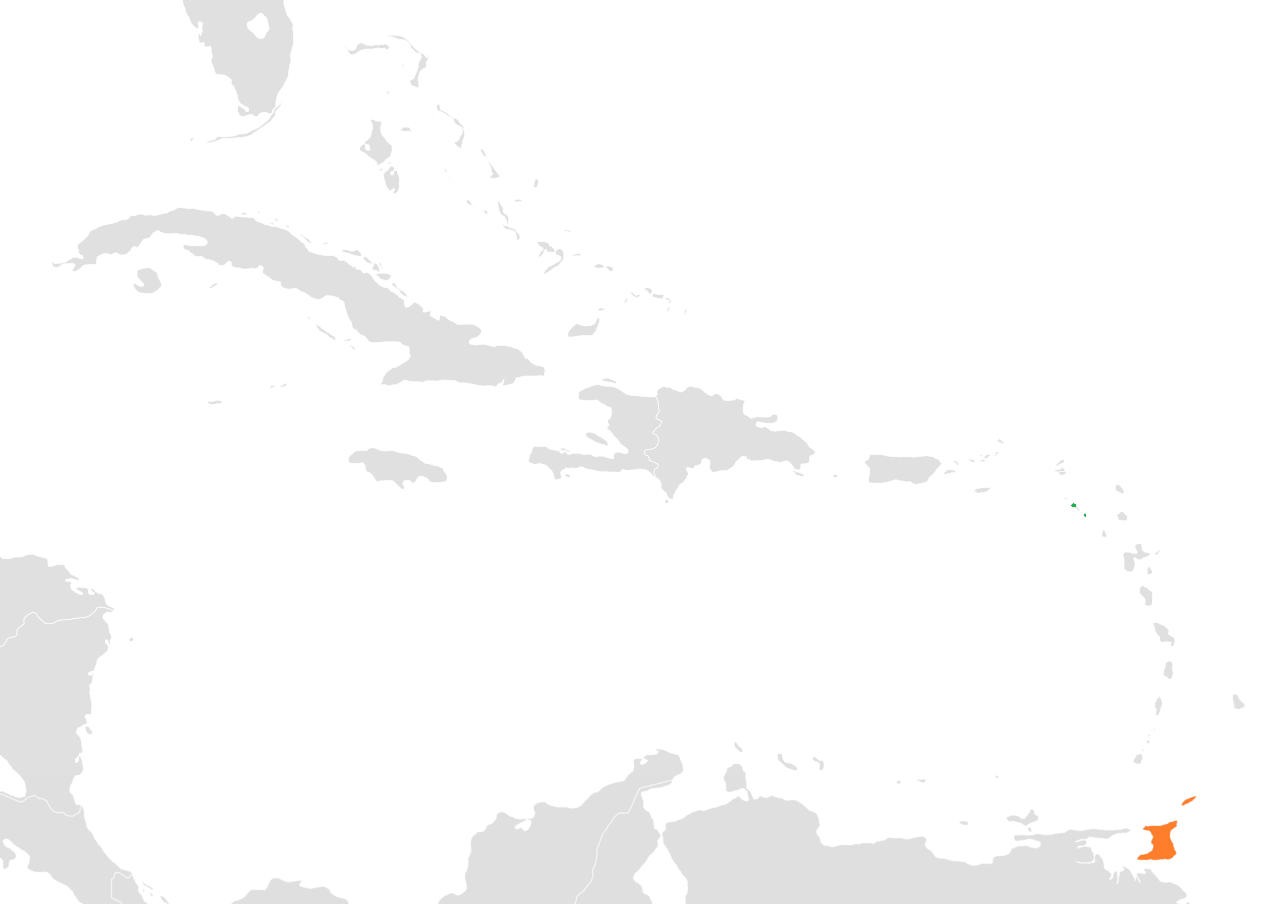

- Saint Kitts and Nevis: Trinidad and Tobago

Saint Kitts and Nevis-Trinidad and Tobago relations refers to the bilateral relations between Saint Kitts and Nevis and Trinidad and Tobago. Basseterre has a Trinidadian Consulate. Both countries are a part of Organization of American States, CARICOM and Commonwealth of Nations.

== History ==
Both nations share close ties due to being former colonies of the British Empire with similar demographics and being in the Caribbean. In 2017, Prime Minister Timothy Harris offered aid and financial support to Trinidad and Tobago during a severe rainy season. St Kitts and Nevis sent a delegation to attend a retreat on Trinidad regarding "building Caribbean resilience" in 2017. Among things discussed were dealing with natural disasters and creating a sustainable food supply chain.

== Trade ==
St. Kitts and Nevis exported 2.17 Million dollars' worth of goods to Trinidad in 2017, making Trinidad one of the largest export partners. Trinidad exported 13.1 Million dollars' worth of goods to St. Kitts in 2017.

== Sports ==
Both countries are part of the multi-national West Indies cricket team, with players from both countries representing the board.
