= List of prime ministers of Saint Kitts and Nevis =

Prime Minister of Saint Kitts and Nevis

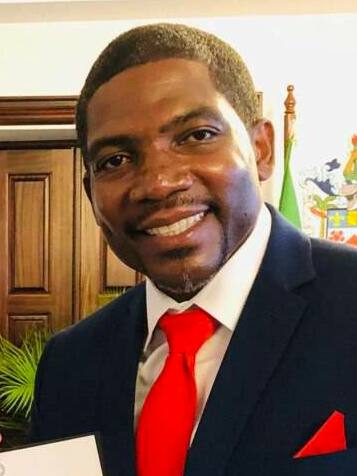
- Incumbent; Terrance Drew since 6 August 2022
- Style: Mr Prime Minister (informal); The Honourable (informal); The Right Honourable (within the Commonwealth); His Excellency (diplomatic)
- Type: Head of government
- Appointer: Governor-General
- Term length: No term limit
- Formation: 19 September 1983; 42 years ago
- First holder: Kennedy Simmonds
- Deputy: Deputy Prime Minister of Saint Kitts and Nevis
- Salary: EC$137,280 / US$50,844 annually
- Website: www.gov.kn

The prime minister of Saint Kitts and Nevis is the head of government of the Federation of Saint Christopher and Nevis. The current Prime Minister is Terrance Drew since 6 August 2022.

== Constitutional basis ==
The office of prime minister is established by section 52 of the constitution of Saint Kitts and Nevis, which provides that the governor-general must appoint the Representative in the National Assembly who "appears to him or her likely to command the support of the majority of the Representatives".

If a no-confidence motion in the prime minister is passed by the National Assembly, the prime minister must either resign with three days or advise the governor-general to dissolve the assembly and call a general election. If this does not occur, the governor-general must remove the prime minister from office. The office of prime minister also becomes vacant if the officeholder ceases to become a member of the National Assembly (other than by dissolution of parliament).

== Chief Ministers (1960–1967) ==
No.	Portrait	Name (Birth–Death)	Term of office			Political party	Election
No.	Portrait	Name (Birth–Death)	Took office	Left office	Time in office	Political party	Election
1	Paul Southwell	Paul Southwell (1913–1979)	1 January 1960	July 1966	6 years, 6 months	SKNLP	1961
2	Robert Llewellyn Bradshaw	Robert Llewellyn Bradshaw (1916–1978)	July 1966	27 February 1967	7 months	SKNLP	1966

== Premiers (1967–1983) ==
No.	Portrait	Name (Birth–Death)	Term of office			Political party	Election
No.	Portrait	Name (Birth–Death)	Took office	Left office	Time in office	Political party	Election
1	Robert Llewellyn Bradshaw	Robert Llewellyn Bradshaw (1916–1978)	27 February 1967	23 May 1978 †	11 years, 85 days	SKNLP	1971; 1975
2	Paul Southwell	Paul Southwell (1913–1979)	23 May 1978	18 May 1979 †	360 days	SKNLP	—
3	Lee Moore	Lee Moore (1939–2000)	20 May 1979	21 February 1980	277 days	SKNLP	—
4	Kennedy Simmonds	Kennedy Simmonds (born 1936)	21 February 1980	19 September 1983	3 years, 210 days	PAM	1980

== Prime Ministers (1983–present) ==
No.	Portrait	Name (Birth–Death)	Term of office			Political party	Election
No.	Portrait	Name (Birth–Death)	Took office	Left office	Time in office	Political party	Election
1	Kennedy Simmonds	Kennedy Simmonds (born 1936)	19 September 1983	7 July 1995	11 years, 291 days	PAM	1984; 1989; 1993
2	Denzil Douglas	Denzil Douglas (born 1953)	7 July 1995	18 February 2015	19 years, 226 days	SKNLP	1995; 2000; 2004; 2010
3	Timothy Harris	Timothy Harris (born 1964)	18 February 2015	6 August 2022	7 years, 169 days	PLP	2015; 2020
4	Terrance Drew	Terrance Drew (born 1976)	6 August 2022	Incumbent	4 years, 32 days	SKNLP	2022

== Timeline ==
This is a graphical lifespan timeline of the prime ministers of Saint Kitts and Nevis. They are listed in order of first assuming office.

The following chart lists prime ministers by lifespan (living prime ministers on the green line), with the years outside of their tenure in beige.

== See also ==
- Governor-General of Saint Kitts and Nevis
- Deputy Prime Minister of Saint Kitts and Nevis
- Premier of Nevis
