= Hugh Heyliger =

Kittitian politician (1945–2026)

Hugh C. Heyliger

Deputy Prime Minister of Saint Kitts and Nevis
- In office November 1994 – July 1995
- Prime Minister: Kennedy Simmonds
- Preceded by: Sydney Earl Morris
- Succeeded by: Sam Condor

Personal details
- Born: 27 July 1945 Sandy Point Town, Saint Kitts and Nevis, British Leeward Islands
- Died: 13 June 2026 (aged 80) Basseterre, Saint Kitts and Navis
- Party: People's Action Movement
- Education: College of the Virgin Islands; Illinois State University

Hugh C. Heyliger (27 July 1945 – 13 June 2026) was a Kittitian politician who served as deputy prime minister of Saint Kitts and Nevis.

== Life and career ==
Heyliger was born in Sandy Point Town on 27 July 1945. Educated in economics in the College of the Virgin Islands and Illinois State University. He was the director of the planning unit of the Government of St Kitts and Nevis from 1980 to 1984.

During the PAM-led government of Kennedy Simmonds, Heyliger was minister of agriculture, lands, housing and development since 1989. He was also appointed deputy prime minister and minister of education in November 1994 to succeed Sydney Morris. His term ended in the PAM defeat in the 1995 elections.

He was appointed the Leader of the Opposition in 1995, however, he lost his seat in the 2000 elections.

Heyliger died at his home in Basseterre, on 13 June 2026, at the age of 80. The government declared three days of national mourning from 7 July to 9 July in his honour.
