= Eric Evelyn =

Deputy Premier of Nevis

The Honourable Eric Evelyn

Deputy Premier of Nevis
- Incumbent
- Assumed office December 2022
- Premier: Mark Brantley

Personal details
- Party: Concerned Citizens' Movement

Eric Rohan Evelyn is a Nevisian politician serving as a member of both the Saint Kitts and Nevis National Assembly and Nevis Island Assembly. He has been Deputy Premier of Nevis since December 2022.

== Early life and career ==
Evelyn grew up and went to school in Gingerland, and later studied at the Charlestown Sixth Form College. He holds a diploma in Agriculture from the Eastern Caribbean Institute of Agriculture and Forestry in Trinidad and a diploma in Agricultural Extension from the University of the West Indies. Prior to entering politics, he had worked in the Ministry of Agriculture for 32 years and at the time of his retirement from the civil service, was the ministry's Permanent Secretary.

== Political career ==
=== Nevis politics ===
Evelyn was first elected to the Nevis Island Assembly for the St George's Gingerland Parish/electoral district #3 at the 2017 Nevis Island Assembly election, representing the Concerned Citizens' Movement. Shortly after the election, he was appointed to the Nevis Island Administration (NIA) Cabinet as Minister of Culture, Youth, Sports, Community Development and Telecommunications and Information. He was re-elected at the 2022 Nevis Island Assembly election, and was re-appointed to the NIA Cabinet as Deputy Premier of Nevis and Minister for Agriculture, Lands, Natural Resources, Fisheries, Cooperatives, Culture, and Housing.

=== Federal politics ===
Evelyn was first elected to the federal National Assembly at the 2020 general election for the Nevis #10 constituency. Following this election in which CCM and its allies in Team Unity won a majority, Evelyn was appointed to the federal cabinet as Minister for the Environment and Cooperatives. At the 2022 snap election, he was re-elected, however Labour won a majority and the CCM became an opposition party.

== Personal life ==
Evelyn is a cousin of Siela Bynoe, a state senator in New York.
