= 1984 Saint Kitts and Nevis general election =

- 25 July 1984

11 of the 15 seats in the National Assembly 6 seats needed for a majority
- Registered: 24,421
- Turnout: 74.27% (▼0.27pp)
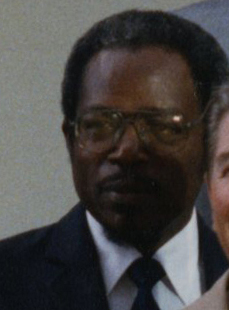
	First party	Second party	Third party
		SKNLP	NRP
Leader	Kennedy Simmonds	Lee Moore	Simeon Daniel
Party	PAM	SKNLP	NRP
Seats won	6	2	3
Seat change	▲3	▼2	▲1
Popular vote	8,596	7,463	1,830
Percentage	47.58%	41.31%	10.13%
Swing	▲13.65pp	▼8.70pp	▼5.89pp
Prime Minister before election
Kennedy Simmonds
PAM–NRP
Elected Prime Minister
Kennedy Simmonds
PAM–NRP

General elections were held in Saint Kitts and Nevis on 25 July 1984. The result was a victory for the People's Action Movement (PAM), which won six of the eleven directly-elected seats. The ruling coalition of PAM and the Nevis Reformation Party continued as a result of the elections.

== Results ==
Party	Votes	%	Seats	+/–
People's Action Movement	8,596	47.58	6	+3
Saint Kitts and Nevis Labour Party	7,463	41.31	2	–2
Nevis Reformation Party	1,830	10.13	3	+1
People's Democratic Party	144	0.80	0	New
Kelsick and Wilkin Monopoly Breakers	32	0.18	0	New
Appointed members			4	New
Total	18,065	100.00	15	+2
Valid votes	18,065	99.60		
Invalid/blank votes	73	0.40		
Total votes	18,138	100.00		
Registered voters/turnout	24,421	74.27		
Source: Caribbean Elections
