= 1980 Saint Kitts and Nevis general election =

- 18 February 1980

9 of the 13 seats in the National Assembly 7 seats needed for a majority
- Registered: 19,921
- Turnout: 74.54% (▲2.67pp)
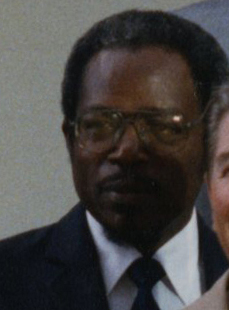
	First party	Second party	Third party
	SKNLP		NRP
Leader	Lee Moore	Kennedy Simmonds	Simeon Daniel
Party	SKNLP	PAM	NRP
Seats won	4	3	2
Seat change	▼3	▲3	Steady
Popular vote	7,335	4,990	2,356
Percentage	50.01%	33.93%	16.02%
Premier before election
Lee Moore
SKNLP
Elected Premier
Kennedy Simmonds
PAM–NRP

General elections were held in Saint Kitts and Nevis on 18 February 1980. Although the Saint Kitts and Nevis Labour Party won a plurality of the elected seats, the People's Action Movement (PAM) were able to form a coalition government with the Nevis Reformation Party which held a one-seat majority. PAM leader Kennedy Simmonds became Premier. Voter turnout was 74.5%.

== Results ==
Party	Votes	%	Seats	+/–
Saint Kitts and Nevis Labour Party	7,355	50.01	4	–3
People's Action Movement	4,990	33.93	3	+3
Nevis Reformation Party	2,356	16.02	2	0
Independents	6	0.04	0	0
Appointed members			4	0
Total	14,707	100.00	13	0
Valid votes	14,707	99.04		
Invalid/blank votes	143	0.96		
Total votes	14,850	100.00		
Registered voters/turnout	19,921	74.54		
Source: Nohlen
