= Shawn Richards =

Saint Kitts and Nevis politician (born 1972)

The Honourable Shawn Richards
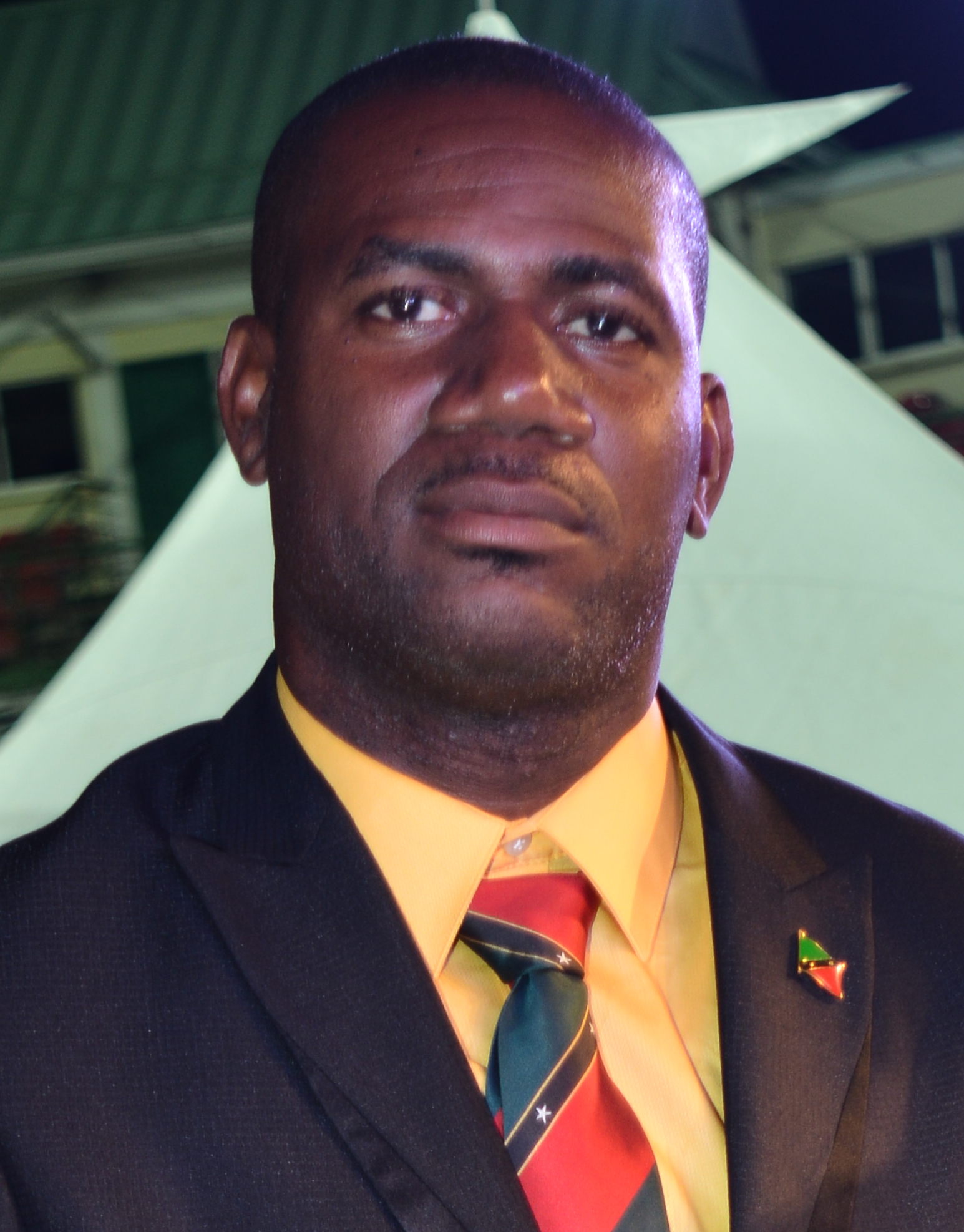

Deputy Prime Minister of Saint Kitts and Nevis
- In office 22 February 2015 – May 2022
- Prime Minister: Timothy Harris
- Preceded by: Earl Asim Martin
- Succeeded by: Eugene Hamilton

Minister of Education, Youth, Sport and Culture
- In office 22 February 2015 – 2022?
- Prime Minister: Timothy Harris

Personal details
- Born: Shawn Kenneth Richards; 8 December 1972 (age 53)
- Party: People's Action Movement
- Education: Cleveland State University, University of the Virgin Islands

Shawn Kenneth Richards (born 8 December 1972) is a Kittitian politician serving as leader of the People's Action Movement (PAM) and as a member of the National Assembly. He served as Deputy Prime Minister of Saint Kitts and Nevis from 2015 to 2022 in the Team Unity government.

== Political career ==
Richards was first elected as a member of the National Assembly of Saint Kitts and Nevis for the St Christopher #5 constituency in the 2010 election, and was re-elected at the 2015, 2020, and 2022 elections. In 2012, he became leader of PAM.

Richards was the Deputy Prime Minister of Saint Kitts and Nevis from 2015 until 2022, when he was fired by Timothy Harris upon the collapse of the Team Unity alliance. In 2024, he stepped down as leader of PAM, and was succeeded by Natasha Grey-Brookes. In September 2026, Richards returned as PAM's leader following the resignation of Grey-Brookes as leader.

== Other activities ==
Richards completed his higher education in the United States at Cleveland State University and then the University of the Virgin Islands. He qualified as a Certified Public Accountant in 2002 and worked as an auditor in Saint Kitts and Nevis. He renounced his American citizenship in 2009 during the debate on the National Assembly Elections (Amendment) Bill, which barred dual citizens from standing for election.
