= Natasha Grey-Brookes =

Saint Kitts and Nevis politician (born 1981)

Leader of the People’s Action Movement
- In office 9 June 2024 – 31 July 2026
- Preceded by: Shawn Richards

Personal details
- Born: 26 October 1981 (age 44)
- Party: People's Action Movement
- Education: University of Huddersfield; City Law School, London; Norman Manley Law School

Natasha Grey-Brookes (born 26 October 1981) is an attorney and politician from Saint Kitts and Nevis who from June 2024 to July 2026 was the leader of the People’s Action Movement (PAM), a significant political party in the federation.

== Legal career ==
In 2007, Grey-Brookes began studying law at the University of Huddersfield and graduated in 2010. She then started a Bar Professional Training Course at the City Law School in London, graduating in 2011. In 2012, she graduated from the Norman Manley Law School with a Legal Education Certificate. She was called to the Bar in St Kitts and Nevis in July 2012, and is still practicing law.

== Political career ==
Grey-Brookes became General Secretary of the People’s Action Movement (PAM) in 2019. In the 2022 general election, she stood as the PAM candidate for East Basseterre (constituency #1), coming second to the Saint Kitts and Nevis Labour Party. In May 2024, following Shawn Richards’ announcement he would step down as leader of PAM, Grey-Brookes launched her candidacy to succeed him as leader. In June 2024, she was officially elected as leader of PAM at their 58th National Convention, becoming the party’s fifth leader and the first woman to become leader of PAM and of a political party on the island of Saint Kitts. In July 2026, Grey-Brookes was inducted as an honorary member of Sigma Gamma Rho as part of the 2026 Honorary Membership Class.

On 27 July 2026, Grey-Brookes announced her intention to resign as PAM leader, formally stepping down from the position on 31 July 2026.
