= Moral Restoration Movement =

- Leader: Samuel Caines
- Founded: August 2021
- National Assembly (Nevisian Seats): 0 / 3
- Nevis Island Assembly: 0 / 5

The Moral Restoration Movement (MRM) is a Nevis-based minor political party in Saint Kitts and Nevis. It does not hold any representation in either the National Assembly or Nevis Island Assembly.

== History ==
The MRM was publicly launched on 10 August 2021 by party leader Samuel Caines. In October 2021, Caines announced they had two candidates confirmed for a future Nevis Island Assembly election and that they were seeking a third.

In the snap 2022 Saint Kitts and Nevis general election for the federal election to the National Assembly, the MRM nominated two candidates. The party won 45 votes (1.5%) in the Nevis #9 constituency and 22 votes (1.0%) in the Nevis #11 constituency, a total of 67 votes (0.2% federally).

In the 2022 Nevis Island Assembly election, the party nominated two candidates for the Nevis #2 and Nevis #4 electoral districts, winning 0.7% in both seats and a total of 28 votes (0.37%) and no seats.

== Election results ==
=== National Assembly ===
Election year	Party leader	# of votes	% of vote	# of Nevisian seats won	+/–	Govt?
2022	Samuel Caines	67	0.23 (#6)	0 / 11	New	Extra-parliamentary

=== Nevis Island Assembly ===
Election year	Party leader	# of votes	% of vote	# of Nevisian seats won	+/–	Govt?
2022	Samuel Caines	28	0.37 (#3)	0 / 5	New	Extra-parliamentary
