= 2010 Saint Kitts and Nevis general election =

- 25 January 2010

11 of 15 seats in the National Assembly 6 seats needed for a majority
- Registered: 32,764
- Turnout: 79.81% (▲21.30pp)
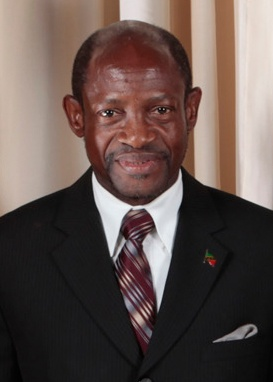

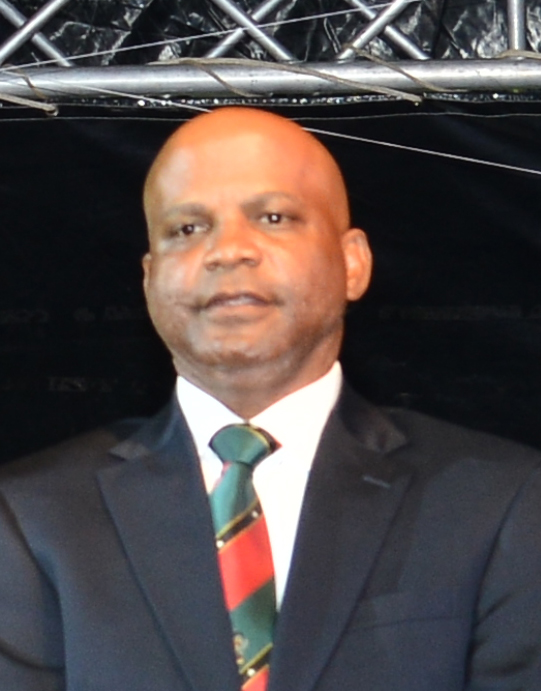

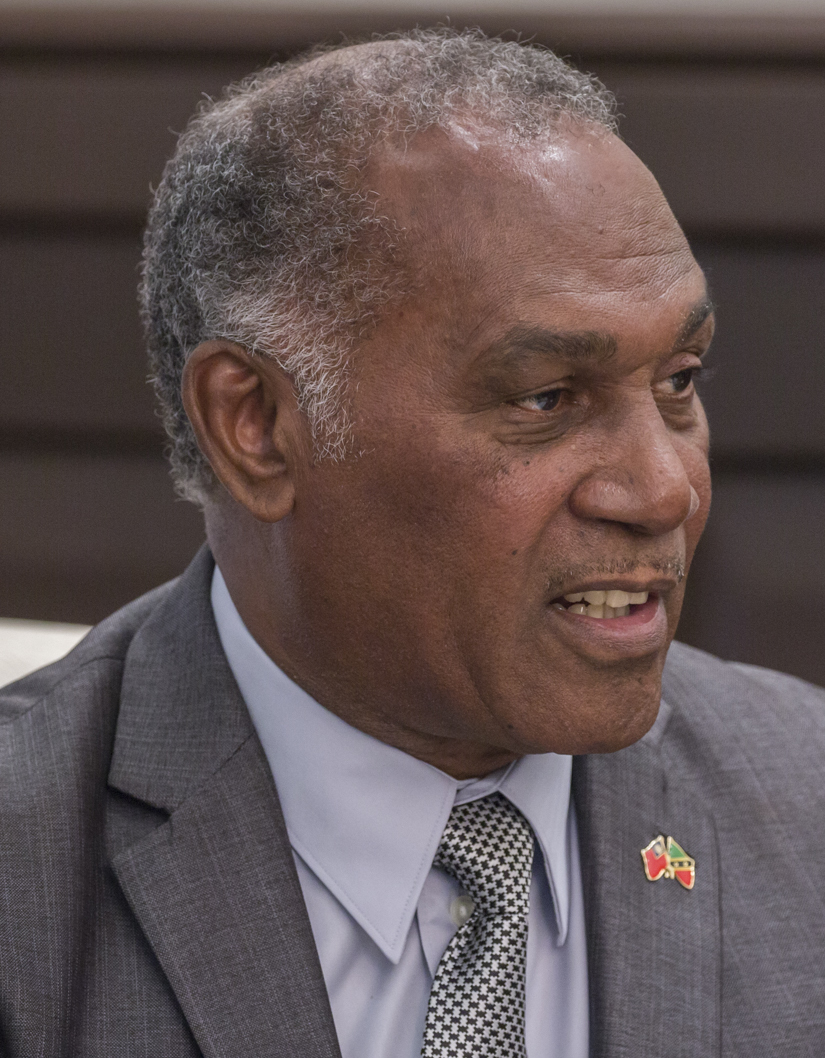

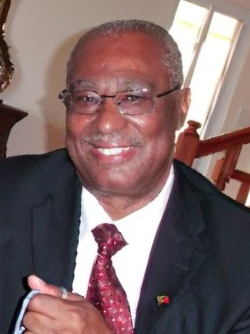
	First party	Second party
Leader	Denzil Douglas	Lindsay Grant
Party	SKNLP	PAM
Last election	50.6%, 7 seats	31.7%, 1 seat
Seats won	6	2
Seat change	▼1	▲1
Popular vote	12,227	8,393
Percentage	47.0%	32.2%
Swing	▼3.6pp	▲0.5pp
	Third party	Fourth party
Leader	Vance Amory	Joseph Parry
Party	CCM	NRP
Last election	8.8%, 2 seats	7.5%, 1 seat
Seats won	2	1
Seat change	Steady	Steady
Popular vote	2,860	2,539
Percentage	11.0%	9.8%
Swing	▲2.2pp	▲2.3pp
- Results by constituency
Prime Minister before election
Denzil Douglas
SKNLP
Elected Prime Minister
Denzil Douglas
SKNLP

General elections were held in Saint Kitts and Nevis on 25 January 2010 for eleven of the fourteen or fifteen seats in the National Assembly. The other three or four members of the National Assembly will be appointed by the Governor-General after the elections.

The ruling Saint Kitts and Nevis Labour Party (SKNLP), led by Prime Minister Denzil Douglas, won a fourth term in office. It was opposed in the campaign by the opposition People's Action Movement (PAM), led by Lindsay Grant. Both parties received much of their support from the island of Saint Kitts, which chooses eight of the eleven elected members of the National Assembly.

On the neighboring island of Nevis, local parties, including the Nevis Reformation Party (NRP) and the Concerned Citizens' Movement (CCM), vied for three seats in the National Assembly. Support from Nevisian political parties could decide control of the national government in a tight election.

The continuing economic crisis was a major issue in the campaign. The national debt of Saint Kitts and Nevis had risen to US$2 billion under the SKNLP government, roughly $50,000 per citizen. Prime Minister Denzil Douglas shrugged off accusations that he had let the debt spiral upward during his fifteen years in office:

It is important for me to state that St. Kitts and Nevis has never missed any payments on the national debt under Labour. This is very important. Many countries owe less, but are repeatedly unable to service their debt.

== Background ==
Before the 2010 election, the Labour Party controlled seven of the eight seats allocated to the island of Saint Kitts in the Assembly. The opposition People's Action Movement (PAM) controlled the other Saint Kitts seat. From nearby Nevis, the Concerned Citizens' Movement (CCM) controlled two of Nevis' three seats in the Assembly, while the opposition Nevis Reformation Party (NRP) controlled the other seat.

Prime Minister Douglas, speaking to a crowd of approximately 15,000 in Basseterre on 9 January 2010, announced the dates for the upcoming election. He set Nomination Day for 15 January 2010, with the general election to be held on 25 January.

== Conduct ==
Armed police had to respond to protests alleging voting irregularities in the constituency where the PAM leader Lindsay Grant was up against Glen "Ghost" Phillips of the SKNLP. PAM supporters contended that "outsiders" were being brought into the Half Way Tree Community Centre, seven miles (11 km) from the capital Basseterre, to vote. Elsewhere in the country, voting was reported to be calm "amidst overcast skies following some intermittent morning showers."

According to 2022 reporting by the OCCRP, there is evidence that Henley and Partners CEO Christian Kälin helped to finance the campaign of Denzil Douglas. Henley had set up a passport selling scheme in St. Kitts and Nevis during Douglas's tenure. At the same time, Henley entered into at least three agreements with the SCL Group or its affiliated companies to help each other in the Caribbean region. Henley has denied financing the Douglas campaign. However, Douglas stated in an unpublished 2018 interview that Henley did fund his campaign and that the SCL Group was hired to manage the campaign. Henley responded by calling Douglas a liar.

== Results ==
On Saint Kitts, the SKNLP won six out of the eight seats. The PAM gained a new National Assembly member, Eugene Hamilton, while PAM deputy leader Shawn Richards retained his seat. Prime Minister Denzil Douglas retained his seat for Constituency Six by a margin of 1905 votes to 179.

On Nevis, the Concerned Citizens' Movement (CCM) won two seats, with the Nevis Reformation Party (NRP) taking the third.

Party	Votes	%	Seats	+/–
Saint Kitts and Nevis Labour Party	12,227	46.96	6	–1
People's Action Movement	8,393	32.24	2	+1
Concerned Citizens' Movement	2,860	10.99	2	0
Nevis Reformation Party	2,539	9.75	1	0
Independents	16	0.06	0	New
Appointed members			4	0
Total	26,035	100.00	15	0
Valid votes	26,035	99.56		
Invalid/blank votes	115	0.44		
Total votes	26,150	100.00		
Registered voters/turnout	32,764	79.81		
Source: Caribbean Elections
