= Life Office Management Association =

Trade association for the US life insurance industry

LOMA
- Predecessor: Life Office Management Association and Life Insurance Marketing and Research Association
- Established: 1930s
- Type: Professional association and Trade association
- Legal status: Association
- Professional title: FLMI (Fellow, Life Management Institute)
- Location: Atlanta, Georgia, United States
- Region served: Worldwide
- Products: Professional education, research, advocacy
- Official language: English
- President: David Levenson
- Parent organization: LL Global
- Funding: Members
- Website: www.loma.org

LOMA, (formerly the Life Office Management Association) working together with LIMRA (formerly Life Insurance Marketing and Research Association) under the umbrella organization LL Global is an American trade associations for the insurance industry in the United States.

LOMA offers an employee training and development program used by the majority of American life insurance companies, and by life insurance companies in over 70 other countries worldwide. The president and CEO of LL Global is David Levenson.

LOMA administers a series of designation programs. The Fellow, Life Management Institute (FLMI) designation program, awards the FLMI designation to individuals who pass a series of 10 examinations; these insurance-focused examinations cover insurance, accounting, marketing, information systems, finance, law, management, and computers. Brokers also use the LOMA educational courses to count towards the continuing professional education (CPE) requirement needed to maintain their license in good standing with regulators.

LOMA's board of directors is made up of insurance industry chief executive officers, presidents and vice-presidents, lawyers and other industry professionals.

== History ==
The National Life Office Management Association "in the early nineteen thirties was one of the first management societies or trade associations to assign an increasingly prominent role to some kind of selective records preservation in the programs of their annual meetings and in the work projects of their research groups."

LOMA developed a series of merit rating scales for clerical employees based on traits and behavioral elements, published in 1950.

== Designations and examinations ==
As of 2018, below are some of the designations offered by LOMA, as well as their associated courses/exams.

Courses and designations
Designation	Papers	Theme
Level I	LOMA 280 or LOMA 281	Principles of Insurance
Level I	LOMA 290 or LOMA 291	Insurance Company Operations
Associate, Life Management Institute (ALMI)	All papers in Level I	
Associate, Life Management Institute (ALMI)	LOMA 301 or LOMA 302	Insurance Administration
Associate, Life Management Institute (ALMI)	LOMA 307 or LOMA 308	Business and Financial Concepts for Insurance Professionals
Associate, Life Management Institute (ALMI)	LOMA 320 or LOMA 321	Insurance Marketing
Fellow, Life Management Institute (FLMI)	All papers in ALMI	
Fellow, Life Management Institute (FLMI)	LOMA 311	Business Law for Financial Services Professionals
Fellow, Life Management Institute (FLMI)	LOMA 335	Operational Excellence in Financial Services
Fellow, Life Management Institute (FLMI)	LOMA 357	Institutional Investing: Principles and Practices
Fellow, Life Management Institute (FLMI)	LOMA 361	Accounting and Financial Reporting in Life Insurance Companies
Fellow, Life Management Institute (FLMI)	LOMA 371	Risk Management and Product Design for Insurance Companies
Fellow, Secure Retirement Institute FSRI®	SRI 111 SRI 121 SRI 131 SRI 210 SRI 220 SRI 230 SRI 240 SRI 500	SRI 111 — Retirement Fundamentals SRI 121 — Retirement Plans, Accounts, and Annuities SRI 131 — Planning for a Secure Retirement SRI 210 — Successful Retirement Outcomes SRI 220 — Retirement Marketing and Business Acquisition SRI 230 — Retirement Administration SRI 240 — Profitability in the Retirement Business SRI 500 — Transforming Retirement Security

=== Customer service ===
Designation	Requirement	Papers	Theme
Associate, Customer Service (ACS)	Compulsory - must complete all the papers	ACS 100 or ACS 101	Foundations of Customer Service
Associate, Customer Service (ACS)	Compulsory - must complete all the papers	LOMA 280 or LOMA 281	Principles of Insurance
Associate, Customer Service (ACS)	Compulsory - must complete all the papers	LOMA 290 or LOMA 291	Insurance Company Operations
Associate, Customer Service (ACS)	Elective - complete two out of three	LOMA 301 or LOMA 302	Insurance Administration
Associate, Customer Service (ACS)	Elective - complete two out of three	LOMA 307 or LOMA 308	Business and Financial Concepts for Insurance Professionals
Associate, Customer Service (ACS)	Elective - complete two out of three	LOMA 320 or LOMA 321	Insurance Marketing
