= 1975 Saint Kitts-Nevis-Anguilla general election =

General elections were held in Saint Kitts-Nevis-Anguilla on 1 December 1975. The result was a victory for the Saint Kitts-Nevis-Anguilla Labour Party, which won seven of the nine seats.

== Results ==
Party	Votes	%	Seats	+/–
Saint Kitts-Nevis-Anguilla Labour Party	7,363	60.17	7	0
People's Action Movement	2,586	21.13	0	–1
Nevis Reformation Party	1,987	16.24	2	+1
Independents	302	2.47	0	New
Appointed members			4	0
Total	12,238	100.00	13	0
Valid votes	12,238	96.28		
Invalid/blank votes	473	3.72		
Total votes	12,711	100.00		
Registered voters/turnout	17,685	71.87		
Source: Caribbean Elections
