= Deputy Prime Minister of Saint Kitts and Nevis =

The Deputy Prime Minister of Saint Kitts and Nevis is an elected representative in the National Assembly who is appointed by the Governor General on the advice of the Prime Minister. Historically, the person appointed to the position of Deputy Prime Minister is usually the Deputy Leader of the political party that holds the majority of seats in the national assembly or the Leader of another party in the case of a coalition government. The instrument of appointment of the Deputy Prime Minister can be found in the Constitution of St. Christopher and Nevis. The Deputy Prime Minister appointment can be revoked by the Governor General on the advice of the Prime Minister of Saint Kitts and Nevis.

== Deputy Premiers 1967-1983 ==
Name	Took office	Left office	Party	Notes
Paul Southwell	1967	1978	SKNLP	
Lee Moore	1978	1979	SKNLP	
Charles Egbert Mills	1979	1980	SKNLP	
Michael Oliver Powell	1980	1983	PAM	

== Deputy Prime Ministers since 1983 ==
Name	Took office	Left office	Party	Notes
Michael Oliver Powell	September 1983	1992	PAM	
Sydney Earl Morris	April 1992	November 1994	PAM	
Hugh Heyliger	November 1994	July 1995	PAM	
Sam Condor	July 1995	February 2013	SKNLP	
Earl Asim Martin	February 2013	February 2015	SKNLP	
Shawn Richards	February 2015	May 2022	PAM	
Eugene Hamilton	May 2022	August 2022	PAM	
Geoffrey Hanley	August 2022	Incumbent	SKNLP	

== See also ==
- Prime Minister of Saint Kitts and Nevis
- Politics of Saint Kitts and Nevis
