= Terrance Drew =

Prime Minister of Saint Kitts and Nevis (2022–present)

The Honourable Terrance Drew
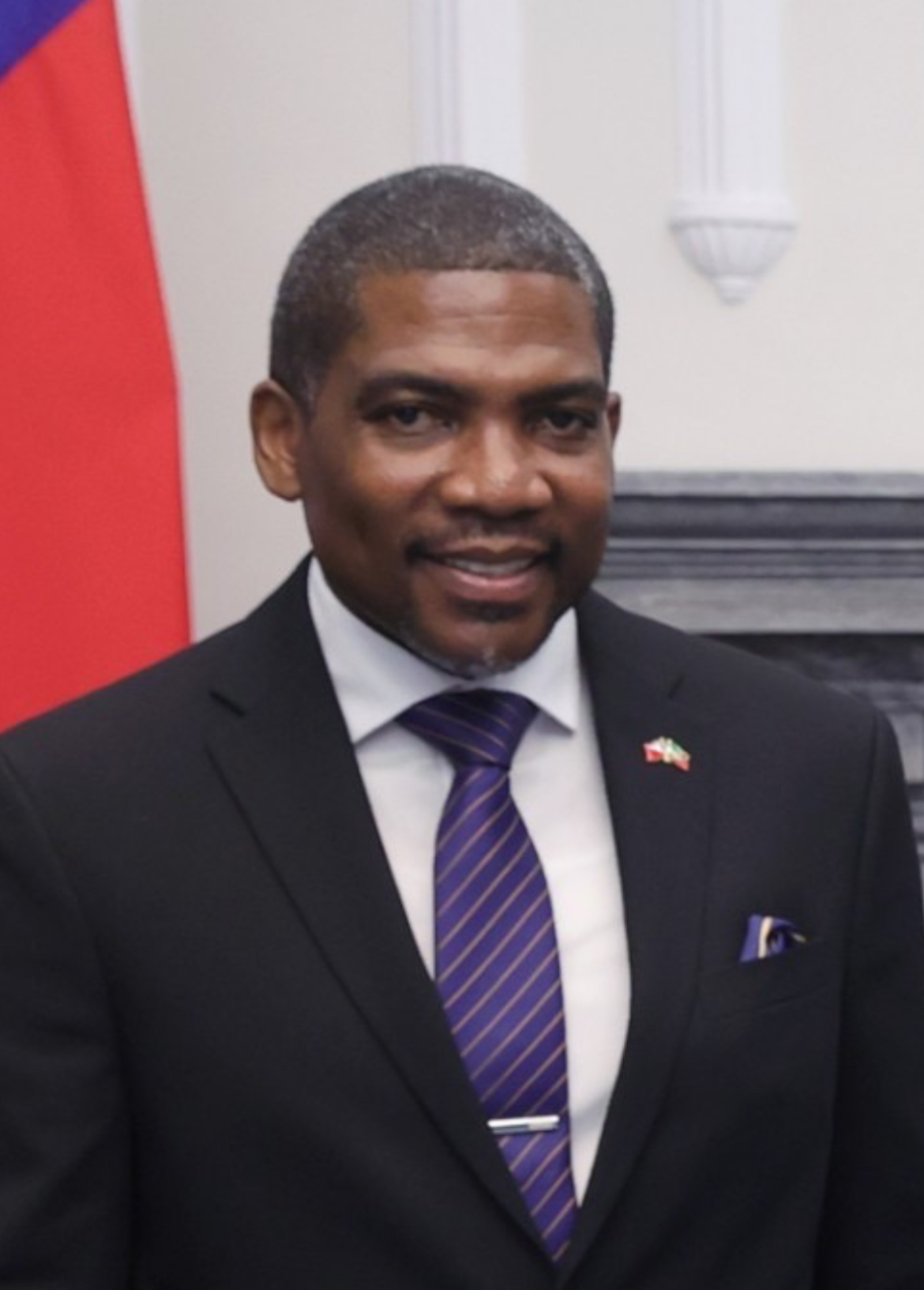
- Drew in 2024

4th Prime Minister of Saint Kitts and Nevis
- Incumbent
- Assumed office 6 August 2022
- Monarchs: Elizabeth II; Charles III
- Governors-General: Tapley Seaton; Marcella Liburd
- Deputy: Geoffrey Hanley
- Preceded by: Timothy Harris

Minister of Finance
- Incumbent
- Assumed office August 2022
- Prime Minister: Himself
- Preceded by: Timothy Harris

Chairman of the Caribbean Community
- In office 1 January 2026 – 30 June 2026
- Preceded by: Andrew Holness
- Succeeded by: Philip J. Pierre

Personal details
- Born: Terrance Michael Drew; 22 November 1976 (age 49) Saint Christopher-Nevis-Anguilla (now Saint Kitts and Nevis)
- Party: Saint Kitts and Nevis Labour Party
- Spouse: Diani Prince-Drew (m. 2024)
- Children: 1

Terrance Michael Drew (born 22 November 1976) is a Kittitian medical doctor and politician who has served as the fourth and current prime minister of Saint Kitts and Nevis since 2022, and as leader of the Labour Party since 2021.

== Early life and career ==
Dr. Terrance Drew is the son of Ras Gerzel Pet Mills and Michael ‘Mic Stokes’ Heyliger. He graduated from the Clarence Fitzroy Bryant College in 1996. At the age of 19, he was a part time teacher at the Basseterre High School. In 1998, he went to Cuba to study medicine, and graduated from the Universidad de Ciencias Médicas de Villa Clara in Santa Clara. Drew then returned to Saint Kitts to work as a general practitioner. In 2010, he went to El Paso, Texas to complete his residency in internal medicine and graduated from Texas Tech University Health Sciences Center in 2013. Dr. Drew obtained his certification from the American Board of Internal Medicine in 2016.

== Political career ==
Drew unsuccessfully contested constituency #8 for Labour in the 2015 and 2020 elections, losing to Eugene Hamilton from the People's Action Movement.

He was elected as the leader of Labour on November 28, 2021 in the leadership election held at the party conference, where he garnered 45% of the votes cast.

In the snap general election held on 5 August 2022, he was elected as the member of parliament for constituency #8, and led the Labour Party to winning a majority with six of eleven seats in parliament. The Drew ministry was officially sworn in on 15 August 2022, with Drew leading the government as prime minister, and holding the portfolios of Minister of Finance, National Security, Citizenship and Immigration, Health and Human Resource Management and Social Security. He is also a member of the Monetary Council of the Eastern Caribbean Central Bank.

In November 2022, Drew made the declaration in his remarks at the Bitcoin Cash 2022 conference that took place in St. Kitts that Bitcoin Cash (BCH) could be made legal tender in the nation by March 2023.

In 2023, following the coronation of King Charles III, Drew stated that his government would take public consultation regarding the republic movement.

== Personal life ==
On 31 August 2026, Drew was hospitalised.

Political offices
Preceded by Timothy Harris	Prime Minister of Saint Kitts and Nevis; 2022–present	Incumbent
