= Samal Duggins =

Saint Kitts and Nevis politician

Minister of Agriculture, Marine Resources, Fisheries and Cooperatives, Small Business and Entrepreneurship, Sports and the Creative Economy
- Incumbent
- Assumed office August 2022
- Monarchs: Elizabeth II; Charles III
- Prime Minister: Terrance Drew

Personal details
- Born: Samal Mojah Duggins; 13 November 1984 (age 41) Saint Kitts
- Party: Saint Kitts and Nevis Labour Party
- Education: University of the West Indies

Samal Mojah Duggins (born 13 November 1984) is a politician from Saint Kitts and Nevis who has served in the government of Terrance Drew since 2022.
