= Geoffrey Hanley =

Kittitian politician

The Honourable Geoffrey Hanley
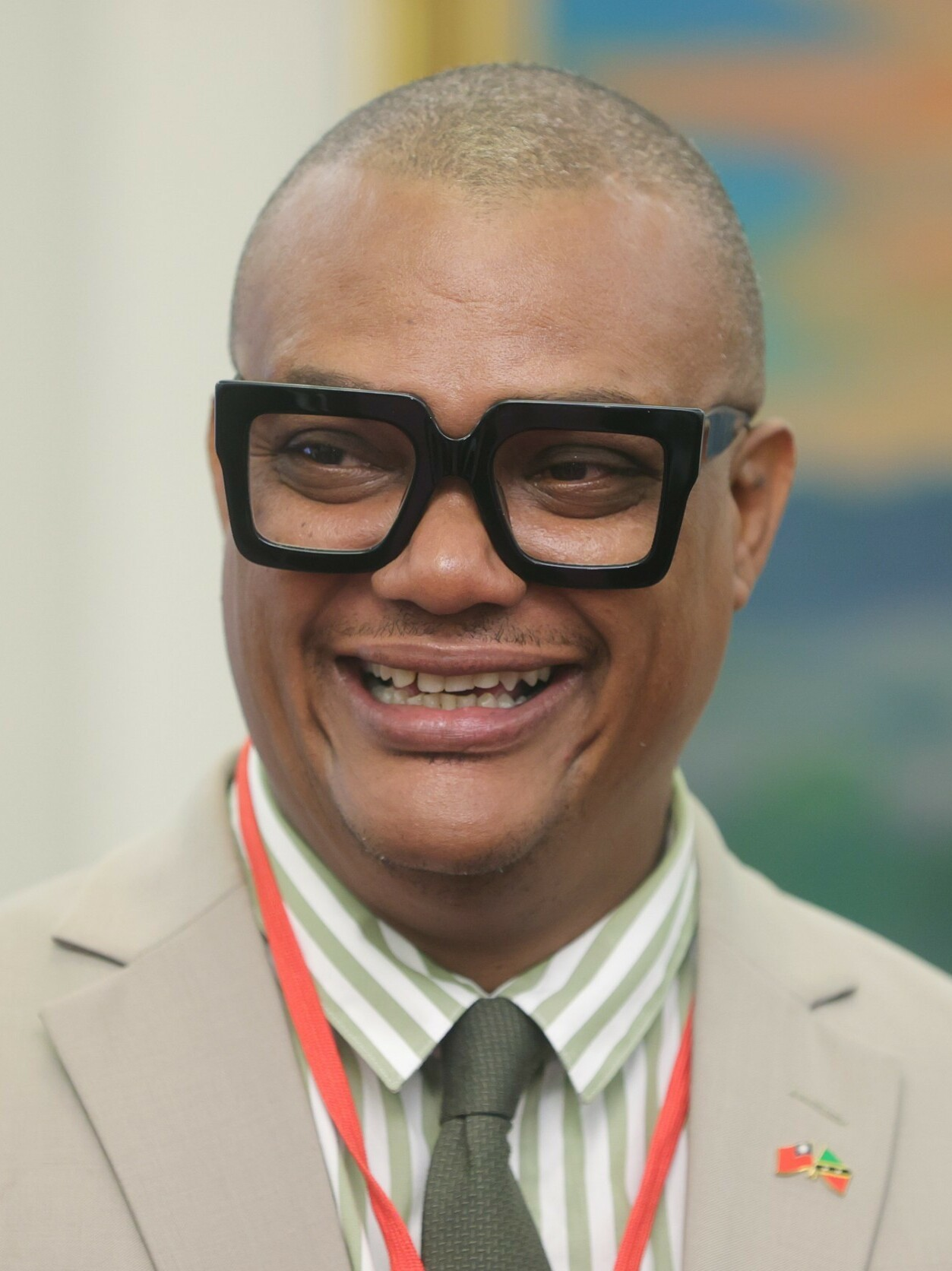
- Hanley in 2023

11th Deputy Prime Minister of Saint Kitts and Nevis
- Incumbent
- Assumed office 6 August 2022
- Prime Minister: Terrance Drew
- Preceded by: Eugene Hamilton

Personal details
- Born: 7 April 1972 (age 54) Newtown, Saint Kitts
- Party: Saint Kitts and Nevis Labour Party

Geoffrey Hanley (born on 7 April 1972) is a politician from Saint Kitts and Nevis.

Hanley was elected MP to the National Assembly in the 2020 general election. Previously he worked as a principal and as a director in the department of youth.

He ran for the leadership position of the Saint Kitts and Nevis Labour Party in November 2021, but lost to Terrance Drew. Hanley did get elected as deputy leader of the Labour party alongside Konris Maynard.

Following the Labour party victory in the August 2022 general election, Hanley was re-elected MP, and appointed as deputy prime minister and minister of education.
