= 1971 Saint Kitts-Nevis-Anguilla general election =

General elections were held in Saint Kitts-Nevis-Anguilla on 10 May 1971. The result was a victory for the Saint Kitts-Nevis-Anguilla Labour Party (SKNALP), which won seven of the nine elected seats. The SKNALP won all seven seats at the island of Saint Kitts, while the two seats at the island of Nevis were divided between the People's Action Movement and the Nevis Reformation Party. Anguilla, which was nominally entitled to one seat, boycotted the elections in the aftermath of the 1969 referendum. Voter turnout was 87.9%.

== Results ==
Party	Votes	%	Seats	+/–
Saint Kitts-Nevis-Anguilla Labour Party	7,416	50.84	7	0
People's Action Movement	5,397	37.00	1	–1
Nevis Reformation Party	1,127	7.73	1	New
United National Movement	647	4.44	0	–1
Appointed members			4	+1
Total	14,587	100.00	13	+3
Valid votes	14,587	96.52		
Invalid/blank votes	526	3.48		
Total votes	15,113	100.00		
Registered voters/turnout	17,202	87.86		
Source: Nohlen
