= Marsha Henderson =

Saint Kitts and Nevis politician

Marsha Tamika Henderson is a Saint Kitts and Nevis politician from the Saint Kitts and Nevis Labour Party.

== Political career ==
She is MP for St Christopher #2 and has been Minister of Tourism, Civil Aviation, and Urban Development in the Drew ministry since August 2022.
