= 1966 Saint Kitts-Nevis-Anguilla general election =

General elections were held in Saint Kitts-Nevis-Anguilla on 25 July 1966. The result was a victory for the Saint Kitts-Nevis-Anguilla Labour Party, which won seven of the ten seats. Voter turnout was 70%.

The elections were the first that the People's Action Movement (PAM) contested, having been founded in January 1965.

== Results ==
The elections saw large differences in support across the three islands; in St Kitts, Labour received 65% of the vote and won all seven seats; however they did not win any seats outside of St Kitts. In Anguilla the PAM received 54% of the vote and won its only seat, while they also dominated in Nevis, where they received 52% of the vote and won one of the island's two seats, with the Nevis-based United National Movement winning the second.

| Party | Votes | % | Seats | +/– |
|---|---|---|---|---|
| Saint Kitts-Nevis-Anguilla Labour Party | 6,249 | 44.30 | 7 | 0 |
| People's Action Movement | 4,936 | 34.99 | 2 | New |
| United National Movement | 834 | 5.91 | 1 | –1 |
| Independents | 2,086 | 14.79 | 0 | –1 |
| Appointed members | | | 3 | 0 |
| Total | 14,105 | 100.00 | 13 | 0 |
| Valid votes | 14,105 | 99.79 | | |
| Invalid/blank votes | 30 | 0.21 | | |
| Total votes | 14,135 | 100.00 | | |
| Registered voters/turnout | 20,121 | 70.25 | | |
Source: Nohlen
