= 2020 Saint Kitts and Nevis general election =

- 5 June 2020

11 of the 15 seats in the National Assembly 6 seats needed for a majority
- Registered: 48,713
- Turnout: 57.96% (▼14.23pp)
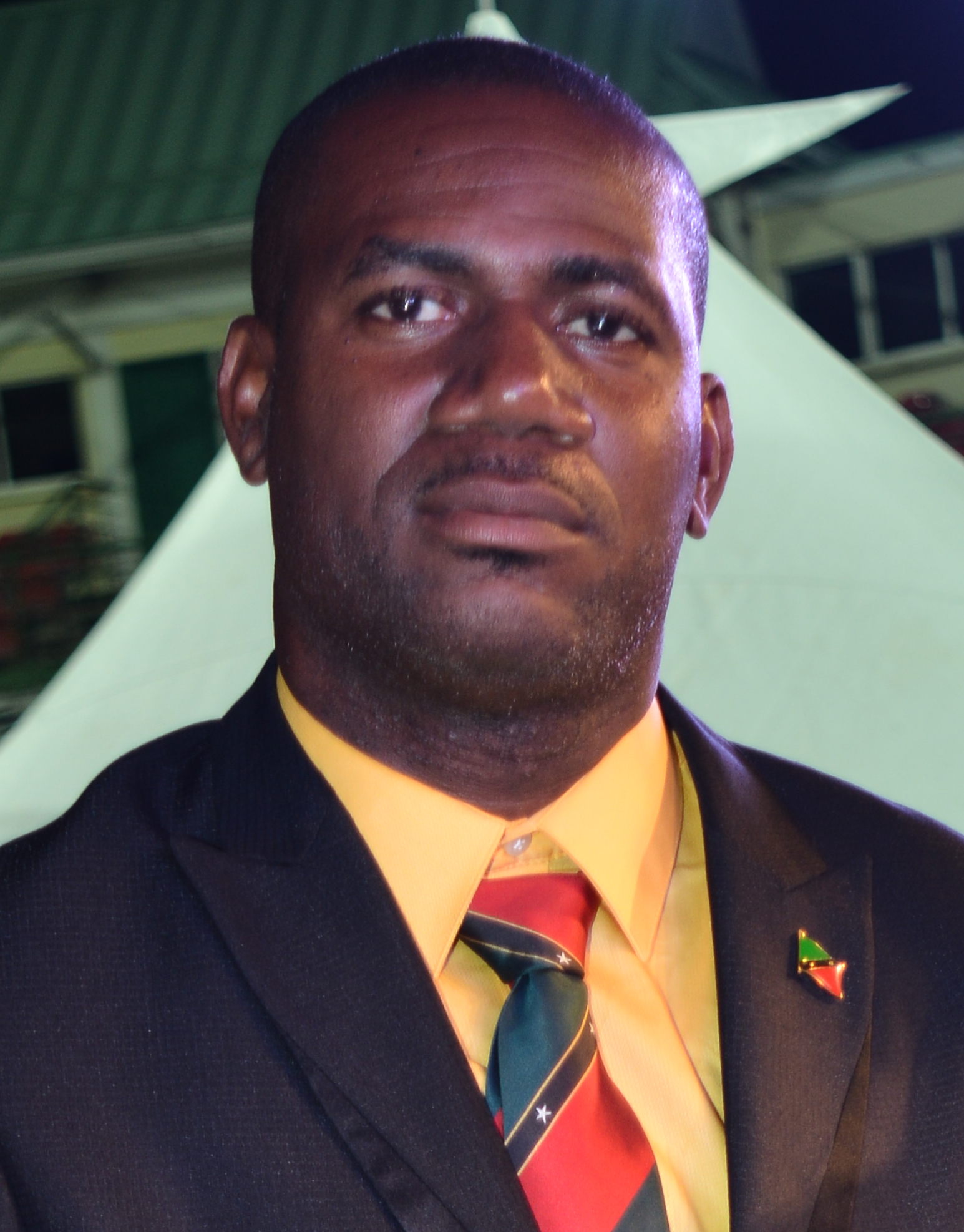

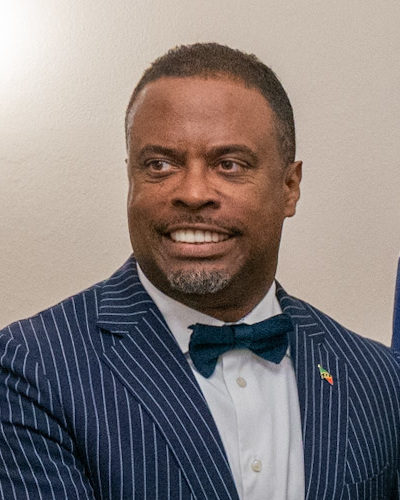

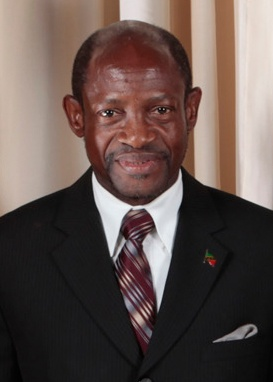

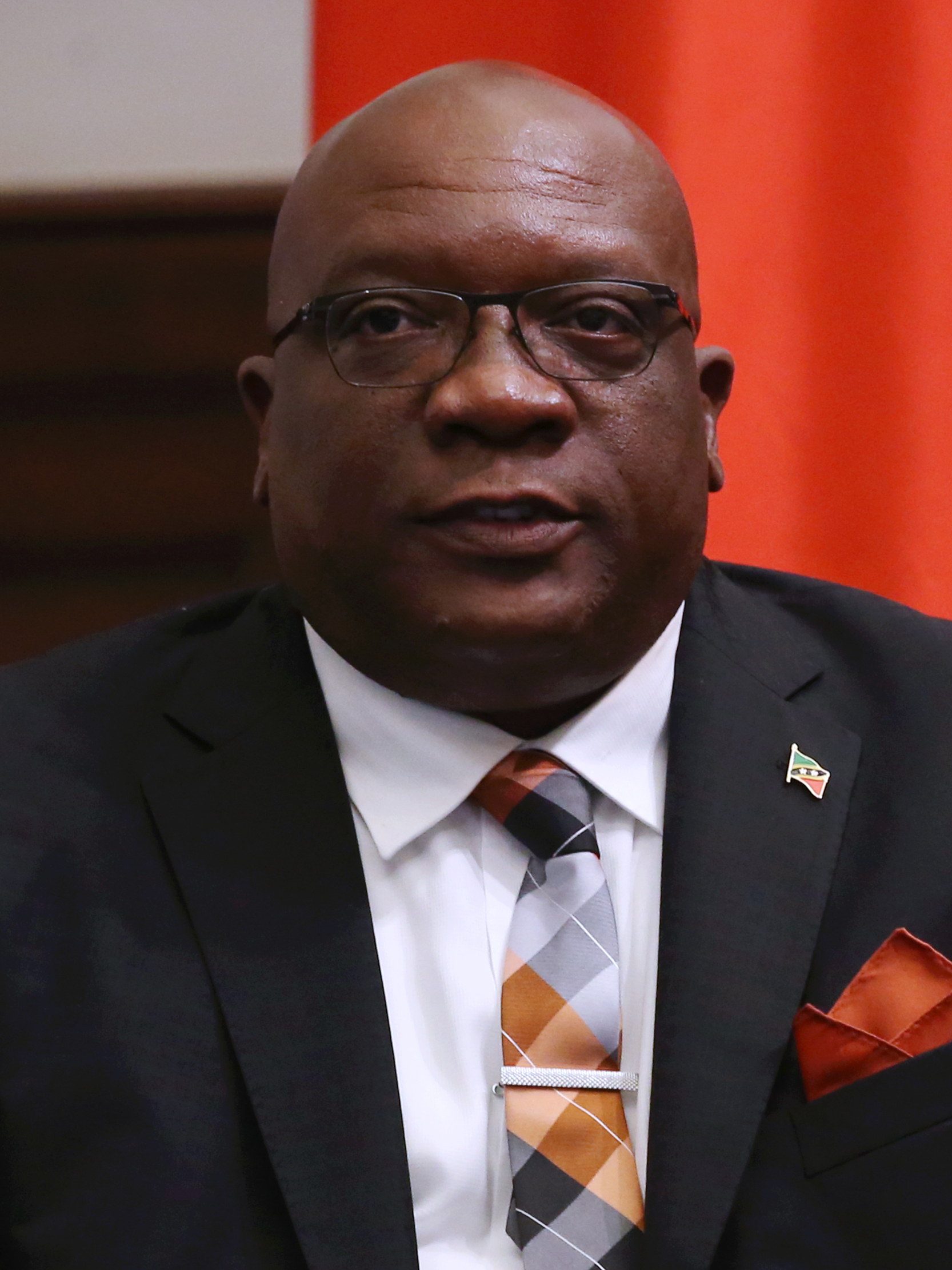
	First party	Second party
Leader	Shawn Richards	Mark Brantley
Party	PAM	CCM
Alliance	Team Unity	Team Unity
Leader since	2012	29 October 2017
Leader's seat	St Christopher #5	Nevis #9
Last election	27.90%, 4 seats	13.04%, 2 seats
Seats won	4	3
Seat change	Steady	▲1
Popular vote	8,100	3,510
Percentage	28.93%	12.54%
Swing	▲1.03pp	▼0.50pp
	Third party	Fourth party
Leader	Denzil Douglas	Timothy Harris
Party	SKNLP	PLP
Alliance	None	Team Unity
Leader since	1989	17 June 2013
Leader's seat	St Christopher #6	St Christopher #7
Last election	39.27%, 3 seats	8.99%, 1 seat
Seats won	2	2
Seat change	▼1	▲1
Popular vote	10,456	3,688
Percentage	37.35%	13.17%
Swing	▼1.92pp	▲4.18pp
- Results by constituency
Prime Minister before election
Timothy Harris
PLP
Elected Prime Minister
Timothy Harris
PLP

General elections were held in Saint Kitts and Nevis on Friday 5 June 2020.

The ruling Team Unity coalition consisting of the People's Action Movement, Concerned Citizens' Movement and People's Labour Party won a landslide victory with nine of the eleven directly elected seats with a combined 55% of the vote. As had happened in the previous elections in 2015, the Saint Kitts and Nevis Labour Party received the most votes but did not win the most seats. The Nevis Reformation Party lost their only seat in Nevis, the first time in the party's history that they had failed to secure representation in the National Assembly in a general election.

== Electoral system ==
Eleven of the fifteen seats in the National Assembly are elected, with three other members appointed by the Governor-General at some point after the elections and one seat held by the Attorney-General. The eleven elected seats are elected in single-member constituencies using plurality voting.

== Results ==
Party	Votes	%	Seats	+/–
Saint Kitts and Nevis Labour Party	10,456	37.35	2	–1
People's Action Movement	8,100	28.93	4	0
People's Labour Party	3,688	13.17	2	+1
Concerned Citizens' Movement	3,510	12.54	3	+1
Nevis Reformation Party	2,232	7.97	0	–1
Independents	11	0.04	0	0
Appointed members			4	0
Total	27,997	100.00	15	0
Valid votes	27,997	99.16		
Invalid/blank votes	238	0.84		
Total votes	28,235	100.00		
Registered voters/turnout	48,713	57.96		
Source: Ministry of Justice and Legal Affairs

=== Elected MPs ===
Constituency	MPs	Party
St Christopher #1	Geoffrey Hanley	Saint Kitts and Nevis Labour Party
St Christopher #2	Jonel Powell	People's Action Movement
St Christopher #3	Akilah Byron-Nisbett	People's Labour Party
St Christopher #4	Lindsay Grant	People's Action Movement
St Christopher #5	Shawn Richards	People's Action Movement
St Christopher #6	Denzil Douglas	Saint Kitts and Nevis Labour Party
St Christopher #7	Timothy Harris	People's Labour Party
St Christopher #8	Eugene Hamilton	People's Action Movement
Nevis #9	Mark Brantley	Concerned Citizens' Movement
Nevis #10	Eric Evelyn	Concerned Citizens' Movement
Nevis #11	Alexis Jeffers	Concerned Citizens' Movement
Source: Ministry of Justice and Legal Affairs
