= Team Unity =

- Leader: Timothy Harris (PLP)
- Deputy leader: Shawn Richards (PAM); Mark Brantley (CCM)
- Founded: 2013
- Dissolved: 2022
- Succeeded by: One Movement
- Headquarters: Basseterre, Saint Kitts and Nevis
- Membership: 3 parties
- Slogan: "Better Together"
- National Assembly seats: 9 / 11 (prior to dissolution in 2022)
- Nevis Island Assembly seats: 4 / 5 (prior to dissolution in 2022)

Team Unity was a political alliance and government coalition of three political parties in Saint Kitts and Nevis. It formed the government after winning the 2015 and 2020 elections. In 2022, major disagreements by CCM and PAM's leaders, Mark Brantley and Shawn Richards, with Prime Minister and PLP leader Timothy Harris, resulted in the Team Unity government collapsing and Harris calling a snap election.

== History ==
Team Unity was created in September 2013 by three opposition political parties in Saint Kitts and Nevis: the newly founded People's Labour Party (PLP), a party founded by MPs who had split from the ruling Saint Kitts and Nevis Labour Party; the People's Action Movement (PAM); and the Nevis-based Concerned Citizens' Movement (CCM). PLP leader Timothy Harris was announced as leader of the alliance, with PAM leader Shawn Richards and senior CCM politician Mark Brantley becoming its deputy leaders. Harris stated that Team Unity was established for the purpose of ousting the Labour government under Denzil Douglas in an election and forming a government.

At the 2015 general election, the three parties ran on a joint platform and did not stand candidates against each other, with PAM and PLP standing in six and two seats respectively in Saint Kitts, and the CCM contesting all three in Nevis. The election saw the Team Unity alliance win seven out of eleven constituencies and a combined 49.9% of the vote, defeating Labour. Shortly after the election, Team Unity officially formed the government, with PLP leader Timothy Harris becoming Prime Minister, and various cabinet positions going to Team Unity MPs, including PAM leader Shawn Richards as Deputy Prime Minister and CCM's Mark Brantley as foreign minister.

At the 2020 general election, Team Unity further increased its representation to nine out of eleven seats and won a combined 55% of the vote. Harris again served as Prime Minister and Team Unity parties were assigned various cabinet roles once again.

In March and April 2022, various disagreements between Richards and Brantley with Harris culminated in an attempted vote of no confidence in Harris as Prime Minister. In early May, this request for a no confidence vote was denied by the Governor-General and Harris subsequently sacked six cabinet ministers, including Richards and Brantley, and dissolved parliament and called a snap election. In the 2022 Saint Kitts and Nevis snap election, the PLP ran candidates against PAM. However, PAM and CCM maintained a close partnership and formed a new alliance called One Movement, and released a joint manifesto.

The election saw all of the parties that had previously formed Team Unity lose the election, with Labour winning a majority and forming government.

== Member parties ==
Below is a table of Team Unity's members and their representation just before the dissolution of the alliance:

Party	Abbr.	National Assembly MPs (2020-2022)	Nevis Island Assembly MPs (2017-2022)
People's Action Movement	PAM	4 / 11	N/A
Concerned Citizens' Movement	CCM	3 / 11	4 / 5
People's Labour Party	PLP	2 / 11	N/A

The alliance between the parties meant that they did not stand candidates against each other in general elections. The CCM only contest elections in Nevis anyway, with the other two parties therefore only contesting the St. Kitts constituencies.

== Election results ==
=== National Assembly ===
Election year	# of votes	% of vote	# of overall seats won	+/–	Govt?
2015	15,126	49.9	7 / 11	▲3	Government
2020	15,298	54.6	9 / 11	▲2	Government
