= 2015 Saint Kitts and Nevis general election =

- 16 February 2015

11 of 15 seats to the National Assembly 6 seats needed for a majority
- Registered: 42,185
- Turnout: 72.19% (▼7.62pp)
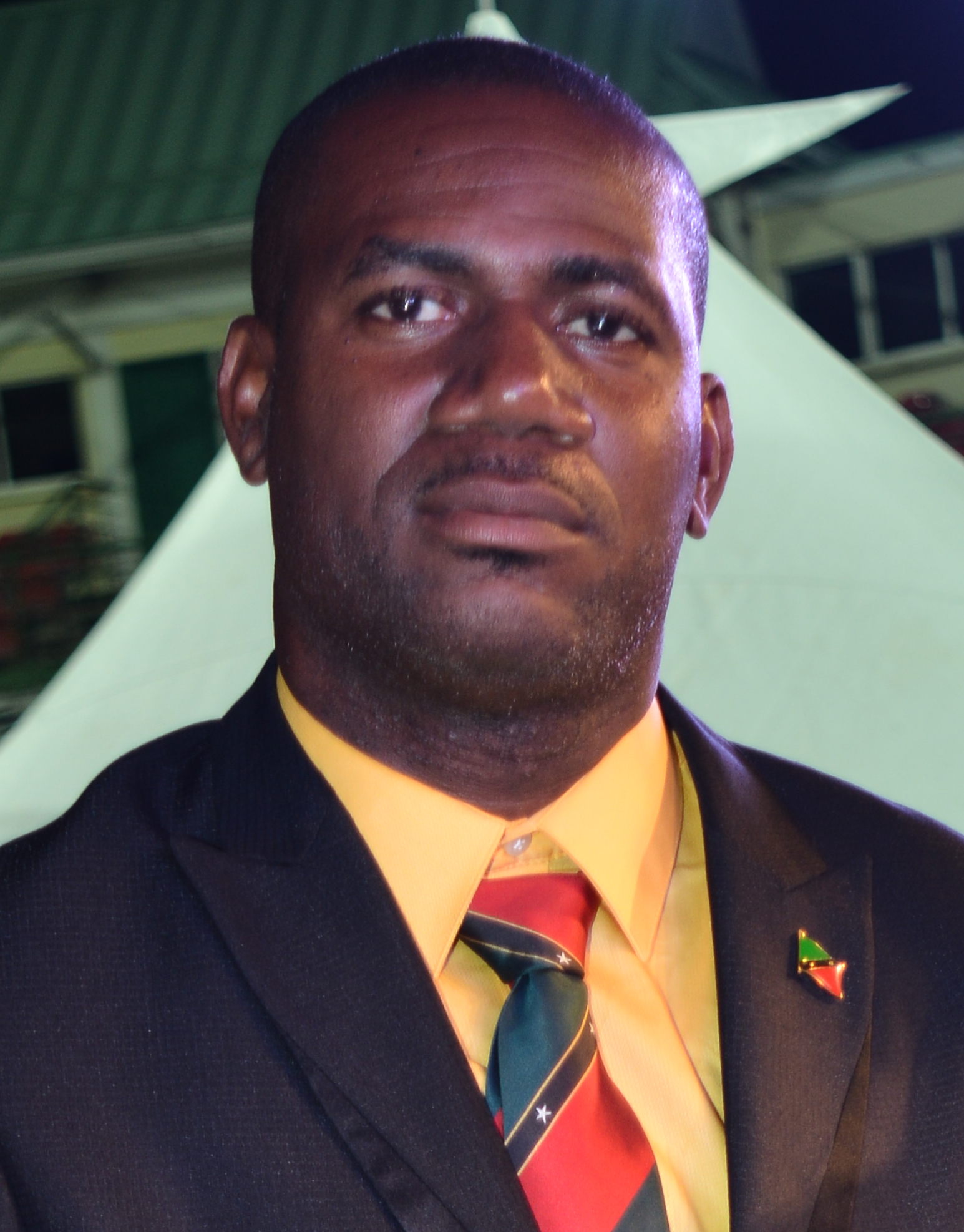

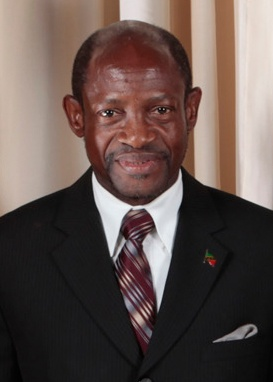

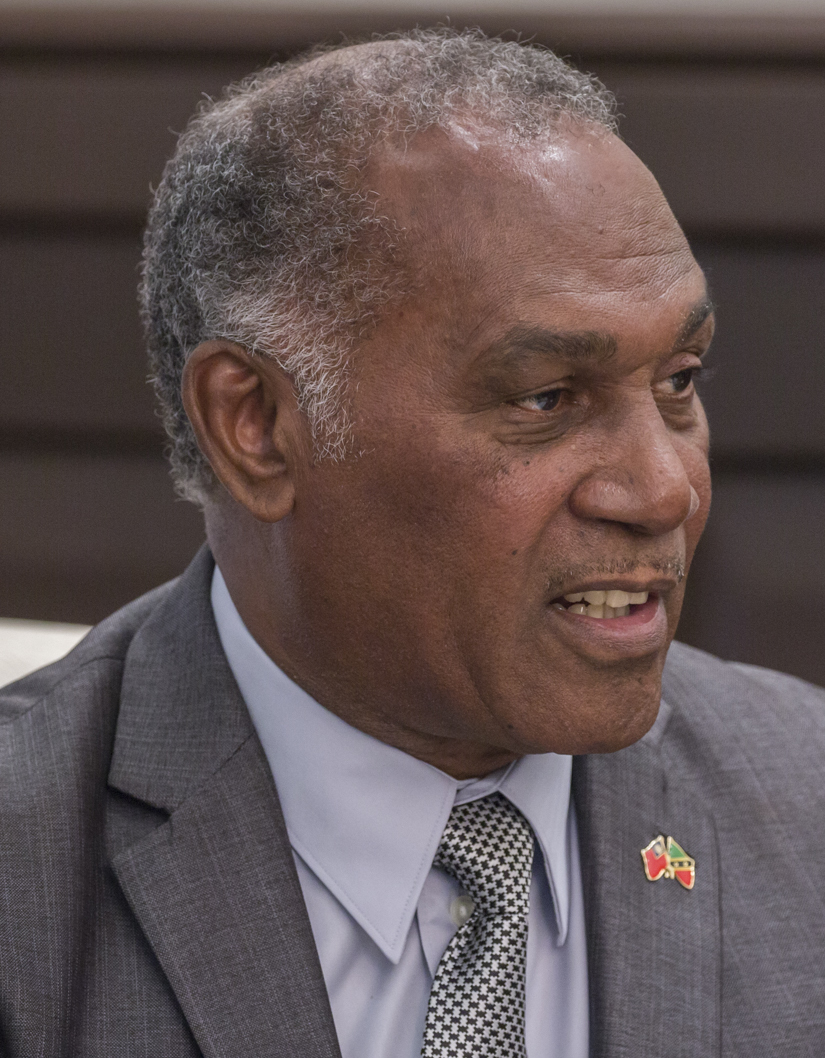

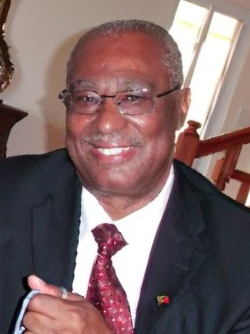

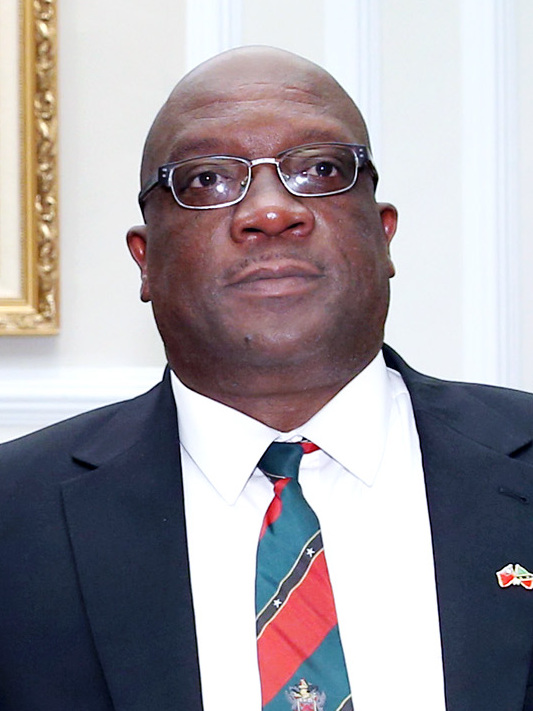
	First party	Second party	Third party
Leader	Shawn Richards	Denzil Douglas	Vance Amory
Party	PAM	SKNLP	CCM
Alliance	Team Unity	None	Team Unity
Leader's seat	St Christopher #5	St Christopher #6	Nevis #10
Last election	32.24%, 2 seats	46.96%, 6 seats	10.99%, 2 seats
Seats won	4	3	2
Seat change	▲2	▼3	Steady
Popular vote	8,452	11,897	3,951
Percentage	27.90%	39.27%	13.04%
Swing	▼4.34pp	▼7.69pp	▲2.05pp
	Fourth party	Fifth party
Leader	Joseph Parry	Timothy Harris
Party	NRP	PLP
Alliance	None	Team Unity
Leader's seat	Did not run	St Christopher #7
Last election	9.75%, 1 seat	–
Seats won	1	1
Seat change	Steady	New
Popular vote	3,276	2,723
Percentage	10.81%	9.0%
Swing	▲1.06pp	New
- Results by constituency
Prime Minister before election
Denzil Douglas
SKNLP
Elected Prime Minister
Timothy Harris
PLP

General elections were held in Saint Kitts and Nevis on 16 February 2015. The ruling Saint Kitts and Nevis Labour Party, led by Prime Minister Denzil Douglas, was defeated by Team Unity, an alliance of the Concerned Citizens' Movement, the People's Action Movement, and the People's Labour Party, led by Timothy Harris.

== Campaign ==
Prior to the elections, three opposition parties, the People's Action Movement, the People's Labour Party and the Concerned Citizens' Movement formed the Team Unity alliance. The three parties did not field candidates against each other, and formed the sole opposition to the Saint Kitts and Nevis Labour Party on Saint Kitts and to the Nevis Reformation Party on Nevis. The National Integrity Party, a party founded by former PAM members in 2013, announced on nomination day that they would not be contesting the election.

== Electoral system ==
Eleven of the fifteen seats in the National Assembly were elected, with three other members appointed by the Governor-General at some point after the elections and one seat held by the Attorney-General. The eleven elected seats were elected in single-member constituencies using plurality voting.

== Results ==
On Saint Kitts, the People's Action Movement won four of the eight seats, whilst the Saint Kitts and Nevis Labour Party lost half their seats. Contesting their first elections, the People's Labour Party won one seat. On Nevis, two seats were won by the Concerned Citizens' Movement and the third by the Nevis Reformation Party.

The outgoing coalition (SKNLP and NRP) secured 50.08% of votes but got only 4 seats due to the single-member plurality electoral system. This was also the first election in the country where the individual party that won the most votes did not win the most seats.

Party	Votes	%	Seats	+/–
Saint Kitts and Nevis Labour Party	11,897	39.27	3	–3
People's Action Movement	8,452	27.90	4	+2
Concerned Citizens' Movement	3,951	13.04	2	0
Nevis Reformation Party	3,276	10.81	1	0
People's Labour Party	2,723	8.99	1	New
Appointed members			4	0
Total	30,299	100.00	15	0
Valid votes	30,299	99.49		
Invalid/blank votes	156	0.51		
Total votes	30,455	100.00		
Registered voters/turnout	42,185	72.19		
Source: SKN Vibes

=== Elected MPs ===
MPs	Party	Constituency
Ian Liburd	People's Action Movement	St Christopher #1
Marcella Liburd	Saint Kitts and Nevis Labour Party	St Christopher #2
Konris Maynard	Saint Kitts and Nevis Labour Party	St Christopher #3
Lindsay Grant	People's Action Movement	St Christopher #4
Shawn Richards	People's Action Movement	St Christopher #5
Denzil Douglas	Saint Kitts and Nevis Labour Party	St Christopher #6
Timothy Harris	People's Labour Party	St Christopher #7
Eugene Hamilton	People's Action Movement	St Christopher #8
Mark Brantley	Concerned Citizens' Movement	Nevis #9
Vance Amory	Concerned Citizens' Movement	Nevis #10
Patrice Nisbett	Nevis Reformation Party	Nevis #11
