= Denzil Douglas =

Prime Minister of Saint Kitts and Nevis from 1995 to 2015

The Right Honourable Denzil Douglas
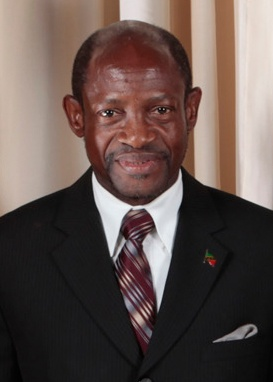
- Douglas in 2009

2nd Prime Minister of Saint Kitts and Nevis
- In office 6 July 1995 – 18 February 2015
- Monarch: Elizabeth II
- Governors-General: Clement Arrindell; Cuthbert Sebastian; Edmund Lawrence
- Deputy: Sam Condor (1995–2013); Earl Asim Martin (2013–2015)
- Preceded by: Kennedy Simmonds
- Succeeded by: Timothy Harris

Minister of Foreign Affairs
- Incumbent
- Assumed office 15 August 2022
- Prime Minister: Terrance Drew
- Preceded by: Vincent Byron
- In office 25 January 2008 – 2010
- Prime Minister: Himself
- Preceded by: Timothy Harris
- Succeeded by: Sam Condor
- In office 6 July 1995 – 2000
- Prime Minister: Himself
- Preceded by: Kennedy Simmonds
- Succeeded by: Sam Condor

Minister of Finance
- In office July 1995 – November 2008
- Preceded by: Kennedy Simmonds
- Succeeded by: Timothy Harris
- In office February 2010 – February 2015
- Preceded by: Timothy Harris
- Succeeded by: Timothy Harris

Personal details
- Born: Denzil Llewellyn Douglas; 14 January 1953 (age 73) Saint Paul Capisterre, British Leeward Islands (now Saint Kitts and Nevis)
- Party: Saint Kitts and Nevis Labour Party
- Education: University of the West Indies at Cave Hill

The Right Hon. Denzil Llewellyn Douglas (born 14 January 1953) is a Saint Kittitian and Nevisian politician and the longest-serving prime minister of Saint Kitts and Nevis, in office from 1995 to 2015. He was the leader of the Saint Kitts and Nevis Labour Party (SKNLP) from 1989 to 2021. He was the leader of the parliamentary opposition from 1989 to 1995 and from 2015 to 2022. A medical doctor by training, he has been the Minister of Foreign Affairs, International Trade, Industry, Commerce, and Consumer Affairs since 15 August 2022.

== Biography ==
=== Early life and pre-political career ===
Born on 14 January 1953 in the village of St. Pauls, Douglas studied medicine as a young man. He obtained a Bachelor of Science degree in 1977 and a Degree in Medicine in 1984 from the University of the West Indies at Cave Hill. In 1986 he established a private medical practice as a family physician and served as President of the St. Kitts-Nevis Medical Association in the late 1980s.

=== Political life ===
Douglas was elected M.P. for St. Christopher (No.6) ward (Newton Ground, St. Paul's, Dieppe Bay, Saddlers, and Harris) in the National Assembly of Saint Kitts and Nevis in 1989 and appointed leader of the opposition. That year he was also elected leader of the Saint Kitts and Nevis Labour Party after some internal wrangling for the leadership between himself and the then incumbent political leader Sir Lee L Moore. This internal feud surfaced after Sir Lee L Moore had lost his seat in constituency number 4.

He restructured the party in preparation for its 1995 electoral victory. He was appointed Prime Minister of Saint Kitts and Nevis in 1995, re-appointed Prime Minister in March 2000 and again in October 2004 after the Labour Party won a third term with seven of the eight seats on St. Kitts. The Labour Party won its fourth consecutive term in office on 25 January 2010, winning six of the eight seats on St Kitts in the eleven-member National Assembly.

In 2011, Douglas was responsible for the OLPC (One Laptop per Child) program, which provided 2,000 free laptops per year from Taiwan to high school students.

After the 2015 election, Douglas became the Leader of the Opposition, continuing to play a central role in national politics. He remained the political leader of the St. Kitts-Nevis Labour Party (SKNLP) and was re‑elected multiple times as the parliamentary representative for Constituency #6, maintaining strong grassroots support.

Following the 2022 general election, Douglas returned to the government and was appointed as Minister of Foreign Affairs, International Trade, Industry, Commerce, and Consumer Affairs. He also represents the St. Kitts and Nevis in CARICOM (The Caribbean Community forum headquartered in Georgetown, Guyana).

=== Legacy and Impact ===
Douglas is credited with modernizing the economy, improving healthcare and education, and promoting tourism and foreign investment.

=== Political Controversies ===
In 2014, the Financial Crimes Enforcement Network (FinCEN) issued an Advisory to alert financial institutions that certain foreign individuals were abusing the Citizenship by Investment program sponsored by the Federation of St. Kitts and Nevis (SKN) led by the Denzil Douglas Administration to obtain SKN passports for the purpose of engaging in illicit financial activity. As a result of these lax controls, illicit actors, including individuals intending to use the secondary citizenship to evade sanctions, can obtain an SKN passport with relative ease. These events led to the United States revoking his visa. Douglas has categorically denied the allegations, calling the document "purported" and widely circulated without verification.

=== Detainment at Gatwick Airport London ===
On 16 November 2019, The Mail on Sunday reported Douglas was detained at Gatwick Airport by the UK's Border Force. The Officers seized the equivalent of more than £70,000 – in sterling, US dollars and eastern Caribbean dollars – from him when he could not explain why he was attempting to leave the country with the cash. It was said he was the subject of a probe by the National Crime Agency.

Douglas dismissed the allegations, calling them a political tactic by the Harris administration. Although he was allowed to continue his trip to Dubai, court records show the seized funds remain with UK authorities while their investigation continues. He also denied reports that he was arrested, contradicting a Mail on Sunday story, and said the matter is being handled by his lawyers. Douglas described the publication as a malicious effort pushed by a social‑media outlet aligned with the coalition government.

=== Appeal court ruled that Denzil Douglas must vacate seat in Parliament ===
On Thursday 12 March 2020, the Government of St Kitts-Nevis Information Services SKNIS reported in a Press release that The Eastern Caribbean Supreme Court (ECSC) of Appeal in Castries, Saint Lucia, in a judgment handed down on, March 12, 2020, ruled that Douglas must vacate his seat in the National Assembly with immediate effect over the issue of a Dominican diplomatic passport that had been granted to him by Dominica. Chief Justice Janice M. Pereira made the following conclusion:

"The cumulative effect of my conclusions is that Dr. Douglas, by his application for, receipt and use of a Dominican diplomatic passport, placed him in clear breach of section 28(1)(a) of the Constitution. As a matter of law, the consequence in the terms of section 33(3)(c) follows. That consequence is that, Dr. Douglas is required to vacate his seat in the National Assembly in Saint Christopher and Nevis,"

=== Post-premiership ===
After losing the 2015 general election he remained active in politics as leader of the opposition. Prior to the 2020 general election, Douglas had not put in place a succession plan for new leadership of the SKNLP despite calls to resign.

In 2021, Douglas decided to step down as leader of the SKNLP, while remaining the parliamentary leader of the opposition. At the national SKNLP convention on 28 November 2021, party chairman Terrance Drew was elected as his successor.

On 15 August 2022, Douglas joined the Drew ministry as Minister of Foreign Affairs.

== Honours ==
- United Kingdom
  - Appointed to Her Majesty’s Privy Council, with the prefix "Right Honourable" added to his name (2011)
- Taiwan:
  - Special Grand Cordon of the Order of Propitious Clouds (2011)

Political offices
Preceded by Kennedy Simmonds	Prime Minister of Saint Kitts and Nevis; 1995–2015	Succeeded by Timothy Harris
