= Timothy Harris =

Former Prime Minister of Saint Kitts and Nevis

The Honourable Timothy Harris
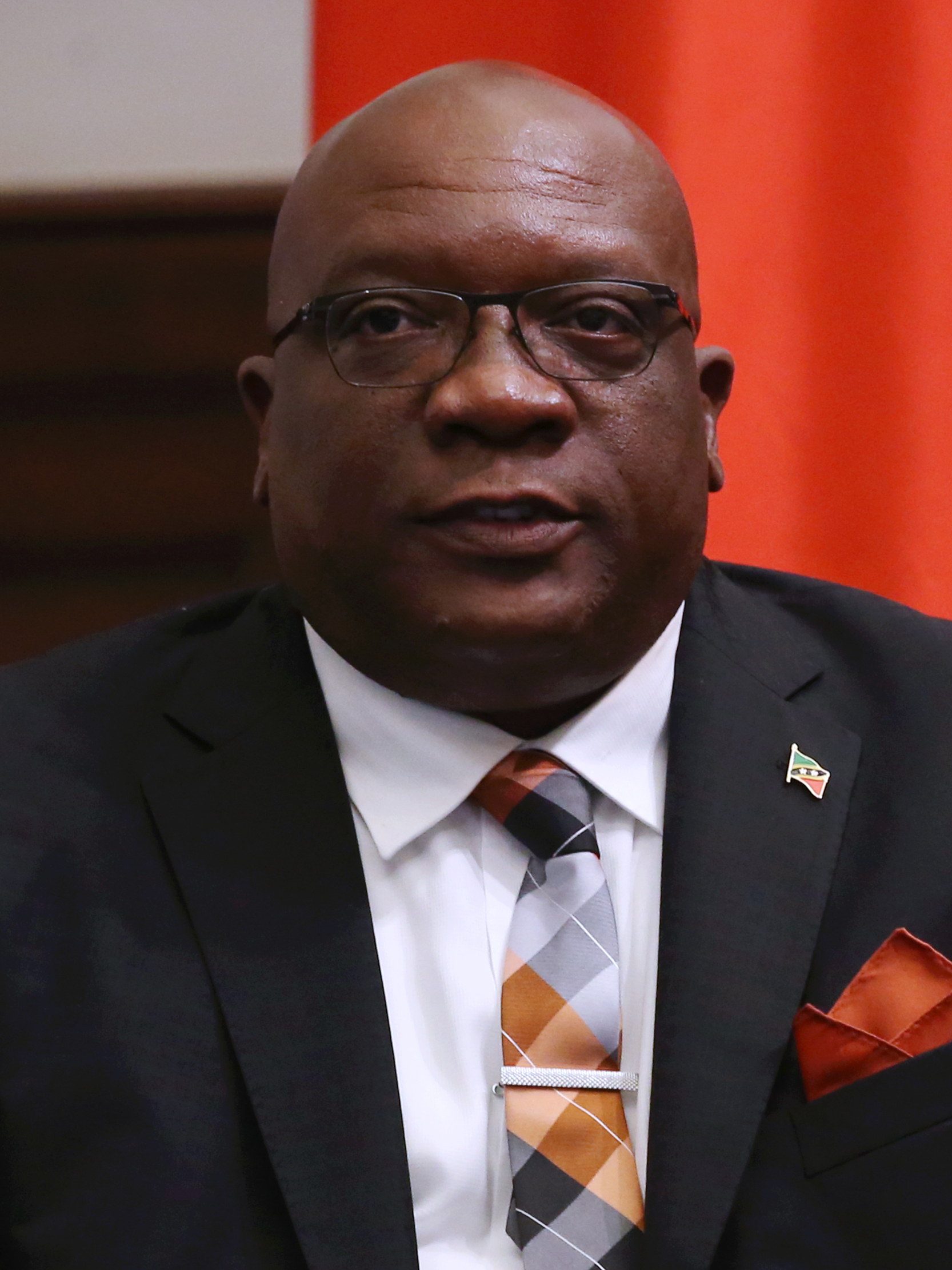
- Harris in 2019

3rd Prime Minister of Saint Kitts and Nevis
- In office 18 February 2015 – 6 August 2022
- Monarch: Elizabeth II
- Governors-General: Edmund Lawrence; Tapley Seaton
- Deputy: Shawn Richards (2015–2022); Eugene Hamilton (2022)
- Preceded by: Denzil Douglas
- Succeeded by: Terrance Drew

Minister of Finance
- In office November 2008 – February 2010
- Prime Minister: Denzil Douglas
- Preceded by: Denzil Douglas
- Succeeded by: Denzil Douglas
- In office February 2015 – August 2022
- Preceded by: Denzil Douglas
- Succeeded by: Terrance Drew

Minister of Foreign Affairs
- In office 10 August 2001 – 25 January 2008
- Prime Minister: Denzil Douglas
- Preceded by: Sam Condor
- Succeeded by: Denzil Douglas

Member of Parliament
- Incumbent
- Assumed office 1995
- Constituency: Saint Christopher #7

Personal details
- Born: Timothy Sylvester Harris; 6 December 1964 (age 61) Tabernacle, Saint Christopher-Nevis-Anguilla
- Party: Labour Party (Before 2013); People's Labour Party (2013–present)
- Other political affiliations: Team Unity (2013–2022)
- Education: University of the West Indies at Cave Hill (BSc); University of the West Indies at St. Augustine (MSc); McGill University (PhD); Concordia University (PhD); University of Quebec at Montreal (PhD); University of Montreal (PhD)

Timothy Sylvester Harris (born 6 December 1964) is a Kittitian politician who served as the third prime minister of Saint Kitts and Nevis from 2015 to 2022. He previously served as Minister of Foreign Affairs from 10 August 2001 to 25 January 2008, as Minister of Finance from 2008 to 2010, and as Senior Minister and Minister for Agriculture from 2010 to 2013. Originally affiliated with the Labour Party, he founded and has served as leader of the People's Labour Party since 2013.

== Early life and education ==
Harris grew up in the village of Tabernacle, Saint Kitts. He attended the Cayon High School and Basseterre High School before going to six university campuses, two in the Caribbean and four in Canada. In 1988, Harris graduated from the University of the West Indies at Cave Hill with a B.Sc. degree with a First Class Honours in Accounting, the only graduate of the B.Sc. Accounting programme to obtain this distinction. He also received the Victor Crooke Prize for Best Accounting Student. He returned home and worked for two years at managerial level with S. L. Horsfords and Co Ltd.

In 1990–92 he pursued his M.Sc. degree in accounting at the University of the West Indies at St. Augustine in Trinidad and Tobago. He graduated top of the class with an M.Sc. degree with a Distinction.

In 2001 Harris successfully defended his Ph.D. dissertation at Concordia University in Montreal, Canada. The doctoral programme is a joint Ph.D. programme involving Concordia University, McGill and two francophone universities: H.E.C. (affiliated to Université de Montréal) and UQAM. Harris holds a Doctor of Philosophy degree in administration majoring in accounting.

== Political career ==
Harris first participated in elected politics in 1993 when he was elected as a Member of Parliament on the St. Kitts-Nevis Labour Party ticket for the St Christopher #7 constituency. He was re-elected as a Labour MP in the 1995, 2000, 2004, and 2010 elections. He held various cabinet posts, including Minister of Agriculture, Lands and Housing, Minister of Education, Labour and Social Security, Minister of Foreign Affairs and Education and Minister of Foreign Affairs, International Trade, Industry and Commerce. He has published several works and received several awards, including the St. Kitts Youth Council Award for Excellence in Education, the FESTAB Community Award for outstanding contribution to FESTAB and a certificate for outstanding contribution to the Cayon High School.

In 2013, Prime Minister Denzil Douglas fired Harris from the cabinet. Harris established the People's Labour Party (PLP) later in the year. In September 2013, the PLP also formed the Team Unity alliance with the People's Action Movement and the Concerned Citizens' Movement, with Harris being named the leader of the alliance. At the 2015 general election, Team Unity's member parties did not run against each other and closely co-operated with one another. This resulted in the Team Unity alliance successfully winning a majority, with seven out of eleven available constituencies. Although Harris was the only PLP candidate elected meaning the PLP had just one MP, he became the third Prime Minister of independent St. Kitts and Nevis on 16 February 2015, succeeding Labour incumbent Denzil Douglas, who had served a historic near 20-year tenure.

Harris again lead the Team Unity alliance into the 2020 general election, with the PLP gaining a seat and Team Unity winning an increased number of seats, with nine of eleven MPs. He was re-elected as an MP and remained as Prime Minister, with Team Unity once again forming government. In 2022, disagreements between the CCM and PAM party leaders with Harris resulted in him dissolving parliament and firing six cabinet members, with a snap election being called. At the 2022 snap general election, Team Unity was dissolved and Harris led the PLP as a standalone party for the first time, with the party fielding candidates across all of the Saint Kitts constituencies. Harris was re-elected as an MP, but Labour won a majority, meaning Harris was returned to the opposition.

== Honours ==
- Taiwan:
  - Special Grand Cordon of the Order of Propitious Clouds (2019)

Political offices
Preceded by Sam Condor	Minister of Foreign Affairs; 2001–2008	Succeeded by Denzil Douglas
Preceded by Denzil Douglas	Prime Minister of Saint Kitts and Nevis; 2015–2022	Succeeded by Terrance Drew
Party political offices
New political party	Leader of the People's Labour Party; 2013–present	Incumbent
