= People's Action Movement =

- Abbreviation: PAM
- Leader: Shawn Richards
- Chairperson: Sheldon Pemberton
- Founder: William Valentine Herbert
- Founded: 19 January 1965
- Ideology: Conservatism; Republicanism
- Political position: Centre-right
- National affiliation: One Movement (since 2022); Team Unity (2013–2022)
- Regional affiliation: Caribbean Democrat Union
- National Assembly: 1 / 11

Website
- https://pamskn.org/

The People's Action Movement (PAM) is a political party in the island country of Saint Kitts and Nevis. The party currently holds one of the 11 seats in the National Assembly. PAM operates only in Saint Kitts, and for the 2022 general election is in a 'One Movement' alliance with the Concerned Citizens' Movement (CCM) operating in Nevis, following the breakdown of the governing Team Unity alliance. PAM is a member of the Caribbean Democrat Union, the regional affiliate of the International Democrat Union and shares close links with other centre-right party members in the Caribbean such as the Jamaica Labour Party.

== History ==
The party first contested national elections for the tri-partite colony of Saint Kitts-Nevis-Anguilla in 1966, when they received 35% of the vote and won two seats. Their support largely came from Anguilla and Nevis, where they picked up 53.5% and 51.9% of the vote respectively, and one MP from each island. In the 1967 local election in Nevis, the PAM won a majority on the Nevis Local Council, winning five of six seats.

PAM saw their national representation reduced to a single seat in the 1971 elections, despite a modest increase in overall vote share, and an increase on the island of St Kitts from 27% to 36% of the vote. PAM held on to their seat in Nevis, but were affected by Anguilla having seceded from the tri-partite associated state (where PAM had previously won a seat).

In the 1975 election, they lost all representation, failing to win any representation on St Kitts and not standing candidates in Nevis for the first time. PAM continues to only contest elections in St Kitts.

In the 1980 elections they won three seats, and were able to form a coalition government with the Nevis Reformation Party to oust the Saint Kitts and Nevis Labour Party (SKNLP) from power for the first time since 1952. PAM leader Kennedy Simmonds led the country to independence in 1983, and the party won six of the eleven seats in the 1984 elections to remain in power. Constance V. Mitcham, the first women to sit in the national assembly, was elected as a PAM candidate in 1984 and served until 1995.

They again won six seats in 1989. The 1993 elections saw PAM and the SKNLP win four seats each. The PAM remained in power, but early elections were held in 1995, which saw the PAM reduced to just one seat (with Simmonds losing his). They lost their only seat in the 2000 elections, but regained it in 2004, with constituency #5 being won by PAM's Shawn Richards. In the 2010 elections, the PAM won two seats, with Richards being re-elected and Eugene Hamilton gaining constituency #8.

Lindsay Grant served as leader of the PAM until his resignation in July 2012. After Grant's resignation, Shawn Richards and Eugene Hamilton contested for the party leadership in 2012, with Richards winning the contest and becoming the party's leader.

In 2024, Natasha Grey-Brookes was elected party leader, becoming the first woman to lead PAM and the first woman to lead a political party in St Kitts. In July 2026, she resigned as leader of PAM. In September 2026, Shawn Richards returned as PAM's leader after he won the leadership contest with 72 of 83 votes from a special caucus held by the party.

== Team Unity ==
Prior to the 2015 general elections, the People's Action Movement formed a political alliance, known as Team Unity, with the Nevis-based Concerned Citizens' Movement (CCM) and the newly formed People's Labour Party, which was led by former SKNLP members Timothy Harris and Sam Condor. The alliance won the 2015 and 2020 general elections, with PAM forming government with the other Team Unity members. This resulted in a number of PAM MPs serving in the Cabinet from 2015 to 2022, including party leader Shawn Richards serving as Deputy Prime Minister.

Team Unity ended in 2022, with PAM later forming an alliance with CCM called One Movement for the 2022 snap election. In this election, the party was reduced to just one seat and returned to the opposition, with the SKNLP winning a majority and forming the government.

== Leadership ==
- William Valentine Herbert, 1965-1975
- Kennedy Simmonds, 1975-2000
- Lindsay Grant, 2000-2012
- Shawn Richards, 2012-2024
- Natasha Grey-Brookes, 2024-2026
- Shawn Richards, 2026-

== Election results ==
=== National Assembly ===
Election year	Party leader	# of votes	% of vote	# of overall seats won	+/–	Outcome
1966	William Valentine Herbert	4,936	35.0 (#2)	2 / 10	▲2	Official Opposition
1971	William Valentine Herbert	5,397	37.0 (#2)	1 / 9	▼1	Official Opposition
1975	William Valentine Herbert	2,859	23.4 (#2)	0 / 9	▼1	No representation
1980	Kennedy Simmonds	4,990	33.9 (#2)	3 / 9	▲3	Coalition – Majority
1984	Kennedy Simmonds	8,596	47.6 (#1)	6 / 11	▲3	Coalition – Majority
1989	Kennedy Simmonds	8,090	45.4 (#1)	6 / 11	Steady	Coalition – Majority
1993	Kennedy Simmonds	6,449	33.6 (#2)	4 / 11	▼2	Coalition – Minority
1995	Kennedy Simmonds	7,530	34.7 (#2)	1 / 11	▼3	Opposition
2000	Kennedy Simmonds	6,462	29.6 (#2)	0 / 11	▼1	No representation
2004	Lindsay Grant	7,161	31.7 (#2)	1 / 11	▲1	Opposition
2010	Lindsay Grant	8,393	32.2 (#2)	2 / 11	▲1	Official Opposition
2015	Shawn Richards	8,452	27.9 (#2)	4 / 11	▲2	Coalition
2020	Shawn Richards	8,067	28.91 (#2)	4 / 11	Steady	Coalition (2020−22)
2020	Shawn Richards	8,067	28.91 (#2)	4 / 11	Steady	Opposition (2022)
2022	Shawn Richards	4,737	16.13 (#3)	1 / 11	▼3	Opposition

=== Nevis Local Council ===
Election year	Party leader	# of overall seats won	+/–	Outcome
1967	William Valentine Herbert	5 / 6	▲5	Majority on the Nevis Local Council
1971	Stopped contesting Nevisian elections			
