= National Assembly (Saint Kitts and Nevis) =

Parliament of Saint Kitts and Nevis

- 10th National Assembly

Type
- Type: Unicameral

Leadership
- Monarch: Charles III since 8 September 2022
- Governor-General: Dame Marcella Liburd since 1 February 2023
- Speaker: Lanien Blanchette, SKNLP since 25 October 2022
- Prime Minister: Terrance Drew, SKNLP since 6 August 2022
- Leader of the Opposition: Mark Brantley, CCM since 10 October 2022

Structure
- Seats: 15
- National Assembly political groups: HM Government: SKNLP (6); HM Loyal Opposition: CCM (3); PAM (1); PLP (1); Crossbench: Senators (3); Ex officio (1)

Elections
- National Assembly voting system: First-past-the-post
- Last National Assembly election: 5 August 2022

Meeting place
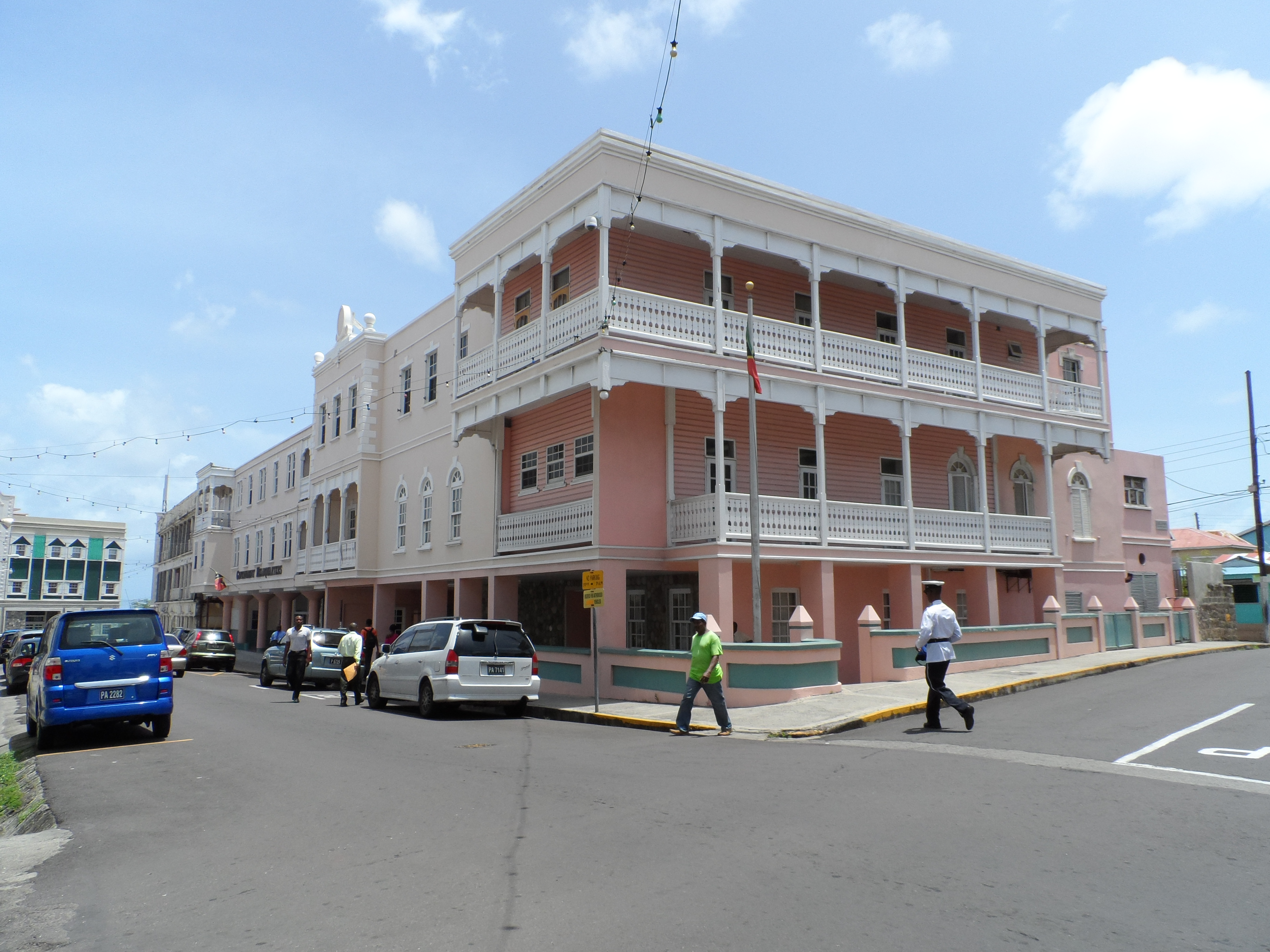

Website
- www.parliament.gov.kn

The National Assembly and the King of Saint Christopher and Nevis jointly make up the legislature of Saint Kitts and Nevis.

== Composition of the National Assembly ==
The assembly has 14 or 15 members (depending upon circumstances), 11 of whom are elected for a five-year term in single-seat constituencies and are known as Representatives. The remaining four are called Senators; three are appointed by the governor-general and the fourth is the attorney-general (i.e. an ex officio member).

The 1983 constitution mandates at least three senators, or four if the attorney-general is not one of these three appointed senators. The number can be increased by the parliament as long as it doesn't exceed two thirds of the number of representatives. Except for the attorney-general, the senators are appointed by the governor-general, acting on the advice of the prime minister in two of the appointments and the leader of the opposition for the third one.

== Legislative authority ==
Parliament is empowered by the 1983 constitution to make laws for the Peace, order, and good government of the federation, excepting those areas in the exclusive competence of the Nevis Island Legislature. Following passage by the National Assembly, Royal Assent is required to be given by the Governor-General of Saint Kitts and Nevis.

Amendments to the constitution require a two-thirds supermajority in the Assembly.

== Latest election ==
Party	Votes	%	Seats	+/–
Saint Kitts and Nevis Labour Party	13,438	45.75	6	+4
People's Labour Party	5,036	17.14	1	–1
People's Action Movement	4,737	16.13	1	–3
Concerned Citizens' Movement	3,473	11.82	3	0
Nevis Reformation Party	2,616	8.91	0	0
Moral Restoration Movement	67	0.23	0	New
Unity Labour Party	5	0.02	0	New
Independents	3	0.01	0	0
Appointed and ex-officio members			4	0
Total	29,375	100.00	15	0
Valid votes	29,375	99.39		
Invalid/blank votes	179	0.61		
Total votes	29,554	100.00		
Registered voters/turnout	50,973	57.98		
Source: SKN Times

=== Elected MPs ===
Constituency	MPs	Party
St Christopher #1	Geoffrey Hanley	Saint Kitts and Nevis Labour Party
St Christopher #2	Marsha Henderson	Saint Kitts and Nevis Labour Party
St Christopher #3	Konris Maynard	Saint Kitts and Nevis Labour Party
St Christopher #4	Samal Duggins	Saint Kitts and Nevis Labour Party
St Christopher #5	Shawn Richards	People's Action Movement
St Christopher #6	Denzil Douglas	Saint Kitts and Nevis Labour Party
St Christopher #7	Timothy Harris	People's Labour Party
St Christopher #8	Terrance Drew	Saint Kitts and Nevis Labour Party
Nevis #9	Mark Brantley	Concerned Citizens' Movement
Nevis #10	Eric Evelyn	Concerned Citizens' Movement
Nevis #11	Alexis Jeffers	Concerned Citizens' Movement
Source: SKN Vibes

== Speaker of the National Assembly ==
The Assembly has a speaker and deputy speaker elected by the members of the parliament during its first meeting following a general election. They do not have to be members of it; but if they are then they cannot also be in the cabinet or parliamentary secretaries.

The current speaker of the National Assembly of Saint Kitts and Nevis is Lanien Blanchette, who has been in office since October 2022. She succeeded Anthony Michael Perkins.

=== Previous speakers ===
Speakers of the Legislative Council and House of Assembly of Saint Christopher-Nevis-Anguilla

Name	Entered office	Left office	Notes
Hon. Henry Howard	1960	1962	
Hon. Milton Allen	1962	1971	
Hon. William Florian Glasford	1971	August 1978	
Hon. Ada Mae Edwards	1978	1980	
Hon. Herman W. Liburd	1980	1983	

Speakers of the National Assembly of St Kitts and Nevis

Name	Entered office	Left office	Notes
Hon. Ivan Buchanan	1983	1985	
Hon. Ivan Buchanan	1985	1995	
Hon. Walford Gumbs	1996	2004	
Hon. Marcella Liburd	December 2004	2008	
Hon. Curtis Martin	18 April 2008	16 January 2015	
Hon. Franklin Brand	May 2015	June 2016	
Hon. Anthony Michael Perkins	June 2016	October 2022	
Hon. Lanien Blanchette	October 2022	present	

== See also ==
- Politics of Saint Kitts and Nevis
- List of legislatures by country
