= Maurice Davis (judge) =

Kittitian judge and politician (1911–1988)

Sir Maurice Davis OBE

Chief Justice of the Eastern Caribbean Supreme Court
- In office 1975–1980
- Preceded by: P. Cecil Lewis
- Succeeded by: Neville Peterkin

Member of the Legislative Council of Saint Christopher-Nevis-Anguilla
- In office 1944–1957
- Preceded by: Joseph Matthew Sebastian

Personal details
- Born: 30 April 1911
- Died: 23 October 1988 (aged 77)
- Party: Workers' League; People's Progressive Movement

Sir Maurice Herbert Davis OBE (30 April 1911 – 23 October 1988) was a judge and politician from Saint Kitts and Nevis who was Chief Justice of the Eastern Caribbean Supreme Court from 1975 to 1980. In the 1940s and 1950s, he was affiliated with the Workers' League and a member of the Legislative Council of Saint Kitts-Nevis-Anguilla, but in the 1961 general elections led his own party, the People's Progressive Movement.

== Biography ==
Davis was born on 30 April 1911. He attended Basseterre Boys’ School, then at fifteen became a pupil teacher at the Trinity Government School. He later joined the civil service.

In 1941, Davis studied law at the Honourable Society of the Inner Temple in England, where he passed his bar exams and was called to the bar there. Davis returned to the Caribbean in 1943 and was called to the bar in Antigua and the Leeward Islands. He then practiced law in Saint Kitts-Nevis-Anguilla.

In 1944, Davis became a member of the Legislative Council of Saint Christopher-Nevis-Anguilla for the Workers' League, succeeding Joseph Matthew Sebastian, who had died in office. He was re-elected in the 1946 and 1952 general elections. In the 1953 Coronation Honours, Davis was appointed an Officer of the Most Excellent Order of the British Empire (OBE).

Davis did not run in the 1957 general elections. In the 1961 general elections, he led his own political party, the People's Progressive Movement (PPM), that ran as an alternative to the Workers' League. The PPM won 11% of the vote and failed to win any seats.

Following the Christena disaster in 1970, Davis was appointed to chair the Christena Disaster Fund.

In 1975, Davis was appointed Chief Justice of the Eastern Caribbean Supreme Court (at the time known as the West Indies Associated States Supreme Court), succeeding P. Cecil Lewis. In the 1975 Birthday Honours, he was made a Knight Bachelor. He served as Chief Justice until 1980 and was succeeded by Neville Peterkin.

== Personal life ==
In 1943, Davis married Sylvia Kathleen Kelsick.

Davis died on 23 October 1988.
