= Afro–Kittitians and Nevisians =

Afro-Kittitians and Nevisians
Regions with significant populations
- Saint Kitts and Nevis

Languages
- English

Religion
- Christianity, Rastafari movement

Related ethnic groups
- Afro-Caribbean

Afro–Kittitians and Nevisians are Saint Kitts and Nevis people whose ancestry lies within the continent of Africa, most notably West Africa.

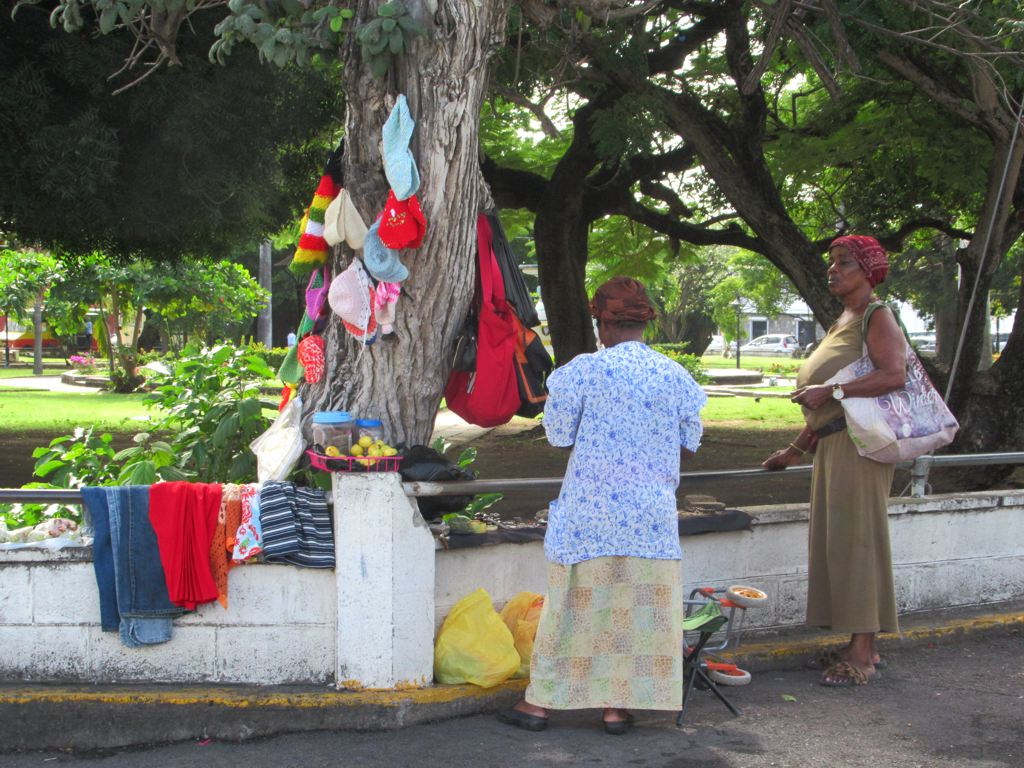
Clothing vendors in Basseterre

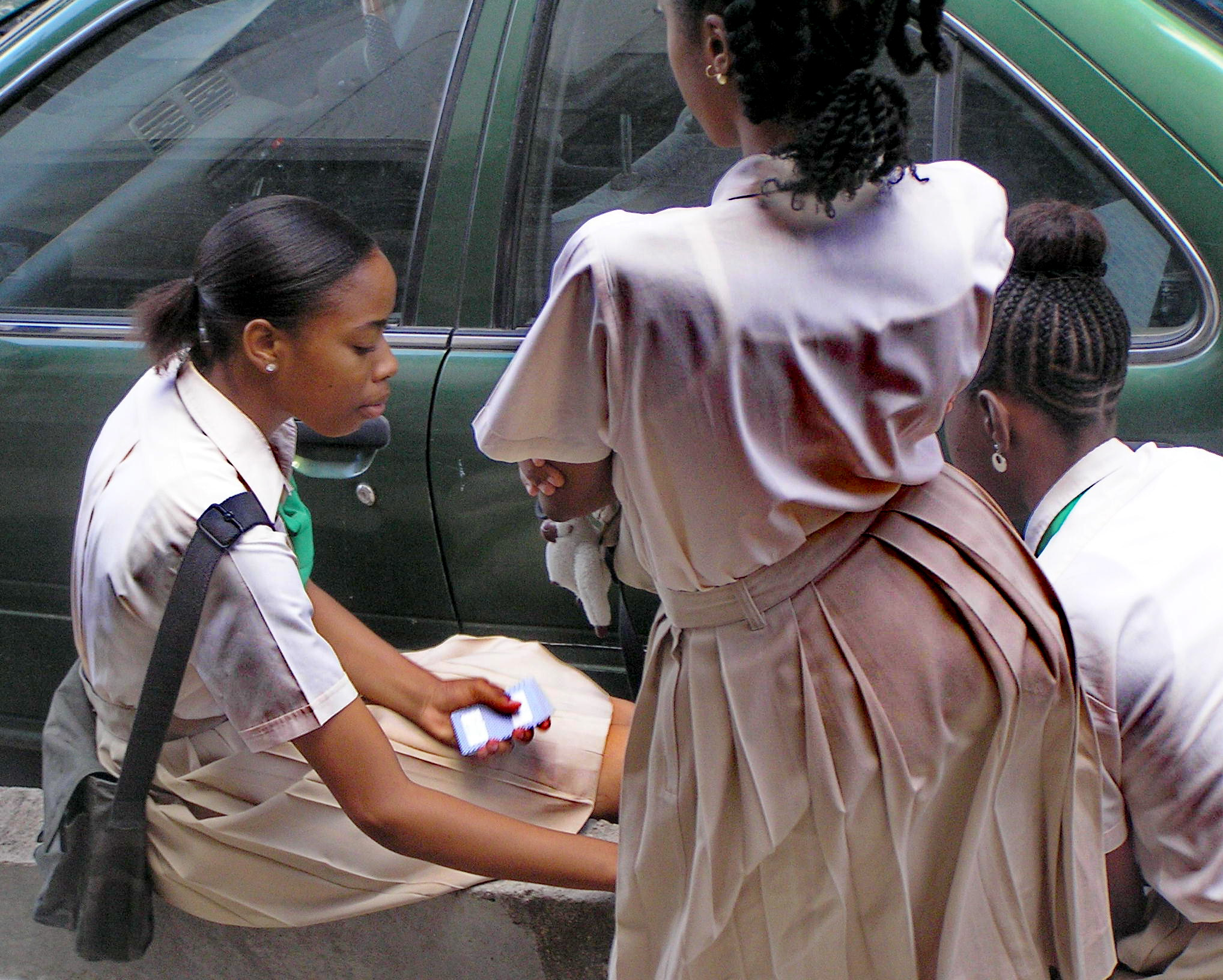
Schoolgirls playing cards in Basseterre

As of 2013, black people are the predominant ethnic group in Saint Kitts and Nevis.

== History ==
The initial arrival of Africans in St. Kitts and Nevis was in the late 17th century as a result of the slave trade. St Kitts, the largest of the two islands, has geography well suited for sugar plantations, but was plagued by colonial warfare in the late 16th and early 17th centuries. Nevis, which has similar geography and was relatively sheltered, became an early center of the slave trade in the West Indies. The first census of Nevis, conducted in 1671, recorded 1,739 African slaves. Six years later this number grew to 3,849, consisting of 1,422 men, 1,321 women, and 1,106 children. In contrast, a census in St. Kitts recorded 1,436 African slaves one year later. Attracted by the stability of Nevis, the Royal African Company headquartered their West Indian slave trade in the port city of Charlestown: from 1674 to 1688 more than 6,000 slaves were sold at auction here.

In the early years of the plantation system on St. Kitts and Nevis, slaves were forced to clear the forests in preparation for sugar production. The difficulty of this work, combined with poor rations, resulted in a slave death rate “that was incredibly high on the two islands during the later part of 17th century”. As the clearing work neared completion, planters tried to combat the high death rate by initiating a one-year “seasoning period” in which newly arrived slaves were supervised by older, trustworthy slaves. By the end of the 18th century over 65% percent of the islands’ slave populations were native born and slave importation had decreased to fewer than 100 a year.

There is little recorded information about the family structures of slaves on St. Kitts and Nevis, but slave “marriages” appear to have been encouraged as they were sometimes recorded by planters. Children might grow up partially in a nuclear family situation, but were socialized as a group. Oral traditions, such as the Anansi spider from West Africa, were passed down. Around the age of 4 or 5 children were first put to work, generally in groups called a “hogmeat gang”. In these “gangs” 5 or 6 children were supervised by a slave woman while they did lighter work such as weeding and feeding animals. At night, children would eat small meals, often prepared by their mothers, consisting mostly of imported grain.

In December the slave population had slightly more freedom and were often given extra beef and pork. The white population on the islands however organized guards to monitor the activities of slaves during their time off. In general, the white population was wary of slaves revolting. In 1639 the French had to dispatch 500 men to put down an uprising on St. Kitts. African slaves resisted bondage in other ways, such as taking food from their masters to supplement their meager rations, and meeting to elect their own officials.

On the eve of emancipation approximately 11% of the population on the islands were freed colored people. Skilled slaves could buy their freedom by earning wages for their crafts, such as carpentry and masonry, on their day off. Freedom could also be gained legislatively and through wills. Children with slave mothers and white fathers enjoyed relative freedom of movement, but were still barred from owning land and thus participating in government. Communities of freed people developed, with inhabitants mostly working trades but in some cases earning a living as merchants. From the 1770s onwards, freed people would often migrate to Trinidad or Demerara to earn higher wages.

=== African Origin ===
The slave population of t. Kitts and Nevis originated from a variety of ethnic groups from West and Central Africa. These include groups such as the Mande (Malinke, Bambara, Mende), Temne, Fulani, Akan, Igbo, and Congo. Of the African-born slave population in 1817, Central African populations were the most prominent, followed by the Igbo, and the Senegambians (mainly the Malinke).

=== Emancipation to 1900 ===
In 1833 the British Empire outlawed slavery, but full legal freedom didn't come to St. Kitts and Nevis until 1838. In addition, some absentee slave owners on St. Kitts freed all, or most, of their slaves. However, forced labour continued on the islands under the apprenticeship system. Under this system, former slave holders continued to own all farmable land and freedpeople had to buy their freedom by working 45 hours a week for a period of 4 to 6 years. Since Saturdays were market day, when slaves had traditionally sold wares for income, having to work 6 days a week was a large hindrance for apprentices attempting to purchase their freedom.

Slaves heard that the island of Antigua had granted full freedom to slaves and recognized the change to the apprenticeship system was simply bondage under another name. Thus, the transition from apprenticeship to slavery was met with both “quiet and disquiet” resistance. On the day the apprenticeship program was set to begin, August 2, 1834, few apprentices on St.Kitts showed up to their positions. Many apprentices instead left their homes and fled to the mountains. Most who continued to work held more skilled positions, reflecting the stratification among slaves themselves. The resistance was high enough that the governor of The Leeward Islands, Evan Murray Macgregor, announced that if apprentices didn't return by the 6th, martial law would go into effect.

Planters attempted to quell the revolt by identifying leaders and punishing them with jail time or lashes, but 2 weeks after the apprenticeship program was supposed to start, the majority of workers remained in the mountains. While August was the down season for farming, slave owners were still worried about their unattended livestock. To combat the revolt, planters burned the homes and possessions of absent apprentices. In addition, militia were sent into the mountains to drive resistance members from their temporary homes. The combination of these two actions brought most of the former slaves out of the mountains and martial law was lifted on August 18. There were no recorded deaths or injuries from the revolt, although some of the resistance received jail time, lashes, or were exiled. The remaining 3 1/2 years of the apprenticeship continued relatively peacefully.

After emancipation, differences began to develop between life on St. Kitts and on Nevis. Planters on Nevis, which is smaller and has less fertile land, had trouble offering competitive wages to their workers. To combat this, they allowed labourers to share in the profits of the sugarcane they grew. While white planters continued to own land, on Nevis black field labourers had greater ties to it. They thus had greater control over what could be planted. Subsequently, black peasant farmers on Nevis were able to grow more sustenance crops than their counterparts on St. Kitts.

While not legally barred from owning land, most blacks were practically barred from owning land through suppressive economic practices. Their survival thus continued to rely a great deal on the whims of the white land owning class. If blacks did manage to earn extra income, they would not find any banks on either of the two islands. Workers would either hide coins in their homes or purchase livestock as an investment. In the last two decades of the 19th century, sugar prices fell after German beet sugar hit English markets. The ensuing depression hit Afro–Kittitians and Nevisians especially hard. As in previous years many migrated to other islands, especially Trinidad, for work. Those that remained were in a state of starvation and in 1896 frustrated workers set fire to several sugar cane fields.

== Demography ==
In the year 2000, 92% of the population was African-Caribbean: So, 80% of the archipelago's population was of African descent, either totally or partially (75% black and 5.3% mulatto, partially of Irish origin) and 12% were Afro-Europeans (European of African descent). Only 8% of the population was from other origins (5% of people was of Indian origin and Afro-Indian and 3.3% from other parts of South Asia). The whites were 1% (of British, French, Portuguese and Lebanese descent).

== Notable Afro-Kittitian and Nevisians ==
- Marcus Rashford, footballer
- Cole Jermaine Palmer* , footballer
- Vance Amory former premier
- Joan Armatrading singer, songwriter
- Sir Clement Arrindell governor-general
- Keith Arthurton cricketer
- Robert Bradshaw former chief minister, premier
- Christene Browne filmwriter, producer
- Pogus Caesar television producer, director, artist
- Kim Collins sprinter
- Atiba Harris footballer
- Simeon Daniel former premier
- Denzil Douglas former prime minister
- Bertil Fox bodybuilder
- Keith "Kayamba" Gumbs footballer
- Erasmus James football player
- Sir Edmund Wickham Lawrence governor-general
- Rawlins Lowndes attorney, politician
- Sir Lee Moore former premier
- Derick Parry cricketer
- Joseph Walcott Parry premier of Nevis
- Caryl Phillips author
- Sir Cuthbert Sebastian governor-general
- Sir Kennedy Simmonds former prime minister
- Paul Southwell former chief minister (born in Dominica)
- Desai Williams Olympic medallist, sprinter
- Stuart Williams cricketer
- Cicely Tyson actress
- Tiquanny Williams, footballer
- Kimaree Rogers, footballer
