= 2007 Nevis 9 by-election =

2007 Nevis by-election

- 27 August 2007

Nevis 9 constituency
- Turnout: 61.5%
	First party	Second party
Candidate	Mark Brantley	Hensley Daniel
Party	CCM	NRP
Popular vote	1,475	1,445
Percentage	50.5	49.5
Member of Parliament before election
Malcolm Guishard
CCM
Elected Member of Parliament
Mark Brantley
CCM

A by-election was held for the Nevis 9 National Assembly constituency following the death of its representative and Leader of the Opposition, Malcolm Guishard, who had represented the seat since 1993. The result saw the Concerned Citizens' Movement (CCM) narrowly hold the seat by 30 votes.

== Background ==
The Nevis 9 constituency is a federal electoral district for the National Assembly of Saint Kitts and Nevis that covers the Saint John Figtree and Saint Paul Charlestown parishes on the island of Nevis. Since the 1993 election, the constituency had been represented by Malcolm Guishard from the CCM, who had been re-elected in the 1995, 2000, and 2004 elections. On 11 June 2007, Guishard died after being admitted to Alexandria Hospital following complications after a routine swim in Gallows Bay. At the time of his death, Guishard was also serving as Leader of the Opposition.

Following this, the seat became vacant, meaning a by-election was required.

== Candidates ==
The Concerned Citizens' Movement (CCM) put forward Mark Brantley, an attorney and nominated member of the Nevis Island Assembly. The Nevis Reformation Party stood Hensley Daniel, the Deputy Premier of Nevis.

== Results ==
The by-election was held on Monday 27 August 2007. The result saw the CCM hold the seat by just 30 votes, with Mark Brantley elected as the member of parliament for Nevis 9.

2007 Nevis 9 by-election
Party	Candidate	Votes	%	±%
CCM	Mark Brantley	1,475	50.5%	
NRP	Hensley Daniel	1,445	49.5%	
Rejected ballots		6		
Majority		30	1.0%	
Turnout		2926	61.5%	
Registered electors		4,758		
CCM hold		Swing		
