= Malcolm Guishard =

Nevisian politician (1952–2007)

Leader of the Opposition
- In office 2004 – 11 June 2007

Deputy Premier of Nevis
- In office June 1992 – July 2006
- Premier: Vance Amory

Personal details
- Born: Earl Malcolm Guishard; 13 January 1952
- Died: 11 June 2007 (aged 55)
- Party: Concerned Citizens' Movement

Earl Malcolm Guishard (13 January 1952 - 11 June 2007) was a Nevisian politician from the Concerned Citizens' Movement who served as Leader of the Opposition in the National Assembly from 2004 until his death in June 2007.

== Early life and career ==
Guishard was born on 13 January 1952. He was educated at primary and secondary schools in Nevis, and studied Business Education at the Caribbean Union College in Trinidad. He taught from 1971 to 1975 at Gingerland Junior School and Gingerland High School. In 1975, he began working as an accountant at Higgs and Hill. In 1977, he became owner and manager of Hamilton Quarries, and from 1980 to 1985 he worked at Shell Antilles and Guianas Ltd as an accounts clerk.

== Political career ==
=== Nevis politics ===
In the 1992 Nevis Island Assembly election, Guishard ran as a Concerned Citizens' Movement (CCM) candidate. He was elected as a member of the Nevis Island Assembly for the St John's constituency, defeating Simeon Daniel, the Premier of Nevis and leader of the Nevis Reformation Party. Guishard was subsequently appointed to serve in the new CCM-led Nevis Island Administration as Deputy Premier of Nevis and Minister of Communications, Tourism, Agriculture, Housing, Culture and Information. He was re-elected in the 1997 and 2001 elections and served in the assembly and as a minister until 2006, when he lost his seat in that year's election and the CCM went into opposition.

=== National politics ===
In the 1989 Saint Kitts and Nevis general election, Guishard unsuccessfully stood for the CCM against Simeon Daniel. In the 1993 general election, Guishard was elected to the National Assembly to serve as a member of parliament, and was re-elected in the 1995, 2000 and 2004 elections. He represented the constituency covering the St John's and St Paul's parishes. In 2004, he became Leader of the Opposition in the National Assembly, serving in this role and as an MP until his death in 2007.

== Personal life ==
Guishard was married and had children. On 11 June 2007, Guishard died aged 55, after attending the Alexandria Hospital with shortness of breath following a routine swim at Gallows Bay.

In December 2021, the Malcolm Guishard Recreational Park was opened, a recreational park in Nevis named after Guishard.
