= Order of the National Hero (disambiguation) =

Order of the National Hero (Order of the People's Hero) was a Yugoslav gallantry medal.

The Order of the National Hero also refers to the highest honour for merit in many Commonwealth Caribbean countries:

- Order of the National Hero (Antigua and Barbuda)
- Order of the National Hero (Bahamas)
- Order of National Heroes (Barbados)
- Order of the National Hero (Belize)
- Order of the National Hero (Grenada)
- Order of the National Hero (Jamaica)
- Order of the National Hero (Saint Kitts and Nevis)

It furthermore may refer to:

- Order of the National Hero (Georgia)
