= Minister of Finance of Saint Kitts and Nevis =

Responsible for public finances of the country

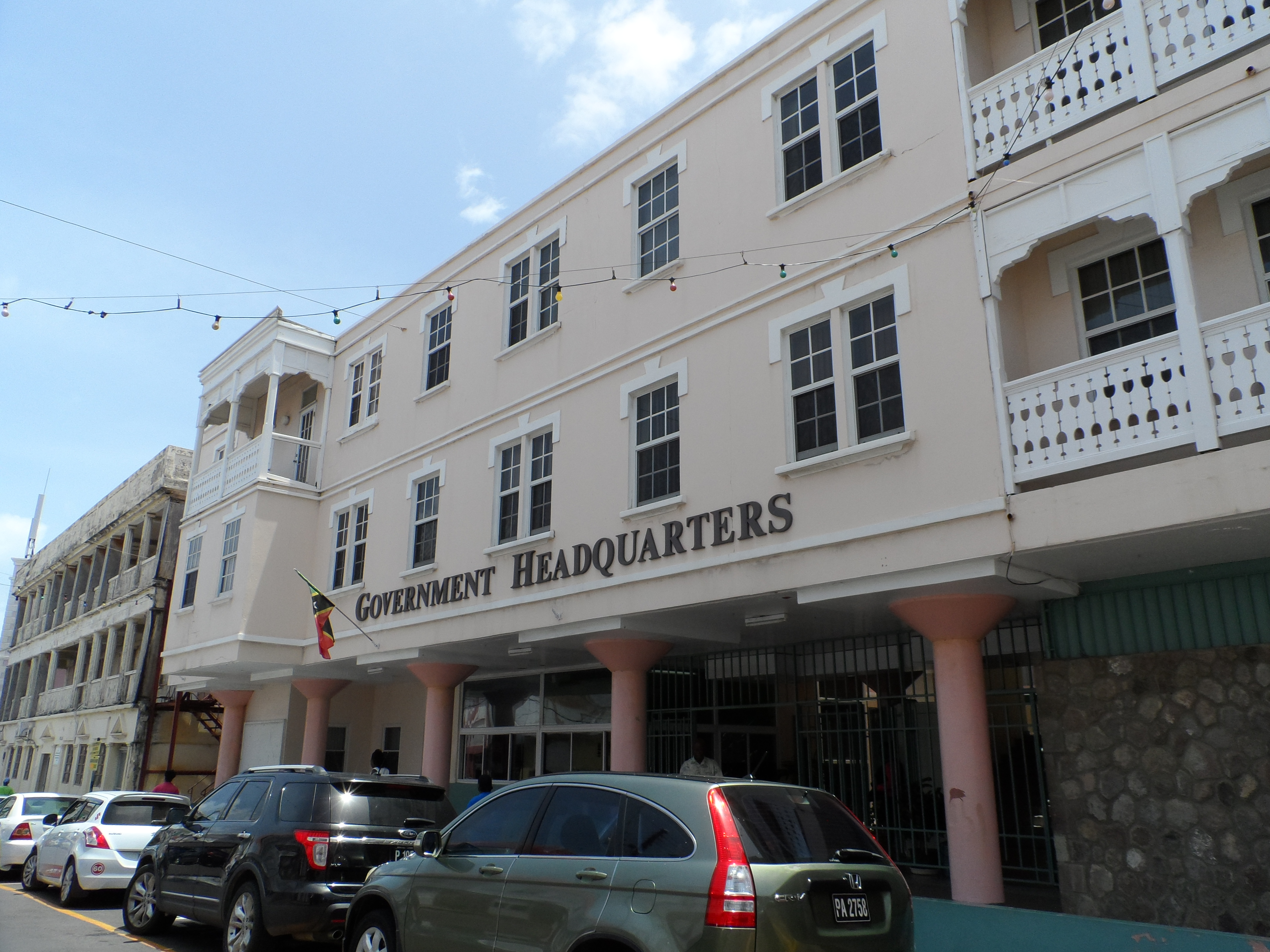
Government headquarters in Basseterre

Minister of Finance of Saint Kitts and Nevis is a cabinet minister in charge of the Ministry of Finance of Saint Kitts and Nevis, responsible for public finances of the country. The ministry is located at Government Headquarters, Basseterre

== Ministers of Finance ==
Name	Took office	Left office	Party	Notes
Paul Southwell	January 1960	May 1979	SKNLP	
Charles E. Mills	1979	February 1980	SKNLP	
Simeon Daniel	February 1980	1983	NRP	
Richard Llewellyn Caines	1983	1984	PAM	
Kennedy Simmonds	1984	July 1995	PAM	
Denzil Douglas	July 1995	November 2008	SKNLP	
Timothy Harris	November 2008	February 2010	SKNLP	
Denzil Douglas	February 2010	February 2015	SKNLP	
Timothy Harris	February 2015	August 2022	PLP	
Terrance Drew	August 2022	Incumbent	SKNLP	

== See also ==
- Government of Saint Kitts and Nevis
- Economy of Saint Kitts and Nevis
