= Heroes' Day =

National holiday in many countries

- Observed by: Multiple countries and territories
- Type: National
- Date: Various
- Frequency: Annual

Heroes' Day or National Heroes' Day may refer to a number of commemorations of national heroes in different countries and territories. It is often held on the birthday, or the death of a national hero or heroine, or the anniversary of their great deeds that made them heroes.

== Angola ==
National Heroes' Day in Angola is a holiday in Angola on 17 September, the birthday of the national hero Agostinho Neto.

== Bahamas ==
National Heroes' Day in the Bahamas has been a public holiday since 2013. It replaced Discovery Day, which celebrated the arrival of Christopher Columbus to the Americas.

== Barbados ==
National Heroes' Day is a public holiday in Barbados on 28 April, honoring the eleven national heroes of Barbados. It was first celebrated on 28 April 1998, the centenary of the birth of national hero Grantley Adams, after the passing of the Order of National Heroes Act 1998.

== Bermuda ==
National Heroes' Day has been an official holiday in Bermuda since 2008, when the centre-left government declared it would replace the Queen's Official Birthday marked in June. Over 2,000 residents signed a petition in protest calling to retain the Queen's Birthday holiday.

Initially observed in October, the holiday was moved to the third Monday of June in 2009.

Currently Bermuda has eight National Heroes, voting is open to the public once every decade as of June 2022, with the next nomination period beginning in 2025.

== Cape Verde ==
Heroes Day is a public holiday in Cape Verde on 20 January. It commemorates the 1973 assassination of Amílcar Cabral, who is remembered as a hero for fighting western colonialism and exploitation.

== Cayman Islands ==
The fourth Monday in January is National Heroes' Day in the Cayman Islands; it was proclaimed with the National Heroes Law, providing for the declaration of persons who have rendered exceptional service as national heroes. Numerous Caymanians have been declared national heroes, includes the Hon. James (Jim) Manoah Bodden, Mrs. Sybil I. McLaughlin, Mr. Thomas William Farrington, Mrs. Sybil Joyce Hylton, Mr. Desmond Vere Watler, Ms Mary Evelyn Wood, Cert. Hon. and William Warren Conolly.

== East Timor ==
31 December is National Heroes Day in East Timor. It commemorates the Indonesian invasion of East Timor.

== Guinea-Bissau ==
Heroes' Day is celebrated on 20 January to commemorate the assassination of independence leader Amilcar Cabral in 1973.

== Hungary ==
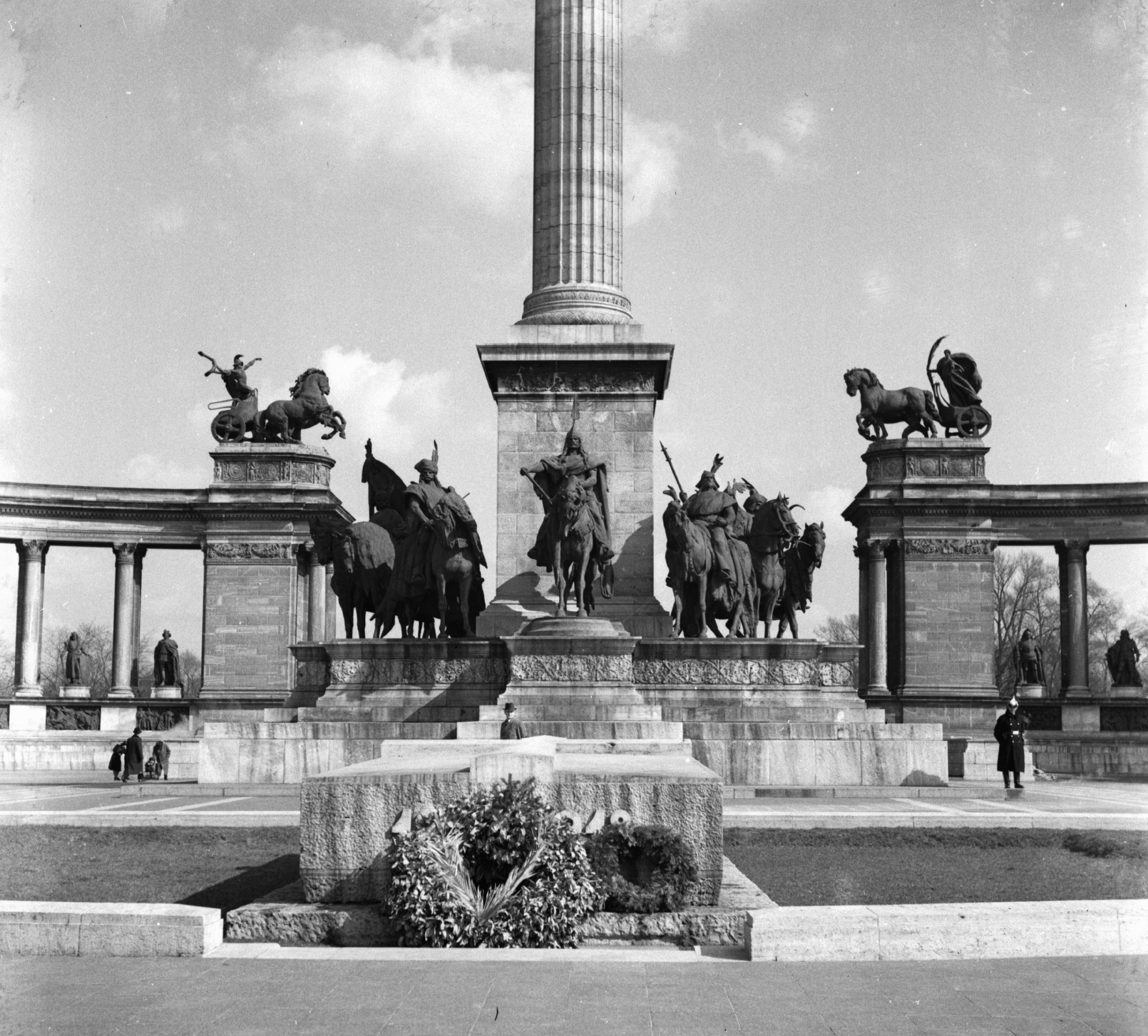
A wreath on Hősök tere in 1940.

Heroes' Day (Hungarian: Hősök napja), National Heroes' Day or the Memorial Day of Hungarian Heroes in Hungary is celebrated on 31 May as a public holiday. It is observed with military ceremonies at monuments such as the Tomb of the Unknown Soldier on Heroes' Square in Budapest all to commemorate soldiers in service to Hungary. It has been marked every year by the Hungarian Defence Force and the public since 2001.

== Indonesia ==
Hari Pahlawan (Indonesian for Heroes' Day) is a national day annually celebrated on 10 November in Indonesia. The day commemorates the 1945 Battle of Surabaya, in which pro-independence Indonesian local community, as well as soldiers and militia fought against British and Dutch troops as part of the Indonesian National Revolution.

== Jamaica ==
In Jamaica, Heroes' Day is celebrated annually on the third Monday of October. It started in 1969. It honours Alexander Bustamante, Jamaica's first prime minister; Nanny of the Maroons, who led a fight for independence in the early 18th century; Paul Bogle, who led the 1865 Morant Bay rebellion, marching for justice and the rights for all people; Samuel Sharpe, leader of the 1831 Baptist Wars slave rebellion; Marcus Garvey, world known activist, publisher and entrepreneur; George William Gordon, businessman, magistrate and politician executed for his alleged involvement in the Morant Bay rebellion and Norman Washington Manley, Jamaica's first and only Premier. The government recognizes all of these heroes on this date.

== Kenya ==
Mashujaa Day, also known as Heroes' Day (mashujaa is Swahili for "heroes"), is a national day in Kenya, which is observed on 20 October as a public holiday to collectively honour all those who contributed towards the struggle for Kenya's independence or positively contributed in the post independence Kenya. It was previously known as Kenyatta Day, which was celebrated to commemorate the detention in Kapenguria of freedom fighters Achieng' Oneko, Bildad Kaggia, Fred Kubai, Jomo Kenyatta, Kung'u Karumba and Paul Ngei, often referred to as the Kapenguria Six. However, following the promulgation of the Constitution of Kenya in August 2010, Kenyatta Day was renamed.

== Malaysia ==
Warriors' Day (Malay: Hari Pahlawan) is a day in Malaysia that commemorates the servicemen killed during the two World Wars and the Malayan Emergency. By extension, it honours all individuals who lost their lives in the line of duty throughout Malaysia's history. Until 2009, every year on 31 July, the King and the Prime Minister as well as senior representatives of the Royal Malaysian Police and the Armed Forces gathered at the National Monument in Lake Gardens to lay wreaths and pay homage to Malaysia's fallen heroes. They now gather at Merdeka Square, Kuala Lumpur, National Heroes' Square, Putrajaya or in Kem Perdana in Sungai Besi, also in KL (the 2014 event was held there).

== Mozambique ==
Heroes' Day is a public holiday in Mozambique on 3 February. It is set to commemorate those who lost their lives in the Portuguese Colonial War.

== Namibia ==
26 August is Heroes' Day in Namibia. It marks the beginning of the armed struggle during the Namibian War of Independence.

== Paraguay ==
Heroes' Day in Paraguay is a national public holiday held on 1 March. It commemorates the death of President Francisco Solano López at the battle of Cerro Cora in 1870, ending the War of the Triple Alliance.

== Philippines ==
National Heroes' Day (Filipino: Araw ng mga Bayani) is a national public holiday in the Philippines observed every last Monday in August to mark the anniversary of the Cry of Pugad Lawin, the beginning of the Philippine Revolution by the Katipunan and its Supremo Andrés Bonifacio in 1896. This holiday was originally kept on the last Sunday of August in 1931, but in 2007 was moved to its present date by President Gloria Macapagal-Arroyo to reduce work disruptions, allow for longer weekends, and boost domestic tourism and businesses.

== Romania ==
Heroes' Day in Romania is celebrated on the 40th day (Feast of the Ascension) from the Orthodox Easter. It is a national holiday; observed with military and religious festivities at the monuments dedicated to the national heroes (such as the Tomb of the Unknown Soldier).

== Rwanda ==
National Heroes' Day is a public holiday in Rwanda on 1 February.

== Saint Kitts and Nevis ==
National Heroes Day is a holiday in Saint Kitts and Nevis that is observed annually on 16 September. It honours individuals who have made significant contributions to the advancement of the nation. There are currently five national heroes: Robert Llewellyn Bradshaw, Paul Southwell, Joseph Nathaniel France, Simeon Daniel and Kennedy Simmonds.

- The holiday was established in 1996 by the Saint Kitts and Nevis Federal Parliament with the passage of the National Honours Act. The first observance of the holiday was on 16 September 1998 to honour Robert Llewellyn Bradshaw, the first Premier of Saint Kitts and Nevis and a former labour activist. The holiday is observed on his birthday.
- In 2004, former Premier and Chief Minister Paul Southwell, and former Social Services Minister and trade unionist Joseph Nathaniel France, were also affirmed as National Heroes by the National Assembly. In 2013, the first Premier of Nevis, Simeon Daniel, was added to the list of National Heroes.
- In 2015, Kennedy Simmonds, the first Prime Minister of Saint Kitts and Nevis, became the fifth person to be named as a National Hero. He is the first living person to receive this honour.

== Saint Vincent and the Grenadines ==
National Heroes' Day is a public holiday in Saint Vincent and the Grenadines, observed annually on 14 March. It commemorates the death of Joseph Chatoyer, a Garifuna leader who led resistance against British colonial expansion during the First and Second Carib Wars. Killed in battle at Dorsetshire Hill, Kingstown, on 14 March 1795, Chatoyer is regarded as the nation's first National Hero for his role in defending indigenous land and sovereignty along others. National Heroes' Day forms part of Heroes and Heritage Month, celebrated throughout March.

== Somaliland ==
National Heroes Day is a holiday in Somaliland that is observed annually on 17 October, and has been a public holiday since 2018.

== South Africa ==
Heroes' Day, also known as Kruger Day, was celebrated in the South African Republic and later in the Republic of South Africa until 1994.

== Sri Lanka ==
National Heroes Day in Sri Lanka is celebrated every 22 May. It has been celebrated since 1818 Kandyan rebellion against British invasion in Sri Lanka. In 2013, the 195th commemoration of the National Heroes' Day of Sri Lanka was held by the sponsorship of the Sri Lankan Government.

== Turks and Caicos Islands ==
In the Turks and Caicos Islands, National Heroes' Day takes place on the last Monday in May.

== Uganda ==
Heroes' Day in Uganda takes place every 9 June.

== United Kingdom ==
The United Kingdom first celebrated a National Heroes Day in 2011, on 21 October (the same day as the victory at Battle of Trafalgar). It was founded by Danny Glavin, a teacher from Fareham, Hampshire. After hearing about the tragic death of his childhood friend whilst serving in Afghanistan, he decided to fund-raise for a military charity in his memory. The day was endorsed by Prime Minister David Cameron. Now Glavin has founded The Inspiration Federation and coordinates the Heroes Day Educational Programme within schools across the United Kingdom.

== Zambia ==
Heroes' Day in Zambia is a public holiday celebrated on the first Monday in July annually. Heroes Day is a memorial day for those who perished during the independence struggles. Unity Day, also a public holiday, occurs the next day, celebrating a country with over 70 languages and dialects, united into one nation.

== Zimbabwe ==
Heroes' Day in Zimbabwe is a public holiday observed on the second Monday of August each year. This is a day to remember those who died during the liberation war or those who were declared National Heroes when they died and are buried at the National shrine, The National Heroes Acre in Harare. There are also 10 Provincial Heroes Acres where those who have not been accorded the highest honour but are recognised for the role they played during the Liberation War and are buried in the Provinces they would have come from.
