= Order of National Hero =

Order of National Hero may refer to:

- Order of the National Hero (Antigua and Barbuda)
- Order of the National Hero (Bahamas)
- Order of National Heroes (Barbados)
- Order of the National Hero (Belize)
- Order of the National Hero (Georgia)
- Order of the National Hero (Grenada)
- Order of the National Hero (Jamaica)
- Order of the National Hero (Saint Kitts and Nevis)
- Order of the People's Hero (Yugoslavia)
