= Glenn Phillip =

Kittitian basketball coach and politician (1967–2024)

The Honourable Glenn Phillip

Minister of Youth Empowerment, Sports, Information Technology, Telecommunications and Post
- In office 2010–2015
- Governors-General: Cuthbert Sebastian; Edmund Lawrence
- Prime Minister: Denzil Douglas

Member of Parliament
- In office 2010–2015
- Preceded by: Rupert Herbert
- Succeeded by: Lindsay Grant
- Constituency: St. Christopher 4

Personal details
- Born: 20 July 1967
- Died: 1 August 2024 (aged 57)
- Party: Saint Kitts and Nevis Labour Party
- Education: Quinnipiac College

Glenn "Ghost" Fitzroy Phillip (Note: First name also spelt Glen in multiple sources.) (20 July 1967 – 1 August 2024) was a basketball coach, former basketball player and politician from Saint Kitts and Nevis.

== Biography ==
Phillip was born on 20 July 1967. In 1988, Phillip became the first Saint Kitts and Nevis national to get a basketball scholarship, attending Quinnipiac College in the United States to study marketing, and in the early 1990s playing for the Quinnipiac College basketball team. He then returned to Saint Kitts and Nevis to play for and captain the national basketball team, and later went into basketball coaching.

In the 2010 general elections, Phillip was elected as the Saint Kitts and Nevis Labour Party member of parliament for Saint Christopher constituency 4, winning by 29 votes. He was also appointed to the cabinet as Minister of Youth Empowerment, Sports, Information Technology, Telecommunications and Post. In the 2015 general elections, Phillip lost his seat to Lindsay Grant by 32 votes.

In 2016, Phillip was announced to have returned to basketball to coach the Team St. Kitts basketball team.

On 1 August 2024, Phillip died, aged 57. Prior to his death, Phillip had been serving as an advisor in the Ministry of Sports.

Phillip received a lying-in-state at the government headquarters and an official funeral on 20 August 2024. All national flags at government buildings were also lowered to half-mast on the day of the funeral.
