= 1989 Saint Kitts and Nevis general election =

- 21 March 1989

11 of the 15 seats in the National Assembly 6 seats needed for a majority
- Registered: 26,481
- Turnout: 66.55% (▼7.72pp)
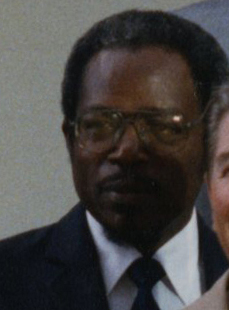

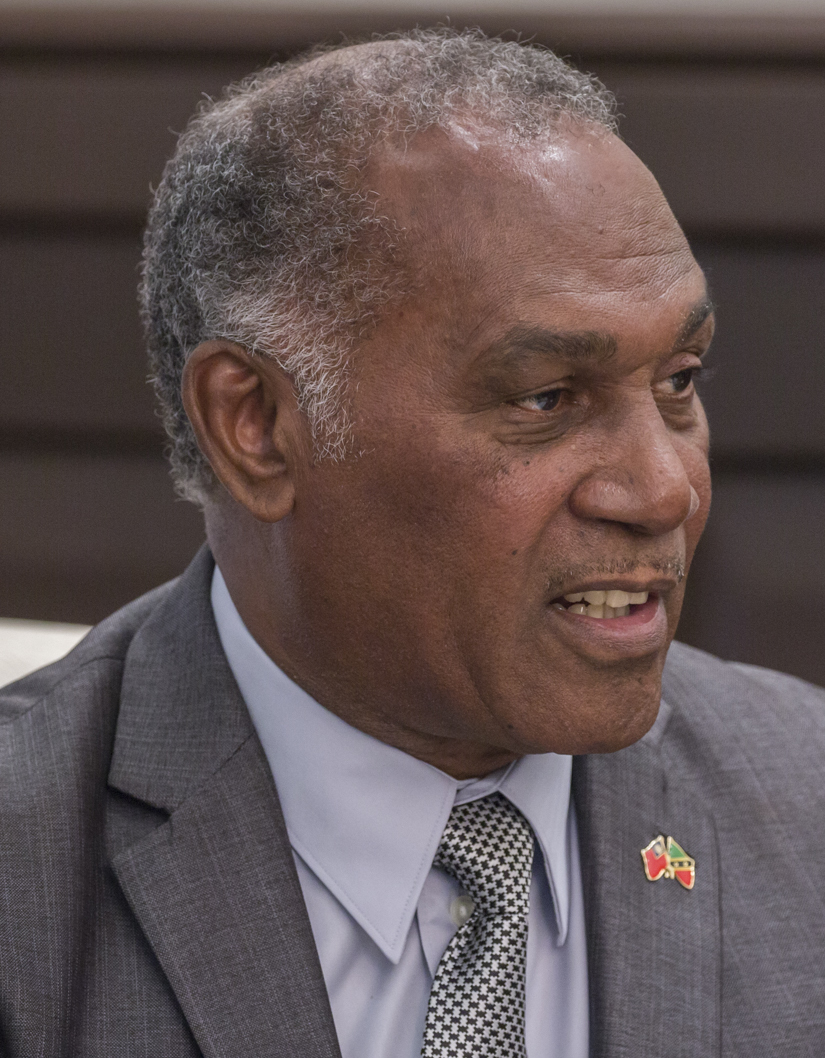
	First party	Second party
		SKNLP
Leader	Kennedy Simmonds	Lee Moore
Party	PAM	SKNLP
Seats won	6	2
Seat change	Steady	Steady
Popular vote	7,780	6,635
Percentage	44.37%	37.84%
Swing	▼3.21pp	▼3.47pp
	Third party	Fourth party
	NRP
Leader	Simeon Daniel	Vance Amory
Party	NRP	CCM
Seats won	2	1
Seat change	▼1	▲1
Popular vote	1,948	1,135
Percentage	11.11%	6.47%
Swing	▲0.98pp	new
Prime Minister before election
Kennedy Simmonds
PAM–NRP
Elected Prime Minister
Kennedy Simmonds
PAM–NRP

General elections were held in Saint Kitts and Nevis on 21 March 1989. The result was a victory for the People's Action Movement (PAM), which won six of the eleven directly-elected seats. The ruling majority coalition of PAM and the Nevis Reformation Party continued as a result of the elections.

== Results ==
Party	Votes	%	Seats	+/–
People's Action Movement	7,780	44.37	6	0
Saint Kitts and Nevis Labour Party	6,635	37.84	2	0
Nevis Reformation Party	1,948	11.11	2	–1
Concerned Citizens' Movement	1,135	6.47	1	New
Progressive Liberal Party	20	0.11	0	0
Kelsick and Wilkin Monopoly Breakers	16	0.09	0	0
Appointed members			4	0
Total	17,534	100.00	15	0
Valid votes	17,534	99.50		
Invalid/blank votes	88	0.50		
Total votes	17,622	100.00		
Registered voters/turnout	26,481	66.55		
Source: Caribbean Elections
