= Hensley Daniel =

Hensley Daniel (born in 1959) is a former Nevisian politician who was a member of the Nevis Island Assembly and minister in the Nevis Island Administration from 2006 until 2012.

== Early life and education ==
Daniel was born in 1959 in Cox, Nevis. From 1977 until 1988 he worked as a high school teacher. He then studied at the University of the West Indies, receiving a BSc degree in social work. From 1991 until 1999 he was director of youth and community services in Nevis. From 2000 to 2006 he worked in consultancy, and from 2002 to 2004 was a program officer working on family health and HIV/Aids projects in various Caribbean countries.

== Political career ==
From 2000 to 2001, Daniel was a nominated member of the Nevis Island Assembly. In the 2001 Nevis Island Assembly election, Daniel unsuccessfully stood for the Nevis Reformation Party (NRP) in the St John parish/electoral district #2.

In the 2006 Nevis Island Assembly election, Daniel again ran as an NRP candidate in the St John parish and was elected, beating incumbent Concerned Citizens' Movement representative Malcolm Guishard by 28 votes. He then also served as Deputy Premier of Nevis and Minister of Health, Gender and Social Affairs, Youth and Sports, Community Affairs, Trade and Industry, Culture, Telecommunications and Information in the Nevis Island Administration. In the 2007 by-election for the National Assembly Nevis 9 constituency seat following the death of Malcolm Guishard, Daniel unsuccessfully stood as the NRP candidate, losing to CCM's Mark Brantley by 30 votes.

In the 2011 Nevis Island Assembly election, Daniel was initially re-elected after results originally showed him winning by 14 votes against CCM's Mark Brantley, however the result faced a legal challenge by the CCM. In August 2012, Daniel resigned from the Assembly and as a minister following a court ruling that voided the 2011 election result and meant a re-run of the seat's election was required. However, instead of calling a by-election for the seat, Premier Joseph Parry called a general election for the whole assembly. In the 2013 Nevis Island Assembly election, Daniel lost the seat to Brantley by 236 votes.
