= 2017 Nevis Island Assembly election =

Nevis Island Assembly elections

- 18 December 2017

5 of the 8 seats in the Nevis Island Assembly
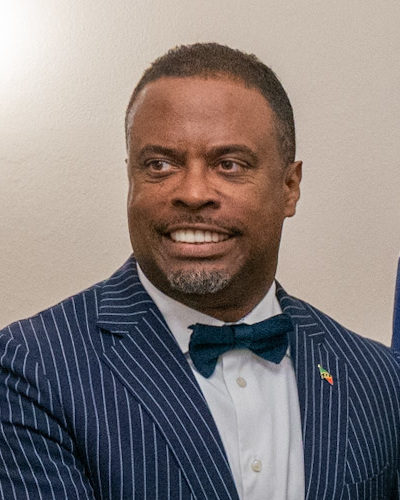

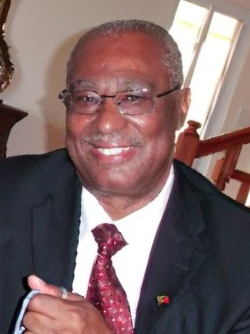
	First party	Second party
Leader	Mark Brantley	Joseph Parry
Party	CCM	NRP
Last election	55.1%, 3 seats	44.9%, 2 seats
Seats won	4	1
Seat change	▲1	▼1
Popular vote	3,753	2,864
Percentage	56.7%	43.3%
Swing	▲2.9pp	▼2.9pp
- Results by constituency.
Premier before election
Vance Amory
CCM
Premier after election
Mark Brantley
CCM

Island Assembly elections were held in Nevis on 18 December 2017 to elect five members of the Nevis Island Assembly.

The result was a win for the Concerned Citizens' Movement (CCM), led by Mark Brantley, which won four of the five seats. The opposition Nevis Reformation Party (NRP) won one seat.

== Results ==
Party	Votes	%	Seats
Concerned Citizens' Movement	3,753	56.72	4
Nevis Reformation Party	2,864	43.28	1
Appointed members			3
Total	6,617	100.00	8
Valid votes	6,617	98.86	
Invalid/blank votes	76	1.14	
Total votes	6,693	100.00	
Registered voters/turnout	11,303	59.21	
Source: NIA

=== By parish ===
St Paul's
Party	Candidate	Votes	%
CCM	Spencer Brand	596	50.5%
NRP	Robelto Hector	585	49.5%
Total votes		1,181	

St John's
Party	Candidate	Votes	%
CCM	Mark Brantley	1,334	57.2%
NRP	Hensley Daniel	1,000	42.8%
Total votes		2,334	

St George's
Party	Candidate	Votes	%
CCM	Eric Evelyn	761	76.6%
NRP	Cory Tyson	233	23.4%
Total votes		994	

St James'
Party	Candidate	Votes	%
CCM	Alexis Jeffers	833	61.2%
NRP	Virgil Browne	528	38.8%
Total votes		1,361	

St Thomas'
Party	Candidate	Votes	%
NRP	Joseph Parry	518	69.3%
CCM	Keith Scarborough	229	30.7%
Total votes		747	
