= Drew ministry =

Drew ministry may refer to:

- Drew ministry (Ontario)
- Drew ministry (Saint Kitts and Nevis)
