= Joyelle Clarke =

Saint Kitts and Nevis politician

The Honourable Dr Joyelle Clarke

Minister of Sustainable Development, Climate Action, Constituency Empowerment and Environment
- Incumbent
- Assumed office August 2022
- Monarchs: Elizabeth II; Charles III
- Prime Minister: Terrance Drew

Personal details
- Party: Saint Kitts and Nevis Labour Party
- Education: University of the West Indies

Joyelle Clarke is a politician from Saint Kitts and Nevis who has served in the federal government as the environment minister since 2022, and has been a Senator in the National Assembly since 2020. She is affiliated with the Saint Kitts and Nevis Labour Party.

== Career ==
In 2012, Clarke became Director of the Saint Kitts and Nevis Department of Constituency Empowerment. In 2013, she completed a geography PhD at the department of geography of the University of the West Indies in Mona, Jamaica. Clarke is described in an official government biography as being "involved in Social Impact Assessments and Sustainable livelihoods research for over 15 years" and having worked on projects for the government related to sustainability and conservation. She also has worked as a teacher in Cayon, Saint Kitts.

In August 2020, Clarke was selected from a list of 30 Saint Kitts and Nevis Labour Party (SKNLP) members by the party executive to serve as an appointed member (Senator) of the National Assembly. She was sworn in as an Opposition Senator on 12 August 2020, succeeding Nigel Carty.

In August 2022, following the SKNLP victory in the 2022 general election, Clarke was appointed to serve in Terrance Drew's government as minister for sustainable development, climate action, constituency empowerment and the environment. She was also re-appointed as a Senator.

In March 2024, Clarke was elected to the Bureau of the 7th United Nations Environment Assembly, serving on the Bureau as Rapporteur and being the only member of this body from a Small Island Developing State. In September 2025, Clarke addressed the United Nations General Assembly on behalf of the Caribbean Community (CARICOM).
