= Lindsay Grant =

Saint Kitts and Nevis politician and lawyer

The Honourable Lindsay Grant
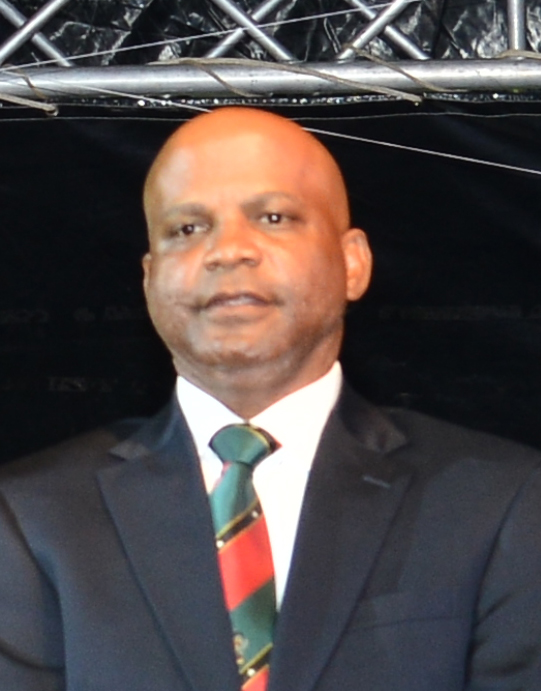

Minister of Tourism, International Trade, Industry and Commerce
- In office 22 February 2015 – May 2022
- Prime Minister: Timothy Harris

Personal details
- Born: Lindsay Fitz-Patrick Grant; 1 November 1964 (age 61)
- Party: People's Action Movement
- Education: Norman Manley Law School, Harvard Law School

Lindsay Fitz-Patrick Grant (born 1 November 1964) is a Saint Kitts and Nevis politician and lawyer. He served as Leader of the People's Action Movement until his resignation in July 2012.

== In politics ==
In the 2004 elections, Grant ran as a candidate for the National Assembly of Saint Kitts and Nevis in Constituency #4, where he faced off against Rupert Hubert of the Saint Kitts and Nevis Labour Party, and lost to him by 51 votes amidst allegations of irregularities on the voter rolls. In the 2010 elections, Grant faced off against Glenn Phillip in the same constituency, and again lost by 29 votes. He filed an election petition in the Eastern Caribbean Supreme Court to challenge the results of that election; the matter came before Judge Indra Hariprashad-Charles, who ruled against Grant in November 2010. He resigned from his position as Leader of the People's Action Movement in July 2012.

In July 2013, Grant led a protest march through the streets of Basseterre and was arrested after an argument with police officers enforcing the government decision to refuse them permission to march past Government Headquarters in Church Street. Grant was held for four hours and charged with obstruction, while hundreds of supporters surrounded the police station and chanted slogans calling for his release. Grant was set free on bail.

=== Controversies ===
In 2010 Lindsay Grant was involved in a bribery scandal. A video appeared in which Grant agreed to accept 1.7 million USD for party campaign financing in return for selling land to a supposed investor below market value.

== Other activities ==
Grant is a senior partner of the Basseterre law firm Grant Powell & Co., where his areas of practice include immigration law, citizenship law, trust law, and insurance law. He graduated from the Norman Manley Law School in Jamaica and Harvard Law School in the United States. He renounced United States citizenship in 2009 during the debate on the National Assembly Elections (Amendment) Bill, which barred dual citizens from standing for election.
