= People's Progressive Movement =

People's Progressive Movement can refer to:

- People's Progressive Movement (Barbados)
- People's Progressive Movement (Cayman Islands)
- People's Progressive Movement (Malawi)
- People's Progressive Movement (Saint Kitts-Nevis-Anguilla)
