= 1952 Saint Kitts-Nevis-Anguilla general election =

General elections were held in Saint Kitts-Nevis-Anguilla on 6 October 1952, the country's first elections held under universal suffrage. The Workers' League won seven of the eight elected seats.

== Background ==
The previous elections had taken place in 1946, and the next elections were due in 1949. However, they were postponed each year until 1952.

A new constitution introduced in 1952 provided for a 14-member Legislative Council, consisting of eight elected members, the Governor (as President of the Council), two ex officio members and three appointed members.

== Results ==
Party	Votes	%	Seats	+/–
Workers' League	10,528	80.95	7	+2
Saint Kitts Democratic Party	482	3.71	0	New
Independents	1,996	15.35	1	0
Non-elected members			6	–
Total	13,006	100.00	14	–
Valid votes	13,006	98.03		
Invalid/blank votes	261	1.97		
Total votes	13,267	100.00		
Source: Nohlen, Midgett
