= Joseph Nathaniel France =

The Right Excellent Sir Joseph Nathaniel France

Member of the National Assembly of Saint Kitts and Nevis
- In office 1946–1984

Personal details
- Born: 16 September 1907 Mount Lily, Saint James Windward Parish, Nevis
- Died: 21 May 1997 (aged 89)
- Party: Labour Party (1940–1997)

Sir Joseph Nathaniel France, KCMG, CBE (16 September 1907 – 21 May 1997) was a Saint Kitts and Nevis politician and trade union leader.

== Life and career ==
France served as a representative in the National Assembly and as Minister of Social Services under Chief Minister Paul Southwell. He was also the General Secretary for the St. Kitts and Nevis Trades and Labour Union.

In 1996, France became a Knight Commander of the Order of St Michael and St George. In 2004, France was posthumously granted the title of National Hero by the National Assembly and is honoured annually on National Heroes Day. The general hospital in St. Kitts was named in his honour.
