= Leader of the Opposition (Saint Kitts and Nevis) =

Person who leads the official opposition in Saint Kitts and Nevis

Leader of His Majesty's Loyal Opposition is a constitutionally sanctioned office in Saint Kitts and Nevis. The Constitution requires that there shall be a Leader of the Opposition in the National Assembly of Saint Kitts and Nevis who shall be appointed by the Governor-General of Saint Kitts and Nevis. Usually the person comes from the largest group in the National Assembly that is not in government.

National Assembly has 11 directly elected members, and 4 members who are appointed by the Governor General on the advice of the Prime Minister and the Leader of the Opposition.

== List of leaders of His Majesty's Loyal Opposition ==
Name	Took office	Left office	Party	Notes
Lee Moore	1980	1984	SKNLP	
Charles Egbert Mills	1984	1989	SKNLP	
Denzil Douglas	1989	July 1995	SKNLP	
Hugh Heyliger	1995	2000	PAM	
Vance Amory	2000	2004	CCM	
Malcolm Guishard	December 2004	June 2007	CCM	
Mark Brantley	October 2007	February 2015	CCM	
Denzil Douglas	February 2015	July 2022	SKNLP	
Mark Brantley	October 2022	Incumbent	CCM	

== See also ==
- Politics of Saint Kitts and Nevis
- National Assembly of Saint Kitts and Nevis
- Prime Minister of Saint Kitts and Nevis
