= Order of the National Hero (Saint Kitts and Nevis) =

Highest honor of Saint Kitts and Nevis

Awarded by Governor-General of Saint Kitts and Nevis
- Type: National order
- Established: 1998
- Status: Currently constituted
- President: Governor-General of Saint Kitts and Nevis

Statistics
- Total inductees: 5
- Ribbon bar of the Order

The Order of the National Hero is the highest order of merit awarded by the government of Saint Kitts and Nevis. The order was founded in 1998. Recipients of this honour are styled as "The Right Excellent".

== Recipients ==
- 1998: Robert Llewellyn Bradshaw, first Premier of Saint Kitts and Nevis.
- 2004: Paul Southwell, second Premier of Saint Kitts and Nevis.
- 2004: Sir Joseph Nathaniel France, KCMG, CBE, politician and trade union leader.
- 2013: Simeon Daniel, first Premier of Nevis.
- 2015: Sir Kennedy Simmonds, KCMG, first Prime Minister of Saint Kitts and Nevis. He is the first living person to receive this honour.

== See also ==
- National Heroes Day (Saint Kitts and Nevis)
