= Isalean Philip =

Saint Kitts and Nevis politician

Junior Minister in the Ministry of Social Development, Youth Empowerment, Gender Affairs, Aging and Disabilities
- Incumbent
- Assumed office August 2022
- Monarchs: Elizabeth II; Charles III
- Prime Minister: Terrance Drew

Personal details
- Party: Saint Kitts and Nevis Labour Party
- Education: Saint Mary's University (Halifax)

Isalean Philip is a Saint Kitts and Nevis politician from the Saint Kitts and Nevis Labour Party. She was appointed Junior Minister in the Ministry of Social Development, Youth Empowerment, Gender Affairs, Aging and Disabilities in the Drew ministry in August 2022.
