= 1946 Saint Kitts-Nevis-Anguilla general election =

General elections were held in Saint Kitts-Nevis-Anguilla on 30 July 1946. The Workers' League won all the elected seats, with no party running against them.

== Electoral system ==
The Council had five elected members, with each island acting as a constituency; St Kitts returned three members, whilst Anguilla and Nevis returned one each. The right to vote was restricted to those over the age of 21 who had an income of at least £30 per annum, owned property with a value of at least £100, paid at least £12 of rent per year, or had paid at least 15 shillings of direct tax in the previous year.

== Results ==
Constituency	Candidate	Party	Votes	%	Notes
Anguilla	D. Lloyd		61	59.80	Elected
Anguilla	W. Hodge		41	40.20	
Nevis	R.J. Gordon		Unopposed		Elected
St Kitts	Robert Llewellyn Bradshaw	Workers' League	Unopposed		Elected
St Kitts	Joseph Nathaniel France	Workers' League	Unopposed		Elected
St Kitts	Maurice Davis	Workers' League	Unopposed		Elected
Source: O'Flaherty
