= Troy Liburd =

Nevisian politician

The Honourable Troy Liburd

Junior Minister in the Nevis Island Administration
- Incumbent
- Assumed office January 2013
- Premier: Vance Amory; Mark Brantley

Senator of the Nevis Island Assembly
- Incumbent
- Assumed office March 2013

Personal details
- Party: Concerned Citizens' Movement

Uthant Troy Liburd is a Nevisian politician who serves in the Nevis Island Administration as a junior minister and as a Senator (nominated member) of the Nevis Island Assembly.

== Political career ==
In late January 2013, following an election for the Nevis Island Assembly, Liburd was appointed as a junior minister in the Concerned Citizens' Movement (CCM)-governed Nevis Island Administration (NIA) led by Premier Vance Amory. Liburd's ministerial portfolio included responsibility for the Environment, Public Utilities, Public Works, Posts, Physical Planning, and Food and Water Control. In March 2013, Liburd became a nominated member (Senator) of the Nevis Island Assembly.

In 2017, he was re-appointed to serve in the CCM-led NIA (now under Premier Mark Brantley) as a junior minister with responsibility for Education, Library Services, and Information Technology.

Following the 2022 election, Liburd was again appointed as a Senator and junior minister, holding ministerial responsibilities for Education, Library Services, Information Technology, Youth, and Sports.
