= Kelsick and Wilkin Monopoly Breakers =

Kelsick and Wilkin Monopoly Breakers was a political party in Saint Kitts and Nevis. The party first contested national elections in 1984, but received only 32 votes and failed to win a seat. They ran again in the 1989 elections, but received just four votes. The party did not contest any further elections. The party's goal was to end the supposed monopoly of the Kelsick & Wilkin law firm over the country's legal process.
