= Progressive Liberal Party (Saint Kitts and Nevis) =

The Progressive Liberal Party was a political party in Saint Kitts and Nevis. The party contested the 1989 general elections, but received just 12 votes and failed to win a seat. They did not contest any further national elections.
