= United People's Party (Saint Kitts and Nevis) =

The United People's Party was a political party in Saint Kitts and Nevis that was founded and led by former Deputy Prime Minister Michael Oliver Powell. The party first contested national elections in 1993, when they received 3% of the vote and failed to win any seats. In the 1995 elections they received just 71 votes and again failed to win a seat. The party did not contest any further elections.

== Election results ==
=== National Assembly ===
Election year	# of votes	% of vote	# of overall seats won	+/–	Outcome
1993	605	3.1 (#5)	0 / 11	new	Extra-parliamentary
1995	71	0.3 (#5)	0 / 11	Steady	Extra-parliamentary
