= 1992 Nevis Island Assembly election =

- 1 June 1992

All 5 elected seats in the Nevis Island Assembly
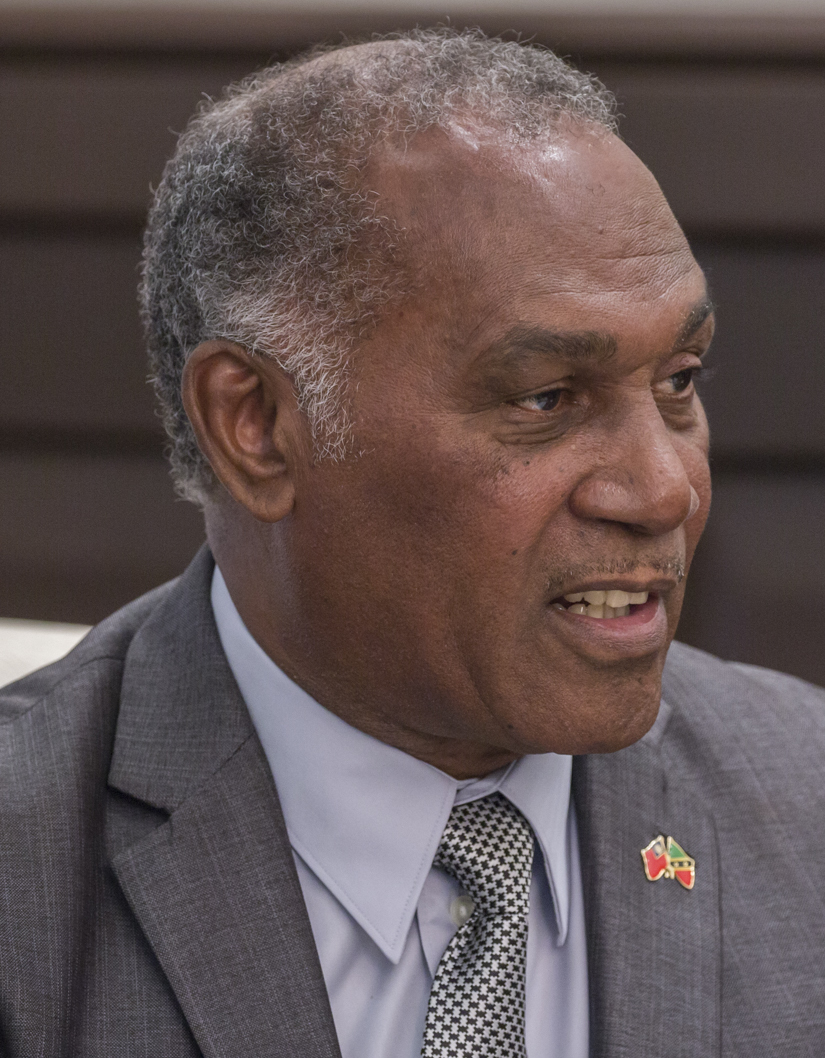

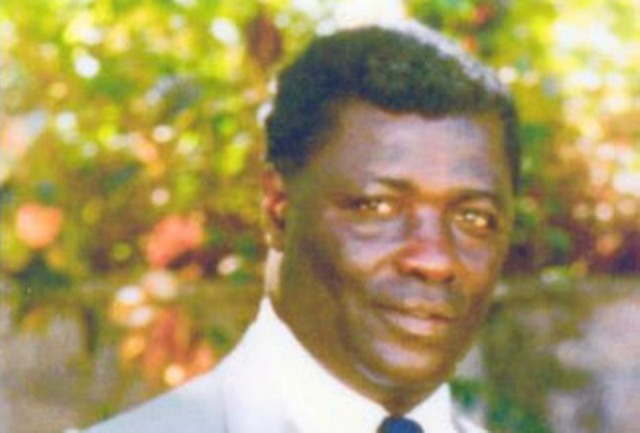
	First party	Second party
Leader	Vance Amory	Simeon Daniel
Party	CCM	NRP
Last election	1	4
Seats won	3	2
Seat change	▲2	▼2
Premier before election
Simeon Daniel
Nevis Reformation Party
Premier after election
Vance Amory
CCM

An election was held in Nevis on 1 June 1992 to elect five members of the Nevis Island Assembly. The election saw the opposition Concerned Citizens' Movement (CCM) win a majority after increasing their representation from one to three of five seats, while the ruling Nevis Reformation Party (NRP) lost two seats to the CCM, winning two out of five seats. The election saw a turnout of 65.7% of registered voters.

This was the first time the NRP had lost power since the founding of the assembly in 1983, and despite the NRP winning more votes overall than the CCM. Following the election, CCM leader Vance Amory was sworn in as Premier of Nevis, while the defeat for the NRP saw outgoing premier Simeon Daniel step down as leader of the NRP.

== Elected members ==
The following members were elected for the assembly's five electoral districts:

District	Elected members	
District	Party	Member
1 - Saint Paul	NRP	Victor Jay Martin
2 - Saint John	CCM	Malcolm Guishard
3 - Saint George	CCM	Vance Amory
4 - Saint James	CCM	Leonard Flaherty-Small
5 - Saint Thomas	NRP	Joseph Parry
