= 1943 Saint Kitts-Nevis-Anguilla general election =

General elections were held in Saint Kitts-Nevis-Anguilla on 20 September 1943. The Workers' League won all the elected seats, defeating an alliance of merchants and planters nominated by the Agricultural and Commercial Society.

== Electoral system ==
The Legislative Council had five elected members, with each island acting as a constituency; St Kitts returned three members, whilst Anguilla and Nevis returned one each. The right to vote was restricted to those over the age of 21 who had an income of at least £30 per annum, owned property with a value of at least £100, paid at least £12 of rent per year, or had paid at least 15 shillings of direct tax in the previous year.

== Results ==
Constituency	Candidate	Party	Votes	%	Notes
Anguilla	W Hodge		29	54.72	Elected
Anguilla	Albert Elliot Owen		24	45.28	
Nevis	R J Gordon				Elected
Nevis	F Henville				
St Kitts	J L Harney	Workers' League	682	30.03	Elected
St Kitts	Joseph Matthew Sebastian	Workers' League	680	29.94	Elected
St Kitts	S James	Workers' League	666	29.33	Elected
St Kitts	J W Blackett		243	10.70	
Source: O'Flaherty

== Aftermath ==
Sebastian died on 25 June 1944. The subsequent by-election was won by Maurice Davis.
