= 2006 Nevis Island Assembly election =

- 10 July 2006

5 of the 8 seats in the Nevis Island Assembly
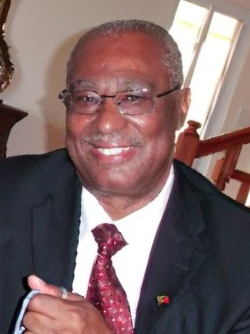

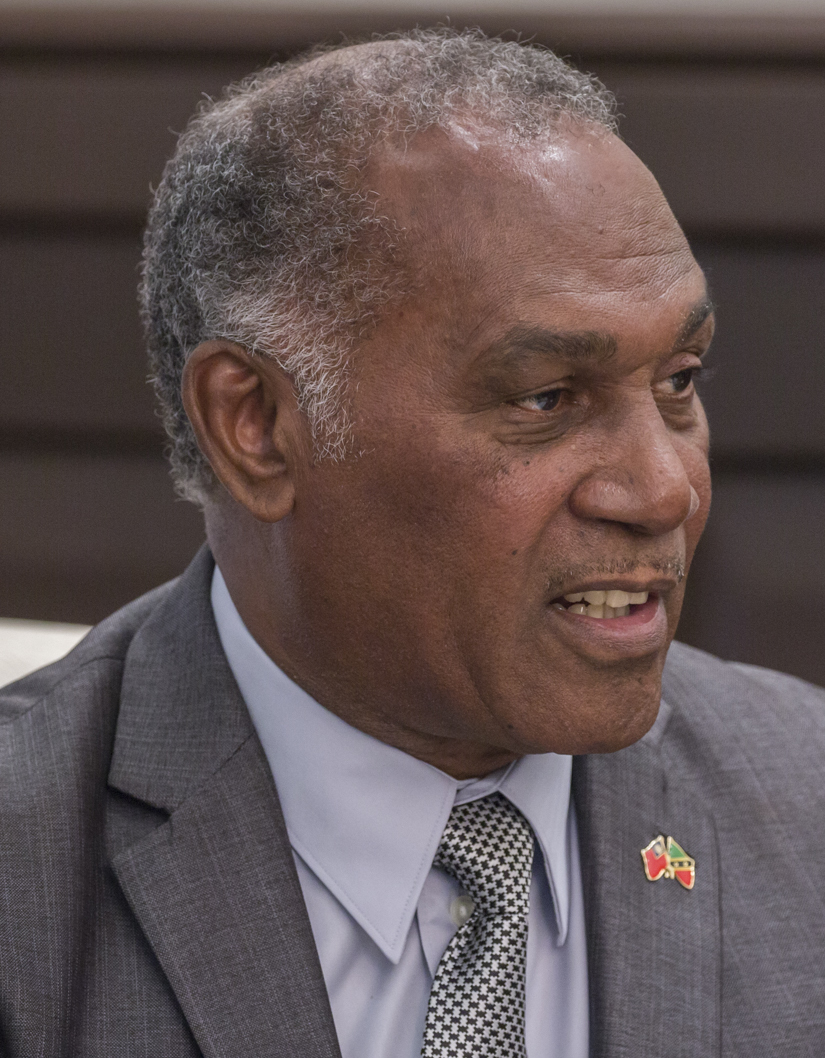
	First party	Second party
Leader	Joseph Parry	Vance Amory
Party	NRP	CCM
Last election	1	4
Seats won	3	2
Seat change	▲2	▼2
Popular vote	2,894	3,050
Percentage	48.69%	51.31%
- Results by constituency.
Premier before election
Vance Amory
CCM
Premier after election
Joseph Parry
NRP

Island Assembly elections were held in Nevis on 10 July 2006 to elect five of the eight members of the Nevis Island Assembly.

The Nevis Reformation Party (NRP), led by Joseph Parry, won control of the chamber for the first time in 15 years by flipping two seats, winning three of the five seats. The ruling party Concerned Citizens' Movement (CCM) won two seats.

== Results ==
District	Incumbent			Results
District	Party	Member	Outcome	Results
1-Saint Paul	CCM	Michael Perkins	Incumbent defeated. NRP gain.	▌ ✓ Robelto Hector (NRP) 664 votes, 51.36%; ▌Michael Perkins (CCM) 629 votes, 48.64%
2-Saint Johns	CCM	Malcolm Guishard	Incumbent defeated. NRP gain.	▌ ✓ Hensley Daniel (NRP) 933 votes, 50.76%; ▌Malcolm Guishard (CCM) 905 votes, 49.24%
3-Saint George	CCM	Vance Amory	Incumbent re-elected.	▌ ✓ Vance Amory (CCM) 730 votes, 70.26%; ▌ Patricia Hanley (NRP) 309 votes, 29.74%
4-Saint James	CCM	Jean Harris	Incumbent re-elected.	▌ ✓ Jean Harris (CCM) 641 votes, 56.47%; ▌Patrice Nisbett (NRP) 494 votes, 43.53%
5-Saint Thomas	NRP	Joseph Parry	Incumbent re-elected.	▌ ✓ Joseph Parry (NRP) 494 votes, 77.31%; ▌Gene Herbert (CCM) 145 votes, 22.69%
