= People's Progressive Movement (Saint Kitts-Nevis-Anguilla) =

The People's Progressive Movement (PPM) was a political party in Saint Kitts-Nevis-Anguilla. The party contested the 1961 general elections with seven candidates, receiving 11% of the vote, but failing to win a seat. They did not contest any further elections. The party was led by former Workers' League politician and prominent lawyer Maurice Davis.
