= Sybil Joyce Hylton =

- Born: Sybil Joyce Russell; 25 August 1913; Cayman Islands
- Died: 1 October 2006 (aged 93); George Town, Grand Cayman, Cayman Islands
- Other names: Joyce Hylton, "Miss Joyce"
- Occupation(s): Social worker, probation officer
- Years active: 1963–1984
- Known for: youth activism
- Spouse: Wilfred Augustus "Conrad" Hylton

Sybil Joyce Hylton MBE (25 August 1913 – 1 October 2006) was a Caymanian community volunteer and social advocate who became involved with the juvenile justice system in the 1950s. She was also known as the "Mother of probation". She lobbied the government to make changes to the way juvenile cases were processed in the court system, helped establish a probation office as well as a juvenile court system, and became the first probation and welfare officer in the country. She was honoured as a recipient of the Order of the British Empire in 1978 and in 2011 was designated as a National Hero of the Cayman Islands.

== Biography ==
Sybil Joyce Russell was born on 25 August 1913 in the Cayman Islands to Edward and Jane Russell. She married Wilfred Augustus "Conrad" Hylton and worked as a community volunteer in youth advocacy, through projects with the Cub Scouts and Lions Club. While attending a court proceeding of a juvenile offender in the 1950s, Hylton was alarmed that the child was being treated by the courts as an adult.

Hylton was not the first to work with juveniles, but she was the first to bring her concerns to the government. Pressing for change in the system, she was instrumental in the passage of several pieces of legislation concerning offenders rights, and was referred to as the "Mother of Probation". The "Probation of Offenders Law 1963" provided for the establishment of probation officers for the island, established codes for adult offenders' supervision, and proscribed the managerial duties for the principal probation officer. Shortly thereafter, Hylton was appointed as the Cayman's Island's first probation officer. Recognizing that troubled youth were usually products of troubled families, Hylton pressed for social services to be added to her position. Soon after, the "Poor Persons' (Relief) Law 1963" was passed and assigned to the Probation Services department. Duties proscribed under the Relief law included an assessment process and funds allocation from the public funds to assist those in reduced financial circumstances or health problems.

She continued pressing for the separation of juvenile justice. In 1964, the Juvenile Offenders' Law was passed. This resulted in the creation of a distinct unit – the Juvenile Court – and legal procedures, including juvenile probation services, which were specifically aimed at administering justice for children aged sixteen and under. The administration of social inquiry reports for both children and adults was supervised by the probation services, which included advice, agency referral, counselling, and filing court reports. In 1974, Gay Jackson was appointed as an assistant to Hylton and Steven E. Smith was hired as a social worker to strengthen the services offered. In 1982, the Probation and Welfare Office was absorbed within the Department of Social Services; Hylton retired subsequently.

Post her retirement, Hylton continued working with the Young Parents Programme and as an adviser to the Adoption Board. She also enjoyed gardening, serving as a member of the Garden Club of Grand Cayman. In 1986, she co-founded the Cayman Orchid Society. Hylton died on 1 October 2006 in George Town, Grand Cayman, Cayman Islands and was buried in the Dixie Cemetery of George Town.

== Honors and awards ==
In 1968, Hylton was honoured with the Cayman Islands Certificate and Badge of Honour and received the designation MBE Order of the British Empire in 1978. In 2011, she was designated as a National Hero of the Cayman Islands and in 2013 was honoured as Youth Services Pioneer, by the Cayman government.
