= United National Empowerment Party =

The United National Empowerment Party was a Saint Kitts-based political party in Saint Kitts and Nevis. Led by Henry Browne, the party contested the 2004 general elections, but received just 263 votes and failed to win a seat. In 2009, the party declared an interest in contesting the next election,, however it later boycotted the 2010 general elections.
