= Saint Kitts and Nevis Trades and Labour Union =

TLU
- Saint Kitts and Nevis Trades and Labour Union
- Founded: 1932
- Headquarters: Basseterre, Saint Kitts and Nevis
- Location: Saint Kitts and Nevis
- Key people: Precious Mills, general secretary
- Affiliations: ITUC

The Saint Kitts and Nevis Trades and Labour Union (TLU) is a general union in St Kitts and Nevis.

== History ==
The union was founded in 1940, following the legalization of trade unions in St Kitts and Nevis. It was initially named the St Kitts - Nevis - Anguilla Trades and Labour Union, and focused on organizing sugar workers. Its founding president was Edgar Challenger. Before the union could register with the government, sugar workers undertook a walk-out, asking for an increase in pay, in view of the increased price of sugar during World War II. The union decided to make the action an official strike. It succeeded in obtain pay increases, but 70 workers were sacked. Despite the mixed success of the action, it was seen as cementing the union's leading role in the country's labour movement.

In 1943, the union organised a ten day general strike, which won a pay increase across many sectors. In 1948, the union led a three-month strike on St Kitts among sugar cane cutters, officially calling for changes to the method of payment, but also making a variety of political demands. The strike was settled by an agreement with the Sugar Producers Association.

The union was a founding affiliate of the International Confederation of Free Trade Unions (ICFTU). Robert Llewellyn Bradshaw succeeded Challenger as president of the union, and he was elected to the ICFTU's executive board. By this point, the union had sections for sugar estate workers, sugar mill workers, waterfront workers, civil servants, and general workers.

== Affiliations ==
The union has a close relationship with the ruling Saint Kitts and Nevis Labour Party (SKNLP) formerly The Workers League. The TLU is affiliated with the International Trade Union Confederation.

== Leadership ==
=== General Secretary ===
- Joseph Nathaniel France, 1940 - 1997
- Batumba Tak, 2003 - 2019
- Precious Mills, 2019 - present
