= Jahnel Nisbett =

Nevisian politician

The Honourable Jahnel Nisbett

Minister of Health, Gender Affairs, Community Affairs and Social Services
- Incumbent
- Assumed office December 2022

Senator of the Nevis Island Assembly
- Incumbent
- Assumed office January 2023

Personal details
- Party: Concerned Citizens' Movement

Mervil Jahnel Nisbett is a Nevisian politician who serves as a cabinet minister in the Nevis Island Administration and a Senator in the Nevis Island Assembly.

== Education ==
Nisbett holds a first-class honours BA degree in History with an Anthropology minor from the University of the West Indies.

== Political career ==
In December 2022, Nisbett was sworn into the Cabinet of the Nevis Island Administration as a Minister with responsibility for Health, Gender Affairs, Community Affairs, and Social Services. She was also confirmed as a Senator in the Nevis Island Assembly, and was formally sworn into office as a nominated member of the Assembly (Senator) in January 2023.
