= Garth Wilkin =

Saint Kitts and Nevis politician

Garth Lucien Wilkin is a politician from Saint Kitts and Nevis who has served as attorney general and minister of justice and legal affairs in the government of Terrance Drew since he came to power in August 2022 after victory in the 2022 Saint Kitts and Nevis general election. Wilkin is a senator.
