= 1937 Saint Kitts-Nevis-Anguilla general election =

General elections were held in Saint Kitts-Nevis-Anguilla on 24 June 1937, the first since the 1870s. The Workers' League nominated two candidates, Thomas Manchester and Edgar Challenger, both of whom were elected.

== Background ==
The St Kitts Legislature was suspended in 1877, after which the colony was ruled by an appointed body. In December 1934 the Legislative Council debated reintroducing elected members, but the idea was rejected. However, following riots in St Kitts the following year, it was decided to restore elected members to the council.

== Electoral system ==
The Council had five elected members, with each island acting as a constituency; St Kitts returned three members, whilst Anguilla and Nevis returned one each. The right to vote was restricted to those over the age of 21 who had an income of at least £30 per annum, owned property with a value of at least £100, paid at least £12 of rent per year, or had paid at least 15 shillings of direct tax in the previous year. As a result, there were a total of 1,629 registered voters; 1,168 in St Kitts, 328 in Nevis and 133 in Anguilla.

== Results ==
Constituency	Candidate	Party	Votes	%	Notes
Anguilla	Albert Elliot Owen		Unopposed		Elected
Nevis	Hubert Henville		188	60.84	Elected
Nevis	T W Deane		121	39.16	
St Kitts	Clermont Malone		934	31.71	Elected
St Kitts	Thomas Manchester	Workers' League	800	27.16	Elected
St Kitts	Edgar Challenger	Workers' League	635	21.56	Elected
St Kitts	W H Walwyn		346	11.75	
St Kitts	P E Ryan		230	7.81	
Total ballots cast			1,312	100	
Registered voters/turnout			1,495	87.76	
Source: O'Flaherty
