= 1940 Saint Kitts-Nevis-Anguilla general election =

General elections were held in Saint Kitts-Nevis-Anguilla on 16 September 1940. The Workers' League won all the elected seats.

== Electoral system ==
The Council had five elected members, with each island acting as a constituency; St Kitts returned three members, whilst Anguilla and Nevis returned one each. The right to vote was restricted to those over the age of 21 who had an income of at least £30 per annum, owned property with a value of at least £100, paid at least £12 of rent per year, or had paid at least 15 shillings of direct tax in the previous year.

== Results ==
Constituency	Candidate	Party	Votes	%	Notes
Anguilla	Albert Elliot Owen		44	53.66	Elected
Anguilla	James Claxton		38	46.34	
Nevis	F Henville		Unopposed		Elected
St Kitts	Edgar Challenger	Workers' League	461	28.96	Elected
St Kitts	Thomas Manchester	Workers' League	444	27.89	Elected
St Kitts	Joseph Matthew Sebastian	Workers' League	371	23.30	Elected
St Kitts	G P Boon		316	19.85	
Source: O'Flaherty
