= Saint Kitts Democratic Party =

The Saint Kitts Democratic Party was a political party in Saint Kitts-Nevis-Anguilla.

== History ==
The party was established in 1949, and was a pro-employer alternative to the Workers League. In the 1957 general elections it received 9% of the vote, but failed to win a seat. They did not contest any further elections.
