= Joseph Matthew Sebastian =

Caribbean trade unionist and politician (1891–1944)

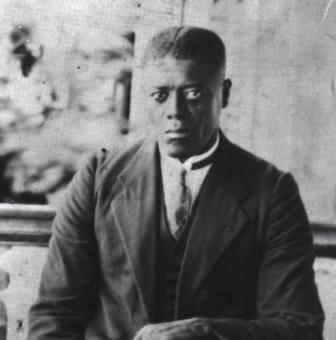
Joseph M. Sebastian

Joseph Matthew Sebastian (7 July 1891 – 25 June 1944) was a Caribbean trade union leader and politician.

== Early life ==
Joseph Matthew Sebastian was born in 1891 in Johnson's Point, in the Parish of St. Mary, Antigua. Following this, he studied to be a teacher. Upon completion of this part of his education, he attended the Mico College in Jamaica from which he graduated first in the class, and with first class honours at the age of 15. He pursued a long career as an educator before he left that profession to pursue the cause of the workers in St. Kitts.

== Family ==
On January 8, 1913, Sebastian married Miss Inez Veronica Hodge, with whom he had 12 children.

In 1995, the only surviving son of Joseph Sebastian, Cuthbert Sebastian, was appointed Governor-General of Saint Kitts and Nevis, being sworn in on January 1, 1996. In 1996, he was knighted by Queen Elizabeth II.

He has one surviving child, Bernice Sebastian (21 September 1913 - 3 January 2026), who became the first person born in Saint Kitts and Nevis to reach age 112 in September 2025.

== Universal Benevolent Association ==
In 1917, Frederick Solomon and George Wilkes returned to St. Kitts from the United States. They were joined by Joseph Alexander Nathan, who had left New York some years earlier. All three had been inspired by Marcus Garvey and started spreading his message of new hope for poor Blacks. Nathan was already established in St. Kitts as a merchant, and he decided to help establish and pioneer a movement whose goal was to eradicate hunger and poverty of the working class, and establish an acceptable standard of living. The three formed the Universal Benevolent Association, which was also responsible for teaching reading, writing, and the rudiments of arithmetic. In addition, the Association encouraged saving and banking, as well as a death benefit plan.

In 1918, Sebastian became the President of the Universal Benevolent Association.

Together, Solomon, Wilkes, and Nathan founded an organization called the Union, which aimed to help the poor, disenfranchised, marginalized, and underprivileged—in particular, those working in the sugar cane fields and at the sugar factory. Solomon was the president, Nathan was the secretary, and Wilkes was the treasurer.

=== The Union Messenger ===
In 1921, the Union acquired its own newspaper, The Union Messenger, which became the mouthpiece for its message of social reform and reconstruction. It was at this point that Sebastian resigned his teaching position to become the newspaper's managing editor, and president of the Union. Before his death, Sebastian bought the rights to the newspaper, and he owned the printing press that was used at The Union Messenger. Upon Sebastian's death, ownership was passed to his widow, Inez Veronica Sebastian, who then allowed the newspaper to continue to use the printing press (in perpetuity) and appointed Joseph Nathaniel France to be editor of The Union Messenger.

Sebastian always put at the top of The Union Messenger, the famous lines from Abraham Lincoln's second Inaugural Address, "With malice towards none, with Charity for all, with firmness in the right." In addition, the following dedication also appeared on every issue of The Union Messenger: "Dedicated to the service of the people, that no good cause shall lack a champion, and that wrong shall not thrive unopposed."

Through The Union Messenger, Sebastian placed special emphasis on the problems faced by the disenfranchised population of St. Kitts and Nevis—housing, health and sanitation, education, and exploitation of children. Sebastian was its editor, and the newspaper exists today as The Labour Spokesman. While some copies exist in private collections, most of Sebastian's editorials were destroyed when the courthouse at East Square Street burned down. The Union Messenger was widely read in the West Indies, the United States, and the United Kingdom.

== Political career ==
In 1932, Sebastian was a founding member of the center-left political party the St Kitts Workers' League (now known as the Saint Kitts and Nevis Labour Party), with Thomas Manchester as president. Sebastian served as a member of its Executive Council.

In 1940, Sebastian was elected to the Legislative Council of Saint Kitts-Nevis-Anguilla and for a second time in 1943. He was also appointed member of the Executive Council of the Leeward Island Colony, which sat in Antigua, which was the headquarters of the Leeward Islands. In addition, Sebastian was elected to the Federal Executive Council of the colony in that same year.

In addition, Sebastian was among those who launched the Trade Union in 1940. That April, the Sugar Factory workers went on strike. Sebastian, seeing the difficulties they were going to have to face, appealed to them to return to work. The response of the workers was very antagonistic; the workers sought out Sebastian with machetes and knives. However, they did not hurt him.

In 1942, Sebastian succeeded Manchester as president of the Workers' League. In 1943, with an impending general strike and following Challenger's resignation from the Union, Sebastian once again found himself at the forefront of the Union leadership. However, Sebastian suddenly died on June 25, 1944.

== Sources ==
- Marthol, Elise Sebastian; Meet My Father : A Short Walk Through the Life of Joseph Matthew Sebastian, July 7, 1993.
- McColman, Dorette; The Sebastians - A Family Portrait April 2000.
- Rogers, Althea C.; Inez and Joseph: A Daughter's Story February 2011.
