= Cuthbert Sebastian =

British Colonial governor

Sir Cuthbert Sebastian GCMG OBE KStJ ED
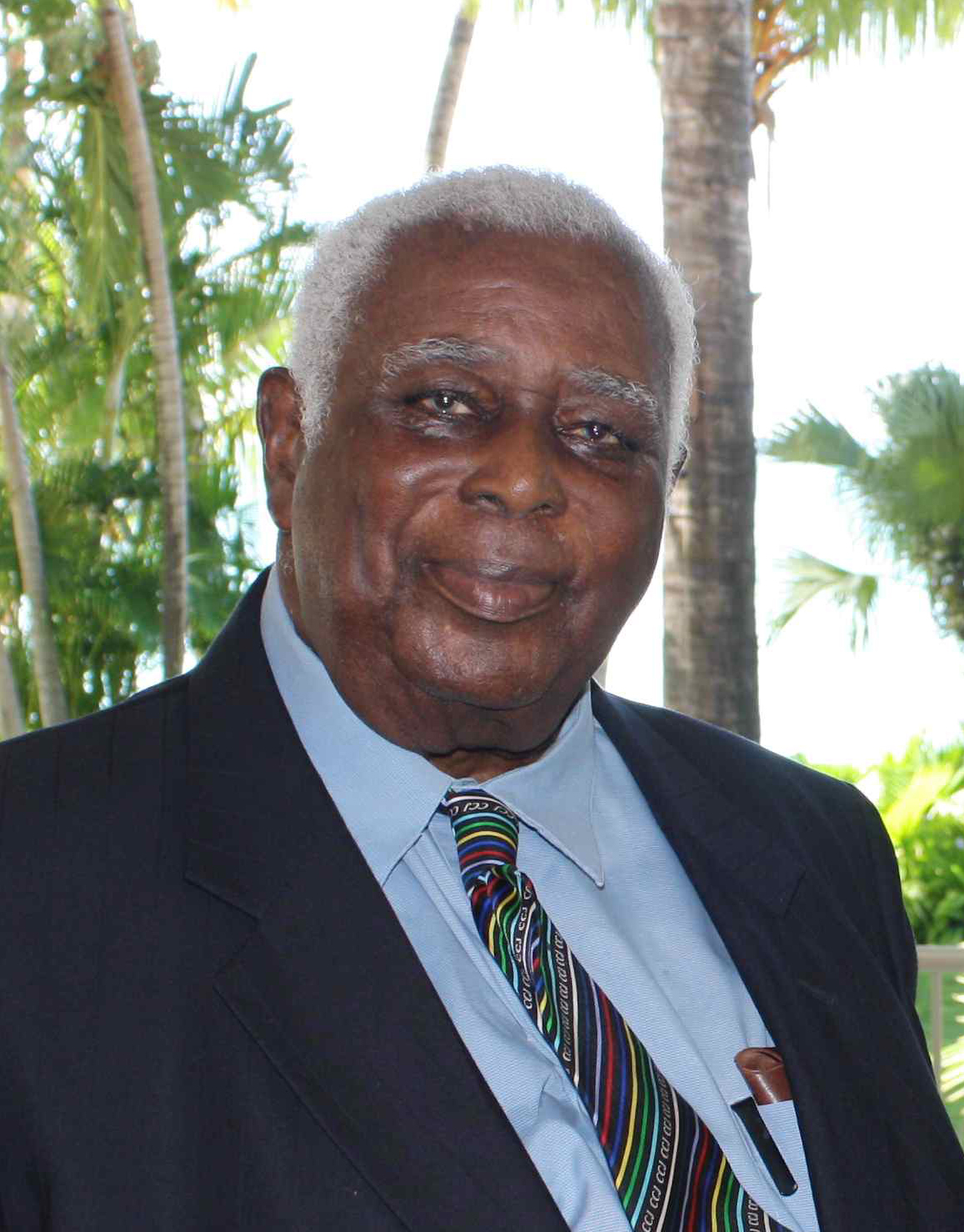
- Cuthbert Sebastian in 2012

2nd Governor-General of Saint Kitts and Nevis
- In office 1 January 1996 – 1 January 2013
- Monarch: Elizabeth II
- Prime Minister: Denzil Douglas
- Preceded by: Clement Arrindell
- Succeeded by: Edmund Lawrence

Personal details
- Born: Cuthbert Montraville Sebastian; 22 October 1921 Basseterre, British Leeward Islands
- Died: 25 March 2017 (aged 95) Basseterre, Saint Kitts and Nevis
- Parent(s): Joseph Matthew Sebastian; Inez Veronica Sebastian (née Hodge)
- Education: Mount Allison University; Dalhousie University; Dundee Royal Infirmary

Sir Cuthbert Montraville Sebastian GCMG OBE KStJ ED (22 October 1921 – 25 March 2017) was the second governor-general of Saint Kitts and Nevis from 1996 to 2013. He was appointed Governor-General in 1995 and was sworn in on 1 January 1996. While in office, he was the world's oldest serving de facto head of state. His retirement was announced on 25 December 2012 and became effective on 1 January 2013.

== Life and career ==
Sebastian was born on October 22, 1921, in Basseterre, St Kitts. Sebastian was the son of Joseph Matthew Sebastian, who was a Member of the Legislative and Executive Councils of Saint Christopher-Nevis-Anguilla until his death in 1944, and Inez Veronica Sebastian (née Hodge). He studied at Mount Allison University, New Brunswick, where he obtained a BSc degree. He entered Dalhousie University in Halifax, Nova Scotia, where he studied medicine and graduated, in 1958, with a MDCM degree to become a surgeon.

He served in St. Kitts, Nevis and Anguilla as pupil teacher, learner/dispenser, chemist and druggist, laboratory technician, senior dispenser, medical superintendent and obstetrician–gynaecologist. He was Chief Medical Officer of St. Kitts and Nevis from 1980 to 1983. From 1962 to 1966, he pursued training at the Dundee Royal Infirmary, Scotland in obstetrics and gynaecology.

Sebastian was a rear gunner during World War II in the Royal Canadian Air Force, Captain (Surgeon) in the St. Kitts-Nevis Defence Force, local physician to His Royal Highness the Prince of Wales (Prince Charles), when His Highness visited St. Kitts in 1973 (the Prince of Wales visited the island to open the newly restored Prince of Wales Bastion, 1 June). In addition, he was ADC to the Saint Christopher-Nevis-Anguilla Premier, Robert Llewellyn Bradshaw, when Bradshaw went to Buckingham Palace on the occasion of Her Majesty's 25th year on the Throne.

Sebastian received the Auxiliary Forces (Officer's) Efficiency Decoration (ED), and was made an Officer of Order of the British Empire (OBE) (civil division) from Queen Elizabeth II in 1969. He was knighted as a Knight Grand Cross of the Most Distinguished Order of St Michael and St George in 1996, and was made a Knight of Grace of the Most Venerable Order of St John of Jerusalem (KStJ). Dalhousie University honoured him with an Honorary Doctorate of Laws, in 1998, and in 2005 he received an Honorary Doctorate from Mount Allison University. On 5 July 2002, he received an Honorary Fellowship of the Royal College of Surgeons (FRCS) of Edinburgh in Scotland, for his outstanding career and service to humanity in the field of medicine. Prior to Edinburgh, he received an FRCS in London. In 2005 the College of Arms granted him his personal coat of arms.

On 3 March 2012 Sebastian welcomed the Earl and Countess of Wessex to St Kitts and Nevis during their visit to the Caribbean as part of Diamond Jubilee of Elizabeth II.

On 1 January 2013 Sebastian retired as Governor-general of St Kitts and Nevis. There was a retirement ceremony, during which he made a speech.

Sebastian died at his home, in St Kitts, on 25 March 2017 at the age of 95.

== See also ==
- List of national leaders

Government offices
Preceded by Clement Arrindell	Governor General of Saint Kitts and Nevis; 1996–2013	Succeeded by Edmund Lawrence
