= 1961 Saint Kitts-Nevis-Anguilla general election =

General elections were held in Saint Kitts-Nevis-Anguilla on 16 November 1961. The result was a victory for the Saint Kitts-Nevis-Anguilla Labour Party, which won seven of the ten elected seats.

== Background ==
A new constitution came into force on 1 January 1960, providing for a 13-member Legislative Council with ten elected members, two nominated members and one ex officio member, the Crown Law Officer.

== Results ==
| Party | Votes | % | Seats | +/– |
|---|---|---|---|---|
| Saint Kitts-Nevis-Anguilla Labour Party | 7,808 | 64.48 | 7 | +2 |
| People's Progressive Movement | 1,346 | 11.12 | 0 | New |
| United National Movement | 876 | 7.23 | 2 | New |
| Independents | 2,079 | 17.17 | 1 | –2 |
| Appointed members | | | 3 | –3 |
| Total | 12,109 | 100.00 | 13 | –1 |
| Valid votes | 12,109 | 96.19 | | |
| Invalid/blank votes | 479 | 3.81 | | |
| Total votes | 12,588 | 100.00 | | |
| Registered voters/turnout | 18,310 | 68.75 | | |
Source: Nohlen, O'Flaherty
