= Lee Moore (politician) =

Sir Lee Moore KCMG

3rd Premier of Saint Kitts and Nevis
- In office 20 May 1979 – 21 February 1980
- Monarch: Elizabeth II
- Governor: Probyn Inniss
- Deputy: Charles Egbert Mills
- Preceded by: Paul Southwell
- Succeeded by: Kennedy Simmonds

Personal details
- Born: Lee Llewellyn Moore; 15 February 1939
- Died: 6 May 2000 (aged 61)
- Party: Saint Kitts and Nevis Labour Party
- Education: King's College London

Sir Lee Llewellyn Moore KCMG (15 February 1939 – 6 May 2000) served as Premier of Saint Kitts and Nevis from 20 May 1979 to 21 February 1980. He was a member of the Saint Kitts and Nevis Labour Party. He graduated with an LLB from King's College London, and later earned an LLM and a Diploma in Theology.

Lee became an aide to Premier Robert Llewellyn Bradshaw in 1967, and was appointed attorney general in 1971. He became Deputy Premier in the cabinet of Paul Southwell. When Southwell died, Lee became Premier in 1979 but lost in the 1980 general election. He remained as leader of the opposition until 1984, when he lost his seat in the National Assembly. In 1989 he resigned from Labour party leadership.

Moore was appointed Knight Commander of the Order of St Michael and St George (KCMG) in the 2000 New Year Honours, for services to legal, social and economic development of The Federation and the region.

In 2004, a court building on Independence Square in Basseterre was named the 'Sir Lee Llewellyn Moore, KCMG, Q.C., Judicial and Legal Services Complex' in his honour.

Political offices
Preceded by Paul Southwell	Premier of Saint Kitts and Nevis; 1979–1980	Succeeded by Kennedy Simmonds
