= 1957 Saint Kitts-Nevis-Anguilla general election =

General elections were held in Saint Kitts-Nevis-Anguilla on 6 November 1957. The result was a victory for the Saint Kitts-Nevis-Anguilla Labour Party, which won five of the eight seats.

== Results ==
Party	Votes	%	Seats	+/–
Saint Kitts-Nevis-Anguilla Labour Party	5,270	53.60	5	–2
Saint Kitts Democratic Party	905	9.20	0	0
Nevis People's Party	196	1.99	0	New
Independents	3,462	35.21	3	+2
Non-elected members			6	0
Total	9,833	100.00	14	0
Source: Caribbean Elections
