= 1993 Saint Kitts and Nevis general election =

- 29 November 1993

11 of 15 seats in the National Assembly 6 seats needed for a majority
- Registered: 28,875
- Turnout: 66.68% (▲0.13pp)
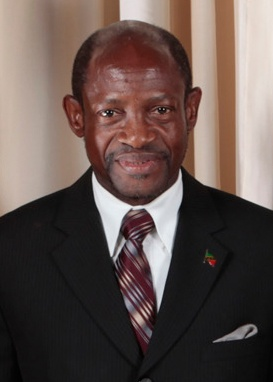

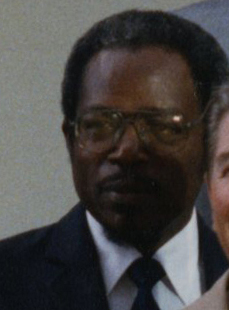

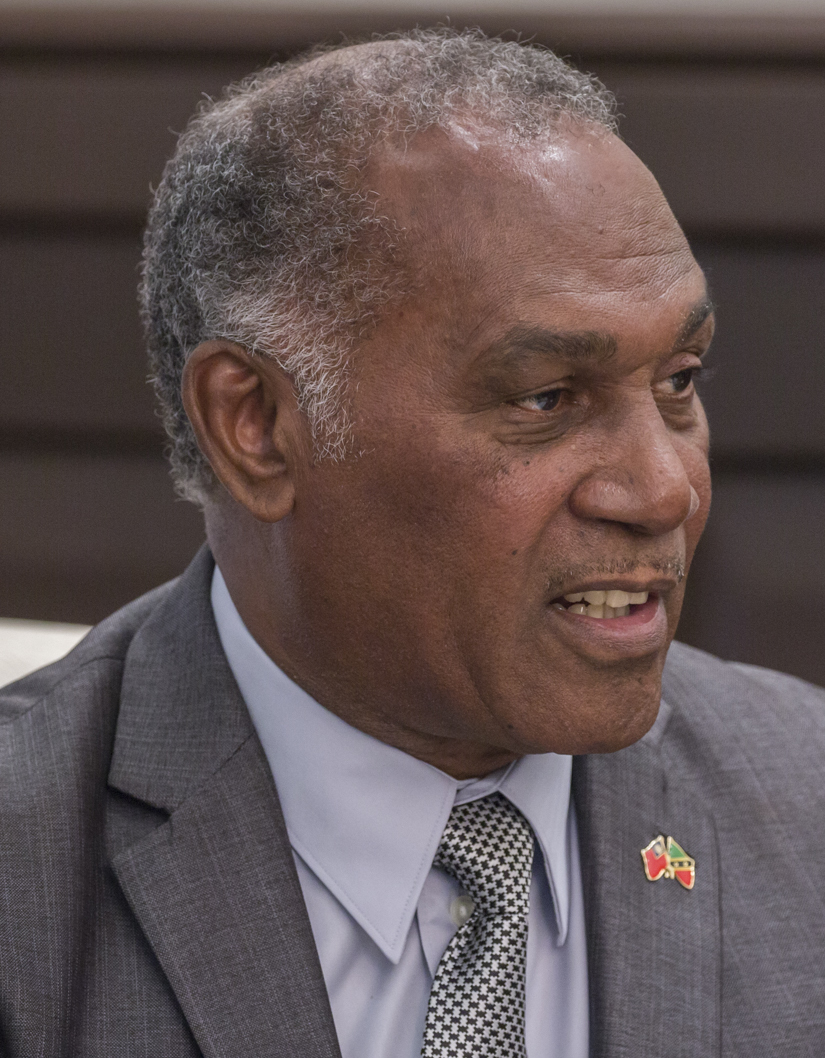

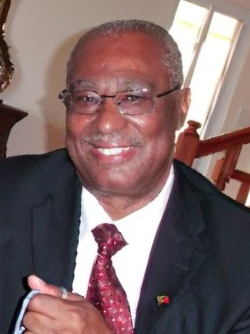
	First party	Second party
Leader	Denzil Douglas	Kennedy Simmonds
Party	SKNLP	PAM
Last election	37.84%, 2 seats	44.37%, 4 seats
Seats won	4	4
Seat change	▲2	▼2
Popular vote	8,405	6,449
Percentage	43.78%	33.59%
Swing	▲5.94pp	▼10.78pp
	Third party	Fourth party
Leader	Vance Amory	Joseph Parry
Party	CCM	NRP
Last election	6.47%, 1 seats	11.11%, 2 seat
Seats won	2	1
Seat change	▲1	▼1
Popular vote	2,097	1,641
Percentage	10.92%	8.55%
Swing	▲4.45pp	▼2.56pp
- Results by constituency
Prime Minister before election
Kennedy Simmonds
PAM
Elected Prime Minister
Kennedy Simmonds
PAM

General elections were held in Saint Kitts and Nevis on 29 November 1993. No party won a majority, and although the Saint Kitts and Nevis Labour Party received the most votes, the People's Action Movement remained in power in a minority cabinet in coalition with Nevis Reformation Party.

== Results ==
Party	Votes	%	Seats	+/–
Saint Kitts and Nevis Labour Party	8,405	43.78	4	+2
People's Action Movement	6,449	33.59	4	–2
Concerned Citizens' Movement	2,097	10.92	2	+1
Nevis Reformation Party	1,641	8.55	1	–1
United People's Party	605	3.15	0	New
Independents	1	0.01	0	New
Appointed members			4	0
Total	19,198	100.00	15	0
Valid votes	19,198	99.71		
Invalid/blank votes	55	0.29		
Total votes	19,253	100.00		
Registered voters/turnout	28,875	66.68		
Source: Caribbean Elections
