= 1995 Saint Kitts and Nevis general election =

- 3 July 1995

11 of 15 seats in the National Assembly 6 seats needed for a majority
- Registered: 31,724
- Turnout: 68.38% (▲1.70pp)
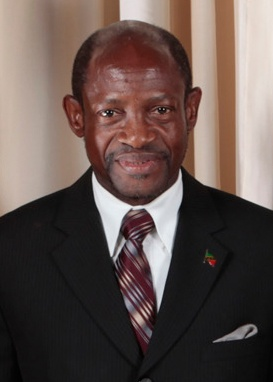

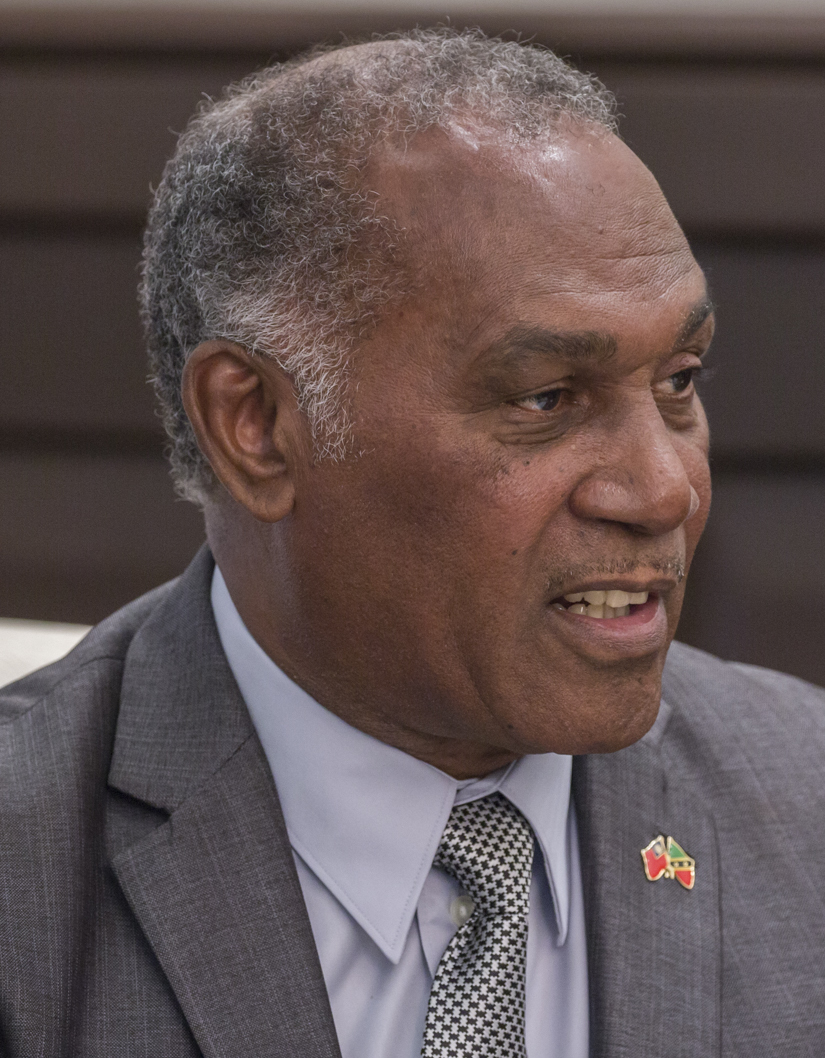

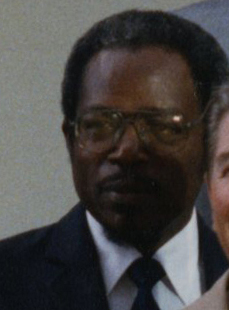

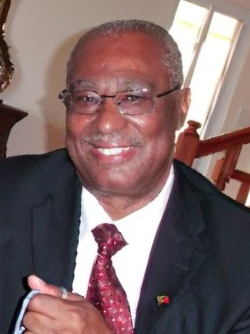
	First party	Second party
Leader	Denzil Douglas	Vance Amory
Party	SKNLP	CCM
Last election	43.78%, 4 seats	10.92%, 2 seats
Seats won	7	2
Seat change	▲3	Steady
Popular vote	10,722	1,777
Percentage	49.58%	8.22%
Swing	▲5.80pp	▼2.70pp
	Third party	Fourth party
Leader	Kennedy Simmonds	Joseph Parry
Party	PAM	NRP
Last election	33.59%, 4 seats	8.55%, 1 seat
Seats won	1	1
Seat change	▼3	Steady
Popular vote	7,350	1,521
Percentage	34.82%	7.03%
Swing	▲1.23pp	▼1.52pp
- Results by constituency
Prime Minister before election
Kennedy Simmonds
PAM
Elected Prime Minister
Denzil Douglas
SKNLP

General elections were held in Saint Kitts and Nevis on 3 July 1995. The result was a victory for the Saint Kitts and Nevis Labour Party, which won seven of the eleven directly elected seats. Voter turnout was 68%.

== Results ==
Party	Votes	%	Seats	+/–
Saint Kitts and Nevis Labour Party	10,722	49.58	7	+3
People's Action Movement	7,530	34.82	1	–3
Concerned Citizens' Movement	1,777	8.22	2	0
Nevis Reformation Party	1,521	7.03	1	0
United People's Party	71	0.33	0	0
Independents	3	0.01	0	0
Appointed members			4	0
Total	21,624	100.00	15	0
Valid votes	21,624	99.69		
Invalid/blank votes	68	0.31		
Total votes	21,692	100.00		
Registered voters/turnout	31,724	68.38		
Source: Caribbean Elections
