= Nevis Island Administration =

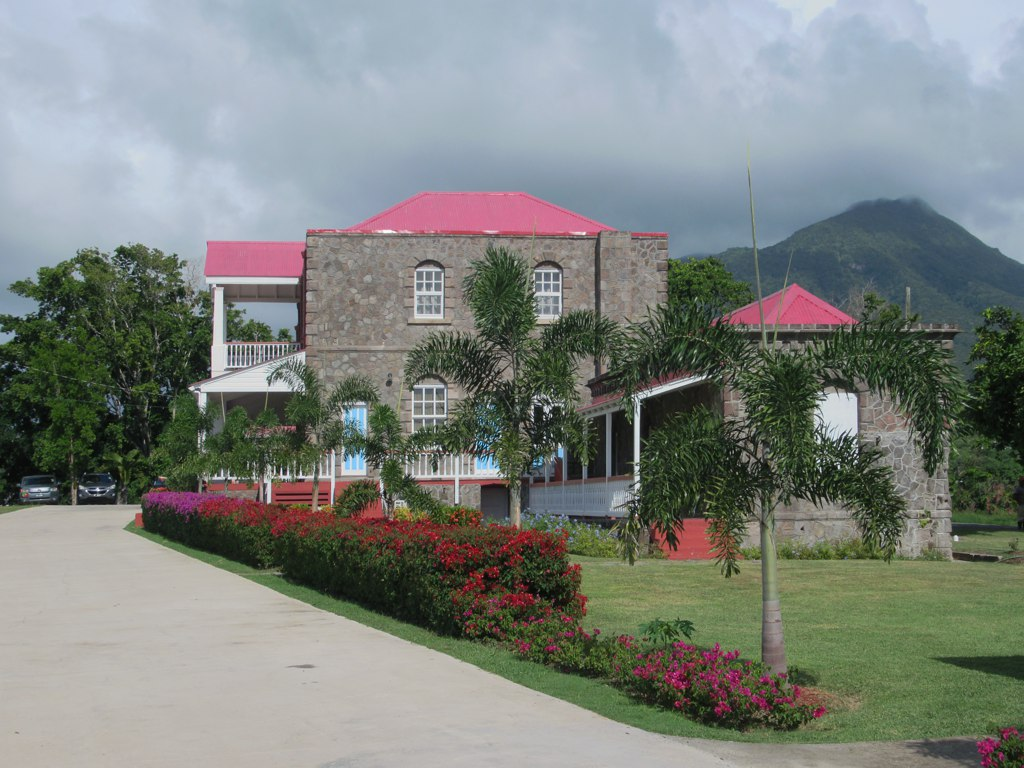
Government House, Charlestown, Nevis

The Nevis Island Administration is the government of the island of Nevis within the Federation of St Kitts and Nevis.

== Ministers ==
The ministers within the Nevis Island Administration are as follows:

Name	Portfolios
Mark Brantley	Premier of Nevis and Minister of Finance, Statistics, Economic Planning, Human Resources, Industry, Trade and Consumer Affairs, Tourism, Public Utilities and Energy, Foreign Investments, Government Information Service and Nevis Television.
Eric Evelyn	Deputy Premier and Minister of Agriculture, Lands, Natural Resources, Fisheries, Cooperatives, Culture and Housing.
Spencer Brand	Minister of Communications, Works, Water Services, Physical Planning and Environment, Posts, Labour and Disaster.
Jahnel Nisbett	Junior Minister with responsibility for Health, Gender Affairs, Community Affairs and Social Empowerment
Troy Liburd	Junior Minister with responsibility for Education, Information Technology, Library Services, Youth and Sports.
Stedmon Tross	Cabinet Secretary
Helene Lewis	Legal Advisor

== See also ==
- Nevis Island Assembly
