= 2004 Saint Kitts and Nevis general election =

- 24 October 2004

11 of 15 seats in the National Assembly 6 seats needed for a majority
- Registered: 38,865
- Turnout: 58.51% (▼5.73pp)
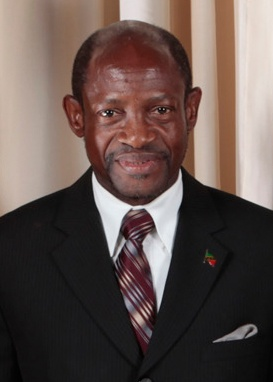

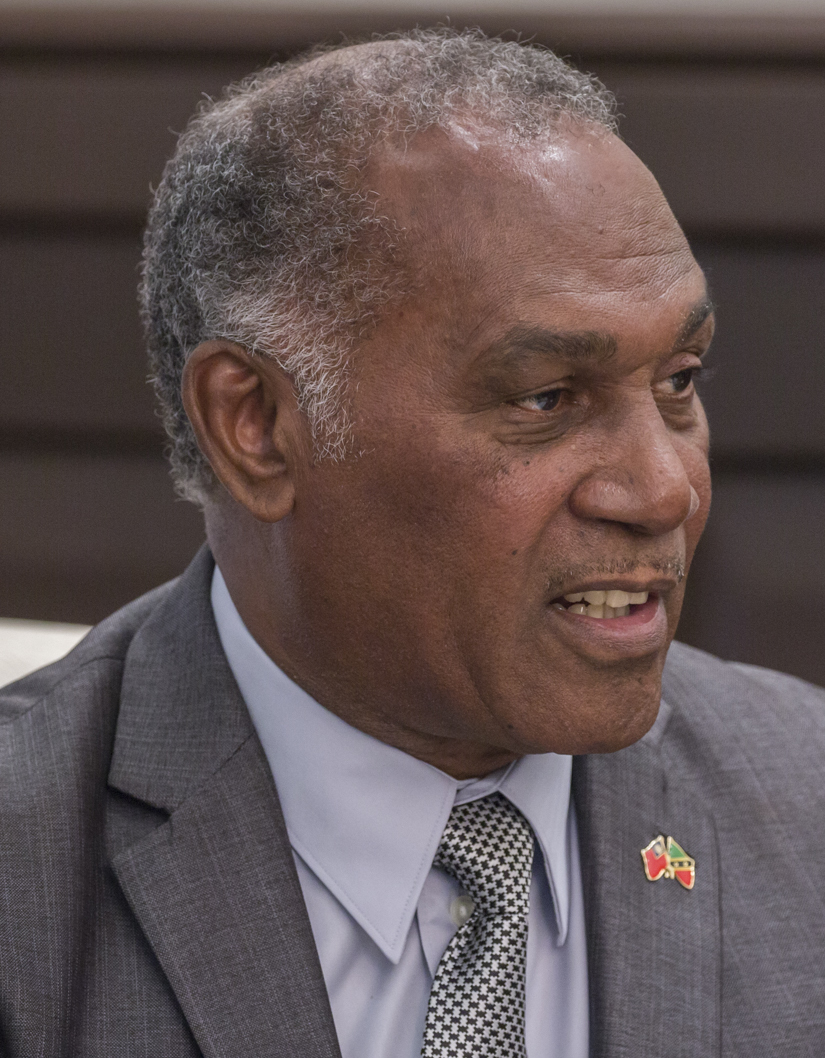

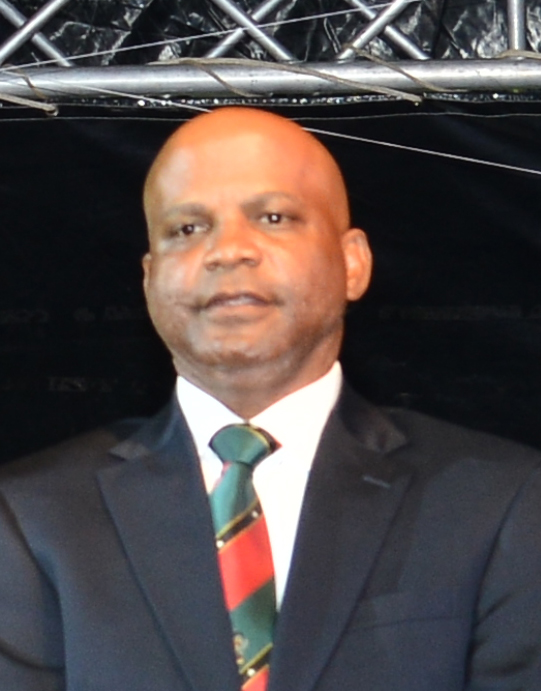

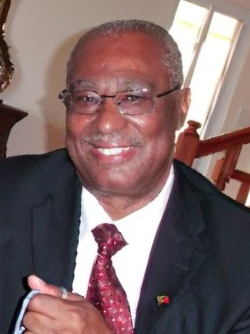
	First party	Second party
Leader	Denzil Douglas	Vance Amory
Party	SKNLP	CCM
Last election	53.85%, 8 seats	8.70%, 2 seats
Seats won	7	2
Seat change	▼1	Steady
Popular vote	11,427	1,982
Percentage	50.61%	8.78%
Swing	▼3.24pp	▲0.08pp
	Third party	Fourth party
Leader	Lindsay Grant	Joseph Parry
Party	PAM	NRP
Last election	29.61%, 0 seats	7.83%, 1 seat
Seats won	1	1
Seat change	▲1	Steady
Popular vote	8,393	1,710
Percentage	31.71%	7.48%
Swing	▲2.10pp	▼0.35pp
- Results by constituency
Prime Minister before election
Denzil Douglas
SKNLP
Elected Prime Minister
Denzil Douglas
SKNLP

General elections were held in Saint Kitts and Nevis on 24 October 2004. The result was a victory for the Saint Kitts and Nevis Labour Party, which received over 50% of the vote and won seven of the eleven directly elected seats in the National Assembly.

== Results ==
Party	Votes	%	Seats	+/–
Saint Kitts and Nevis Labour Party	11,427	50.61	7	–1
People's Action Movement	7,160	31.71	1	+1
Concerned Citizens' Movement	1,982	8.78	2	0
Nevis Reformation Party	1,688	7.48	1	0
United National Empowerment Party	253	1.12	0	New
Independents	70	0.31	0	New
Appointed members			4	0
Total	22,580	100.00	15	0
Valid votes	22,580	99.30		
Invalid/blank votes	159	0.70		
Total votes	22,739	100.00		
Registered voters/turnout	38,865	58.51		
Source: Caribbean Elections
