= Drew ministry (Saint Kitts and Nevis) =

The Drew ministry has governed Saint Kitts and Nevis since August 2022. It was formed by Prime Minister Terrance Drew after victory in the 2022 Saint Kitts and Nevis general election.

== Ministers ==
The government was sworn in on 15 August 2022.

- Geoffrey Hanley - Deputy Prime Minister
- Marsha Henderson - Minister of Tourism, Civil Aviation, and Urban Development
- Konris Maynard - Minister of public infrastructure and utilities, transport, information, communication and technology, and post
- Samal Duggins - Minister of agriculture, fisheries, creative economy, entrepreneurship, marine resources, and cooperatives
- Denzil Douglas - Minister of Foreign Affairs
- Garth Wilkin - attorney general and minister of justice and legal affairs
- Joyelle Clarke will be responsible for sustainable development, climate action, constituency empowerment, and environment
- Isalean Philip was sworn in as a senator
