= Paul Southwell =

St Kitts & Nevis politician (1913-1979)

The Right Excellent Paul Southwell
- Southwell at the funeral of Robert Llewellyn Bradshaw in 1978

2nd Premier of Saint Kitts and Nevis
- In office 23 May 1978 – 18 May 1979
- Monarch: Elizabeth II
- Governor: Probyn Inniss
- Deputy: Lee Moore
- Preceded by: Robert Llewellyn Bradshaw
- Succeeded by: Lee Moore

1st Chief Minister of Saint Kitts and Nevis
- In office 1 January 1960 – July 1966
- Monarch: Elizabeth II
- Administrator: Henry Howard
- Preceded by: Office established
- Succeeded by: Robert Llewellyn Bradshaw

Minister of Finance
- In office January 1960 – May 1979
- Succeeded by: Charles E. Mills

Personal details
- Born: Caleb Azariah Paul Southwell; 18 July 1913 British Dominica (Now Dominica)
- Died: 18 May 1979 (aged 65) Castries, Saint Lucia
- Party: Labour Party (1946–1979)

Caleb Azariah Paul Southwell (18 July 1913 – 18 May 1979) was the second Premier and first Chief Minister of Saint Kitts and Nevis in the Caribbean. He also worked as a teacher, police officer, and trade unionist.

== Early life and career ==
Southwell was born in Dominica on 18 July 1913 to Joseph and Amelia Southwell. At 13 years of age, Southwell became a teacher and later joined the Leeward Islands Police Force in 1938. He served in Antigua, Montserrat, Saint Kitts and Nevis, and Anguilla until he retired from the force in 1944.

In 1944, Southwell became an employee of the Saint Kitts Sugar Factory where he worked as a timekeeper and assistant stock clerk until the end of the sugar factory workers strike in 1948. Southwell joined the St. Kitts and Nevis Trades and Labour Union and Saint Kitts and Nevis Workers League (now the Saint Kitts and Nevis Labour Party) in 1946 and remained vice president of the Union from 1946 until his death.

== Political career ==
First elected to the Saint Kitts-Nevis-Anguilla Legislative Council in 1952, Southwell was appointed to the Executive Council in 1955 and served as the First Minister of Communications and Works in 1956. Southwell was appointed as the first Chief Minister of Saint Kitts-Nevis-Anguilla in 1960. He was later appointed Deputy Premier and Minister of Finance, Trade, Development, Industry and Tourism in several Robert Llewellyn Bradshaw administrations from 1967-1978, and assumed the position of full Premier on the death of Bradshaw on 23 May 1978.

== Death ==
Southwell died of a heart disease on 18 May 1979, less than one year after becoming Premier, in Castries, Saint Lucia. The death occurred during a meeting of the West Indies Associated States Council of Ministers. He was succeeded by his Deputy Premier, Lee Moore.

== Legacy ==
The Industrial Park in St. Kitts was named in his honor.

Political offices
Preceded by New office - replacing the Administrator of Saint Kitts and Nevis Henry Howard	Chief Minister of Saint Kitts and Nevis; 1960–1966	Succeeded by Robert Llewellyn Bradshaw
Preceded by Robert Llewellyn Bradshaw	Premier of Saint Kitts and Nevis; 1978–1979	Succeeded by Lee Moore
