= Order of the National Hero (Belize) =

Highest honor of Belize

- Type: Order
- Awarded for: "Extraordinary and outstanding achievement and merit in service to Belize or to humanity at large."
- Presented by: Belize
- Status: Currently constituted
- Established: 16 August 1991
- First award: 2000
- Final award: 2009

Highlights
- Total: 2
- Total recipients: 2

Precedence
- Next (higher): None
- Next (lower): Order of Belize

The Order of the National Hero is the highest honour awarded by the government of Belize. As stipulated by the National Honours and Awards Act, 1991, instituted on 16 August 1991, it is bestowed for "extraordinary and outstanding achievement and merit in service to Belize or to humanity at large." It can be awarded posthumously. The act was revised in 2000.

The act states that the name of the recipient is to published in the Belize Government Gazette. The award is generally bestowed on Belize's Independence Day, 21 September, but can be conferred at other times.

There have been two recipients: George Cadle Price (1919–2011), in September 2000; and Philip Goldson (1923–2001), posthumously in September 2008.

Price co-founded the People's United Party (PUP) in 1950 and became its leader in 1956. He served the British in what was then British Honduras, as a member of the Legislative Council, mayor of Belize City (1956–1962), First Minister from 1961 and Premier from 1964. He is considered "one of the principal architects of that country's independence" and, as the head of the government prior to independence, served as Belize's first prime minister.

Goldson was a newspaper editor, politician and a founding member of both of Belize's current major political parties, the People's United Party (established on 29 September 1950) and the United Democratic Party (established on 27 September 1973), as well as the now-defunct National Independence Party (NIP). He served as Party Secretary upon NIP's inception in 1957, then as its leader from 1961 to 1974.
