= Robert Llewellyn Bradshaw =

Saint Kitts and Nevis politician

The Right Excellent Robert Llewellyn Bradshaw

1st Premier of Saint Kitts and Nevis
- In office 27 February 1967 – 23 May 1978
- Monarch: Elizabeth II
- Governor: Frederick Albert Phillips; Milton Allen; Probyn Inniss
- Deputy: Paul Southwell
- Preceded by: Office Established (Himself as Chief Minister)
- Succeeded by: Paul Southwell

2nd Chief Minister of Saint Kitts and Nevis
- In office July 1966 – 26 February 1967
- Monarch: Elizabeth II
- Administrator: Frederick Albert Phillips
- Preceded by: Paul Southwell
- Succeeded by: Office Abolished (Himself as Premier)

Personal details
- Born: 16 September 1916 Saint Paul Capisterre, Saint Kitts, Saint Christopher-Nevis-Anguilla
- Died: 23 May 1978 (aged 61) Basseterre, Saint Kitts
- Resting place: Springfield Cemetery, Basseterre
- Party: Labour Party (1946–1978)
- Spouse: Mildred Bradshaw

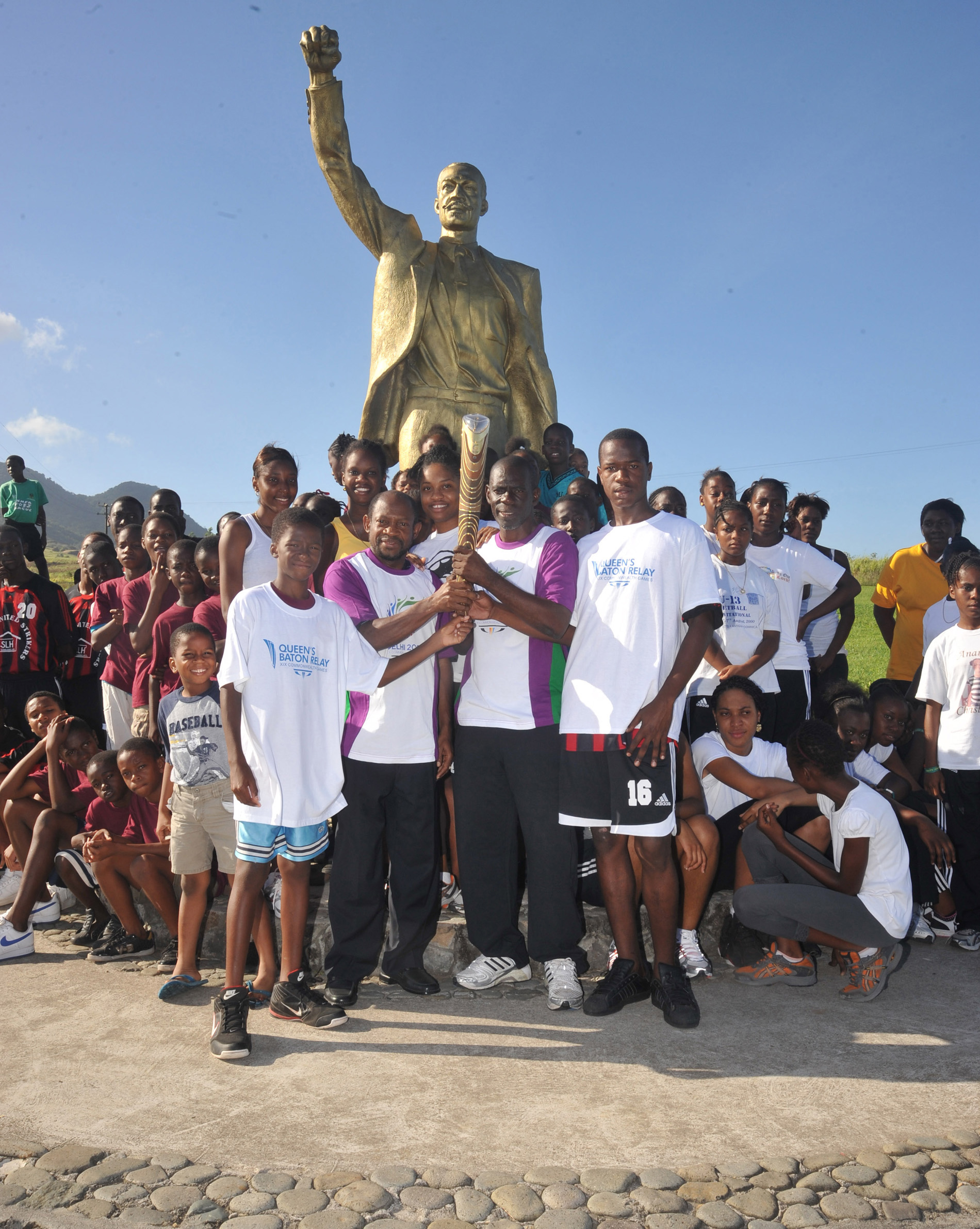
Monument of Robert Llewellyn Bradshaw

Robert Llewellyn Bradshaw (16 September 1916 – 23 May 1978) was the first Premier of Saint Kitts and Nevis, and previously served as Chief Minister, legislator, and labour activist.

== Early life ==
Bradshaw was born in the Saint Paul Capisterre Village in Saint Kitts to Mary Jane Francis, a domestic servant, and William Bradshaw, a blacksmith. He was raised by his grandmother after his father moved to the United States when Bradshaw was nine months old. He attended St. Paul's Primary School and completed seventh grade, the highest level of primary education available in Saint Kitts at the time.

At 16, Bradshaw became a machine apprentice at the St. Kitts Sugar Factory, where he began to take interest in the labour movement. In 1940, he left the sugar factory following a strike for higher wages and joined the St. Kitts and Nevis Trades and Labour Union as a clerk. Bradshaw succeeded Joseph Matthew Sebastian as president of the union in 1944.

In 1963 he married Mildred Sahaley, a Kittitian-Lebanese woman. They had one daughter, Isis Carla Bradshaw. His first daughter, Etsu, is from an earlier relationship.

== Political career ==
Bradshaw supported the cause of the sugar workers and was one of the political stalwarts of the country. In 1945 he became president of the recently created St Kitts-Nevis-Anguilla Labour Party. He entered politics in 1946 and won a seat in the Legislative Council in the elections that year, later becoming a member of the Executive Council. In 1956 he was Minister of Trade and Production for St. Kitts-Nevis-Anguilla. During the short-lived West Indies Federation (from 1958 to 1962), Bradshaw was elected to the Federal House of Representatives and held the post of minister of finance for the West Indies Federation.

After the break-up of the Federation, Bradshaw returned to St. Kitts from Trinidad. In 1966 he became Chief Minister, and in 1967 the first Premier of St. Kitts-Nevis-Anguilla, then an associated state of the United Kingdom. Under his leadership, all sugar lands, as well as the central sugar factory, were bought by the government. Opposition to Bradshaw's rule began to build. Opposition was especially great in Nevis, where it was felt that the island was being neglected and unfairly deprived of revenue, investment and services by its larger neighbour. Bradshaw mainly ignored Nevis' complaints, but Nevisian disenchantment with the Labour Party proved a key factor in the party's eventual fall from power. Opposition in Anguilla was even stronger, with the Anguillans evicting St. Kitts police from their island and holding referendums in 1967 and 1969, both times voting overwhelmingly to secede from St. Kitts-Nevis and remain a separate British territory.

In 1977 Bradshaw travelled to London for talks on independence with the British government.

== Death ==
Bradshaw died on 23 May 1978 of prostate cancer at his home in Basseterre. He was succeeded by his Deputy Premier, Paul Southwell. He is buried in Springfield cemetery in Basseterre.

== Legacy ==
In 1996, Bradshaw was posthumously awarded the title of First National Hero by the National Assembly of Saint Kitts and Nevis and is honoured annually on National Heroes Day, which is observed on his birthday. On the inaugural National Heroes Day in 1998, the Golden Rock Airport in Saint Kitts was renamed the Robert L. Bradshaw International Airport in his honor. In 2007, the Robert Llewellyn Bradshaw Memorial Park was dedicated at his birthplace in St. Paul's. On 17 September 2010, the Robert Llewellyn Bradshaw building was dedicated on the Windsor University School of Medicine campus in Cayon.

Political offices
| Preceded by Paul Southwell | Chief Minister of Saint Kitts and Nevis; 1966–1967 | Succeeded by himself as Premier |
| Preceded by himself as Chief Minister | Premier of Saint Kitts and Nevis; 1967–1978 | Succeeded by Paul Southwell |
