= Kennedy Simmonds =

Prime Minister of Saint Kitts and Nevis from 1983 to 1995

The Right Excellent Sir Kennedy Simmonds KCMG
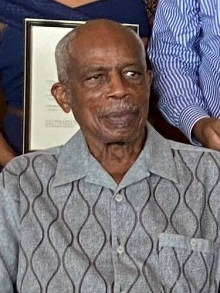
- Simmonds in 2020

1st Prime Minister of Saint Kitts and Nevis
- In office 19 September 1983 – 7 July 1995
- Monarch: Elizabeth II
- Governor-General: Clement Arrindell
- Deputy: Michael Oliver Powell; Sydney Earl Morris; Hugh Heyliger
- Preceded by: Office Established (Himself as Premier)
- Succeeded by: Denzil Douglas

4th Premier of Saint Kitts and Nevis
- In office 21 February 1980 – 19 September 1983
- Monarch: Elizabeth II
- Governor: Probyn Inniss; Clement Arrindell
- Deputy: Michael Oliver Powell
- Preceded by: Lee Moore
- Succeeded by: Office Abolished (Himself as Prime Minister)

Minister of Finance of Saint Kitts and Nevis
- In office 1984 – July 1995
- Preceded by: Richard Llewellyn Caines
- Succeeded by: Denzil Douglas

Personal details
- Born: Kennedy Alphonse Simmonds; 12 April 1936 (age 90) Basseterre, Saint Kitts and Nevis
- Party: People's Action Movement
- Education: University of the West Indies

Sir Kennedy Alphonse Simmonds, KCMG (born 12 April 1936), is a Saint Kittitian and Nevisian politician who served as the first prime minister of Saint Kitts and Nevis from 1983 to 1995.

== Life and career ==
Simmonds was born in Basseterre on 12 April 1936. He graduated as a physician from the University of the West Indies in 1962. He married Mary Matthew, and they had five children.

Simmonds was a founding member of the People's Action Movement (PAM) party. He was the Premier of Saint Kitts and Nevis from 21 February 1980, until the twin-island state gained independence from the United Kingdom on 19 September 1983. Upon independence, he became the 1st Prime Minister of Saint Kitts and Nevis and as such has been described as "The Father of the Nation."

Simmonds and his party ruled with the support of Nevis Reformation Party. He had three deputy prime ministers: Michael Oliver Powell 1980-1992, Sydney Earl Morris 1992-1994 and Hugh Heyliger 1994-1995.

== Honours ==
In 2004, Simmonds was made a Knight Commander of the Order of St Michael and St George. In 2015, Simmonds became the fifth person to be named as a National Hero by the National Assembly. He is the first living person to receive this honour. In 2021, Simmonds received an honorary DSc from the University of the West Indies.

Simmonds published an autobiography in 2019 entitled The Making of a National Hero.

Political offices
Preceded by Lee Moore	Premier of Saint Kitts and Nevis; 1980–1983	Succeeded by Office abolished
Preceded by Office created	Prime Minister of Saint Kitts and Nevis; 1983–1995	Succeeded by Denzil Douglas
