= The Right Excellent =

Style of address

The honorific prefix "The Right Excellent" is a form of address that is used in several Commonwealth Caribbean countries.

== Overview ==
In The Bahamas, members of the Order of National Hero are accorded the style "The Right Excellent". Examples are Sir Lynden Oscar Pindling and Sir Roland Theodore Symonette, who were granted the Order posthumously in 2018.

In Barbados, members of the Order of National Heroes are conferred the title of "The Right Excellent". An example is pop singer Rihanna, who is a Barbadian native.

In Grenada, a person upon whom the Prestige Order of National Hero has been confirmed shall be referred to as "Right Excellent".

In Jamaica, members of the Order of the National Hero are entitled to use the style of "The Right Excellent". An example is Sir Alexander Bustamante, who was the first Prime Minister of Jamaica.

In Saint Kitts and Nevis, the style is used by people who are members of the Order of the National Hero.

== See also ==
- Order of precedence
