= Saint Kitts and Nevis Labour Party =

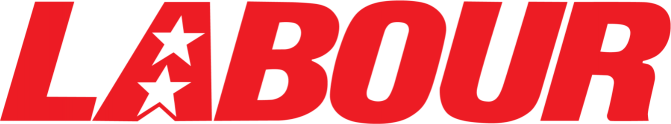
- Leader: Terrance Drew
- Chairperson: Earl Asim Martin
- Founded: 25 January 1932
- Headquarters: Masses House, Church Street, Basseterre
- Ideology: Social democracy
- Political position: Centre-left
- National Assembly: 6 / 11

Website
- www.sknlabourparty.com

The Saint Kitts and Nevis Labour Party (SKNLP), also known simply as Labour, is a centre-left political party in Saint Kitts and Nevis. It is currently in government in the country after winning six of the eleven contested seats in the 2022 general election. It is the oldest active political party in the English-speaking Caribbean.

== History ==
The party was founded in 1932 and was initially known as the St Kitts Workers' League. It put forward two candidates in the 1937 elections, both of which were elected. It subsequently won all the elected seats in 1940, 1943 and 1946.

From 1946 until 1978, the party was led by Robert Bradshaw. It saw most of its success on Saint Kitts, as voters on Nevis and Anguilla islands tended to elect independents and local parties. Labour was the only party to contest the 1952 elections and won all eight seats. They retained power in the 1957 despite losing three seats to independents. The party was also victorious in 1961 and changed its name to the St Kitts-Nevis-Anguilla Labour Party in 1966. It went on to win three consecutive elections, in 1966, 1971 and 1975, winning seven seats on each occasion.

When Anguilla seceded in 1980, the party adopted its current name. In the elections that year, the party was reduced to four seats, and although it was the largest faction in the National Assembly, the opposition People's Action Movement was able to form a coalition government. The Labour Party was reduced to two seats in the 1984 elections and remained with only two MPs after the 1989 elections. Although it received the most votes in the 1993 elections and won the same number of seats as the PAM, the PAM remained in power. However, early elections were called in 1995, in which the Labour Party won a majority of seats. They increased their majority in the 2000 elections and retained power in elections in 2004 and 2010.

After Labour suffered defeats in 2015 and 2020, Denzil Douglas decided to step down as party leader in 2021. Party chairman Terrance Drew was elected as his successor in a leadership election held at the party's 2021 national conference. Earl Asim Martin became the new party chairman.

== Leadership ==
- Robert Llewellyn Bradshaw, 1945-1978
- Paul Southwell, 1978-1979
- Lee Moore, 1979-1989
- Denzil Douglas, 1989-2021
- Terrance Drew, 2021-

== Election results ==
=== National elections ===
Election year	Party leader	# of votes	% of vote	# of overall seats won	+/–	Govt?
1937	Thomas Manchester	—N/a		2 / 5	▲2	Opposition
1940	Thomas Manchester	—N/a		3 / 5	▲1	Majority
1943	Joseph Matthew Sebastian	—N/a		3 / 5	Steady	Majority
1946	Robert Llewellyn Bradshaw	—N/a		3 / 5	Steady	Majority
1952	Robert Llewellyn Bradshaw	11,016	84.7 (#1)	8 / 8	▲5	Majority
1957	Robert Llewellyn Bradshaw	5,270	53.6 (#1)	5 / 8	▼3	Majority
1961	Robert Llewellyn Bradshaw	7,808	64.5 (#1)	7 / 10	▲2	Majority
1966	Robert Llewellyn Bradshaw	6,249	44.3 (#1)	7 / 10	Steady	Coalition with UNM
1971	Robert Llewellyn Bradshaw	7,416	50.8 (#1)	7 / 10	Steady	Majority
1975	Robert Llewellyn Bradshaw	7,363	60.2 (#1)	7 / 10	Steady	Majority
1980	Lee Moore	7,355	55.0 (#1)	4 / 9	▼3	Official Opposition
1984	Lee Moore	7,463	41.3 (#2)	2 / 11	▼2	Official Opposition
1989	Lee Moore	6,642	37.3 (#2)	2 / 11	Steady	Official Opposition
1993	Denzil Douglas	8,405	43.8 (#1)	4 / 11	▲2	Official Opposition
1995	Denzil Douglas	10,662	49.2 (#1)	7 / 11	▲3	Majority
2000	Denzil Douglas	11,762	53.6 (#1)	8 / 11	▲1	Majority
2004	Denzil Douglas	11,426	50.6 (#1)	7 / 11	▼1	Majority
2010	Denzil Douglas	12,227	47.0 (#1)	6 / 11	▼1	Coalition with NRP
2015	Denzil Douglas	11,897	39.3 (#1)	3 / 11	▼3	Official Opposition
2020	Denzil Douglas	10,355	37.1 (#1)	2 / 11	▼1	Official Opposition
2022	Terrance Drew	13,438	45.8 (#1)	6 / 11	▲4	Majority

=== Nevis Local Council elections ===
Election year	Party leader	# of votes	% of vote	# of seats won	+/–	Govt?	Ref.
1979	Lee Moore	371	12.8% (#2)	0 / 9	New	No seats won	
