= 9th Summit of the Americas =

2022 international conference

9th Summit of the Americas IX Cumbre de las Américas
- Host country: United States
- Date: June 6–10, 2022
- Cities: Los Angeles
- Follows: 8th Summit of the Americas
- Precedes: 10th Summit of the Americas

The Ninth Summit of the Americas was an international conference held in Los Angeles, United States, from June 6 to 10, 2022. The theme was "Building a Sustainable, Resilient, and Equitable Future".

== Background ==
The White House announced in January 2022 that the City of Los Angeles would serve as host. As host, the United States selects the site of the summit and its attendees. The United States did not invite Cuba, Venezuela, and Nicaragua to the summit as these countries are accused of having undemocratically elected leaders. It was known the US would not invite these leaders. The White House and State Department did not announce an official invitation list until May 30.

Andrés Manuel López Obrador, the President of Mexico, was the first to announce he would not attend the summit if all nations were not in attendance. López Obrador stated he would send his foreign secretary to the summit in his place. Other leaders followed, such as Xiomara Castro, the President of Honduras; Luis Arce, the President of Bolivia; Nayib Bukele, the President of El Salvador; and Ralph Gonsalves, the Prime Minister of Saint Vincent and the Grenadines. Cuban President Miguel Díaz-Canel and Nicaraguan President Daniel Ortega said they would not attend the summit if invited.

The United States Department of State led efforts to galvanize support for the summit and keep other nations from not attending. Assistant Secretary of State for Western Hemisphere Affairs Brian A. Nichols stated the US will not invite countries that do not respect democracy.

Alejandro Giammattei, the President of Guatemala, stated he would not attend the summit after the US criticized his government's reappointment of María Consuelo Porras as attorney general, who had been accused of undermining corruption investigations. Uruguayan President Luis Lacalle Pou had been scheduled to attend, but cancelled after testing positive for COVID-19. Grenadian Prime Minister Keith Mitchell announced he would not attend due to the current election cycle in his country. Mexico, Guatemala, El Salvador, Honduras, Bolivia, Uruguay, Grenada, and Saint Kitts and Nevis sent a delegation headed by their respective secretaries or ambassadors. Cuba, Venezuela, Nicaragua, and Saint Vincent and the Grenadines had no government delegation at the summit.

== Events ==
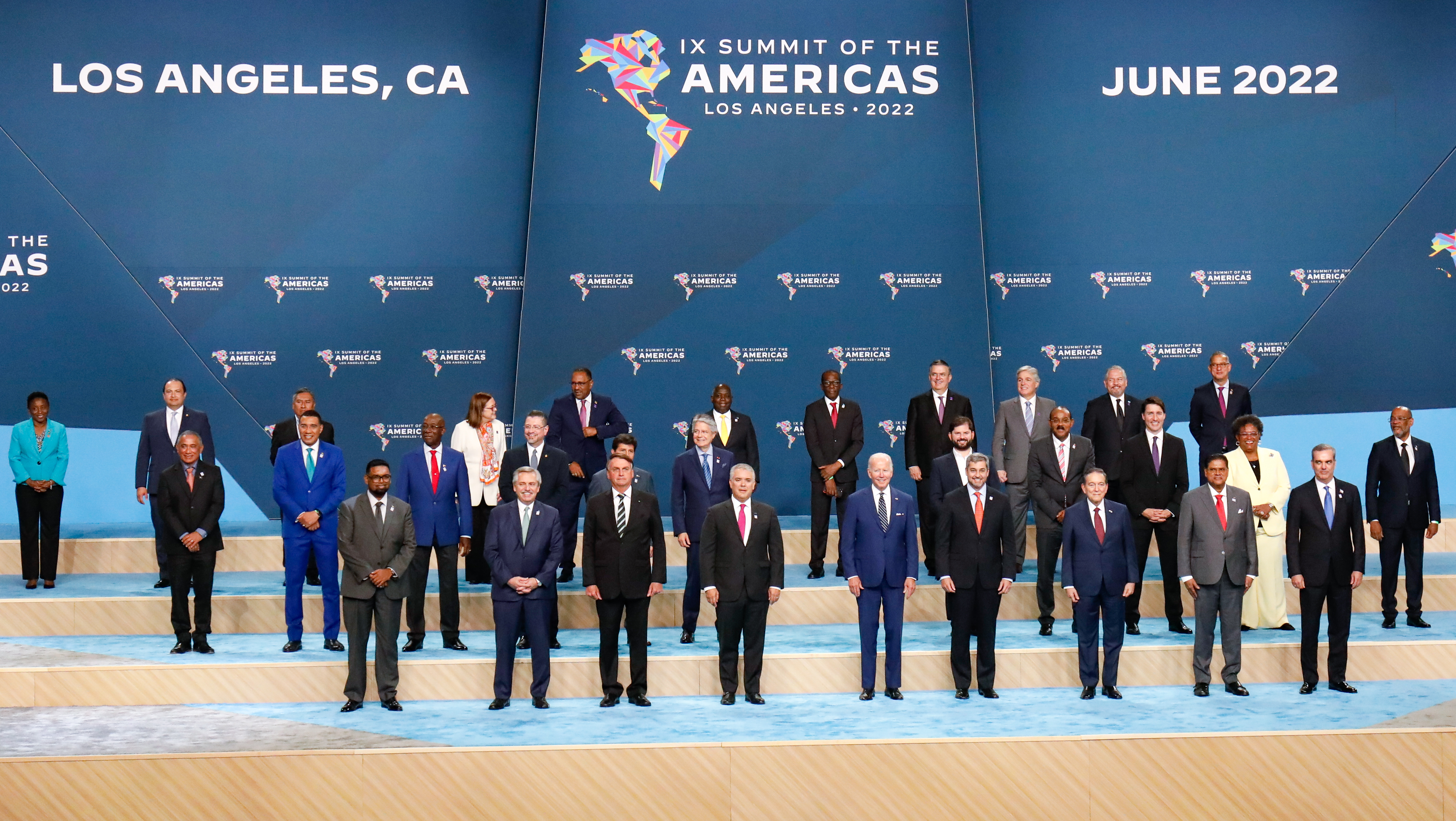
Heads of Delegation of the IX Summit of the Americas Photo

=== Monday June 6 ===
Pre-Summit Civil Society Forum.

=== Tuesday June 7 ===
Civil Society Forum, Young Americas Forum, CEO Summit of the Americas.

=== Wednesday June 8 ===
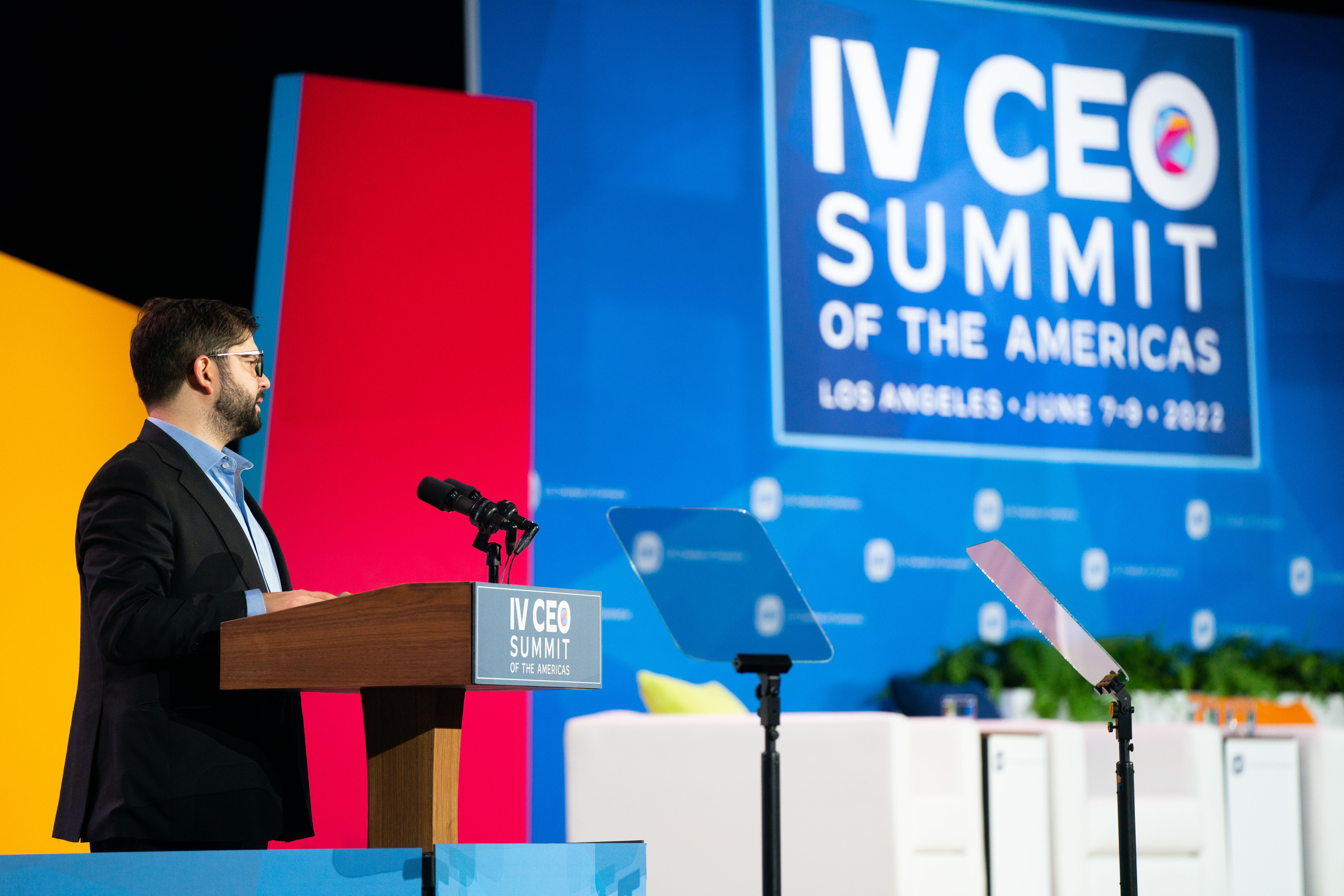
The 4th CEO Summit of the Americas

Civil Society Forum, Young Americas Forum, CEO Summit of the Americas.

The inaugural ceremony was held at the Peacock Theater in Downtown Los Angeles. Music producer Emilio Estefan organized the musical performances. Performances by Alex Fernandez Jr., Sheila E. and music written for the event by Estefan himself. The song was sung by a teenage choir. Welcome speeches were given by Mayor Eric Garcetti, California Governor Gavin Newsom and Vice President Kamala Harris.

=== Thursday June 9 ===
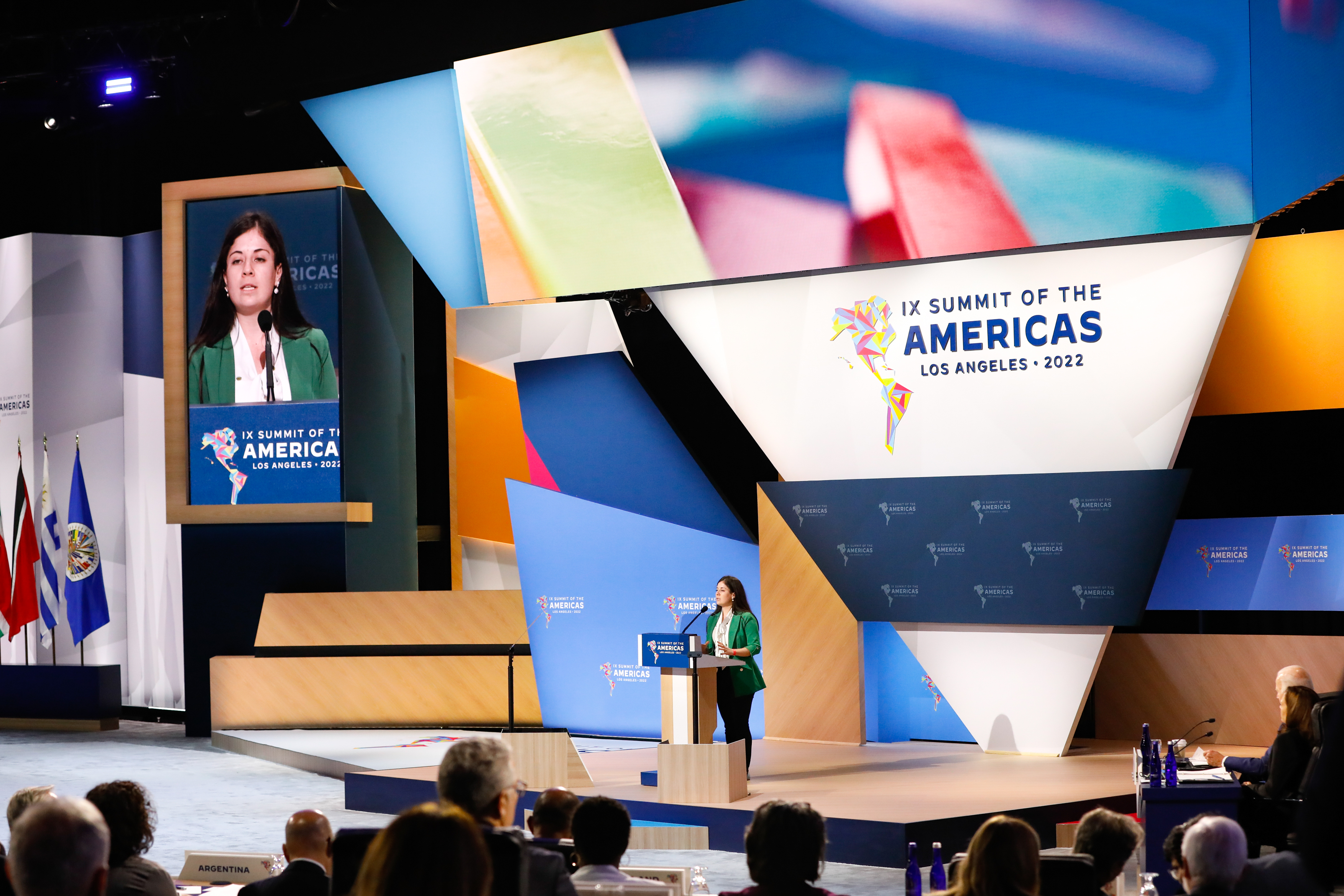
The first plenary session

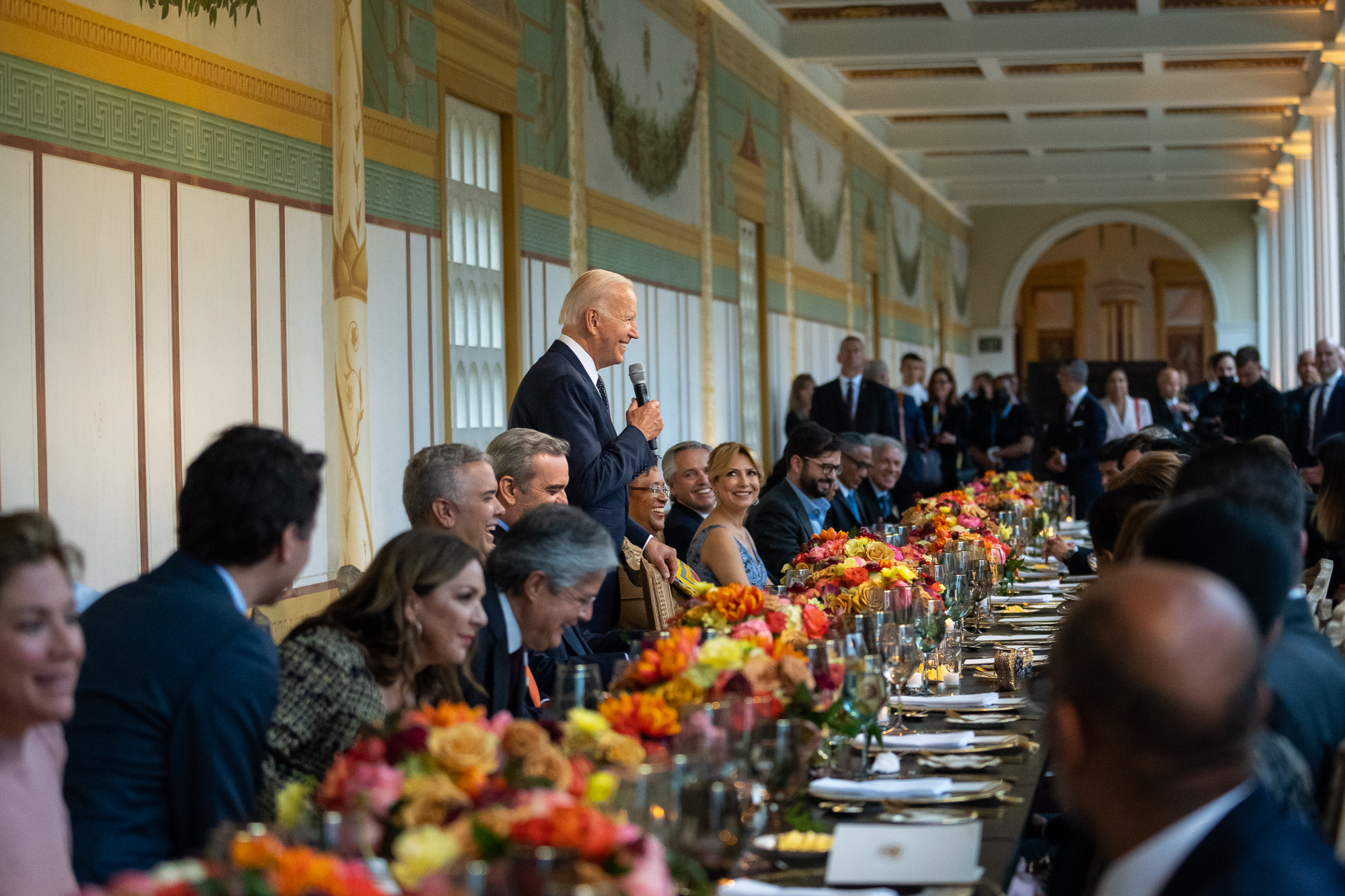
Dinner at the Getty Villa

Young Americas Forum, CEO Summit of the Americas, First plenary session.

After the first plenary session held at the Los Angeles Convention Center in Downtown Los Angeles, President Biden and First Lady Jill Biden held a dinner for world leaders and their spouses at the Getty Villa museum in the Pacific Palisades neighborhood of Los Angeles. Secretary of State Antony Blinken and Second Gentleman Douglas Emhoff hosted a dinner for foreign secretaries and their delegations at the Los Angeles County Museum of Art (LACMA). In attendance was the Los Angeles Latin diplomatic corps, the Los Angeles Consular Corps, California's two U.S. senators, a congressional delegation headed by Speaker of the House Nancy Pelosi, California Governor Gavin Newsom and local county and city leaders.

=== Friday June 10 ===
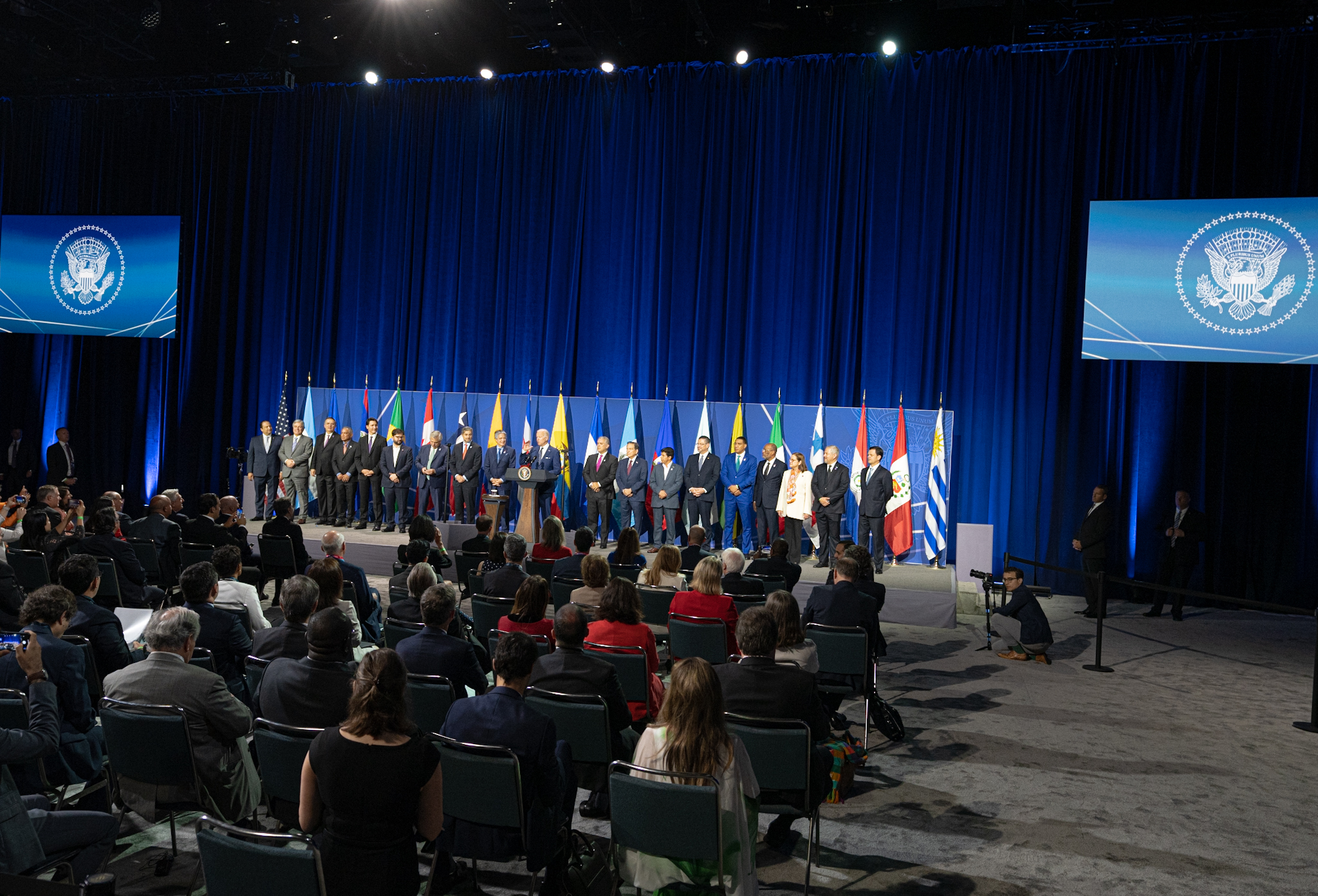
The signing of the Los Angeles Declaration on Migration and Protection

Second and third plenary session.

Twenty countries signed on to the "Los Angeles Declaration on Migration and Protection in the Americas".

== Delegation leaders ==
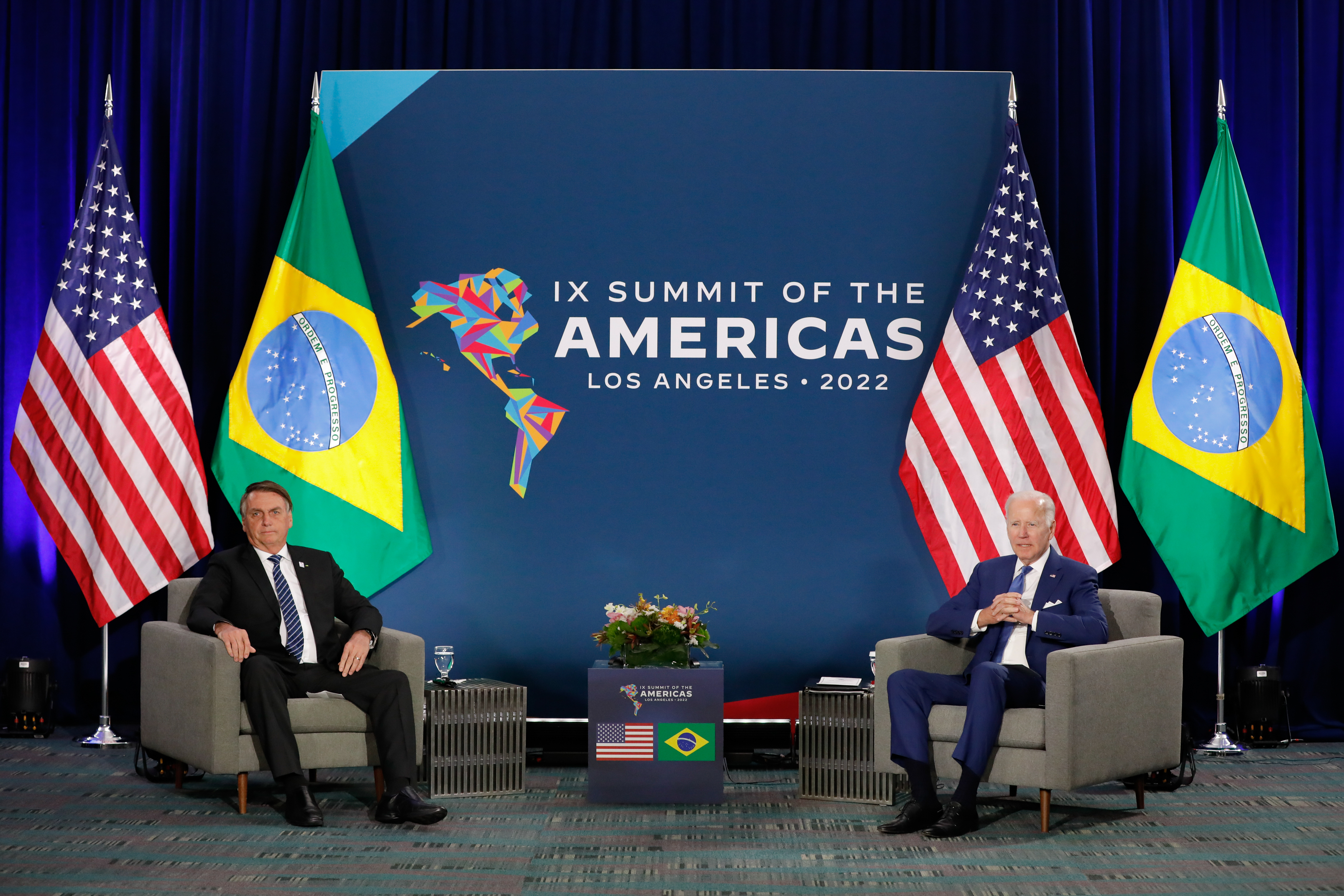
United States President Joe Biden with Brazilian President Jair Bolsonaro

Summary of attending leaders
Country	Chief representative	Office	Ref.
Antigua and Barbuda	Gaston Browne	Prime Minister	
Argentina	Alberto Fernández	President	
Bahamas	Philip Davis	Prime Minister	
Barbados	Mia Mottley	Prime Minister	
Belize	Johnny Briceño	Prime Minister	
Bolivia	Rogelio Mayta	Minister of Foreign Relations	
Brazil	Jair Bolsonaro	President	
Canada	Justin Trudeau	Prime Minister	
Chile	Gabriel Boric	President	
Colombia	Iván Duque	President	
Costa Rica	Rodrigo Chaves Robles	President	
Cuba	Uninvited		
Dominica	Roosevelt Skerrit	Prime Minister	
Dominican Republic	Luis Abinader	President	
Ecuador	Guillermo Lasso	President	
El Salvador	Alexandra Hill Tinoco	Minister of Foreign Affairs	
Grenada	Nickolas Steele	Minister for Health and Social Security of Grenada	
Guatemala	Mario Búcaro	Minister of Foreign Affairs	
Guyana	Irfaan Ali	President	
Haiti	Ariel Henry	Prime Minister	
Honduras	Enrique Reina	Minister of Foreign Affairs of Honduras	
Jamaica	Andrew Holness	Prime Minister	
Mexico	Marcelo Ebrard	Secretary of Foreign Affairs	
Nicaragua	Uninvited		
Panama	Laurentino Cortizo	President	
Paraguay	Mario Abdo Benítez	President	
Peru	Pedro Castillo	President	
Saint Kitts and Nevis	Thelma Phillip-Browne	Ambassador	
Saint Lucia	Philip J. Pierre	Prime Minister	
Saint Vincent and the Grenadines	Did not attend		
Suriname	Chan Santokhi	President	
Trinidad and Tobago	Keith Rowley	Prime Minister	
United States	Joe Biden	President	
Uruguay	Francisco Bustillo	Minister of Foreign Relations	
Venezuela	Uninvited		

Preceded by 8th Summit of the Americas	Summits of the Americas; 2022; Los Angeles, United States	Succeeded by 10th Summit of the Americas
