= Vehicle registration plates of Austria =

Republic of Austria/Republik Österreich
- Example of a licence plate in Austria used since 2002 ("S" for Salzburg), with the Salzburg coat of arms.
- Country: Austria
- Country code: A

Current series
- Slogan: None
- Size: 520 mm × 120 mm 20.5 in × 4.7 in
- Colour (front): Black on white
- Colour (rear): Black on white

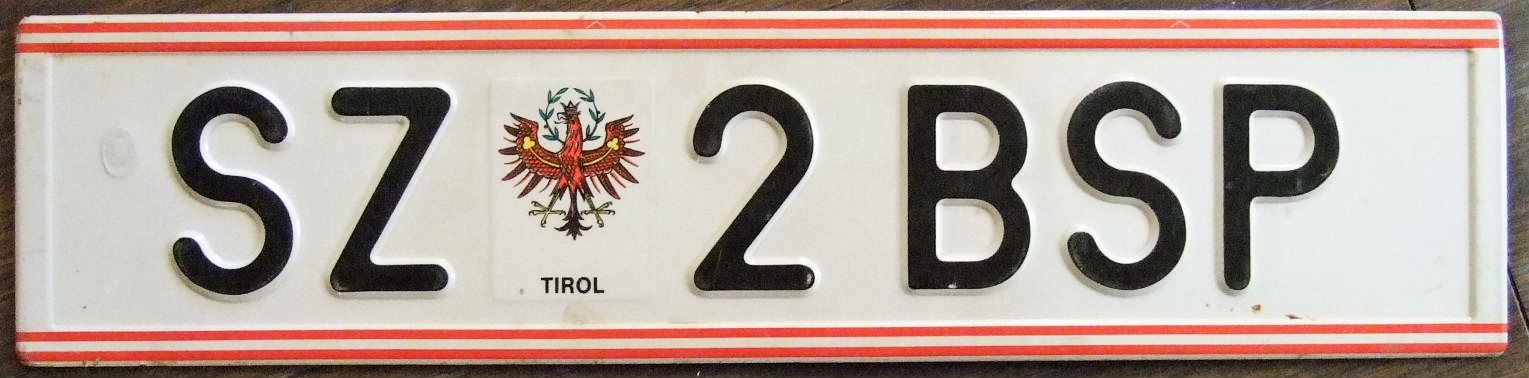
Example of a licence plate in Austria without the EU symbol used 1990–2002

Austrian car number plates are mandatory vehicle registration plates displaying the registration mark (German: Kennzeichen) of motor vehicles in Austria. They are used to verify street legality, proof of a valid liability insurance and to identify and recognise the vehicle.

== Appearance ==
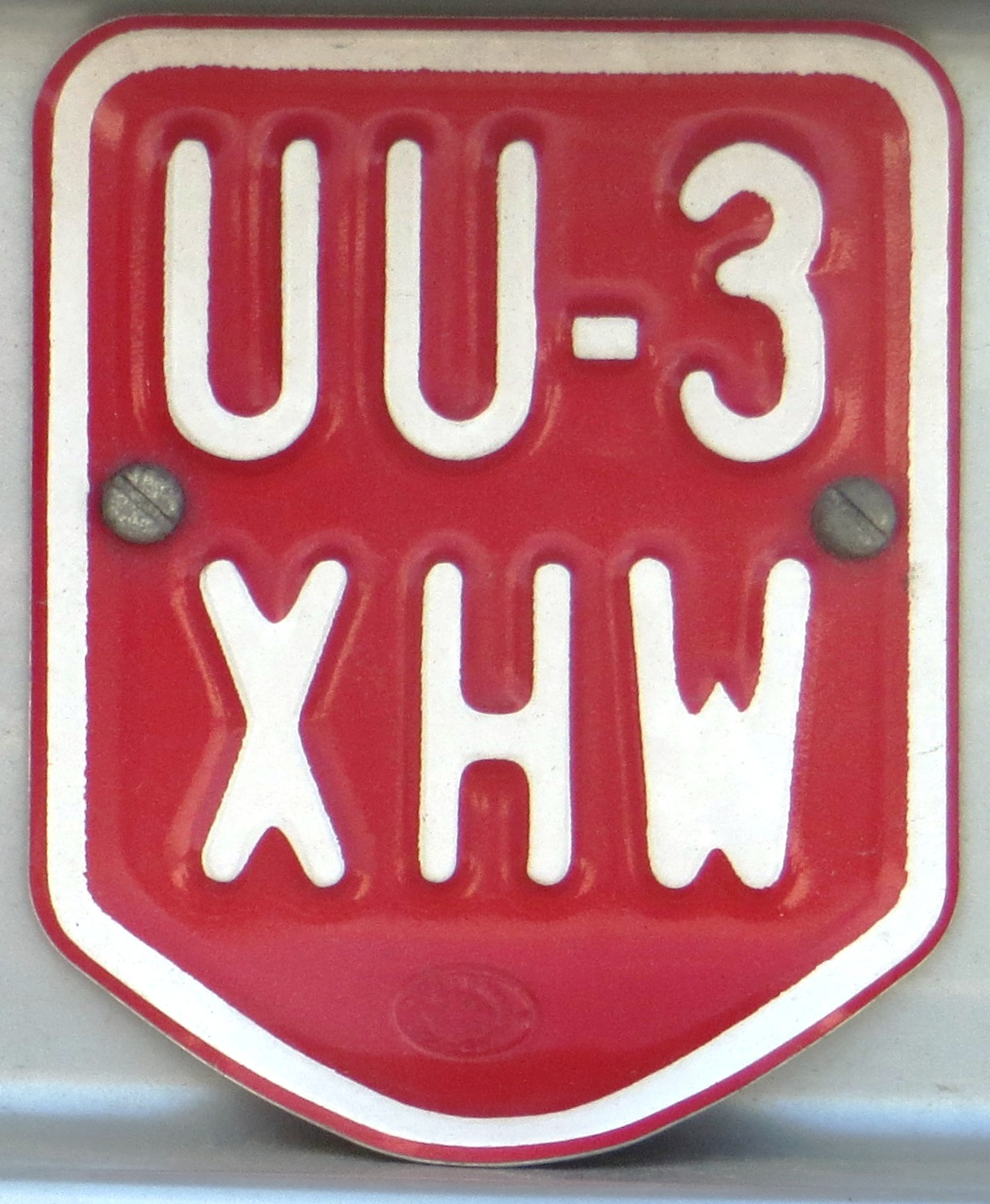
Moped plate

The licence plates are made of metal; the imprinted text is in black letters and digits on a white background. Since November 1, 2002 the common design comprises a blue section on the left with the EU circle of stars and the country code ('A') like other vehicle registration plates of the European Union. On the top and bottom, there are red-white-red tribands, the national colours of Austria. Two plates have to be present on each car (front and rear). Dealer plates show white letters on a green background, temporary plates show white letters on a cyan background, and foreign trailers show white letters on a red background. For motorbikes and cars with smaller areas for plates, smaller licence plates are available with two lines of text. Moped plates are in different appearance and shape, they show white letters on a red background.

== Lettering system ==
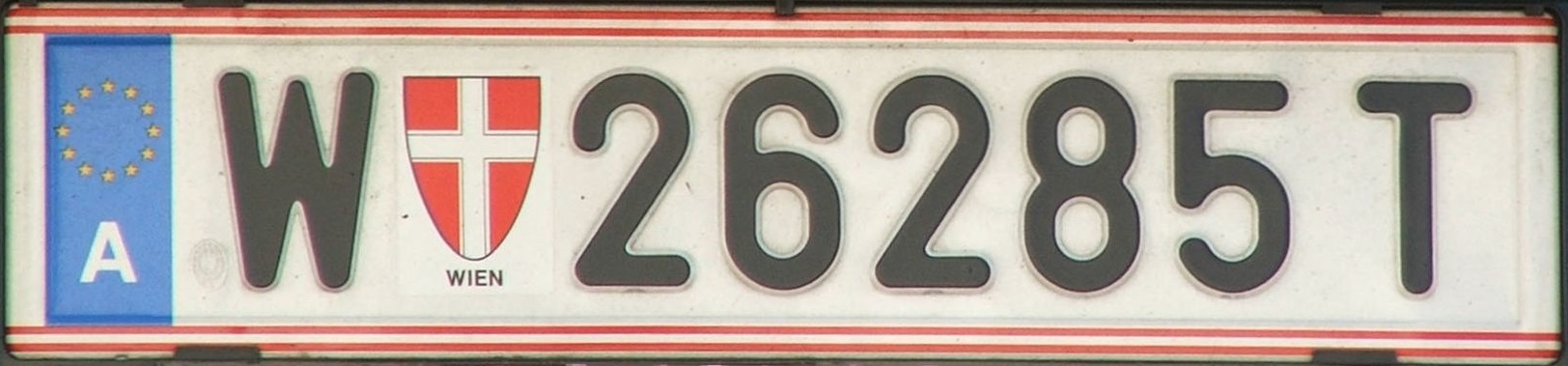
Licence plate issued in Vienna ("W" for Wien)

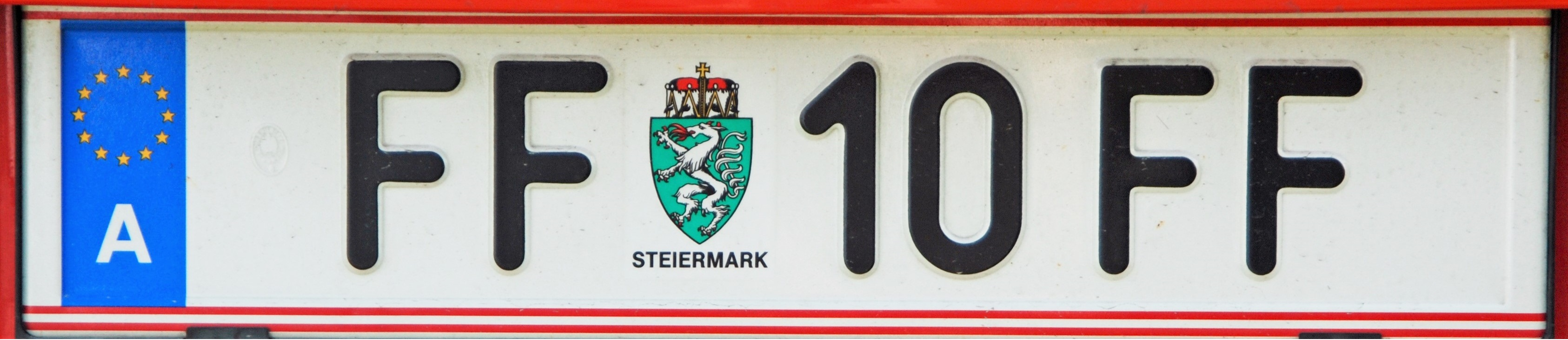
A FF plate from former Fürstenfeld district, with the lowest digits 10 and Styrian arms

The alphanumeric format for registration plates is "XX ∇=provincial emblem number+letter(s)" or "XX ∇=provincial emblem personalised letters+number";

- XX - one or two letters which indicate the local registration office (district where the registered possessor resides). As a general rule, State capitals have one letter; other districts have two letters.
- the coat of arms of the Austrian state the district belongs to (here shown as "∇"); diplomatic vehicles have a dash (–) instead, federal official vehicles wear the Austrian Federal Eagle.
- A three to six-letter/number sequence which uniquely distinguishes each of the vehicles displaying the same initial area code. The letter Q is excluded from all sequences.

There are several lettering schemes:

- The letter/number sequence must contain at least three characters (at least one digit and one letter). In countryside districts, the maximum is five characters. Regular plates start with a digit and end with a letter. Personalized plates, which can be obtained by paying an extra fee, are ordered vice versa. (exceptions: see below)
- The letter/number sequence of state capitals contains up to six characters (at least one digit one letter with a minimum of four characters) (e.g. W ∇ 12345 A).
- Until the year 2000 the plates were issued by the district administrations, who used a variety of lettering schemes, e.g. one digit and three letters (e.g. FK ∇ 1 ABC in the Feldkirch district), two digits and two letters (e.g. WL ∇ 12 AB in the Wels-Land district) or three digits and one letter.
- Since 2000 the vehicle registration have been carried out by car insurance companies on behalf of the government. The branch offices of these companies issue the plates, which show three digits and two letters (e.g. XX ∇ 123 AB) in each district or four digits and two letters in state capitals respectively.

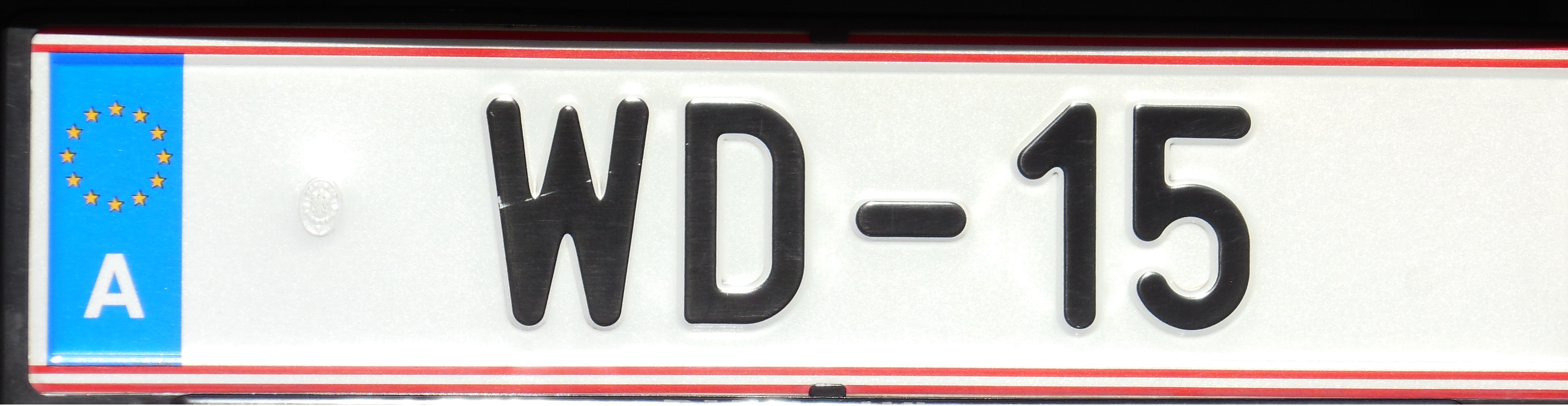
Chilean ambassador in Vienna

- Army, diplomats, police etc. have a number up to five digits only (starting with 1, incrementing)
- There are standardized abbreviations for special types of cars. But most of them are in use in Vienna only:
  - BB Bundesbahnen (Federal Railways), only with Index "W", e.g. W ∇ 1234 BB
  - BE Bestattung (funeral services)
  - EW E-Werk (electric power company)
  - FF Freiwillige Feuerwehr (volunteer firemen)
  - FW Feuerwehr (firemen)
  - GW Gaswerk (gas power company)
  - GT Gütertransport (vehicles transporting goods)
  - IBK Stadt Innsbruck (municipal vehicles of Innsbruck)
  - KT Kleintransport (private vehicles transporting parcels)
  - LO Linienomnibus (public service buses)
  - LR Landesregierung (Local government of Niederösterreich)
  - LV Landesregierung (Local government of Tyrol)
  - MA Magistrat Wien (Local government of Vienna)
  - MW Mietwagen (private hire car or bus service [with driver])
  - RD Rettungsdienst (ambulance vehicles)
  - RK Rotes Kreuz (Red Cross)
  - TX Taxi (taxis)

== Personalised plates ==
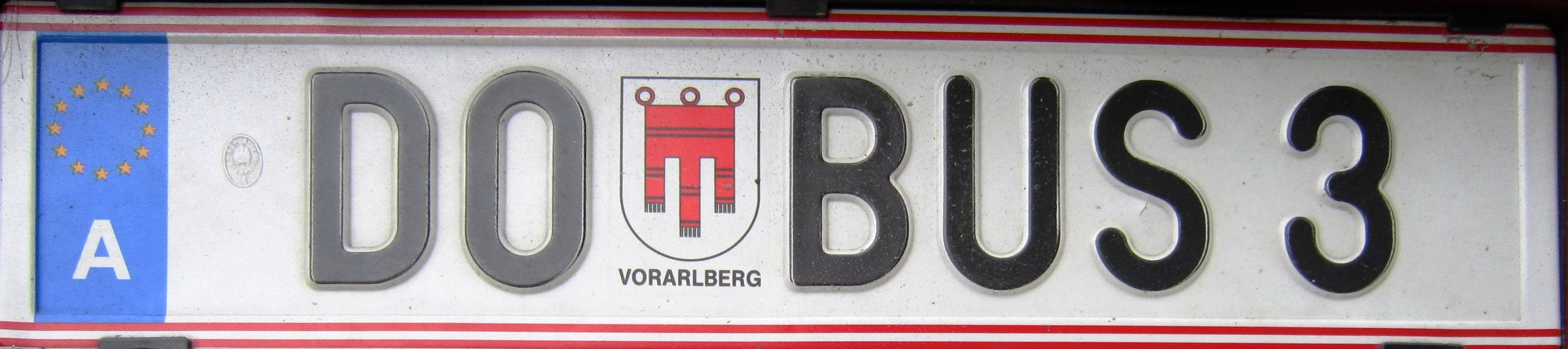
Personalised plate from Dornbirn, with Vorarlberg arms

In Austria, it is possible to obtain a customized registration plate by payment of €228.30 for registration and €21.00 for the plates themselves. An example of a customized plate is XX ∇ ABC 1. In general, the alphanumeric combination that goes after the coat of arms must consist of at least three characters and begin with a letter and end with a number. The letters and numbers must each be grouped together in a block. This makes such plates easily distinguishable from standard ones.

== Electric plates ==
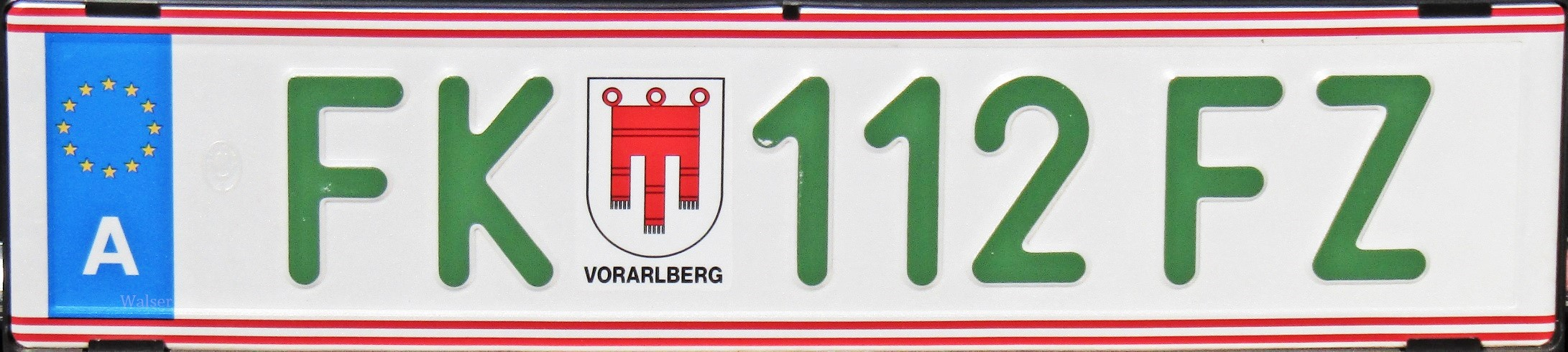
Electric plate from Feldkirch

Since 2017, electric plates have been introduced in Austria, These special plates are given only to electric vehicles and were initially associated with exemptions from parking charges in cities such as Vienna, Innsbruck, Klagenfurt, Wels, Linz, Graz, Mödling, Zell am See, Klosterneuburg, and Krems. However, in recent years, some municipalities have revised or discontinued these benefits. For example, as of 2018, electric vehicles are no longer exempt from parking charges in Innsbruck. As regulations may vary by city, drivers should consult local authorities for up-to-date information.

== Other plates ==
=== Export transit plates ===
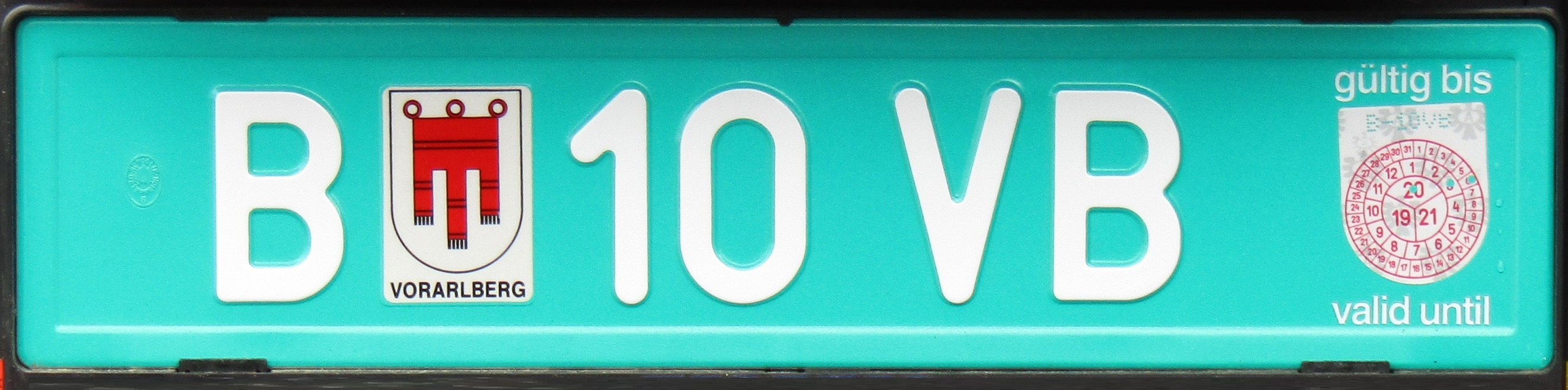
Export transit plate.

Export transit plates are vehicle plates that are issued to vehicles that are being exported, the plate is used for vehicles that need to get to their desired export destination, but are not allowed to use regular licence plates because they have been deregistered abroad. For motor vehicles the cost of an export transit plate is €197.3. The export transit plates are valid for 3 to 21 days.

=== Temporary plates ===
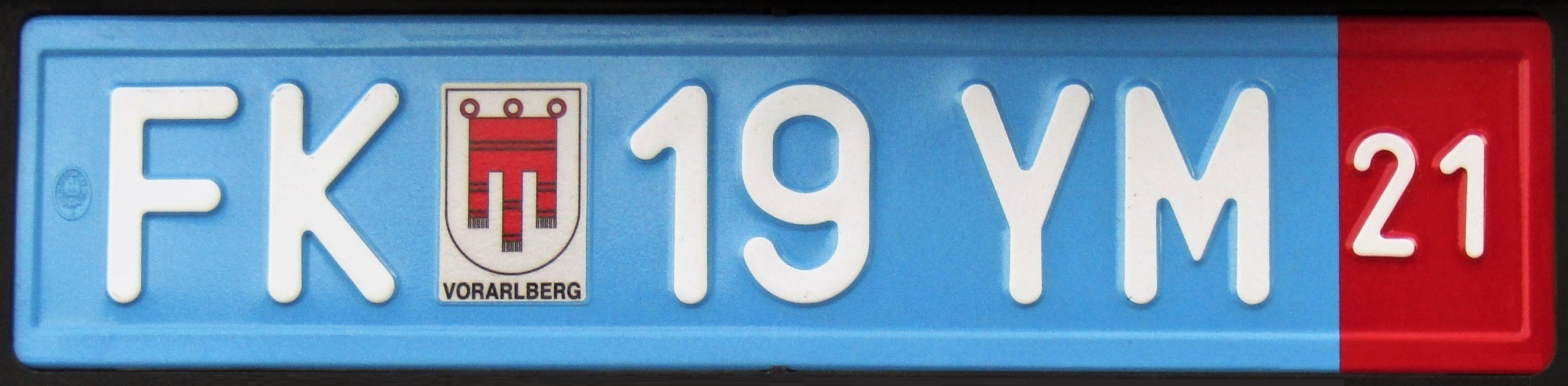
Temporary plate. The number on the right is the year of validity.

Temporary plates are cyan with white lettering, featuring a red strip on the right side showing the year the plate is valid.

=== Foreign trailer plates ===
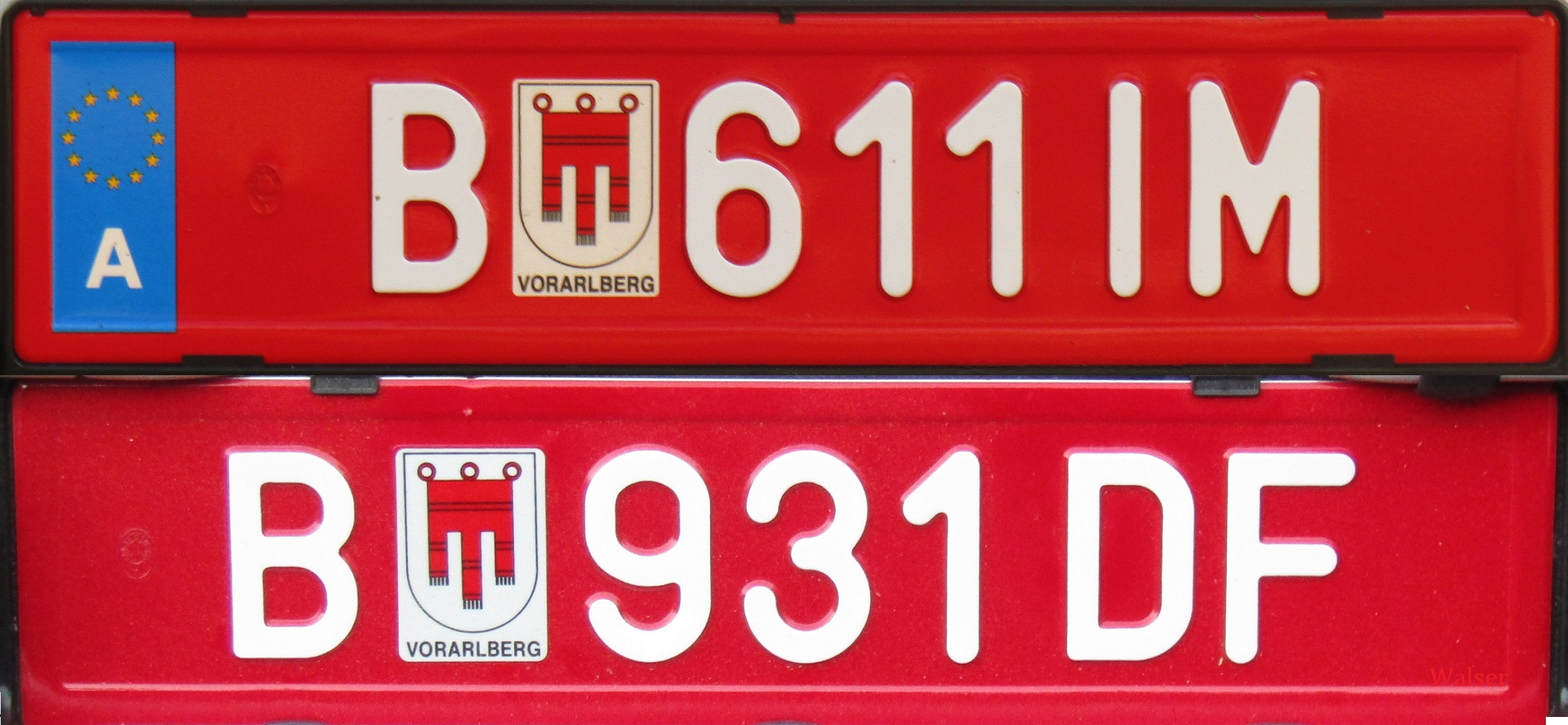
Foreign trailer plates (top: post-2021 design, bottom: 1990-2021 design). Note that the number is the same as on the truck.

Foreign trailers towed by Austrian prime movers must carry an Austrian license plate covering the foreign one. This plate consists of white lettering on a red background, and the displayed sequence is the same as the one of the tractor. The design changed in 2021 to include the EU strip.

== Prefixes ==
Code	City, District and official vehicles	Coat of Arms that appears on the plate (Note: Typically, the State's coat of arms for ordinary plates and the Federal coat of arms for official plates)	Notes
A	Austria (Federal officials)	Federal	Federal president's plate
AM	Amstetten	Lower Austria	
B	Bregenz	Vorarlberg	
B	Burgenland (Burgenland state officials)	Burgenland	
BA	Bad Aussee (sub-district)	Styria	Suspended on July 1, 2013; replaced with LI.
BB	Bundesbahnen (Federal Railways)	Federal	Obsolete, ÖBB vehicles now use W ∇ XXX BB plates
BD	Bundesbusdienst (Federal Bus Service)	Federal	Since 2008 for Postbus coaches only, until 1997 also for ÖBB coaches
BG	Bundesgendarmerie (Federal gendarmerie)	Federal	Obsolete since July 2005, when Gendarmerie and police merged
BH	Bundesheer (Federal Army)	Federal	
BL	Bruck an der Leitha	Lower Austria	
BM	Bruck-Mürzzuschlag	Styria	Since 2013.
BM	Bruck an der Mur	Styria	Until 2012.
BN	Baden	Lower Austria	
BP	Bundespolizei (Federal police)	Federal	Since July 2005 for all new registered police cars
BR	Braunau am Inn	Upper Austria	
BZ	Bludenz	Vorarlberg	
DL	Deutschlandsberg	Styria	
DO	Dornbirn	Vorarlberg	
E	Eisenstadt	Burgenland	Also for the city of Rust, Burgenland.
EF	Eferding	Upper Austria	
EU	Eisenstadt-Umgebung	Burgenland	Eisenstadt surrounding area
FB	Feldbach	Styria	Suspended on July 1, 2013; replaced with SO.
FE	Feldkirchen	Carinthia	
FF	Fürstenfeld	Styria	Suspended on July 1, 2013; replaced with HF.
FK	Feldkirch	Vorarlberg	
FR	Freistadt	Upper Austria	
FV	Finanzverwaltung (Financial Administration)	Federal	since 2005
FW	Feuerwehr (Fire brigade)	Feuerwehr	since February 2020
G	Graz	Styria	
GB	Gröbming sub-district	Styria	
GD	Gmünd	Lower Austria	
GF	Gänserndorf	Lower Austria	
GK	Graz, Konsularkorps (Consular corps in Styria)	None	
GM	Gmunden	Upper Austria	
GR	Grieskirchen	Upper Austria	
GS	Güssing	Burgenland	
GU	Graz-Umgebung	Styria	Graz surrounding area.
HA	Hallein	Salzburg	
HB	Hartberg	Styria	Suspended on July 1, 2013; replaced with HF.
HE	Hermagor	Carinthia	
HF	Hartberg-Fürstenfeld	Styria	Since July 1, 2013.
HL	Hollabrunn	Lower Austria	
HO	Horn	Lower Austria	
I	Innsbruck	Tyrol	
IL	Innsbruck-Land	Tyrol	Innsbruck countryside area.
IM	Imst	Tyrol	
JE	Jennersdorf	Burgenland	
JO	St. Johann im Pongau	Salzburg	
JU	Judenburg	Styria	Suspended on July 1, 2012; replaced with MT.
JW	Justizwache (Justice police)	Federal	
K	Klagenfurt	Carinthia	
K	Kärnten (Carinthia state officials)	Carinthia	
KB	Kitzbühel	Tyrol	
KF	Knittelfeld	Styria	Suspended on July 1, 2012; replaced with MT.
KG	Klosterneuburg	Lower Austria	
KI	Kirchdorf an der Krems	Upper Austria	
KK	Kärnten, Konsularkorps (Consular corps in Carinthia)	None	
KL	Klagenfurt-Land	Carinthia	Klagenfurt countryside area.
KO	Korneuburg	Lower Austria	
KR	Krems-Land	Lower Austria	Krems countryside area.
KS	Krems	Lower Austria	Krems City.
KU	Kufstein	Tyrol	
L	Linz	Upper Austria	
LA	Landeck	Tyrol	
LB	Leibnitz	Styria	
LE	Leoben	Styria	Leoben City.
LF	Lilienfeld	Lower Austria	
LI	Liezen	Styria	
LL	Linz-Land	Upper Austria	Linz countryside area.
LN	Leoben	Styria	Leoben countryside area.
LZ	Lienz	Tyrol	
MA	Mattersburg	Burgenland	
MD	Mödling	Lower Austria	
ME	Melk	Lower Austria	
MI	Mistelbach	Lower Austria	
MT	Murtal	Styria	Since July 1, 2012.
MU	Murau	Styria	
MZ	Mürzzuschlag	Styria	Suspended on July 1, 2012; replaced with BM.
N	Niederösterreich (Lower Austria state officials)	Lower Austria	
ND	Neusiedl am See	Burgenland	
NK	Neunkirchen	Lower Austria	
O	Oberösterreich (Upper Austria state officials)	Upper Austria	
OP	Oberpullendorf	Burgenland	
OW	Oberwart	Burgenland	
P	St. Pölten	Lower Austria	
PE	Perg	Upper Austria	
PL	St. Pölten-Land	Lower Austria	St. Pölten countryside area.
PT	Österreichische Post (national mail company)	Federal	Until 1996, for Post- und Telegraphenverwaltung (former national mail and phone company)
RA	Bad Radkersburg	Styria	Suspended on July 1, 2013; replaced with SO
RE	Reutte	Tyrol	
RI	Ried	Upper Austria	
RO	Rohrbach	Upper Austria	
S	Salzburg	Salzburg	Salzburg City.
S	Salzburg (Salzburg state officials)	Salzburg	
SB	Scheibbs	Lower Austria	
SD	Schärding	Upper Austria	
SD	Salzburg, Diplomatisches Korps (Diplomatic corps in Salzburg)	None	
SE	Steyr-Land	Upper Austria	Steyr countryside area.
SK	Salzburg, Konsularkorps (Consular corps in Salzburg)	None	
SL	Salzburg-Umgebung (Note: The "SL" code is derived from Salzburg-Land.)	Salzburg	Salzburg countryside area.
SO	Südoststeiermark	Styria	Since July 1, 2013.
SP	Spittal an der Drau	Carinthia	
SR	Steyr	Upper Austria	Steyr City.
ST	Steiermark (Styria state officials)	Styria	
SV	St. Veit an der Glan	Carinthia	
SW	Schwechat	Lower Austria	Schwechat City.
SZ	Schwaz	Tyrol	
T	Tirol (Tyrol state officials)	Tyrol	
TA	Tamsweg	Salzburg	
TD	Tirol, Diplomatisches Korps (Diplomatic corps in Tyrol)	None	
TK	Tirol, Konsularkorps (Consular corps in Tyrol)	None	
TU	Tulln	Lower Austria	
UU	Urfahr-Umgebung	Upper Austria	
V	Vorarlberg (Vorarlberg state officials)	Vorarlberg	
VB	Vöcklabruck	Upper Austria	
VD	Vorarlberg, Diplomatisches Korps (Diplomatic corps in Vorarlberg)	None	
VI	Villach	Carinthia	Villach City.
VK	Völkermarkt	Carinthia	
VK	Vorarlberg, Konsularkorps (Consular corps in Vorarlberg)	None	
VL	Villach-Land	Carinthia	Villach countryside area.
VO	Voitsberg	Styria	
W	Wien (Vienna)	Vienna	
WB	Wiener Neustadt-Land (Note: The "WB" code is derived from Wiener Neustadt, Bezirk.)	Lower Austria	Wiener Neustadt countryside area
WD	Wien, Diplomatisches Korps (Diplomatic corps in Vienna)	None	
WK	Wien, Konsularkorps (Consular corps in Vienna)	None	
WE	Wels	Upper Austria	Wels City
WL	Wels-Land	Upper Austria	Wels countryside area
WN	Wiener Neustadt	Lower Austria	Wiener Neustadt City
WO	Wolfsberg	Carinthia	
WT	Waidhofen an der Thaya	Lower Austria	
WU	Wien-Umgebung	Lower Austria	Vienna surrounding area; suspended on January 1, 2017; replaced with BL, KO, PL, TU
WY	Waidhofen an der Ybbs	Lower Austria	
WZ	Weiz	Styria	
ZE	Zell am See	Salzburg	
ZT	Zwettl	Lower Austria	
ZW	Zollwache (Customs officials)	Federal	Obsolete since 2005 when Zollwache merged with federal police

== Armoured Vehicles Codes ==
09	Self-propelled howitzer M109
60	Medium battle tank M60A3
78	Armoured recovery vehicle M578
88	Armoured recovery vehicle M88A1
D	ATF DINGO armoured combat vehicle (1999-2010)
DG	Polaris DAGOR ultra light combat vehicle (since 2017)
E	PANDUR EVOLUTION armoured infantry vehicle (since 2019)
G	GREIF armoured recovery vehicle
H	HÄGGLUND BvS 10 All Terrain vehicle (since 2018)
J	JAGUAR tank destroyer (1999-2010)
K	KÜRASSIER tank destroyer (1999-2010)
L	LEOPARD 2 medium battle tank
P	PIONIERPANZER armoured engineer vehicle
Q	Quad or All Terrain vehicle (since 2022)
R	PANDUR armoured infantry vehicle
S	SAURER tracked armoured infantry vehicle
U	ASCOD ULAN armoured fighting vehicle

== History ==
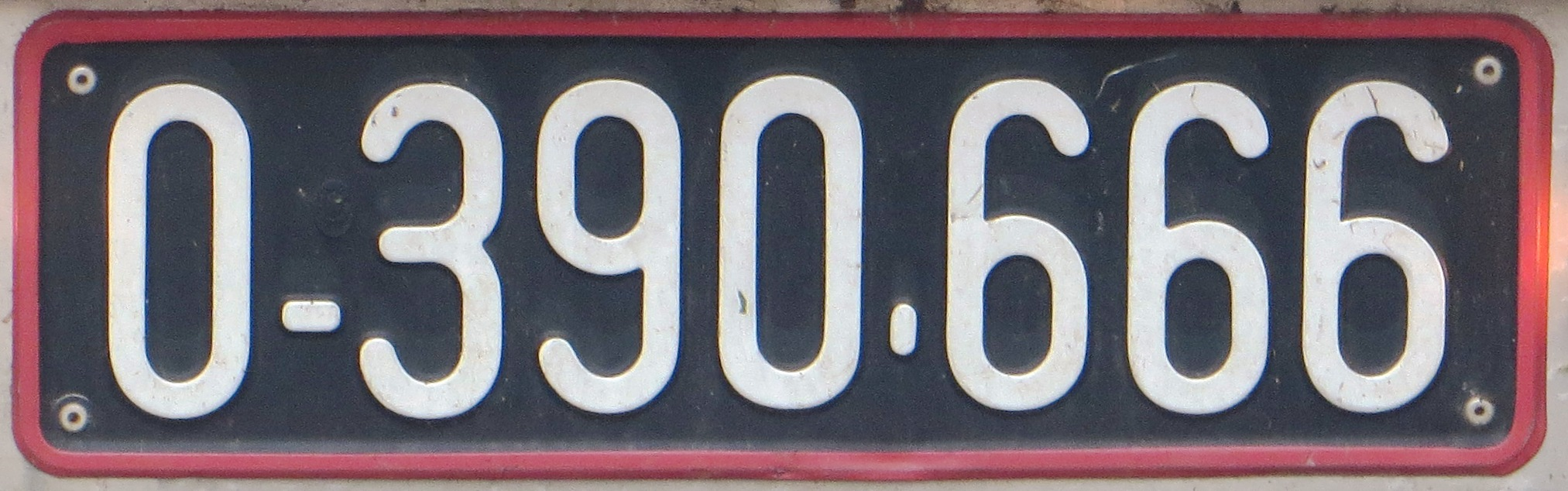
Plate of the Cold War era from Upper Austria (Oberösterreich) the first character is the letter O

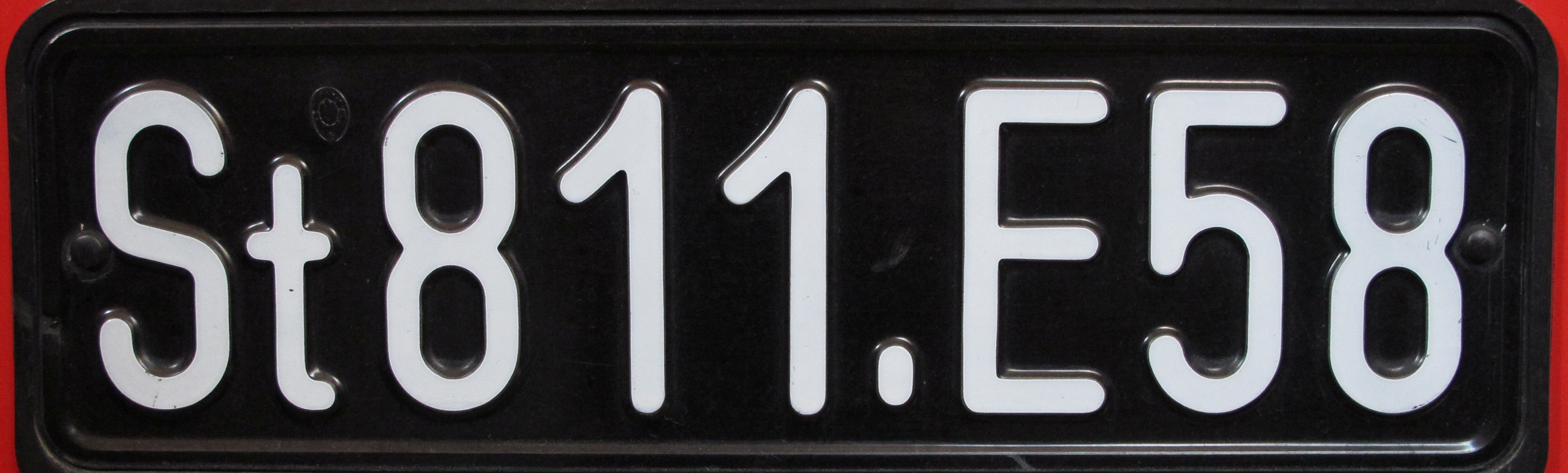
Plate of the Cold War era, Styria

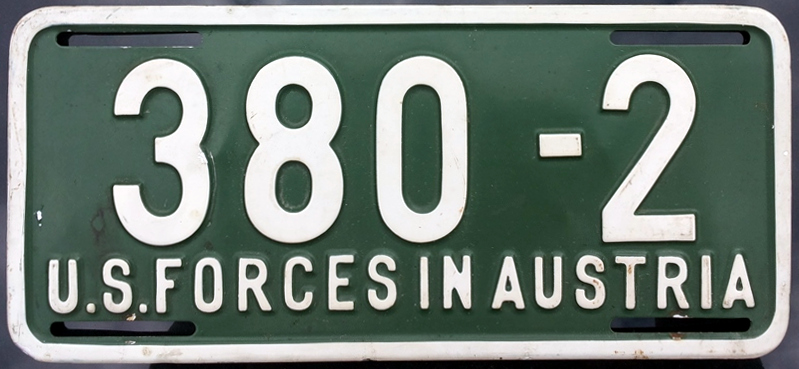
1954 occupation licence plate

From 1906 until 1919, the plates always composed one letter followed by Roman numerals and three numbers (e.g. "BXV 639"). The car in which Archduke Franz Ferdinand was assassinated, for example, bore the plate 'AIII 118'. His killing precipitated the First World War, which ended with the Armistice of 11/11/18 (11 November 1918), a coincidence noted by historians.

Temporary admission plates always followed by prefix. The prefixes are G= Bosnia and Herzegovina, U= Hungary, Z= All other countries.

From 1919 until 1930, the plates format is the same as before but became authority supplied.

From 1930 until 1939, the plates comprised one letter followed by five digits. (e.g. B 12345) The thousands of digits encoded the districts.

From 1939 until 1945, the plates comprised two letters followed by a hyphen and seven digits. (e.g. W-1234567) This followed the Nazi German system.

From 1945 until 1946, the plates comprised by a state coat of arms followed by maximum six numbers. They were only issued in the USSR-occupied zone.

From 1947 until 1989, the plates comprised one or two letters to indicate the state or federal code followed by up to six digits (e.g. W 123.456), the first number block was reserved for vehicles, the second one was the serial, when they ran out of serials they began to issue XX 999.A99. The background is black with white characters for private vehicles (unknown for all other vehicles). One or two letters are the prefixes set by state and federals, they are:

- B Burgenland
- BH Army (Bundesheer)
- G Graz
- K Carinthia (Karnten)
- L Linz
- N Lower Austria (Niederösterreich)
- O- Upper Austria (Oberösterreich; the dash after the letter 'O' is to prevent it being confused for the numeral 0)
- PT Post & Telekom Austria
- S Salzburg
- St Styria
- T Tirol
- V Vorarlberg
- W Vienna (Wien)

== Diplomatic codes ==
Code	Country
1	Vatican City
2	South Africa
3	Albania
4	Germany
5	United States
6	Saudi Arabia
7	Egypt
8	Argentina
9	Australia
11	Belgium
12	Brazil
13	Bulgaria
14	Canada
15	Chile
16	Colombia
17	South Korea
18	Cuba
19	Denmark
21	Luxembourg (formerly El Salvador?)
22	Spain
23	Finland
24	France
25	United Kingdom
26	Greece
27	Hungary
28	India
29	Indonesia
31	Iraq
32	Iran
33	Israel
34	Italy
35	Japan
36	Lebanon
37	Mexico
38	Norway
39	Sovereign Military Order of Malta
41	Pakistan
42	Panama
43	Netherlands
44	Peru
45	Poland
46	Portugal
47	Romania
48	Sweden
49	Switzerland
51	Czech Republic
52	Thailand
53	Turkey
54	Russia
55	Ukraine
56	Venezuela
57	Serbia (formerly Serbia and Montenegro?)
58	Ecuador
59	Tunisia
61	Morocco
62	Democratic Republic of the Congo (formerly Zaire)
63	Algeria (formerly Gabon?)
64	China
65	Syria
66	Libya
67	Costa Rica
68	Comprehensive Nuclear-Test-Ban Treaty Organization (formerly East Germany)
69	Guatemala
71	Ivory Coast
72	Malaysia
73	New Zealand
74	Philippines
75	Nigeria
76	Oman
77	Ireland
78	North Korea
79	Qatar
81	International Atomic Energy Agency
82	United Nations Industrial Development Organization
83	United Nations High Commissioner for Refugees
84	United Nations Office on Drugs and Crime
85	United Nations Relief and Works Agency for Palestine Refugees in the Near East
86	Nicaragua
87	International Atomic Energy Agency
88	Kuwait
89	United Nations Industrial Development Organization
91	Organization of the Petroleum Exporting Countries
92	International Organization for Migration
93	United Arab Emirates
94	Senegal
95	Jordan
96	OPEC Fund for International Development
97	Arab League
98	European Union
99	?
247	Organization for Security and Co-operation in Europe
515	Slovakia
532	Organization for Security and Co-operation in Europe
551	Vietnam
622	Kenya
623	Azerbaijan/ Namibia/ Zimbabwe???
624	Cape Verde
677	Ethiopia
678	Armenia
681	?
712	Slovenia
714	Croatia
718	North Macedonia
719	Kosovo
723	Montenegro
726	Estonia
728	Latvia
846	Malta
848	?
853	Tajikistan
854	Belarus
858	Kazakhstan
859	Georgia
872	China?
891	Angola
982	Cyprus
995	Bolivia
