= Vehicle registration plates of Colombia =

Colombia requires its residents to register their motor vehicles and display vehicle registration plates. The current plate design was introduced in the 1990s, but some of the previous 1972 through 1990 design remain in use. The current regular system uses black on yellow plates.

All vehicles are required to display plates, one on the front and one on the back. Peculiarly, in Colombia, commercial vehicles are also required to display plates on the sides. Those plates have a white background. This is usually done not with actual metal plates, but by a large decal of the license plate. This practice can also be found on taxis in neighboring Panama and Peru, but in Colombia all commercial vehicles and public transport vehicles must display them.

Plates use ABC-123 format, with the issuing city or department beneath.The initial prefix indicates the original region of registration.

== Current plate types ==
Category	Image	Type		Colors	Serial format	Legends
Category	Image	English	Spanish	Colors	Serial format	Legends
Passenger		Private	Particular	black on yellow	ABC·123	The municipality of issuance is embossed at the bottom of the plate. Plates issued in Bogotá until 1991 read "BOGOTA D.E." for Distrito Especial (Special District). In 1991 the city's name was changed to Santa Fé de Bogotá and plates began to read "STFE DE BOGOTA." In 2000 the city's name was changed yet again Bogotá, D.C. and those issued since read "BOGOTA D.C.". As of 2017 plates that say "BOGOTA D.E." are becoming quite rare and somewhat of a collector's item. Santa Fe plates are still somewhat common but are beginning to go the same way.
Passenger		Commercial	Comercial	black on white	ABC·123	
Non-passenger		Official	Oficial	white on green	OAB·123	
		Antique car	Auto antiguo	black on white with vertical blue stripes at left and right and blue graphic of an antique car at center	ABC·123	"ANTIGUO" is screened at the top of the plate and the municipality of issuance is embossed at the bottom of the plate.
		Motorcycle	Motocicleta	black on yellow	ABC·12F (current); ABC·12 without letter and A to E (previous, still in use).	"COLOMBIA" is embossed at the bottom of the plate.
		Auto rickshaw private	Mototaxi privado	black on yellow	123·ABC	"COLOMBIA" is embossed at the bottom of the plate.
		Auto rickshaw commercial	Mototaxi commercial	black on white	123·ABC	"COLOMBIA" is embossed at the bottom of the plate.
		Trailer	Remolque	white on green	R·12345	"COLOMBIA" is embossed at the bottom of the plate.
		Tank truck	Carrotanque	white on red	T·1234	"COLOMBIA" is embossed at the bottom of the plate.
Diplomatic		Consular corps	Cuerpo consular	white on blue	CC·1234	"COLOMBIA" is embossed at the bottom of the plate.
Diplomatic		Diplomatic corps	Cuerpo diplomático	white on blue	A-Z country initials ·123 FE-Schrift	"COLOMBIA" is embossed at the bottom of the plate.
Diplomatic		International organization	Organización internacional	white on blue	OI·1234	"COLOMBIA" is embossed at the bottom of the plate.
Diplomatic		Non-diplomatic staff	Servicio Administrativo y Técnico	white on blue	AT·1234	"COLOMBIA" is embossed at the bottom of the plate.
Armed Forces		Colombian Air Force	Fuerza Aérea Colombiana	yellow on black	FAC; 123456	"COLOMBIA" is embossed at the bottom of the plate.
Armed Forces		National Police	Policía Nacional	green on white	12-3456	"COLOMBIA" is screened at the top of the plate and "POLICIA NACIONAL" is screened at the bottom of the plate.

== Previous plate types ==
Category	Image	Type		Years	Colors	Serial format	Legends
Category	Image	English	Spanish	Years	Colors	Serial format	Legends
Passenger		Private	Particular	1972-1990	white on black	^{A}_{B} 1234	"COLOMBIA" is embossed at the bottom of the plate
Passenger		Commercial	Comercial	1972-1990	white on purple	^{A}_{B} 1234	"COLOMBIA" is embossed at the bottom of the plate
Non-passenger		Official	Oficial	1972-1990	yellow on black	^{O}_{A} 1234	"COLOMBIA" is embossed at the bottom of the plate
