= Nelson Building =

Building in Los Angeles, California

- Former U.S. Historic district – Contributing property
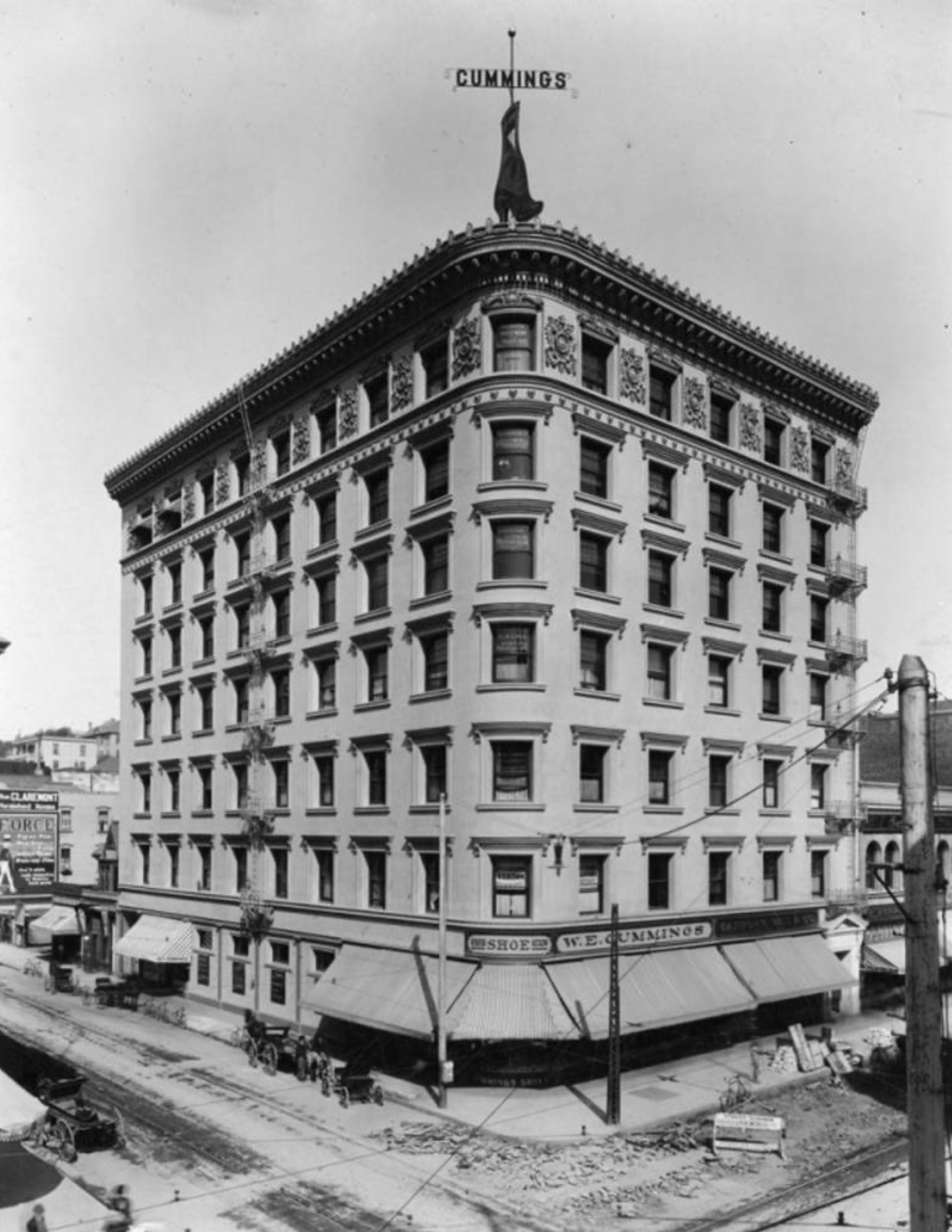
- The building in 1902

- Location within the Los Angeles metropolitan area
- Location: 355-359 S. Broadway and 305 W. 4th Street, Los Angeles, California
- Coordinates: 34°03′00″N 118°15′00″W
- Built: 1897
- Architect: Frank Van Trees; John Parkinson
- Part of: Broadway Theater and Commercial District (ID79000484)

Significant dates
- Designated CP: May 9, 1979
- Delisted CP: April 12, 2002

Nelson Building, also known as Grant Building, is a historic former high-rise located at 335-363 S. Broadway and 305 W. 4th Street in the Broadway Theater District in the historic core of downtown Los Angeles.

== History ==
Nelson Building was designed by Frank Van Trees for Col. J. D. Grant and built in 1897. The building, which housed both retail and offices, was equipped with elevators and electric services when it opened, making it very modern for its time. It was originally three stories in height.

In 1902, four additional stories were added to the building, giving it a total of seven. Weymouth Crowell built the addition based on plans from John Parkinson.

From 1947 to 1952, this building was home to the Philippine Consulate General in Los Angeles.

In 1979, the Broadway Theater and Commercial District was added to the National Register of Historic Places, with Nelson Building listed as a contributing property in the district. The building was reduced to two stories sometime between 1979 and 2005, and the building was removed from the register in 2002, the delisting noting that the building "appears to have been altered after the district was listed" and retains almost none of its historic character-defining features.

== Architecture and design ==
Nelson Building originally featured a Spanish design and was made of brick and plaster with a red-tile roof. The interior was originally finished with oak and marble.

When the building was expanded to seven stories, a terra cotta facade and a mass of ornamentation were also added. Subsequent alterations have removed the ornament, which was replaced by a plastered surface with a rounded corner. According to the United States Department of the Interior's 1979 contributing property designation, the building is plain in design but still blends well with the district, while that same department stated that the building retains almost none of its historic character-defining features when the building was delisted in 2002.

== See also ==
- List of contributing properties in the Broadway Theater and Commercial District
