= Jacinth Henry-Martin =

Kittitian diplomat and politician (b. 1961)

Jacinth Henry-Martin OBE

Ambassador of Saint Kitts and Nevis to the United States of America
- Incumbent
- Assumed office 2023
- In office 2011–2015

Permanent Representative of Saint Kitts and Nevis to the Organisation of American States
- Incumbent
- Assumed office 2023
- In office 2011–2015

Minister of Information, Culture, Youth and Sports
- In office 2000–2004
- Prime Minister: Denzil Douglas

Member of Parliament
- In office 2000–2004

Personal details
- Born: 28 July 1961 (age 65)
- Party: Saint Kitts and Nevis Labour Party

Jacinth Lorna Henry-Martin OBE (born 28 July 1961) is a Kittitian diplomat and former politician who has been the Ambassador of Saint Kitts and Nevis to the United States and Organisation of American States since 2023. From 2000 to 2004, she was a member of parliament and government minister.

== Early life and education ==
Henry-Martin was born in Sandy Point on 28 July 1961, and was educated at local schools and later completed her tertiary education in Basseterre. She then completed courses at the Centro Interamericano de Idiomas (CIDI) and the Centro Latinoamericano y del Caribe para el Desarrollo Cultural (CLACDEC). She also studied at the University of Westminster, where she received a master's degree in Technical & Specialized Translation.

== Political career ==
In the 2000 Saint Kitts and Nevis general election, Henry-Martin was elected as a Labour member of parliament representing the Sandy Point, Fig Tree, and La Valley constituency. Upon her election, she became the first woman to be elected to parliament for Labour. She also served in government as the Minister of Information, Culture, Youth and Sports. In the 2004 general election, she lost her seat.

== Diplomatic career ==
In 2005, Henry-Martin was appointed as the Saint Kitts and Nevis High Commissioner to the United Kingdom, serving in the role until 2008.

In 2011, Henry-Martin was appointed to serve as the Ambassador of Saint Kitts and Nevis to the United States and permanent representative to the Organisation of American States (OAS). She was the first woman to hold the position of St Kitts and Nevis ambassador to the US.

Following the 2015 election, she stood down from her diplomatic positions, and was subsequently appointed to serve as Chief of Staff to the general secretary of the OAS.

In 2023, she was appointed for a second time to be the Saint Kitts and Nevis Ambassador to the US and permanent representative to the OAS.

== Personal life ==
Henry-Martin is married and has three sons.

== Awards ==
- Office of the Most Excellent Order of the British Empire (OBE), 2025
- Inter-American Defense Board (IADB) Medal, 2025
