= 10th Summit of the Americas =

2026 international conference in the Dominican Republic

10th Summit of the Americas X Cumbre de las Américas
- Host country: Dominican Republic
- Date: 2026
- Cities: Punta Cana
- Follows: 9th Summit of the Americas

The Tenth Summit of the Americas is an upcoming international conference. It was originally scheduled to be held in Punta Cana, Dominican Republic, in December 2025; however, on 3 November 2025, the Dominican government announced that it would be postponed until 2026.

The chosen theme for the event is "Building a Secure and Sustainable Hemisphere with Shared Prosperity".

== Preparations and postponement ==
It was announced in 2023 that Punta Cana, Dominican Republic, would serve as host of the Tenth Summit.

The Dominican Foreign Ministry announced in October 2025 that Cuba, Nicaragua, and Venezuela would not be invited to the summit due to the lack of democracy in those countries. In October 2025 Mexican President Claudia Sheinbaum and Colombian President Gustavo Petro announced that they would not attend the 10th Summit of the Americas. The reasons they gave included the exclusion of those three countries.

On 3 November 2025, the Dominican Republic's Foreign Ministry announced that following a "careful analysis of the situation in the region", it had decided to postpone the Summit until an as yet unspecified date in 2026. The ministry's statement spoke of "deep divisions currently hindering a productive dialogue in the region" and the recent impact of severe weather events on several Caribbean states.

== Delegations ==
The participants at the Summits of the Americas are the heads of state and government of the countries of the Americas, along with their accompanying delegations.

Preceded by 9th Summit of the Americas	Summits of the Americas; 2026; Punta Cana, Dominican Republic	Succeeded by TBD
