= Consulate General of the Philippines, Los Angeles =

Diplomatic mission of the Philippines in Los Angeles, United States

Consulate General of the Philippines, Los Angeles Konsulado Panlahat ng Pilipinas sa Los Angeles

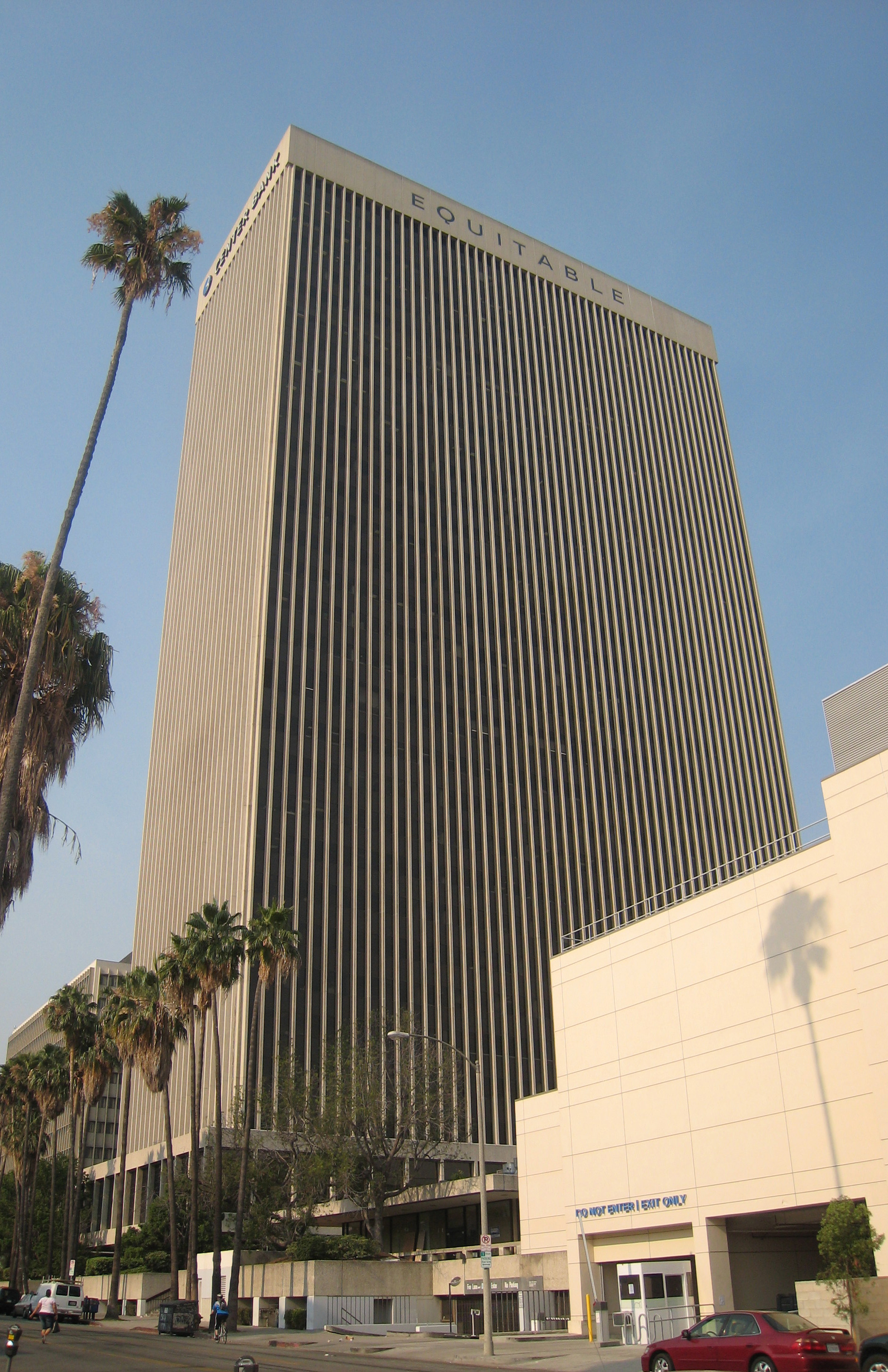
- Location: Los Angeles, California
- Address: 3435 Wilshire Boulevard, Suite 550
- Coordinates: 34°3′43.56″N 118°17′54.24″W
- Consul General: Adelio Angelito S. Cruz
- Website: losangelespcg.org

The Consulate General of the Philippines in Los Angeles is a diplomatic mission of the Republic of the Philippines in the United States, representing the country's interests in southern California. It is located on the fifth floor of the Equitable Life Building at 3435 Wilshire Boulevard in the Koreatown neighborhood of central Los Angeles, a couple of blocks north of the Robert F. Kennedy Community Schools.

== History ==
The Philippine Consulate General in Los Angeles was opened in 1947, initially as an extension office of the Philippine Consulate General in San Francisco. It was headed by Dr. Roberto Regala, the first Philippine consul to San Francisco, as titular consul, but administered by his vice-consul in the person of former Congressman Marcelo T. Boncan. This extension office founded by Regala and Boncan would later become its own mission in 1955 by executive order of President Ramon Magsaysay, becoming Los Angeles's 17th consulate general.

In the run-up to the People Power Revolution in 1986, two dozen people stormed the consulate, demanding the resignation of its employees, while marchers also protested outside. Two weeks later, the consulate's staff called on President Ferdinand Marcos to resign following the seizure of Camps Aguinaldo and Crame by Defense Minister Juan Ponce Enrile and General Fidel V. Ramos. When Marcos was ousted, supporters of his successor, Corazon Aquino, hung a large portrait of her in the consulate's offices, in addition to holding a rally outside. It continued to be a place for demonstrations afterward: pro-Marcos demonstrators rallied outside a few months after the People Power Revolution against Aquino's nine-day state visit to the United States. The consulate today remains a popular venue for demonstrations relating to issues in the Philippines: in 2016, a demonstration was held against Marcos's burial at the Libingan ng mga Bayani, while two years later, demonstrators protested outside the consulate against the arrest of Senator Antonio Trillanes.

During the 1989 Philippine coup attempt, a confrontation took place at the consulate between supporters of the Aquino administration and those supportive of the coup. Coup supporters also organized a candlelight vigil outside, subsequently leaving the premises after they were shouted out by supporters of the government.

== Chancery ==
The chancery of the Philippine Consulate General in Los Angeles was originally located at 355 South Broadway in the city's historic core. It later moved from Downtown to the Wilshire corridor in 1967, when it relocated to 3075 Wilshire Boulevard, across from Bullocks Wilshire.

Since then has been based out of different buildings along the corridor, with the consulate moving to its current location on March 2, 2015, relocating from its previous offices located four blocks west at 3600 Wilshire Boulevard.

== Staff and activities ==
The Philippine Consulate General in Los Angeles is headed by Consul General Adelio Angelito S. Cruz, who assumed his position on December 23, 2024 after also having previously served as consul general from 2016 to 2021.

As of 2025, the consulate's jurisdiction covers southern California, southern Nevada and Arizona. In California, the consulate also exercises jurisdiction over the honorary consulate in San Diego, and likewise maintained an extension office in Ventura at one point in its history. It also previously exercised jurisdiction over New Mexico and Texas until March 22, 2019, when both states were placed under the newly-reopened Philippine Consulate General in Houston.

The consulate has provided assistance to several high-profile Filipinos throughout its history, including former First Lady Imelda Marcos, actress Nora Aunor, former Agriculture Undersecretary Jocelyn Bolante, and Atong Ang, one of the co-accused in the plunder trial of Joseph Estrada.

Aside from providing consular services, the consulate has also experimented with various ways of reaching out to and supporting Filipinos within its jurisdiction. In 2005, the consulate launched a series of fundraisers to help pay for the expenses of Filipino American athletes participating in that year's Southeast Asian Games, while it has also supported Filipino cultural endeavors both in the Philippines and by the large Filipino American community in the Los Angeles area, such as hosting exclusive screenings for Ploning as part of its bid to win Best Foreign Language Film at the 81st Academy Awards.

In 2018, the consulate confirmed that it does not and would not report undocumented Filipinos applying for Philippine passports to the Department of Homeland Security.

== See also ==
- List of diplomatic missions of the Philippines
- List of diplomatic missions in Los Angeles
