= 2000 Saint Kitts and Nevis general election =

- 6 March 2000

11 of 15 seats in the National Assembly 6 seats needed for a majority
- Registered: 34,166
- Turnout: 64.24% (▼4.14pp)
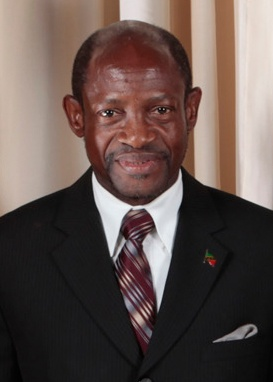

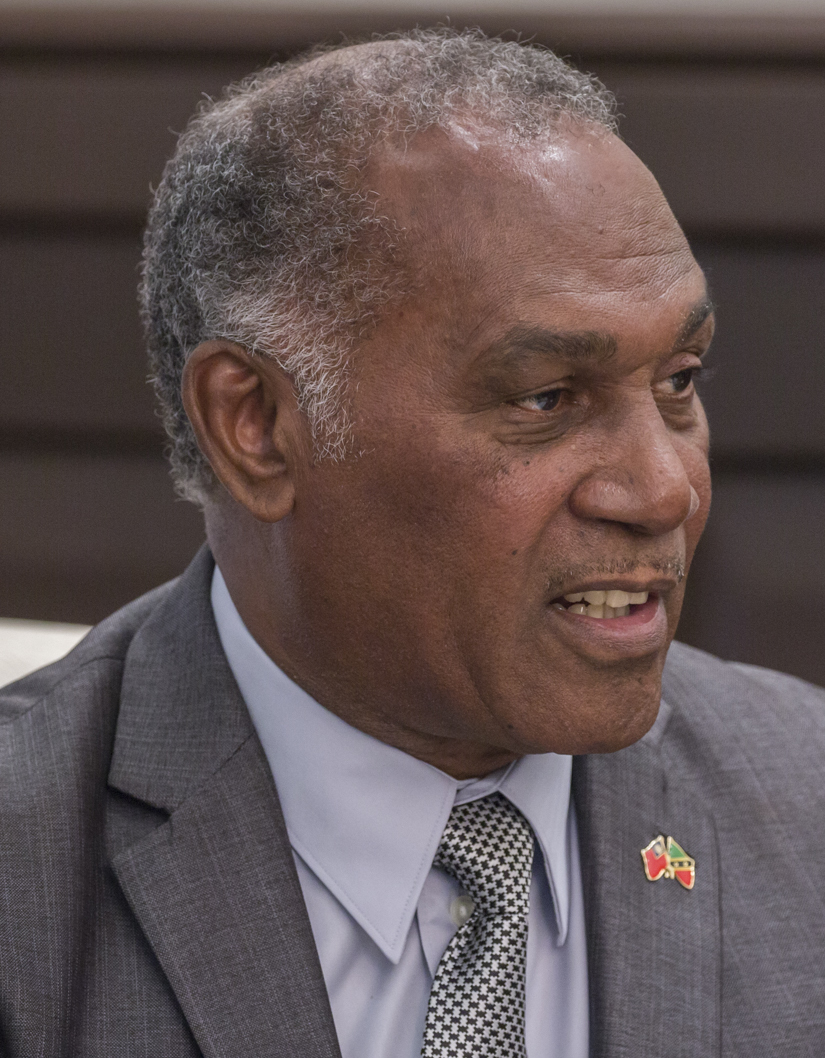

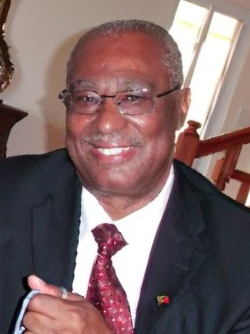
	First party	Second party	Third party
Leader	Denzil Douglas	Vance Amory	Joseph Parry
Party	SKNLP	CCM	NRP
Last election	49.58%, 7 seats	8.22%, 2 seats	7.03%, 1 seat
Seats won	8	2	1
Seat change	▲1	Steady	Steady
Popular vote	11,762	1,901	1,710
Percentage	53.85%	8.70%	7.83%
Swing	▲4.27pp	▲0.48pp	▲0.80pp
- Results by constituency
Prime Minister before election
Denzil Douglas
SKNLP
Elected Prime Minister
Denzil Douglas
SKNLP

General elections were held in Saint Kitts and Nevis on 6 March 2000. The result was a victory for the Saint Kitts and Nevis Labour Party, which won eight of the eleven directly-elected seats in the National Assembly. Voter turnout was 64.2%.

== Background and campaign ==
In February 2000, the prime minister of Saint Kitts and Nevis, Denzil Douglas, announced that there would be an election in March 2000, four months before a general election was constitutionally due. The Saint Kitts and Nevis Labour Party (SKNLP) under Douglas' leadership had governed since the 1995 election, when they had won a majority with 7 of 11 elected seats.

This was the first general election for the federation since the unsuccessful Nevisian independence referendum in 1998, leading Douglas to state in a campaign rally that if his party lost power to the People's Action Movement (PAM), it could lead to a PAM-led coalition with Nevisian parties and "instability and confusion" for the federation. The extradition of a notable alleged drug trafficker to the United States in February 2000 was seen by experts as being likely to boost the SKNLP's campaign. The PAM and its former prime minister Kennedy Simmonds criticised Labour's economic record and the level of government debt.

In Nevis, the Concerned Citizens' Movement leader and Nevis Premier Vance Amory campaigned on his claimed successes in government locally in Nevis.

== Results ==
Voting took place on 6 March 2000 and resulted in a landslide victory for the SKNLP, which won all eight seats on Saint Kitts and therefore held a majority in the National Assembly. Notably, PAM's only member of parliament and Leader of the Opposition, Hugh Heyliger, lost his seat to the SKNLP's Jacinth Henry-Martin. Turnout for the election was 64.2%.

Party	Votes	%	Seats	+/–
Saint Kitts and Nevis Labour Party	11,762	53.85	8	+1
People's Action Movement	6,468	29.61	0	–1
Concerned Citizens' Movement	1,901	8.70	2	0
Nevis Reformation Party	1,710	7.83	1	0
Appointed members			4	0
Total	21,841	100.00	15	0
Valid votes	21,841	99.51		
Invalid/blank votes	108	0.49		
Total votes	21,949	100.00		
Registered voters/turnout	34,166	64.24		
Source: Caribbean Elections
