= Thelma Phillip-Browne =

Saint Kitts and Nevis diplomat

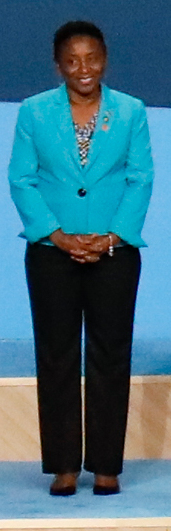
- Phillip-Browne in 2022

Ambassador of St. Kitts and Nevis to the United States of America
- In office 28 January 2016 – 6 August 2022
- Prime Minister: Timothy Harris

Personal details
- Born: Newtown, Basseterre, St. Kitts
- Education: University of the West Indies; Johns Hopkins Bloomberg School of Public Health; Cardiff University School of Medicine; Anderson University

Thelma Phillip-Browne is a Kittian dermatologist and diplomat. She was the Ambassador to the United States from Saint Kitts and Nevis from 28 January 2016 to 6 August 2022.

== Early life and education ==
Phillip-Browne was born in Newtown, Basseterre, St Kitts. She attended Girls High School and Basseterre High School before graduating with a medical degree from the University of the West Indies (UWI) in Jamaica in 1978. She then attended Johns Hopkins Bloomberg School of Public Health and earned a Diploma in Dermatological Science from the Cardiff University School of Medicine. She also obtained a Master of Theological Studies (MTS) degree from Anderson University in 2011.

== Career ==
Besides working as a dermatologist in private practice, she was Director of Primary Health Care and later Chief Medical Officer of the Federation of St Kitts and Nevis.

Phillip-Browne was appointed as Ambassador of St. Kitts and Nevis to the United States in 2015, serving from 28 January 2016 to 6 August 2022 and presenting her credentials to President of the United States Barack Obama on 28 January 2016. In 2016, Phillip-Browne was named one of "St.Kitts-Nevis' 40 most Influential and Powerful Women" by Times Caribbean Online.

In 2018, Phillip-Browne signed the 2018-2024 Multi-country Cooperation Strategy for Barbados and Eastern Caribbean Countries tot strengthen regional health services. In 2022, Phillip-Browne addressed the 9th Summit of the Americas in Los Angeles, California, and was featured in the webinar series “A Seat at the Table Women in Global Leadership”.

== Personal life ==
Phillip-Browne has served as a lay preacher and member of the Women of the Church of God. She has two daughters and one son, and has two granddaughters. She has seven siblings from her mothers 13 pregnancies.

Phillip-Browne was also a netball player and a member of the Caribbean Netball Association’s Championship Team in 1973.
