= Consulate General of the Philippines, San Francisco =

Diplomatic mission of the Philippines in San Francisco, United States

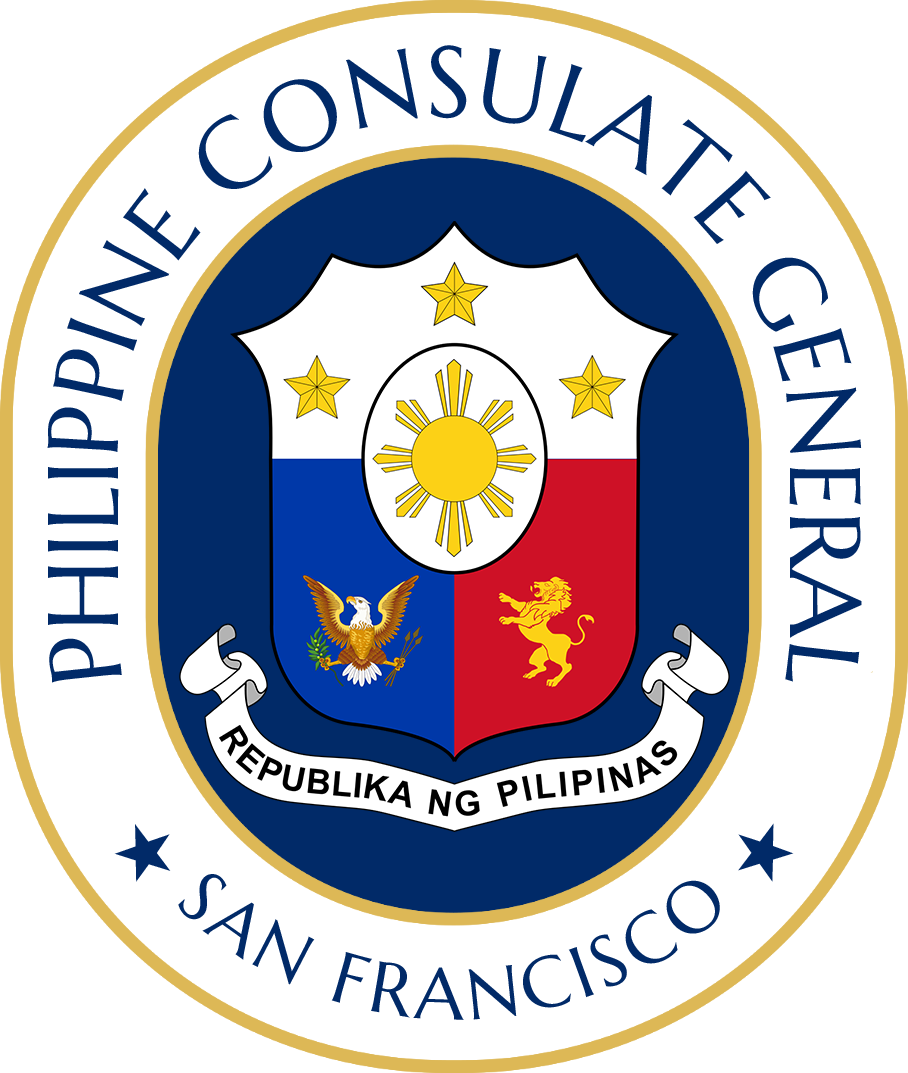
Consulate General of the Philippines, San Francisco Konsulado Panlahat ng Pilipinas sa San Francisco

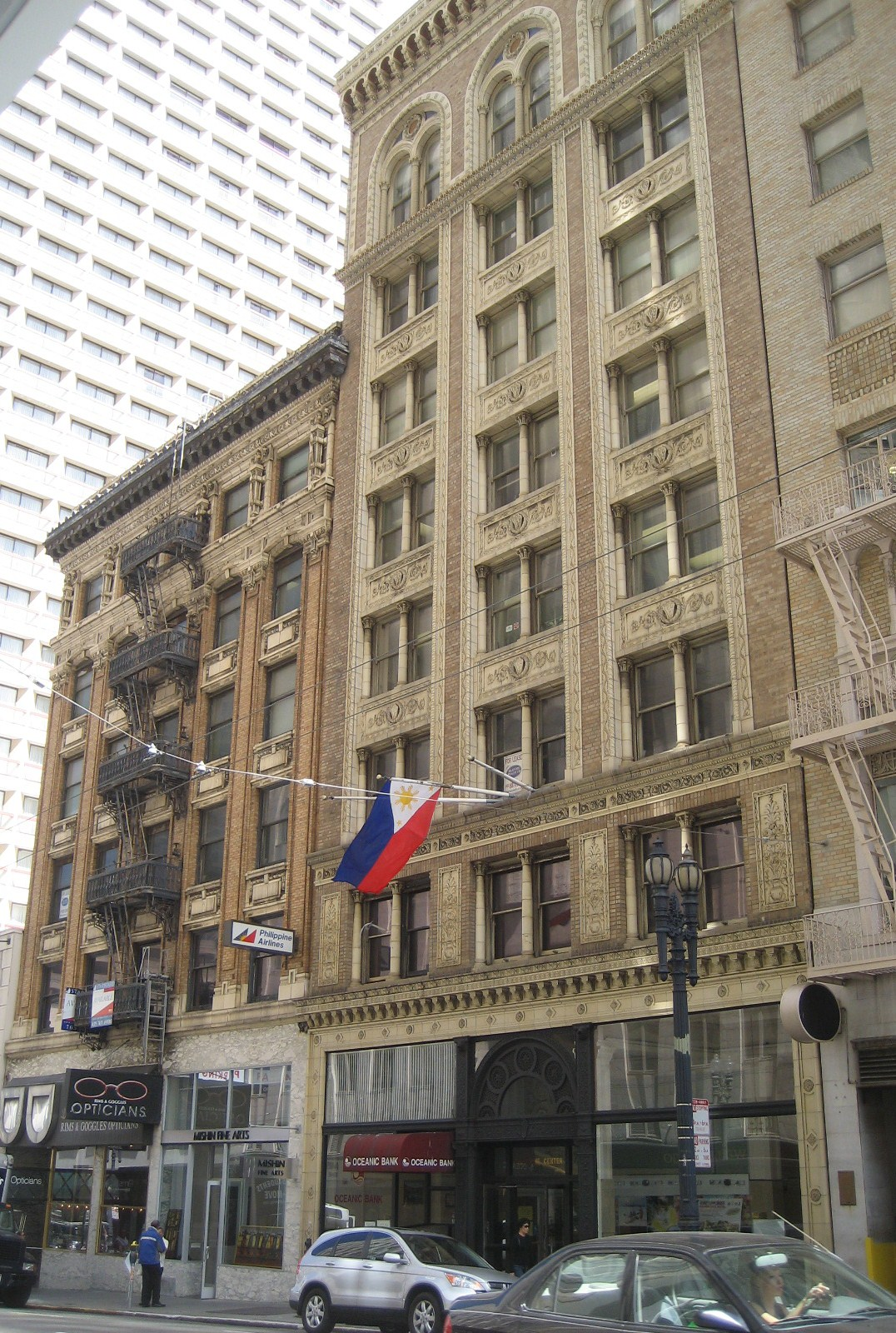
- Location: San Francisco, California
- Address: 447 Sutter Street
- Coordinates: 37°47′20.7″N 122°24′28.7″W
- Consul General: Neil Frank R. Ferrer
- Website: pcgsanfrancisco.org

The Consulate General of the Philippines in San Francisco is a foreign mission of the Republic of the Philippines in the United States, representing the country's interests in northern California. It is located at the Philippine Center at 447 Sutter Street in Downtown San Francisco, just north of Union Square.

== History ==
The Philippine Consulate General in San Francisco was opened in 1946 immediately after the United States recognized the independence of the Philippines, with Dr. Roberto Regala serving as the mission's first consul. The next year, it established an extension office in Los Angeles, also headed by Regala as titular consul, but administered by his vice-consul in the person of former Congressman Marcelo T. Boncan. This extension office founded by Regala and Boncan would later become its own mission in 1955.

During the 1970s and 1980s, protesters opposed to Ferdinand Marcos regularly demonstrated outside the consulate, and throughout his presidency the consulate, along with other missions in the United States, was perceived as teeming with agents loyal to the Marcos regime. When Marcos was ousted in the People Power Revolution in 1986, anti-Marcos demonstrators confronted the mission's staff outside on Sutter Street, eventually taking over the Consulate entirely. It continues to be a place for anti-government demonstrations today; demonstrators protest in front of the consulate during political events such as the annual State of the Nation Address of the sitting Philippine president.

In 2003, the Philippine government briefly contemplated selling the Consulate building, which elicited a strongly negative response from Max Soliven, founder of The Philippine Star, especially in light of the Philippine government's decision to sell during the presidency of Corazon Aquino a building facing Union Square housing the Philippine Airlines offices in San Francisco, which was sold at a significant loss.

== Staff and activities ==
The Philippine Consulate General in San Francisco is headed by Consul General Neil Frank R. Ferrer, who assumed his post in January 2021.

Currently, the consulate's jurisdiction covers northern and central California, northern Nevada, and the states of Washington, Oregon, Montana, Colorado, Idaho, Utah, Wyoming and Alaska. The Consulate holds regular consular missions in major cities within its jurisdiction, including in Anchorage, Denver, Portland, Reno, and Seattle.

== See also ==
- List of diplomatic missions of the Philippines
- List of diplomatic missions in San Francisco
