= List of diplomatic missions in Los Angeles =

This is a list of diplomatic missions in Los Angeles. Many foreign governments have established diplomatic and trade representation in the city of Los Angeles, California. Most of them are at the Consulate-General level; many of these are located along Wilshire Boulevard or on the Westside of Los Angeles. In addition, Los Angeles has a number of honorary consulates. This list is associated with the Los Angeles Consular Corps.

== Consulates Generals in Los Angeles ==
The Los Angeles County Office of Protocol lists the following Consulates Generals:

Country	Mission	Headed by	Address	Neighborhood	Image
Argentina	Consulate-General	Hector Maria Monacci	5055 Wilshire Boulevard, Suite 210	Hancock Park	
Australia	Consulate-General	Tanya Alexandra Bennett	2029 Century Park East, Suite 3150	Century City	
Austria	Consulate-General	Michael Postl	11859 Wilshire Boulevard, Suite 501	Brentwood	
Azerbaijan	Consulate-General	Ramil Gurbanov	11766 Wilshire Boulevard, Suite 1410	Sawtelle	
Bangladesh	Consulate-General	Priyatosh Saha	501 South Fairfax Ave	Beverly Grove	
Bahamas	Consulate-General	Joy Antinellie Newbold	10877 Wilshire Boulevard, Suite 600	Westwood	
Belgium	Consulate-General	Sophie Fabienne Hottat	6300 Wilshire Boulevard, Suite 1200	Carthay	
Belize	Consulate-General	Yvette Karen Gentle	4801 Wilshire Boulevard, Suite 250	Hancock Park	
Bolivia	Consulate-General		3701 Wilshire Boulevard, Suite 1065	Koreatown	
Brazil	Consulate-General	Fatima Keiko Ishitani	6222 Wilshire Boulevard, Suite 600	Carthay	
Bulgaria	Consulate-General	Boyko Aleksandrov Hristov	11766 Wilshire Boulevard, Suite 440	Sawtelle	
Burma	Consulate-General	Zaw Linn Maung	3435 Wilshire Boulevard, Suite 1590	Koreatown	
Canada	Consulate-General	Zaib Shaikh	550 South Hope Street, 9/F	Downtown	
Chile	Consulate-General	Francisco Javier Leal Lisboa	6100 Wilshire Boulevard, Suite 575	Carthay	
China	Consulate-General	Guo Shaochun	443 Shatto Place	Koreatown	
Croatia	Consulate-General	Renee Pea	11766 Wilshire Boulevard, Suite 1250	Sawtelle	
Czech Republic	Consulate-General	Jaroslav Olša, Jr.	10990 Wilshire Boulevard, Suite 1100	Westwood	
Ecuador	Consulate-General	Cesar Gustavo Anda Sevilla	3600 Wilshire Boulevard, Suite 1404	Koreatown	
Egypt	Consulate-General	Hossam Eldeen Aly	6300 Wilshire Boulevard, Suite 1890	Carthay	
El Salvador	Consulate-General	Alejandro Letona Alvarado	3250 Wilshire Boulevard, Suite 550	Koreatown	
Finland	Consulate-General	Okko-Pekka Salmimies	11766 Wilshire Boulevard, Suite 250	Sawtelle	
France	Consulate-General	Julie Bedos	10390 Santa Monica Boulevard, Suite 410	Century City	
Germany	Consulate-General	Andrea Sasse	6222 Wilshire Boulevard Suite 500	Carthay	
Greece	Consulate-General	Christina Valassopoulou	12424 Wilshire Boulevard, Suite 1170	Sawtelle	
Guatemala	Consulate-General	Jose Arturo Rodriguez Diaz	1975-1989 Riverside Drive	Echo Park	
Honduras	Consulate-General	Semma Julissa Gutierrez Villanueva	3550 Wilshire Boulevard, Suite 918	Koreatown	
Hungary	Consulate-General	Tamás Széles	11766 Wilshire Boulevard, Suite 410	Sawtelle	
India	Consulate-General	Kotehal Jayadevappa Srinivasa	707 Wilshire Boulevard	Financial District	
Indonesia	Consulate-General	Purnomo Ahmad Chandra	3457 Wilshire Boulevard, 4th Floor	Koreatown	
Iraq	Consulate-General	Salwan Rodhan	4500 Wilshire Boulevard	Mid-Wilshire	
Ireland	Consulate-General	Marcella Ann Smyth	6300 Wilshire Boulevard, Suite 1440	Carthay	
Israel	Consulate-General	Israel Bachar	11766 Wilshire Boulevard, Suite 1600	Sawtelle	
Italy	Consulate-General	Raffaella Valentini	12424 Wilshire Boulevard, Suite 1400	Sawtelle	
Japan	Consulate-General	Kosei Murota	350 South Grand Avenue, Suite 1700	Downtown	
Kenya	Consulate-General	Thomas Kwaka Omolo	3550 Wilshire Boulevard, Suite 1900	Koreatown	
Lebanon	Consulate-General	Bachir Sarkis	811 Wilshire Boulevard, Suite 1800	Downtown	
Lithuania	Consulate-General	Sandra Brikaitė	11766 Wilshire Boulevard, Suite 560, Landmark II	Sawtelle	
Malaysia	Consulate-General	Anil Fahriza Binti Adenan	777 South Figueroa Street, Floor 6	Downtown	
Mexico	Consulate-General	Carlos González Gutiérrez	2401 West 6th Street	Westlake	
Pakistan	Consulate-General	Asim Ali Khan	10700 Santa Monica Boulevard, Suite 211	West Los Angeles	
Paraguay	Consulate-General	Manuel Alcibiades Ruiz Diaz	3600 Wilshire Boulevard, Suite 414	Koreatown	
Peru	Consulate-General	José Luis Chávez Gonzales	3450 Wilshire Boulevard, Suite 800	Koreatown	
Philippines	Consulate-General	Edgar Barrairo Badajos	3435 Wilshire Boulevard, Suite 550	Koreatown	
Poland	Consulate-General	Tomasz Polewaczyk	12400 Wilshire Boulevard, Suite 555	Sawtelle	
Romania	Consulate-General	Lucia Sava	11766 Wilshire Boulevard, Suite 200	Sawtelle	
Saint Kitts and Nevis	Consulate-General	Bassam Alghanim	10436 Santa Monica Boulevard, Suite 3050, #3	Century City	
Saudi Arabia	Consulate-General	Bandar Fahad Al Zaid	12400 Wilshire Boulevard, Suite 700	Sawtelle	
South Africa	Consulate-General	Thandile Babalwa Sunduza	6300 Wilshire Boulevard, Suite 600	Carthay	
South Korea	Consulate-General	Youngwan Kim	3243 Wilshire Boulevard	Koreatown	
Spain	Consulate-General	Gerardo Fueyo Bros	5055 Wilshire Boulevard, Suite 860	Hancock Park	
Sri Lanka	Consulate-General	Lalith Priyalal Chandradasa	3250 Wilshire Boulevard, Suite 2180	Koreatown	
Thailand	Consulate-General	Tor Saralamba	611 North Larchmont Boulevard, 2nd Floor	Hollywood	
UAE	Consulate-General		1901 Avenue of the Stars, Suite 350	Century City	
United Kingdom	Consulate-General	Emily Cloke	2029 Century Park East, Suite 1350	Century City	

=== Beverly Hills ===
Country	Mission	Headed by	Address	City	Image
Colombia	Consulate-General	Olga Cielo Molina De La Villa	8383 Wilshire Boulevard, Suite 930	Beverly Hills	
Costa Rica	Consulate-General	Ana Elena Rojas Alvarez	8383 Wilshire Boulevard, Suite 641	Beverly Hills	
Kuwait	Consulate-General	Nawaf AlSaied	130 South El Camino Drive	Beverly Hills	
Qatar	Consulate-General	Mansoor Abdulla Al Sulaitin	150 South Rodeo Drive, Suite 250	Beverly Hills	
Turkey	Consulate-General	Sinan Kuzum	8500 Wilshire Boulevard, Suite 900	Beverly Hills	

=== Glendale, California ===
The Armenian Consulate is located in Glendale due to that city's significant Armenian population.

Country	Mission	Headed by	Address	City	Image
Armenia	Consulate-General	Karen Israyelyan	346 North Central Avenue	Glendale	
Dominican Republic	Consulate-General	Alfonso Rodriguez Zorrilla	500 North Brand Boulevard, Suite 960	Glendale	

=== Long Beach, California ===
Panama's consolate operates out of Long Beach.

Country	Mission	Headed by	Address	City	Image
Panama	Consulate-General	Gilda Isabel Garcia Lopez	111 W. Ocean Blvd., Suite 1570	Long Beach	

=== Santa Monica ===
New Zealand's consulates operate out of Santa Monica.

Country	Mission	Headed by	Address	City	Image
New Zealand	Consulate-General	Jeremy Clarke-Watson	2425 Olympic Boulevard, Suite 600E	Santa Monica	

== Representative offices ==
Country	Mission	Headed by	Address	Neighborhood	Image
Republic of China (Taiwan)	Economic and Cultural Office		3731 Wilshire Boulevard	Koreatown	

== Honorary consulates ==
Los Angeles has a number of honorary consulates. Many of them are from smaller Caribbean, European, or Pacific countries that do not have full consulates.

- Cambodia (Office in Long Beach)
- Cyprus
- Denmark
- Estonia
- Guinea (Office in Santa Monica)
- Guyana (Office in Burbank)
- Iceland
- Latvia (Office in Newport Beach)
- Liechtenstein
- Luxembourg
- Mali (Office in Altadena)
- Malta (Office in Moorpark)
- Marshall Islands (Office in Alhambra)
- Mauritius (Office in Costa Mesa)
- Monaco (Office in Universal City)
- Montenegro (Office in Beverly Hills)
- Morocco (Office in San Marino)
- Netherlands
- Norway
- Palau (Office in La Canada Flintridge)
- Papua New Guinea (Office in Fallbrook)
- Portugal (Office in Artesia)
- Saint Vincent and the Grenadines
- Sierra Leone (Office in Hawthorne)
- Slovakia
- Sweden
- Switzerland
- Togo
- Trinidad and Tobago (Office in Inglewood)

== Consulates in San Francisco (and Bay Area) with jurisdiction in Los Angeles ==
- Algeria
- Denmark
- Georgia
- Kazakhstan
- Luxembourg
- Mongolia
- Nepal
- Netherlands
- Norway
- Portugal
- Singapore
- Sweden
- Switzerland
- Tonga
- Ukraine
- Uruguay
- Vietnam

== Closed missions ==
- Barbados - closed in 2005
- Norway - closed in 2009
- Sweden (Consulate-General) – closed in 2009
- Ethiopia - closed in 2021
- Uruguay - closed in 2021 (Office was in Beverly Hills)
- Afghanistan - closed in 2022
- Nicaragua - closed in 2024
