= Los Angeles Consular Corps =

The Los Angeles Consular Corps (LACC) is an informal organization made up of the international consulates located in Los Angeles, California.

The Consular Corps promotes positive diplomatic relationships between the 105 countries that maintain consulates in Los Angeles through regular meetings, luncheons, special events, and publicizing national days which celebrate various independence days and holidays in member nations. LACC also hosts monthly luncheons and events that allow various Consuls to engage with the culture of Los Angeles and share their home countries' culture as well.

Los Angeles has the second largest consular community in the world, after New York City, with 105 countries currently maintaining a consulate in the city of Los Angeles. The majority of these consulates have jurisdiction over the regions of Southern California, while some serve the entire state of California, and other parts of the Western United States.

== Location of consulates ==
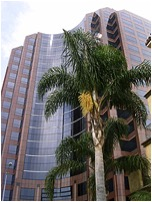
11766 Wilshire in Brentwood, home to several consulates

The majority of the Consulates in Los Angeles are located in the Wilshire corridor, throughout West L.A., Beverly Hills, and Koreatown. Some consulates are located as far west as Brentwood while a number of consulates are centered in Downtown Los Angeles.

Several consulates are also located in the nearby cities of Glendale (Armenia) and Santa Monica (New Zealand and Uruguay), immediately adjacent to the City of Los Angeles.

== Leadership ==
As of November 2024, leadership of the Los Angeles Consular Corps was as follows:

- Dean: Hon. Zaib Shaikh, Consul General of Canada
- First Vice Dean: Hon. Thandile, Consul General of South Africa
- Second Vice Dean: Jaak Treiman of Estonia
- Secretary: Mame Toucouleur Mbaye of Senegal
- Treasurer: Franco Zimmerli of Switzerland
- Members at Large:
  - Hon. Ahmed Mohamed Osman Shaheen, Consul General of Egypt
  - Hon. Samia Anjum, Consul General of Bangladesh
  - Juris Bunkis of Latvia
  - Abdelhak Saoud of Morocco

== Government relationships ==
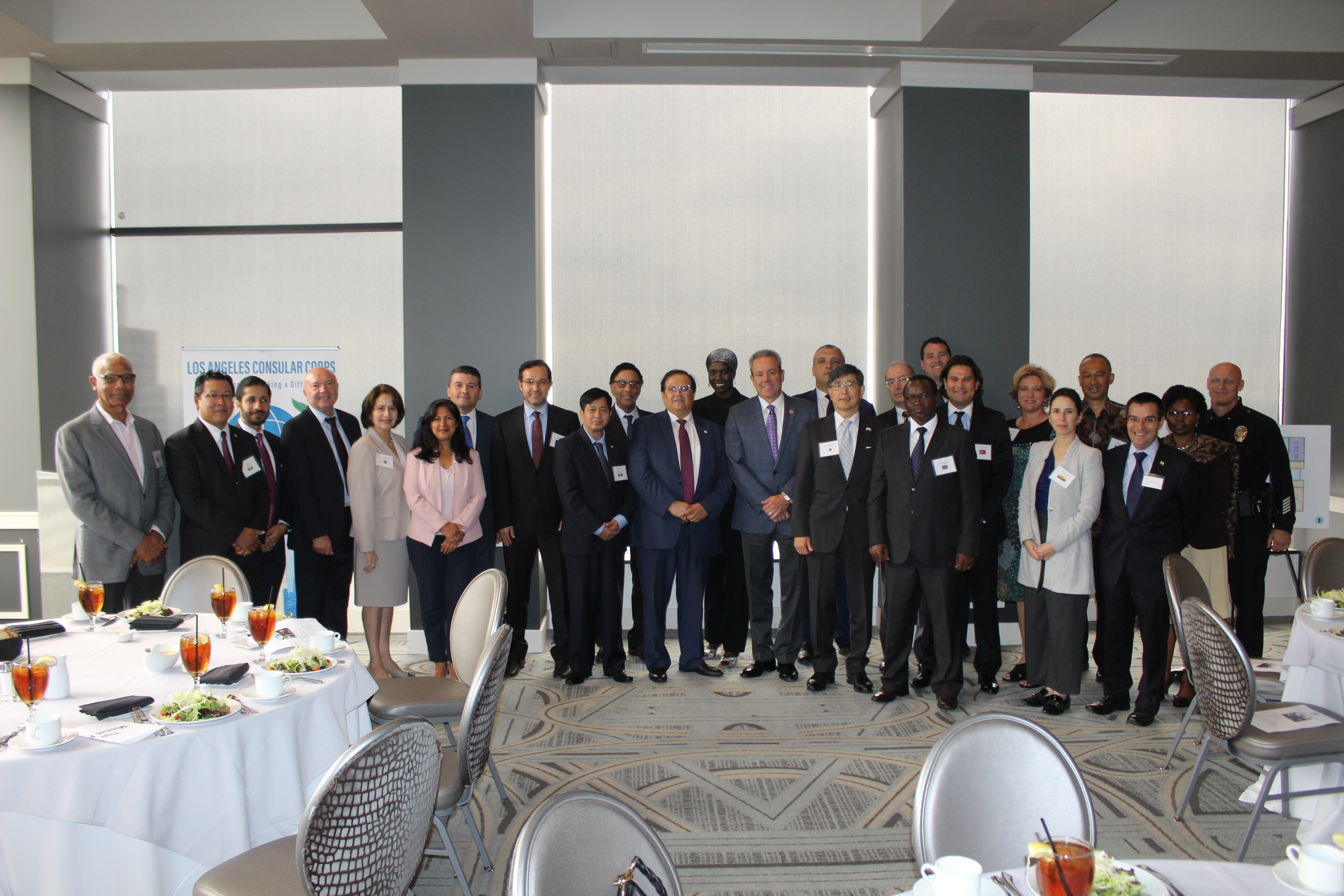
LAPD Chief Michel Moore at a 2019 LACC meeting

The government offices responsible for dealing with the foreign consulates in Los Angeles are:

- The Los Angeles County Office of Protocol
- The City of Los Angeles Office of Protocol, in Mayor Karen Bass' office.
- International Trade Office, Office of the Mayor of Los Angeles
- The International Protocol Office of Governor Gavin Newsom
- The U.S. Department of State office in Los Angeles (11000 Wilshire Blvd.)

== LACC Membership ==
The Los Angeles Consular Corps includes representatives from over 100 nations, including the following countries:

- Armenia
- Azerbaijan
- Canada
- China
- Israel
- Lebanon
- Mexico
- Saudi Arabia
- South Korea
- Spain
- Togo
- Thailand

Additionally, the Los Angeles Consular Corps includes foreign trade missions, foreign commercial offices:

- The Trade Office of Taiwan in Los Angeles 首頁 - 駐洛杉磯台北經濟文化辦事處 Taipei Economic and Cultural Office in Los Angeles
- The Brazilian Chamber of Commerce of California
- The Trade Council of Spain
- The Danish Business Council
- Québec Government Offices - Los Angeles and Silicon Valley Québec Government Office in Los Angeles | Gouvernement du Québec

See here for a full list of diplomatic missions in Los Angeles

== Los Angeles Global Importance ==
In terms of international affairs, Los Angeles is particularly unique because it is neither a national capital (or even a state capital), nor headquarters for a major international organization such as the UN, nor a major financial center (such as Sydney, Shanghai, and Frankfurt) and still has attracted over one hundred foreign consulates. While New York City is home to the United Nations and thus a formal presence from every world country, Los Angeles represents a global cultural hub and thus the international community voluntarily chooses to locate consulates throughout the city.

Los Angeles offers an important and strategic location: being inside the United States, in the major state of California, and at the crossroads of both Asia and Latin America. Its location on the Pacific Rim makes it an obvious choice for most countries to locate its consulate. Also, Los Angeles boasts one of the busiest major airports in the world: LAX, also the Port of Los Angeles is the largest maritime port in the United States, and North America, and is the 4th largest in the world. Los Angeles is the largest city in California, and the second largest in the U.S., and is the world's capital for entertainment. Many factors make Los Angeles an important place on the global stage. The Los Angeles customs district is the largest in the U.S. in terms of international trade capital and volume.

Demographically, Los Angeles is one of the most ethnically diverse regions in the world. With nearly 300 languages spoken, and the largest communities of Koreans, Armenians, Persians, Filipinos, Taiwanese, Guatemalans, Mexicans, and Canadians outside their respective countries of origin, L.A. is a cosmopolitan and international melting pot.
