= List of ambassadors of Saint Kitts and Nevis to the United States =

Coordinates: 38.933056°N 77.085833°W

Ambassador of Saint Kitts and Nevis to the United States Caribbean Chancery in Washington, D.C.
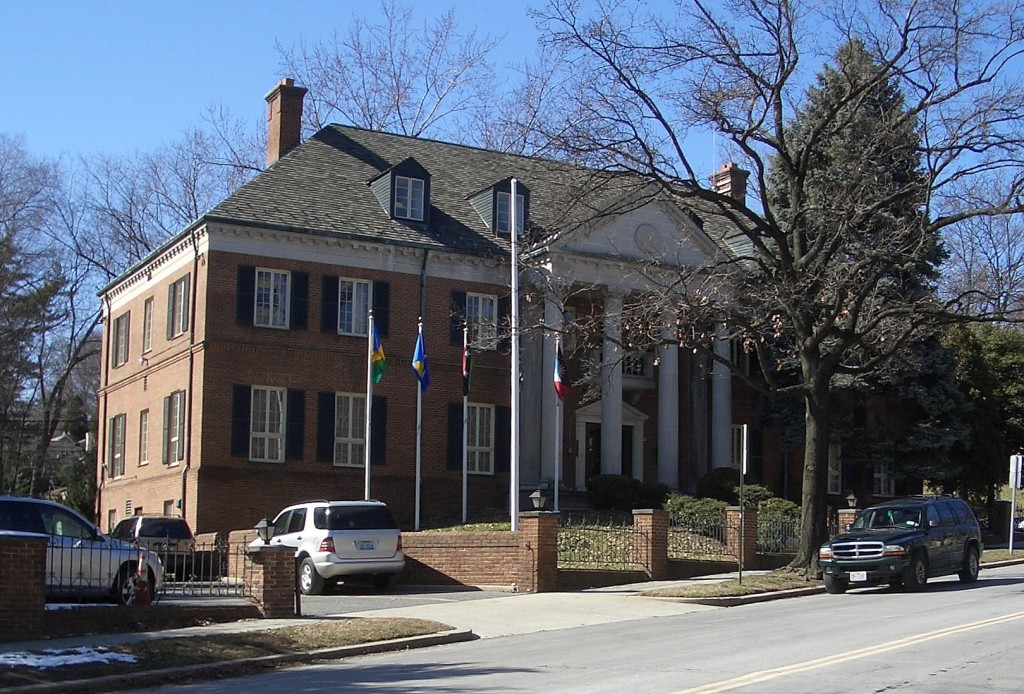
- Inaugural holder: William Valentine Herbert
- Formation: March 13, 1984

The Kittitian and Nevisian ambassador in Washington, D. C. is the official representative of the Government in Basseterre to the Government of the United States.

== List of representatives ==
Diplomatic agrément	Diplomatic accreditation	Ambassador	Observations	List of prime ministers of Saint Kitts and Nevis	List of presidents of the United States	Term end
September 19, 1983		Gained independence from the United Kingdom		Kennedy Simmonds	Ronald Reagan	
February 22, 1984	March 13, 1984	William Valentine Herbert		Kennedy Simmonds	Ronald Reagan	
August 11, 1994		Erstein Mallet Edwards		Denzil Douglas	Bill Clinton	
March 18, 1997	May 14, 1997	Osbert Wordsworth Liburd		Denzil Douglas	Bill Clinton	
July 10, 2001	July 31, 2001	Izben Cordinal Williams		Denzil Douglas	George W. Bush	
February 14, 2011	February 23, 2011	Jacinth Henry-Martin		Denzil Douglas	Barack Obama	February 18, 2015
March 27, 2015	January 28, 2016	Thelma Phillip-Browne		Timothy Harris	Barack Obama	August 6, 2022
July 7, 2023	September 15, 2023	Jacinth Henry-Martin		Terrance Drew	Joe Biden	In Office
