= Consular corps =

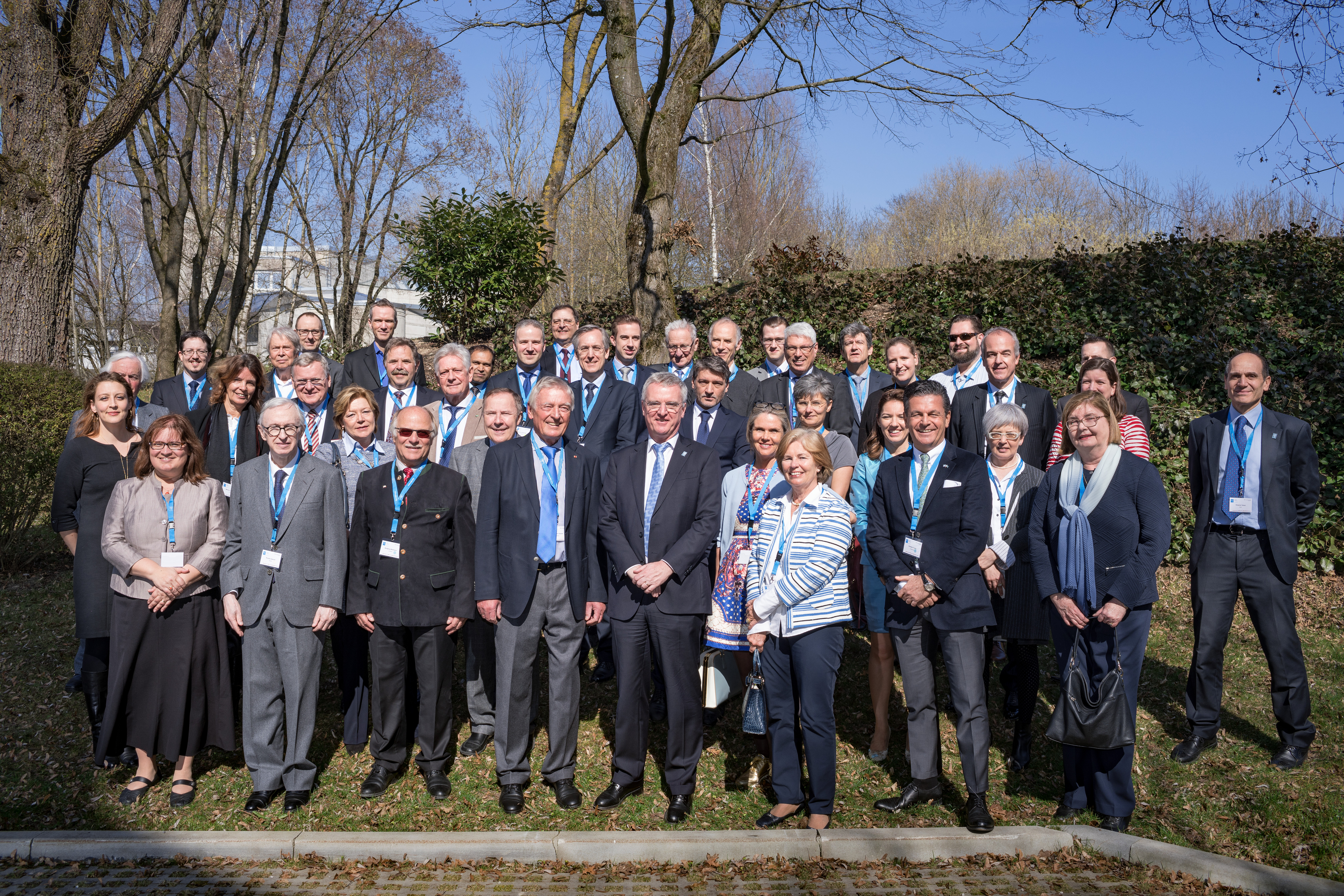
Members of the Consular Corps in Bavaria at the European Southern Observatory Headquarters.

Consular corps (from French: Corps consulaire and commonly abbreviated CC) is a concept analogous to diplomatic corps, but concerning the staff, estates and work of a consulate.

"While ambassadors and diplomatic staff are devoted to bettering all categories of the bilateral relationship with the host country, the consular corps is in charge of looking after their own foreign nationals in the host country."

== See also ==
- Los Angeles Consular Corps
- Rogers Act
