= Bermen =

Bermen may refer to:

- Claude de Bermen de la Martinière (1636–1719), senior official in New France (Quebec, Canada)
- Claude-Antoine de Bermen de La Martinière (1700–1761), Quebec-born son of Claude de Bermen de la Martinière
- Laurent Bermen (fl. 1647-1649), notary at Quebec
- Lake Bermen, lake in the province of Quebec, Canada

== See also ==
- Bremen
