= Robert de Longvilliers =

Robert de Longvilliers de Poincy

Governor of Saint Christophe (appointed, did not govern)
- In office 1644–1645
- Preceded by: Phillippe de Longvilliers de Poincy
- Succeeded by: Phillippe de Longvilliers de Poincy

Governor of Saint Martin
- In office 1648–1651
- Preceded by: Pierre Belain d'Esnambuc
- Succeeded by: Phillippe de Longvilliers de Poincy

Personal details
- Born: 1611
- Died: 1 April 1666 (aged 54–55) Pointe Sable, Saint Christophe
- Occupation: Soldier, colonial administrator

Robert de Longvilliers de Poincy (or Lonvilliers; 1611 – 1 April 1666) was the first commander of Trois-Rivières in New France from 1634 to 1636 (also called Laviolette at that time) and a French local governor of Saint Christophe and Saint Martin in the French Antilles. His uncle, Phillippe de Longvilliers de Poincy, was commander of the French colonies in the Antilles from 1639 to 1651, then commander of the colonies of Saint Christophe, Saint Croix, Saint Barthélemy, and Saint Martin for the Knights of Malta. Longvilliers reestablished French control of the northern part of Saint Martin after the Spanish withdrew and the Dutch tried to take over the whole island.

== Family ==
Robert de Longvilliers de Poincy was born in 1611. The Poincy family derived from Jean de Longvilliers, seigneur de Longvilliers, two leagues from Montreuil-sur-Mer, who founded the seigneury of Poincy in Brie near Meaux. His son, Jean II, captain of a company in the army, married Sophie de Choiseul on 18 November 1586. They had three children, Charlotte (born c. 1570), Christophe (born 1576) and Philippe (born 1584). Phillippe de Longvilliers de Poincy, the younger son, became a squadron commander, commander of the Order of Malta, and Lieutenant general of the French Antilles. He did not marry and died on Saint Christophe on 11 April 1860.

The older son, Christophe de Longvilliers de Poincy, married Marie-Catherine de Joigny in 1608 and after 42 years of military service died in Poincy around 1636. He had five children. The first was Philippe, who became local governor of Saint Christophe and married Anne-Marie de Rossignal, daughter of one of the richest colonists of that island. The second was Robert, the subject of this article. The others were Charles, sieur de Tréval, Louise and Henri, sieur de Bénévent.

== Saint Christophe (1639–48) ==
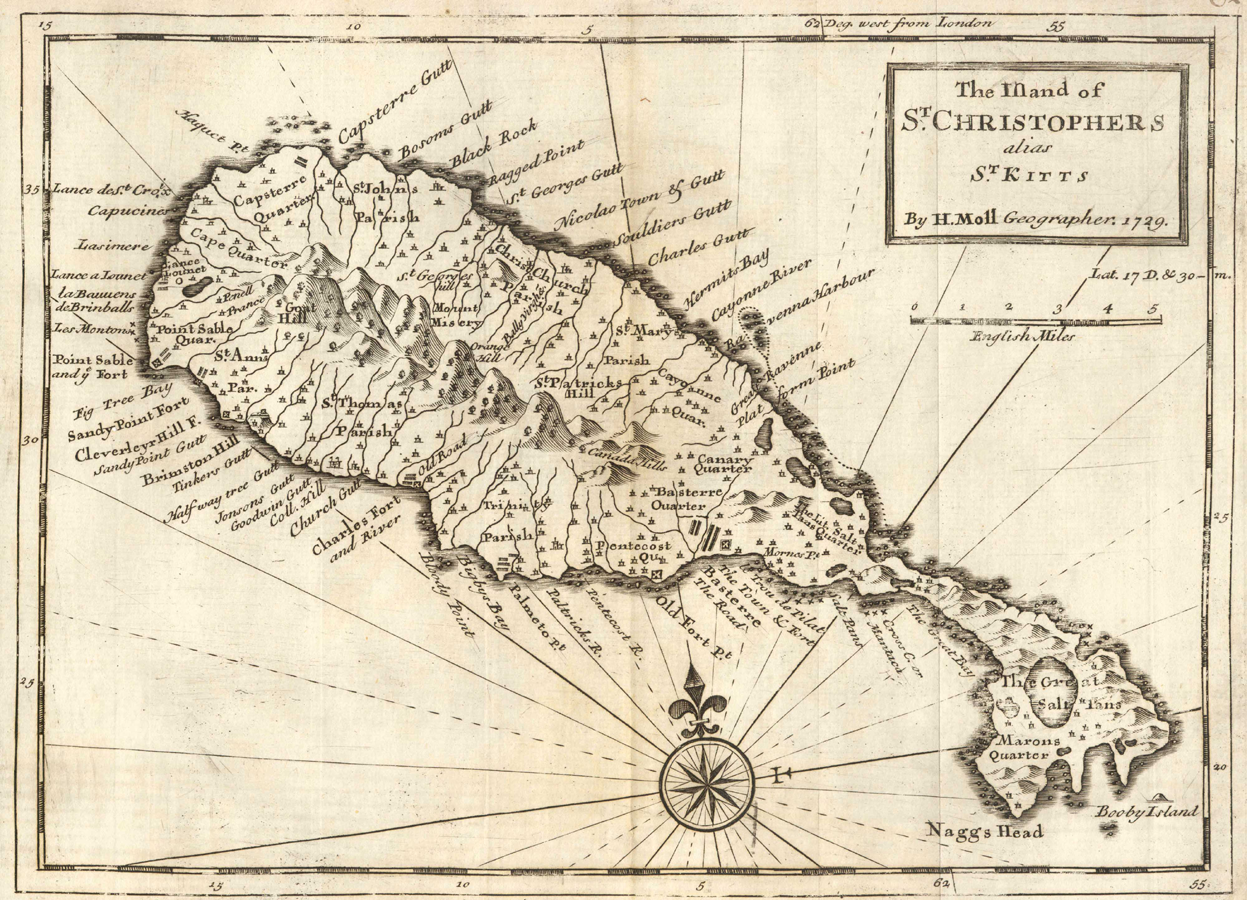
Saint Christophe (1729)

A treaty of 17 May 1627 had partitioned Saint Christopher Island. The English had the center part around Fort Charles and the French had the north part around Pointe de Sable (Sandy Point) and the south around Basseterre. Robert de Longvilliers came to Saint Christophe with his uncle Phillippe de Poincy in 1639. They sailed from France on 11 January 1639 on Le Petite Europe and arrived in Martinique on 11 February 1639, where the governor Jacques Dyel du Parquet promised his obedience. Poincy landed in Guadeloupe on 17 February 1639, where he met the governor Charles Liénard de L'Olive, then went on the Saint Christophe. There he found that his lieutenant René de Béthoulat de La Grange-Fromenteau had not prepared a house for him, but had only looked after himself. Poincy bought the Grande Montagne property on Saint Christophe and at once subdivided it and sold about 20 lots between 1639 and 1640. He charged seigneurial rents of 1-10 pigs and 1-5 capons per year. The transactions were all done in the name of his nephew, Robert de Longvilliers, who also bought property for himself.

Poincy was a quarrelsome man and a harsh authoritarian and earned many enemies. The company therefore decided to terminate his commission and look for a replacement. Noël Patrocles de Thoisy was chosen as the governor general to replace Poincy. The company appointed Thoisy governor general on 26 December 1644. On 16 February 1645 the company arranged for a lettre de cachet from the king that ordered Poincy to return to France. Poincy's nephew, Robert de Longvilliers, who was ready to embark at La Rochelle, was handed the order to be delivered personally to Poincy. Poincy received the order to return on 13 March 1645. In July 1645 he expelled the intendant general, Clerselier de Leumont, who retired to Guadeloupe, and sent his most troublesome opponents back to France.

French colonies in the Lesser Antilles

In August 1645 the king issued another lettre de cachet in which he ordered Poincy to leave Saint Christophe. Robert de Longvilliers was confirmed as governor of Saint Christophe. On 1 September 1645 the assembly of lords of the company directed Robert de Longvilliers, governor of Saint Christophe, to receive Noël Patrocles de Thoisy as the king's lieutenant general for the American islands. Thoisy left Le Havre on 16 September 1645, reached Martinique on 16 November and on 23 November was off Saint Christophe, but neither Poincy or the English governor would recognise him. In January 1646 Thoisy, with the support of Governor Jacques Dyel du Parquet of Martinique, led an expedition against Poincy and captured Poincy's two nephews (Longvilliers and Tréval). Poincy's forces, supported by militia provided by the English governor Thomas Warner, then defeated the company from Martinique at the cost of 60 deaths. Du Parquet was taken prisoner. Thoisy escaped to Guadeloupe.

On 16 and 28 October 1646 the king ordered Poincy and Thoisy to exchange prisoners, thus implicitly giving Poincy an amnesty for his revolt since he was opposed to the company and its abuses rather than opposed to the king. On 17 January 1647 Thoisy was arrested by the people of Martinique and delivered to Poincy in exchange for Du Parquet. Thoisy was taken to Saint Christophe, where he arrived on 24 January 1846. While passing Guadeloupe La Vernade embarked one of Poincy's nephews, Longvilliers, against the promise that Du Parquet would be released. The other nephew, Charles de Tréval, remained as a hostage. Thoisy was held prisoner in Saint Christopher, but due to expressions of sympathy for him by the population Poincy embarked him for France at night at the end of April, where he arrived on 17 May 1646.

At the start of 1647 Robert de Longvilliers held the title of governor for the king of Saint Martin and was commander of Saint Christophe in the absence of his uncle. He held an assembly at the Anse of Louvet in which he consented to the establishment of a number of Carmelite monks from the province of Touraine. They could celebrate services and administer the sacrament in Cabesterre (northwest region) and Anse à Louvet (extreme west). The Carmelites began to build a chapel and monastery at Anse-à-Louvet on 10 June 1649. With the agreement of Poincy and Longvilliers another establishment was built by the settlers at Anse-des-Ouignes for the monks from Touraine.

== Saint Martin (1648–51) ==
Saint-Martin Island

The Spanish under the Marquis of Cadereyta drove the French and Dutch settlers from Saint Martin in 1633. In June 1647 they evacuated the Spanish garrison. Early in 1648 they returned with some French and Dutch laborers to destroy the fort and other structures on the island. Five of the Dutch, four of the French and one mulatto escaped and hid until the Spanish had left. The Dutch made a makeshift raft on which they reached Sint Eustatius and told the governor Abraham Adriensen of what had happened. He sent a small group of Dutch settled to take possession on the island. The French got word to Poincy, who sent 30 men, but they were turned back by the Dutch.

Poincy then sent 300 men under Robert de Lonvilliers, governor of Saint Christophe, who landed without meeting resistance. The French and Dutch ratified a treaty on 22 March 1648 on a hill that became called the "Mont des Accords". The Treaty of Concordia was signed by the two governors of the island, Robert de Longvilliers for France and Martin Thomas for the States General of the Netherlands. The French would keep the area they occupied and the coast facing Anguilla, while the Dutch would have the area of the fort and the land around it on the south coast. The inhabitants would share the natural resources of the island.

Robert de Lonvilliers was governor of Saint Martin from 1648 to 1651. There had been no French governor on the island since 1633, when Pierre Belain d'Esnambuc left. He was replaced on Saint Martin in 1651 by his uncle, Philippe de Poincy.

== Saint Christophe (1651–66) ==
Robert de Lonvilliers married Renée Giraud, daughter of the first captain of Saint Christophe in Saint Christophe on 1 August 1649. They had three children, Philippe (born 1652), Constance and Catherine Marie.

After Poincy died in 1660 the Order, which had still not paid all the purchase money, appointed Charles de Sales the new governor. The Second Anglo-Dutch War formally began in March 1665. In January 1666, with a growing threat of war between France and England, Sales made a treaty with Governor William Watts of the English part of the island under which they agreed that when one party heard that war had been declared they would notify the other, and they would delay for three days before launching an attack. However, hostilities between the French and English on Saint Christopher broke out before the official declaration of war was received. Robert de Lonvilliers was killed at Pointe Sable on 1 April 1666 at the age of 55.

== Sources ==
- Besnard, Antonin (2014), Être missionnaire carme aux Antilles (1646-1699) : d'après la correspondance de la province de Touraine. Histoire (in French), Université de Rennes 2-Haute Bretagne
- Broglin, Étienne (December 2017), Les " Petits Messieurs " Pensionnaires De L'academie Royale De Juilly 1651 – 1828 (PDF) (in French), Centre Roland Mousnier, archived from the original (PDF) on 17 September 2018
- Cahoon, Ben, "Saint-Martin", Worldstatesmen.org
- Cahoon (b), Ben, "Saint Kitts and Nevis", Worldstatesmen.org
- Camus, Michel-Christian (1997), "Le général de Poincy, premier capitaliste sucrier des Antilles" (PDF), Revue française d'histoire d'outre-mer (in French), 84 (317): 119–125, doi:10.3406/outre.1997.3590
- Dator, James F. (2011), Search for a New Land: Imperial Power and Afro-Creole Resistance in the British Leeward Islands 1624-1745 (PDF) (Doctoral thesis), University of Michigan
- Dubé, Jean-Claude (28 April 2005), The Chevalier de Montmagny: First Governor of New France, University of Ottawa Press, ISBN 978-0-7766-1705-3
- Favre, Jean Hervé, "Robert de LONGVILLIERS de POINCY", Geneanet (in French)
- Grunberg, B.; Roux, B.; Grunberg, J. (2013), B. Grunberg (ed.), Missionnaires carmes et capucins : Pacifique de Provins et Maurile de St Michel (PDF) (in French), Paris: L'Harmattan
- Guët, Isidore (1893), Origines de la Martinique: Le Colonel Francois de Collart Et La Martinique de Son Temps; Colonisation, Sieges, Revoltes Et Combats de 1625 A1720 (in French), Vannes: Lafoyle
- Henocq, Christophe (15 March 2010), "Concordia Treaty, 23rd March 1648", Heritage, 6
- Konstam, Angus (20 December 2011), Warships of the Anglo-Dutch Wars 1652–74, Bloomsbury Publishing, ISBN 978-1-84908-411-6
- Les Ordres Militaires du Moyen Age (in French), OSMCS Commanderie des Chevaliers d'Artois
- Marley, David (1998), Wars of the Americas: A Chronology of Armed Conflict in the New World, 1492 to the Present, ABC-CLIO, ISBN 978-0-87436-837-6
- Martineau, Alfred; May, L.-Ph. (1935), Trois siècles d'histoire antillaise : Martinique et Guadeloupe de 1635 à nos jours (in French), Paris: Librairie Leroux
- Rossignol, Bernadette; Rossignol, Philippe (2017), "ROY de COURPON de LA VERNADE Lettres de noblesse et généalogie" (PDF), Généalogie et Histoire de la Caraïbe (in French)
- Southey, Captain Thomas (1827), Chronological History of the West Indies, London: Longman, Rees, Orme, Brown, & Green
- "St. Martin Sint Maarten: Histoire", Sea-Seek (in French)
