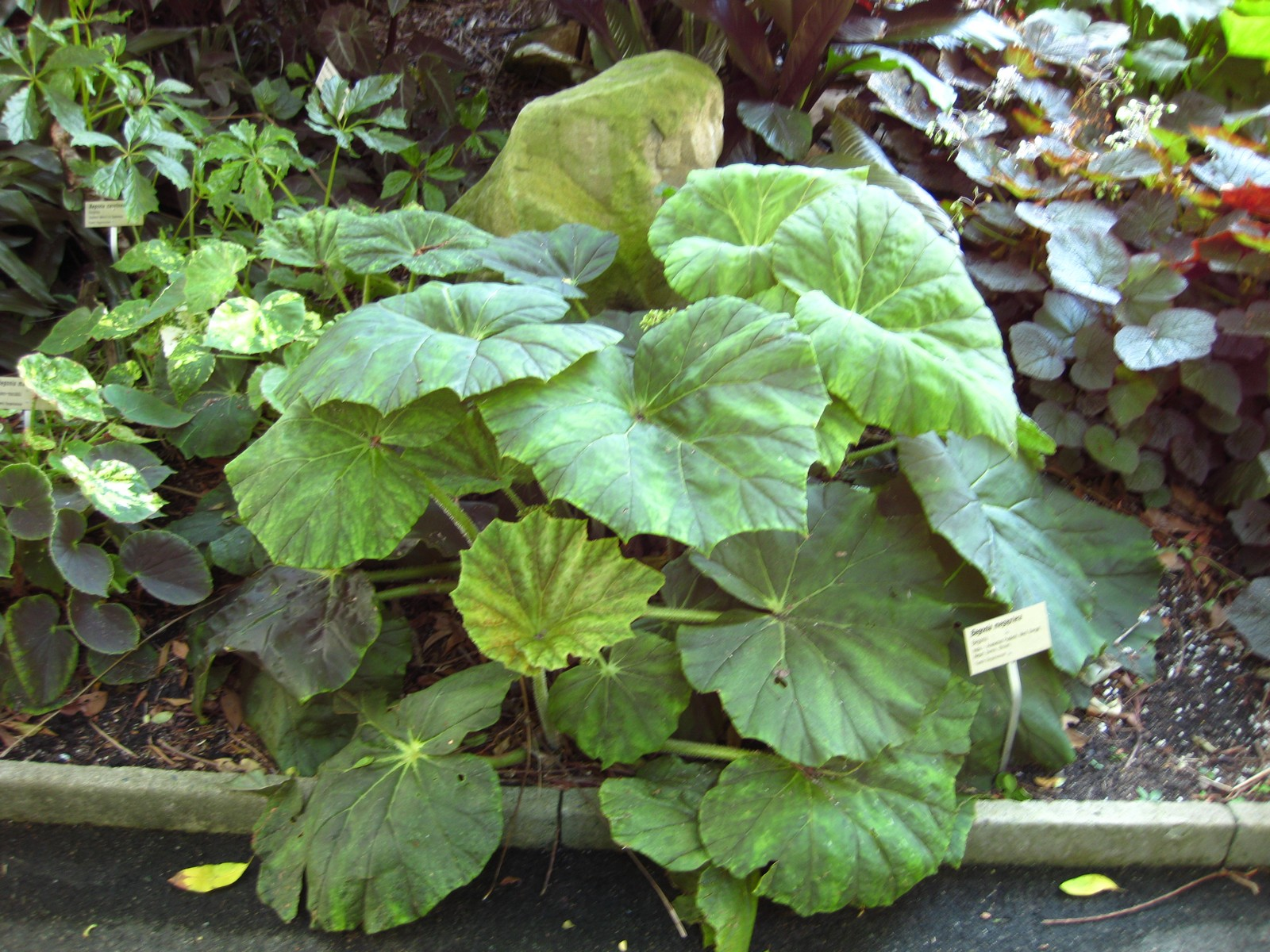
- At the Royal Botanic Garden, Sydney

Scientific classification
- Kingdom: Plantae
- Clade: Embryophytes
- Clade: Tracheophytes
- Clade: Angiosperms
- Clade: Eudicots
- Clade: Rosids
- Order: Cucurbitales
- Family: Begoniaceae
- Genus: Begonia
- Species: B. megaptera

Binomial name
- Begonia megaptera A.DC.

= Begonia megaptera =

Species of flowering plant

Begonia megaptera, otherwise known as the large winged begonia, is a species of flowering plant in the family Begoniaceae, native to Nepal, the eastern Himalayas, Assam, Bangladesh, and Myanmar. Very rare in its native habitat, it is cultivated as an ornamental and medicinal plant.

== Etymology ==
The genus name, Begonia, was coined by botanist Charlies Plumier in honor of Michel Bégon, while megaptera refers to the plants large winglike leaves. "Mega" originates from the Ancient Greek word μέγας (mégas), meaning "great" or "large," whilst "ptera" is derived from the Ancient Greek word "pteron," meaning "wing" or "feather".
