= Pierre du Halde =

French soldier

Governor of Saint Christophe
- In office December 1636 – 1638
- Preceded by: Pierre Belain d'Esnambuc
- Succeeded by: René de Béthoulat de la Grange-Fromenteau

Personal details
- Occupation: Soldier, colonist

Pierre du Halde was a French soldier who was the second governor of the French colony on Saint Christopher Island between 1636 and 1638.

== Background ==
Du Halde was a gentleman of Gascony. He was a brave soldier who had lost an arm in the service of the king. He was called "Bras de fer" (iron arm) after the artificial limb that he wore to replace the lost arm. Pierre du Halde was sergeant-major of the garrison of Brouage. He was named the king's lieutenant in the islands on 7 March 1635.

== Governor of Saint Christophe ==
Islands in the Lesser Antilles

Pierre Belain d'Esnambuc, the first Captain General and Governor of Saint Christophe, died in Saint Christophe in December 1636. He left all his property, including his rights to Martinique, to his nephew Jacques Dyel du Parquet. Du Halde took over as interim governor in Saint Christophe. He maintained the arrangements that Enambuc had made for the militia, police and commerce. Du Halde sailed to Martinique on the Saint-Jacques to inform the younger du Parquet brother of the death of his uncle. The two du Parquet brothers decided to return to France, where the company confirmed the younger brother as governor of Martinique, and he returned to that island on 2 December 1837.

The Compagnie des Îles de l'Amérique heard good reports of du Halde and sent him a commission as captain general to command in Saint Christophe, the same as the commissions they had sent to Charles Liénard de L'Olive in Guadeloupe and du Parquet in Martinique. He received the commission in March 1637. Du Halde appears to have been a poor choice and strongly wanted to return to France. Whether he was tired of the islands, or whether he needed to leave due to his infirmities, he made strong representations to the king and the company to be recalled. The lords of the company, concerned that there would be unrest on the island in his absence, refused him permission to return until they had obtained another governor. They also obtained a decree from the king on 9 September 1637 that expressly forbade him from leaving without the king's permission.

== Replacement ==
Du Halde retained command while waiting for the sieur de La Grange Fromenteau, who had been chosen as lieutenant general and was preparing to cross with his wife and family. De Lagrange Fromenteau had asked the company for the job of governor, which was granted, but did not have enough money to cover his travelling expenses. He made an offer to Phillippe de Longvilliers de Poincy to act as his lieutenant if Poincy would cover the costs, and Poincy agreed. Du Halde could now return to France. He was replaced in Saint Christophe in 1638 by René de Béthoulat, seigneur de la Grange-Fromenteau.

Cardinal Richelieu had begun to take great interest in the islands, wanted to place them under a general whose birth, courage and views would be agreeable to the cardinal. He selected Phillippe de Longvilliers de Poincy, whom King Louis XIII appointed as governor and lieutenant general of the American islands. Poincy was named governor general of the American islands and mainland (Gouverneur général des Isles et Terre Ferme de l'Amérique) on 25 February 1638. Poincy left Dieppe on 15 January 1639, arrived at Martinique a month later, then visited Guadeloupe and Saint Christophe. He was received in Martinique on 11 February 1639 and in Saint Christophe on 14 February 1639.

== Sources ==
- Anonyme de Saint-Christophe (1640), "Relation des îles de Sainct Christofle, Gardelouppe et la Martinicque" (PDF), Corpus Antillais (in French), vol. 4
- Banbuck, C.A. (1935), Histoire politique, économique et sociale de la Martinique sous l'Ancien Régime (in French), Paris: Marcel Revière
- Cahoon, Ben, "Saint Kitts and Nevis", Worldstatesmen.org
- Dessalles, Adrien; Dessalles, Pierre Régis (1847), Histoire générale des Antilles ... (in French), Libraire-éditeur
- Saint-Méry, Médéric Louis Élie Moreau de (1784), Loix et constitutions des colonies françoises de l'Amerique sous le vent... (in French), L'Auteur
- Tertre, Jean-Baptiste Du (1667), Histoire generale des Antilles habitées par les François (in French), Chez Thomas Iolly
- Voyages et etablissemens aux Antilles (in French), vol. 23, van Harrevelt, 1777
