= Hospitaller colonization of the Americas =

Colonization efforts of the Order of Saint John in the Americas

The Hospitaller colonization of the Americas occurred during a 14-year period in the 17th century in which the Knights Hospitaller of Malta, at the time a vassal state of the Kingdom of Sicily, commanded by the Italian Grand Master Giovanni Paolo Lascaris, possessed four Caribbean islands: Saint Christopher, Saint Martin, Saint Barthélemy, and Saint Croix.

The Knights' presence in the Caribbean Sea region grew out of their order's close relationship with the French nobility and the presence of many members in the Americas as French administrators. The main person involved with their brief foray into colonization was Phillippe de Longvilliers de Poincy, who was both a Knight of Malta and governor of the French colonies in the Caribbean. Poincy convinced the Knights to purchase the islands from the bankrupt Company of the American Islands in 1651 and stayed to govern them until his death in 1660. During this time, the Order acted as proprietor of the islands, while King Louis XIV continued to possess nominal sovereignty; however, Poincy ruled largely independent of them both. In 1665, the Hospitallers sold their rights in the islands to the new French West India Company, bringing their colonial project to an end.

== Background ==
From the beginning of the French colonization of the Americas, members of the Knights of Malta, fief of the Sicilian Crown, had been prominent in New France and the French Antilles. By then, most of the order was composed of French aristocrats, and many French naval officers had trained with the Hospitaller navy. Many Knights had high-ranking positions in the early French colonial administration, including Aymar Chaste and Isaac de Razilly in Acadia, and Charles de Montmagny in Quebec. In 1635, Razilly suggested to the Grand Master of the order, Fra' Antoine de Paule, that the Hospitallers establish a priory in Acadia, but de Paule rejected the idea.

The next Grand Master, Giovanni Paolo Lascaris, was more interested in colonial affairs. In 1642 or 1643, he was named godfather to an Abenaki convert in New France. Montmagny represented Lascaris at the baptism.

Phillippe de Longvilliers de Poincy, founder of the Hospitaller colonies, began his career in a manner similar to these other administrators. Longvilliers fought the Turks in the Mediterranean and participated with the Sieges of the Isle of Ré and La Rochelle in 1627. In between, he served as a subordinate of Razilly in Acadia, commanding a fort.

== History ==
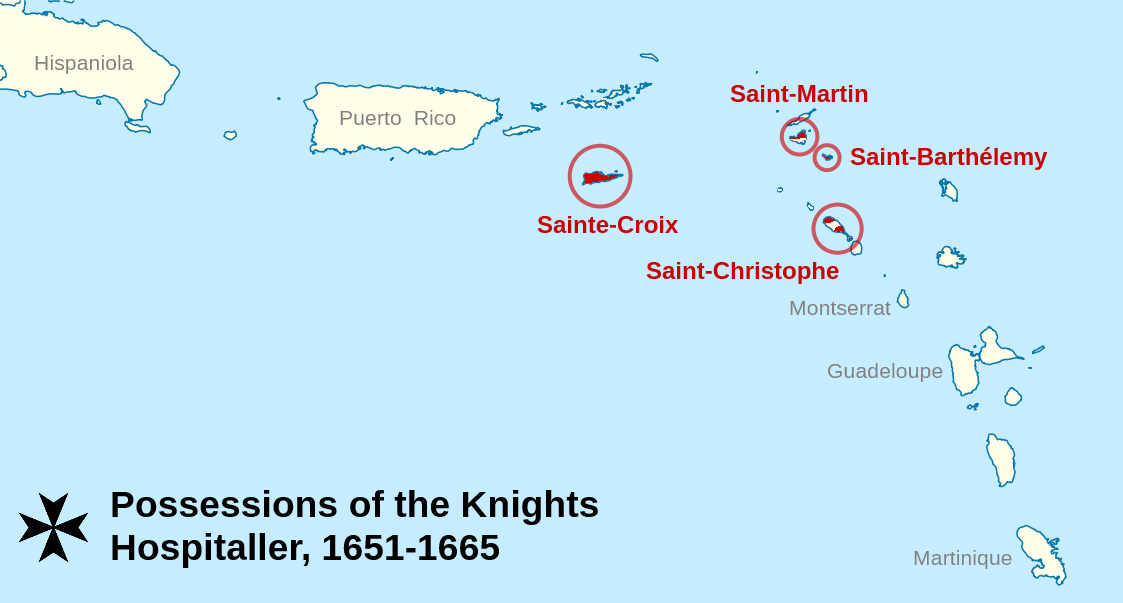
Map of the order's territories in the Caribbean.

Poincy first went to Saint Christopher in 1639 as the appointed governor for the Company of the American Islands. King Louis XIII soon after made Poincy his Lieutenant-General for the entire Caribbean. Poincy began to invest heavily in building projects on the island. He extended French rule to other islands, establishing the first European settlement on Saint-Barthélemy in 1648, and founding a settlement on St. Croix in 1650–51. He sent an additional 300 men to reinforce and take over the small French settlement on Saint-Martin. There he negotiated the Treaty of Concordia, determining the boundary between the French and Dutch settlements that still remains at present.

Poincy also established himself as the absolute ruler of the islands, resisting the authority of the failing French company. He became involved with conflict with the Capuchin missionaries, who disapproved of the governor's consorting with local English, Dutch, and Huguenot Protestants, and of his refusal to liberate the children of baptized slaves. Poincy also provoked resentment at his harsh treatment of subjects who resisted him. In addition he drew disfavor from the Order of Malta when he used income from the Order's commandry estates in Europe to pay for his grand style of living on the island. The company's directors decided to replace Poincy. They commissioned Noëlle Patrocles de Thoisy, a gentleman from Burgundy, to replace him, obtaining an order from the king summoning the governor back to France. Poincy refused to comply. His militia drove Thoisy off the island, and ultimately Thoisy was captured and sent back to France in chains.

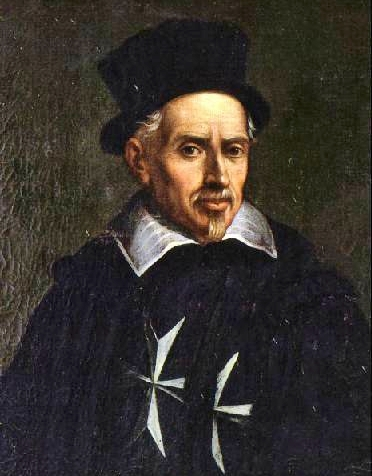
Grand Master Giovanni Paolo Lascaris.

Seeking to keep his position, Poincy in 1649 suggested that the Order of Malta buy the islands. By this time the Company was languishing. Poincy himself, by defying its authority, had shown its ineffectiveness. At the same time, Cardinal Mazarin, France's chief minister, was busy with the Peace of Westphalia and could not devote his attention to colonization. In 1651 the company was dissolved; its exploitation rights were sold to various parties. Martinique, Guadeloupe, and several other islands were sold to private individuals.

The Hospitallers, with the approval of the Grand Master Lascaris, bought Saint-Christophe, along with Poincy's newly established dependencies of Saint Croix, Saint Barthélemy, and Saint Martin. The Knights' ambassador to the French court, Jacques de Souvré, signed the agreement. The Order's proprietary rights were confirmed in a treaty with France two years later: while the king would remain sovereign, the Knights would have complete temporal and spiritual jurisdiction on their islands. The only limits to their rule were that they could send only French knights to govern the islands, and upon the accession of each new King of France they were to provide a gold crown worth 1,000 écus.

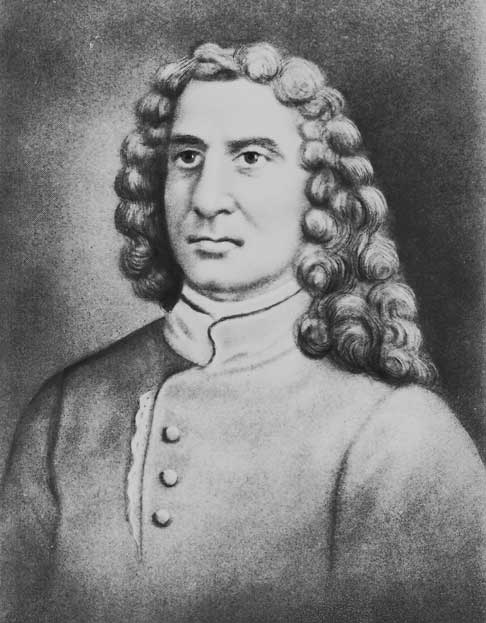
Charles Jacques Huault de Montmagny

The council of the Grand Master decided that Poincy could continue to serve as governor, but they also made the former governor of New France, Charles de Montmagny, the "proconsul general", sending him to represent their interests on Saint Christopher. Montmagny hoped to help Poincy get the colonies' finances in order. However, Poincy again resisted any outside interference; once Montmagny had returned to France, Poincy sent away the man left in his place. The Order sent Montmagny for a second time in 1653, as "lieutenant governor". He took formal possession of the islands in the name of the Grand Master. However, Poincy still refused to share power, and Montmagny was quickly sidelined, biding his time on a farm on Saint Christopher and hoping to take over after Poincy's death. Montmagny ultimately died first, in 1657.

Poincy continued to develop the colonies. He built strong and impressive fortifications on Saint Christopher along with churches, roads, a hospital, and his own grand residence, the Château de la Montagne. Outside the capital, Hospitaller rule was more precarious. The settlement on Saint Barthélemy suffered an attack by Carib people, and those who were not killed abandoned the island. Poincy sent a group of 30 men to replace them, which grew to 100 by 1664. In 1657 a rebellion overthrew the Hospitaller regime on St. Croix. Poincy sent a new governor to restore order, build fortifications and a monastery, and begin to clear much of the island's forests for plantation agriculture.

To replace Montmagny, the Order sent two new lieutenant governors. The more prominent of the two was Charles de Sales, a relative of St. Francis de Sales who proved popular with the inhabitants of the island. Shortly before his death in 1660, Poincy signed a treaty of peace with the English and the Carib people of Saint Christopher, but the peace did not last. De Sales succeeded Poincy as governor. In 1666, after the Knights had formally ended their control of the islands, fighting began between the French and the English on the island. In a battle at Cayonne, de Sales was killed, but the French retained their settlements.

By the early 1660s, frustration was growing that the colonies were not turning a profit. The Order still owed money to France for the initial purchase of the islands, and on Malta the knights debated whether they should sell them back. Jean-Baptiste Colbert, much more interested in colonization than Mazarin, was now in power in King Louis XIV's court, and he applied pressure to the Knights to sell. In 1665, the Knights sold their colony to the newly formed Compagnie des Indes occidentales.

=== Hospitaller governors on Saint Christopher ===
- Phillippe de Longvilliers de Poincy, 1651–1660 – Governor under the Company of the American Islands from 1639
- Charles de Sales, 1660–1666
- Claude de Roux de Saint-Laurent (1666–1689)

== Legacy ==
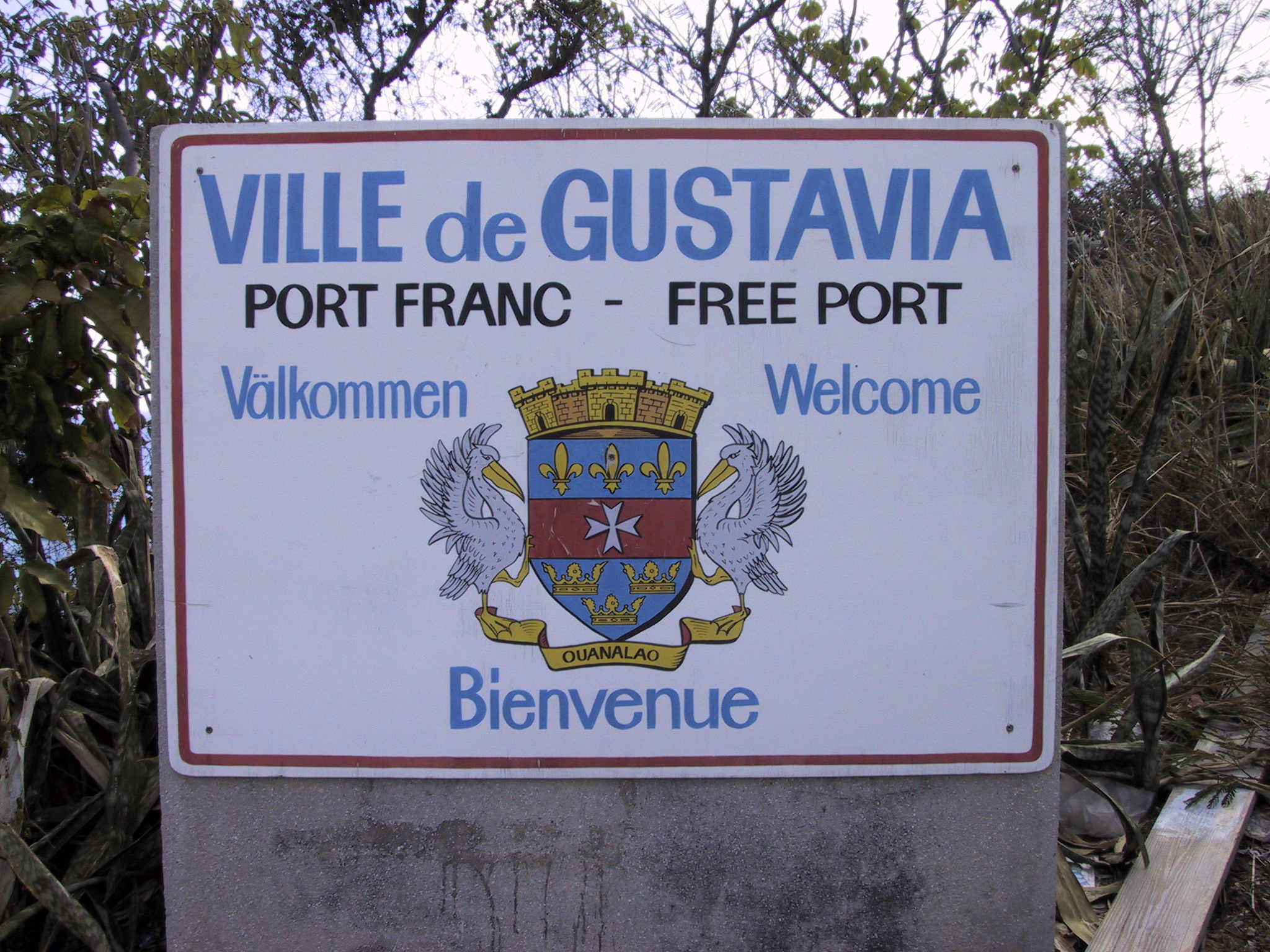
The coat of arms of Saint Barthélemy.

The Knights of Malta never established another colony. However, members of the order remained active in France's navy and overseas empire. Several were involved in the Mississippi Company scheme early in the eighteenth century. Later in the century, Étienne-François Turgot, a Hospitaller and colonial administrator, tried unsuccessfully to settle Maltese people in Guiana.

The short period of Hospitaller occupation is still remembered on the different islands. Poincy's rule on St. Kitts is remembered for the spectacle of his large, grand household, the servants all dressed in the emblem of the Knights. On St. Croix one can find frequent reference to the "seven flags" in the island's history, counting the Knights of Malta together with the United States and five European nations that have ruled it. St. Barthélemy has in its coat of arms a Maltese cross on a red fess, representing the period of Hospitaller colonization.

== See also ==
- Italy and the colonization of the Americas

== Bibliography ==
- Boucher, Philip P. (2008). France and the American Tropics to 1700: Tropics of discontent?. Johns Hopkins University Press.
