= René de Béthoulat de La Grange-Fromenteau =

René de Béthoulat, de La Grange-Fromenteau

Lieutenant general of Saint Christophe
- In office 6 January 1638 – 12 January 1639
- Preceded by: Pierre du Halde
- Succeeded by: Phillippe de Longvilliers de Poincy

Personal details
- Born: c. 1585
- Died: before 1660
- Occupation: Army officer

René de Béthoulat, seigneur de La Grange-Fromenteau (or Bétoulat, Lagrange, Fourmenteau; c. 1585 – before 1660) was deputy governor of the French colony of Saint-Christophe, on Saint Christopher Island, from 1638 to 1639. When the governor arrived the two men began quarreling, La Grange was imprisoned on a charge of high treason, and later was shipped back to France.

== Family ==
René de Bethoulat écuyer, seigneur de La Grange-Fromenteau, was from a noble family of Champagne. He was appointed page of François de Bourbon, Duke of Montpensier (1542–1592), then squire of Henri, Prince of Condé (1588–1646), in 1611. He was made governor of the Château d'Amboise in 1614, and governor of the town of Déols in 1616. On 26 February 1620 he married Marie Jumeau, daughter of Denis Jumeau, artillery engineer. Their children were Charles de Bétoulat, seigneur de la Petitiere, André de Bétoulat, Comte de la Vauguoin, and Françoise de Bétoulat, who married Gabriel Imbert, seigneur de Petitval, cavalry captain. La Grange made a second marriage with Françoise Boyer.

== Appointment ==
La Grange was aide de camp in the king's army in 1638. The governor of Saint Christophe, Pierre Belain d'Esnambuc, had died in 1636. Pierre du Halde had reluctantly taken over as acting governor. The Compagnie des Îles de l'Amérique agreed to make La Grange governor of Saint Christophe, but he found he did not have enough money to cover his travelling expenses. He met with Phillippe de Longvilliers de Poincy in Brest and offered to act as lieutenant to Poincy, who would be governor, if Poincy would cover his costs. The Company accepted the arrangement and on 6 January 1638 made Poincy captain general of Saint Christophe and La Grange lieutenant general. Poincy was also appointed the king's governor and lieutenant general of all the Islands of America for a three year period.

== Saint-Christophe ==
Poincy lent La Grange 4,500 livres to fit himself out. La Grange left La Rochelle in April 1638 and arrived in Saint Christophe in June 1638 with his wife and family. He was to make preparations for Poincy's arrival. Du Halde could now return to France. While acting as governor La Grange gave his protection to the Capuchin friars, who prospered in Saint Christophe. La Grange planted and cultivated grape vines, from which he collected grapes at the end of six months. Two crops a year were normal, but wine production was not practical because the birds would eat the fruit.

Poincy sailed from France on 11 January 1639 on Le Petite Europe and arrived in Martinique on 11 February 1639, where the governor Jacques Dyel du Parquet promised his obedience. He landed in Guadeloupe on 17 February 1639, where he met the governor Charles Liénard de L'Olive, then went on the Saint Christophe. There he found that La Grange had not prepared a house for him, but had only looked after himself. La Grange further antagonized him by sending him 18 African slaves as his share of the prize from a Dutch ship, while keeping 78 for himself. Relations quickly deteriorated between Poincy and La Grange, who thought himself the real leader of Saint Christophe, and La Grange's wife made matters worse. She insinuated that despite Poincy's vow of celibacy as a Knight of Malta he had a seraglio. According to Captain Thomas Southey (1827),

De Poincy having taken a beautiful girl called Bellette (Note: Bellette: Southey has the name wrong. She was the daughter of the sieur Belletête.) from her father's house, upon the pretence that he was a debauchee and a drunkard, and afterwards making frequent visits to her, had occasioned several satirical things to be written upon him: one, in particular, called "La Nymphe Christophorine Prosopopee," written by a relation of Madame la Grange, so galled De Poincy, who blamed her for some other squib, that he seized all their moveables for the money he had advanced La Grange in France, and also twenty-two Negroes, which he claimed as his, and ordered Madame la Grange to be kept prisoner in her own house. M. de La Grange offered to pay M. de Poincy, and to send his wife to France in the first vessel; but De Poincy refused.

On 16 October 1639 Poincy had La Grange and his wife tried and found guilty of high treason. Their slaves were all confiscated and they were taken to Basseterre. They could easily have escaped but feared that if they did they might be ambushed and killed. The island's council appealed to the king and the Company, and after eleven months in prison La Grange and his family were released. Poincy soon found an excuse to ship them back to France.

== Aftermath ==
La Grange Fromenteau returned to France at the start of 1641. He began a lawsuit which was still not resolved after both La Grange and Poincy had died. In 1664 his children André and Françoise asserted their rights and claims on the island of Saint Christophe against the Order of Malta, which they had previously asserted against Poincy.

== Sources ==
- Béthoulat, André de, seigneur de la Grange-Fourmenteau ... (in French), iREL: Archives nationales d'outre-mer, 1664
- Cahoon, Ben, "Saint Kitts and Nevis", Worldstatesmen.org
- Dessalles, Adrien; Dessalles, Pierre Régis (1847), Histoire générale des Antilles ... (in French), Libraire-éditeur
- Grunberg, Bernard; Roux, Benoît; Grunberg, Josiane (2013), "Voyageurs anonymes aux Antilles" (PDF), Corpus Antillais (in French), 4, Paris: L'Harmattan
- Rossignol, Bernadette; Rossignol, Philippe (29 September 2001), L'ordre de Malte dans la Caraïbe (PDF) (in French), Fréjus: Centre d'Histoire & d'Études des Troupes d'Outre-Mer
- Saint-Méry, Médéric Louis Élie Moreau de (1784), Loix et constitutions des colonies françoises de l'Amerique sous le vent... (in French), L'Auteur
- Southey, Captain Thomas (1827), Chronological History of the West Indies, London: Longman, Rees, Orme, Brown, & Green
- Thaumassière, Gaspard Thaumas de La (1689), Histoire de Berry (in French), Morel
- Voyages et etablissemens aux Antilles (in French), vol. 23, van Harrevelt, 1777
