= Lake Bermen =

Body of water in Quebec province, Canada

- Lac Allemand
- Lac Bermen (French)
- Location in Quebec
- Location: Caniapiscau, Côte-Nord, Quebec
- Coordinates: 53.59278°N 68.89777°W
- Basin countries: Canada
- Max. length: 36 kilometres (22 mi)
- Max. width: 6 kilometres (3.7 mi)
- Surface area: 103 square kilometres (40 sq mi)

Lake Bermen (French: Lac Bermen, formerly known as Lac Allemand) is a 103 square kilometres (40 sq mi) lake in the province of Quebec, Canada. The lake is on ancient rocks of the Superior Province where gold mineralization has been found. It is named after Claude de Bermen de la Martinière (1636–1719), a senior official in New France.

== Location ==
The Lake Bermen region (NTS 23F) is in the centre of the province of Quebec near the border with Labrador. It is northwest of the town of Fermont and south of the Caniapiscau Reservoir. The region is accessible by float plane from Fermont or by helicopter from Wabush airport in Labrador. There are less than two inhabitants per 1 square kilometre (0.39 sq mi). Lake Bermen is in the unorganized territory of Caniapiscau in the Côte-Nord region of Quebec.

== Hydrography ==
Lake Bermen is 36 kilometres (22 mi) long and 6 kilometres (3.7 mi) wide, and has an area of 103 square kilometres (40 sq mi). It is in a swampy area about 50 kilometres (31 mi) southeast of Caniapiscau Reservoir. The lake is fed by several bodies of water further south, and drains to the north via lakes Rossignol and Guillemot to the Caniapiscau River.

== Climate ==
The lake is in the subarctic climate zone. Average annual precipitation is 813 millimetres (32.0 in), of which 522 millimetres (20.6 in) falls in the spring and summer. Mean annual temperature is −3.7 °C (25.3 °F), and ranges from −20.6 °C (−5.1 °F) in winter to 11.8 °C (53.2 °F) in summer. There are on average 94 days without freezing each year, between June 10 and September 14.

== Geology ==
The Lake Bermen area contains Archean rocks of the southeastern end of the Superior Province. The region contains metamorphic rocks of granulite facies and plutonic rocks, mostly belonging to the south and north domains of the Ashuanipi Complex, with some belonging to the Caniapiscau Domain. The north and south Ashuanipi are separated by east-west oriented faults.

The Ashuanipi complex consists of gneiss rocks (ca 2.71 Ga) with early intrusions (ca 2.69 Ga) of tonalite and gabbro. The rocks were deformed and metamorphosed before emplacement of syntectonic diatexites (ca 2.66-2.68 Ga). The diatexites could be the product of fusion of the paragneisses of the Opinaca Subprovince and some of the tonalities and mafic gneisses of the La Grande Subprovince. Later intrusions of felsic granitoids (ca 2.63-2.64 Ga) cut the diatexites and their surrounding gneisses.

The region has promise as a source of minerals, and several gold mineralizations have been found. The most interesting mineralizations are associated with interbedded iron formations with metavolcanic and metasedimentary units.

== Name ==
Lake Bermen was renamed in 1945 after Claude de Bermen de la Martinière (1636–1719), a noble from Perche, France and a relative of Louis de Rouvroy, duc de Saint-Simon (1675–1755). Bermen came to Quebec City in 1662, and served as a seigneurial judge in Beauport and on Île d'Orléans. In 1678 he became a member of the Sovereign Council of New France. He owned the seigneury of Lauzon for several years, and in 1692 acquired the neighboring seigneury of La Martinière. Bermen became Keeper of the Seals of the council in 1700, and Lieutenant General of the Prévôté of Québec in 1703. In 1710, despite opposition from the intendant Jacques Raudot, he became the first member of the Conseil Supérieur. In 1714 the intendant Michel Bégon de la Picardière delegated his powers to him.

== Sources ==
- Lac Bermen (in French), Commisson de toponymie, Gouvernement du Québec, 2012
- "Lacs de la Côte-Nord: Lac Bermen", GrandQuebec.com
- Leclair, Alain; Lamothe, Daniel; Choinière, Jean; Martin, Parent (1998), Géologie de la région du lac Bermen (23F) (PDF) (in French), Canada/Quebec
- NASA Earth Observations: Population Density, NASA/SEDAC, archived from the original on 2016-02-09
- Peel, M C; Finlayson, B L; McMahon, T A (2007), "Updated world map of the Köppen-Geiger climate classification", Hydrology and Earth System Sciences, 11, doi:10.5194/hess-11-1633-2007
- "Région : Lac Bermen", atlasclimatique.ca (Rapport de l'atlas climatique) (in French)
- Simard, Martin (March 2008), Lexique stratigraphique des unités archéennes du nord-est de la Province du Supérieur (in French), Direction générale de Géologie Québec
