= Michel Bégon de la Picardière =

French colonial governor (1667–1747)

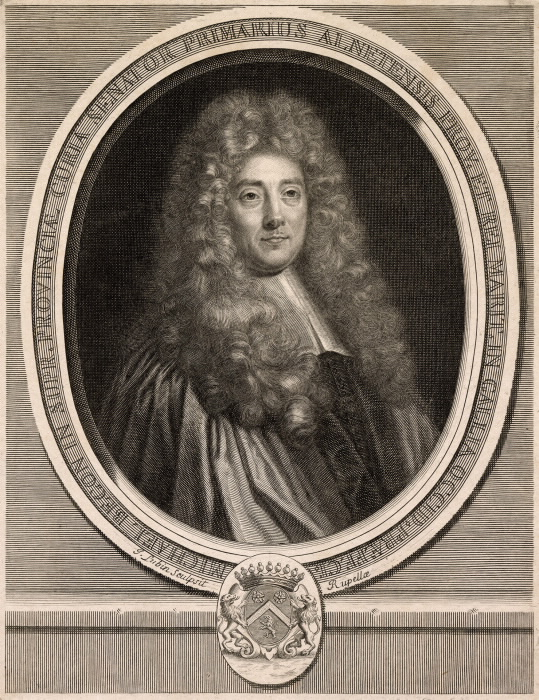
- Born: 21 March 1667
- Died: 18 January 1747

Michel Bégon de la Picardière (French pronunciation: [miʃɛl beɡɔ̃ də la pikaʁdjɛʁ]; 21 March 1667 – 18 January 1747) was an early administrator in charge of the French colony of New France, in what is now the province of Quebec, Canada.

== Early life ==
Bégons was born into a French family with a history of service to the King of France in fiscal and judicial matters. His father, Michel V Bégon, was intendant of the port of Rochefort from 1688 to 1710.

== Career ==
Bégon was appointed to serve as the intendant of New France in 1710. However, he, his new wife Jeanne-Élisabeth de Beauharnois de La Boische, and his brother Claude-Michel sailed for the colony in 1712. He replaced the co-intendants, Antoine-Denis Raudot and Jacques Raudot and held the position from 1712–1726. During his tenure he conducted a laissez-faire approach to governing the settlement's entrepreneurs. There are indications that he carried out questionable dealings in wheat and other agricultural products during his early years, using his position and the card money system to enrich himself. Many of his letters and reports to the government of France have been preserved; they show him to have been an avid naturalist, and included plans and suggestions for making the colony more self-sufficient. One of these suggestions was the introduction of slavery.

The last three years of his service as intendant were unexpected, as one successor died at sea before the new intendent, Claude-Thomas Dupuy, arrived. Upon the arrival of his replacement, Bégon left almost immediately for France where he continued his career.

== See also ==
- Claude de Bermen de la Martinière
