= Ars Mathematica =

Ars Mathematica may refer to:

- Ars Mathematica (organization) - a Paris-based arts non-profit
- Ars Mathematica Contemporanea - a research journal
