= Jean du Plessis d'Ossonville =

Jean du Plessis, sieur d’Ossonville

Governor of Guadeloupe
- In office 28 June 1635 – 4 December 1635
- Preceded by: none
- Succeeded by: Charles Liènard de l'Olive

Personal details
- Died: 4 December 1635 Guadeloupe
- Occupation: Soldier

Jean du Plessis, sieur d’Ossonville (died 4 December 1635) was a joint leader of the French expedition that established a colony on the island of Guadeloupe in 1635. He died on the island after less than six months.

== Background ==
Jean du Plessis was a gentleman from Picardy. He was the seigneur d’Ossonville, an advocate in Dieppe and a distant relative of Cardinal Richelieu (Armand Jean du Plessis).

Islands in the Lesser Antilles

The French adventurers Pierre Belain d'Esnambuc and Urbain Du Roissey reached Saint Christopher Island (Saint Kitts) in 1625, and were struck by the potential of the island as a colony once the indigenous Island Caribs were removed. They returned to France and in 1626 with the support of Cardinal Richelieu founded the "Association des Seigneurs de la Compagnie des Isles de l’Amérique". The private venture had the mandate to settle Saint Christophe, Barbados and other neighboring islands at the entrance to Peru that were not possessed by any king or Christian prince. They engaged over 500 men to work on the islands for three years, sailed in three ships in February 1627, and after a difficult crossing landed in Saint-Christophe almost three months later.

The first French settlers suffered from famine and fought with the Caribs and the English, who also had a settlement on the island. Richelieu sent a squadron of six ships commanded by Admiral François de Rotondy, seigneur de Cussac (or Cahuzac) to assist the settlers. Jean du Plessis travelled with this fleet. The fleet arrived at Saint-Christophe at the end of August 1629, defeated the English, reestablished d'Esnambuc and the French settlers in their settlements, and left for France. However, in November 1629 the Spanish admiral Federico de Toledo chased the French from the island. They left on two ships and attempted colonization of Antigua and Montserrat. They returned to Saint-Christophe in 1630.

In 1634 d'Esnambuc and his lieutenant Charles Liènard de l'Olive decided to colonize other islands, and sent an exploratory expedition to Martinique, Dominica and Guadeloupe under Guillaume d'Orange, who reported that Guadeloupe seemed the easiest to settle. Spanish attempts to colonize the Guadeloupe archipelago in the first half of the 16th century had failed, and since then European sailors had only used it as a resting place.

== Guadeloupe expedition ==
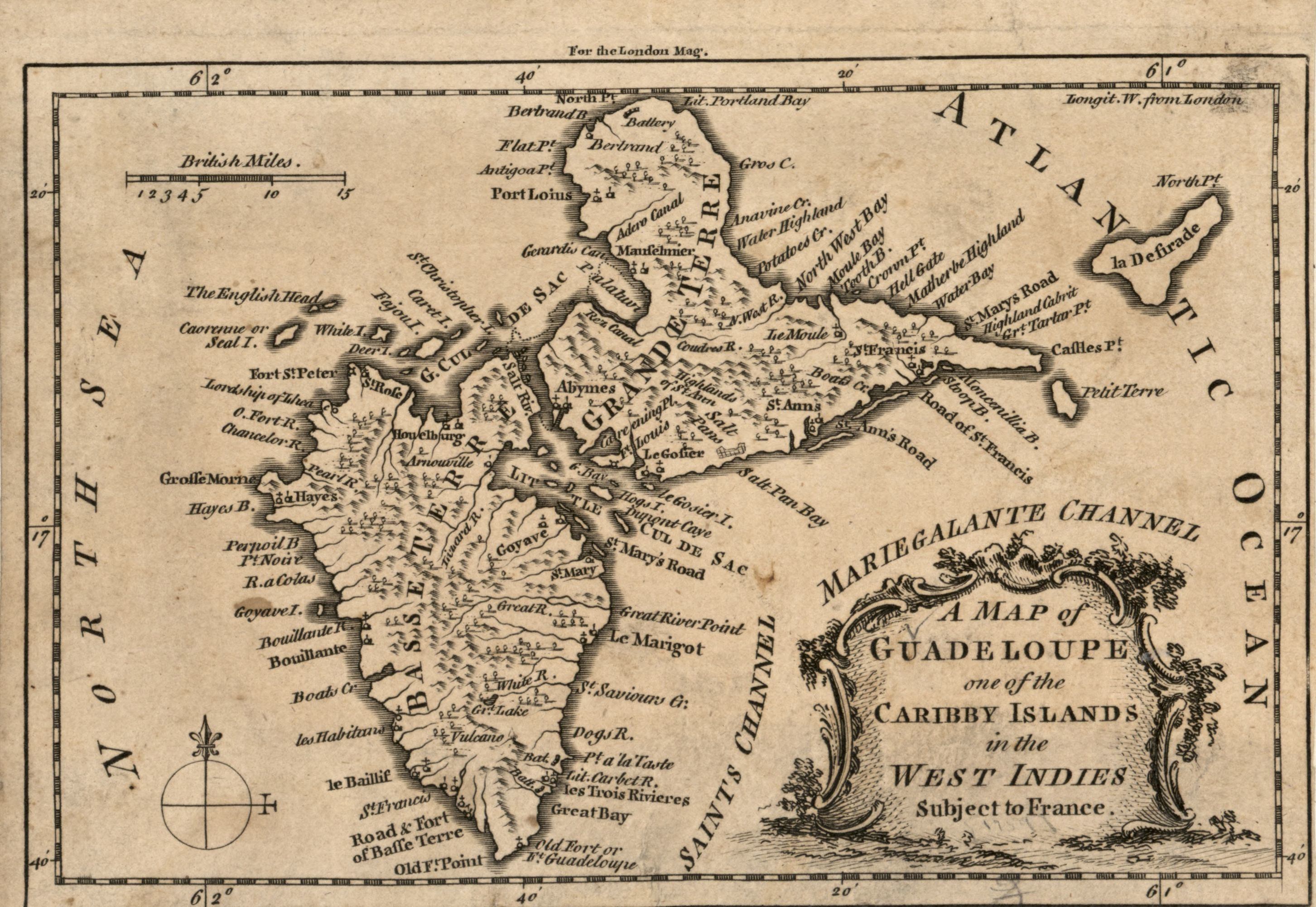
1759 map. Fort St. Peter (Saint-Pierre) is shown on the northern point of Basse-Terre Island, and Old Fort on the south point.

L'Olive left for Paris in 1634 to obtain permission from the Compagnie des îsles d'Amérique to settle Guadeloupe. He met Jean Du Plessis, sieur d'Ossonville in Dieppe, who agreed to join his project. The relationship between Du Plessis and Cardinal Richelieu may have been a factor. The two men went on to Paris to negotiate with the Company. They signed a treaty with the company in February 1635 in which they engaged to take 200 men to settle Dominica, Martinique or Guadeloupe.

Under the contract the Company would provide arms, ammunition and the protection of the government. L'Olive and Du Plessis would have settled at least 800 men after ten years, not counting women and children. They would pay a petun (tobacco) fee, and at the end of the contract the settlements, forts and dwellings would all become property of the company. The contract, signed on 14 February 1635, commissioned l'Olive and Du Plessis to "command together on the island they would inhabit." The two founders could not pay all the expenses, so brought in the merchants of Dieppe in exchange for a share of the profits over six years. The merchants had to supply them with 2,500 men.

The settlers left Dieppe on 25 May 1635 with 554 people, including four Dominican missionaries. There were 40 Norman families of peasant origin, 30 prostitutes from the port of Dieppe or Paris, and 400 hired laborers. Those who paid for their voyage would be given concessions to grow tobacco or sugar in the island, which they would work using slaves from Africa and hired hands from France. The alloués (allocated people) could not pay for their trip, but were on contract to work for three years. The people hired to cultivate the islands were nicknamed trente-six mois (36 months) after the term they were forced to serve. They would be treated, beaten and sold as slaves. However, some of them would later obtain concessions.

Jean François du Buc, who would be Governor of Grenada from 1658 to 1660, was a leading member of the expedition, as was Constant d'Aubigné, father of Françoise d'Aubigné, Marquise de Maintenon. The expedition sailed in two ships. One, with 400 men, carried l’Olive, Duplessis and two of the Dominicans, and the other carried 150 men and the other two Dominicans. They reached Martinique on 25 June 1635, which they claimed for the king, then moved on because they found the island "cut by precipices and gullies and infested with poisonous snakes".

== Settlement of Guadeloupe ==
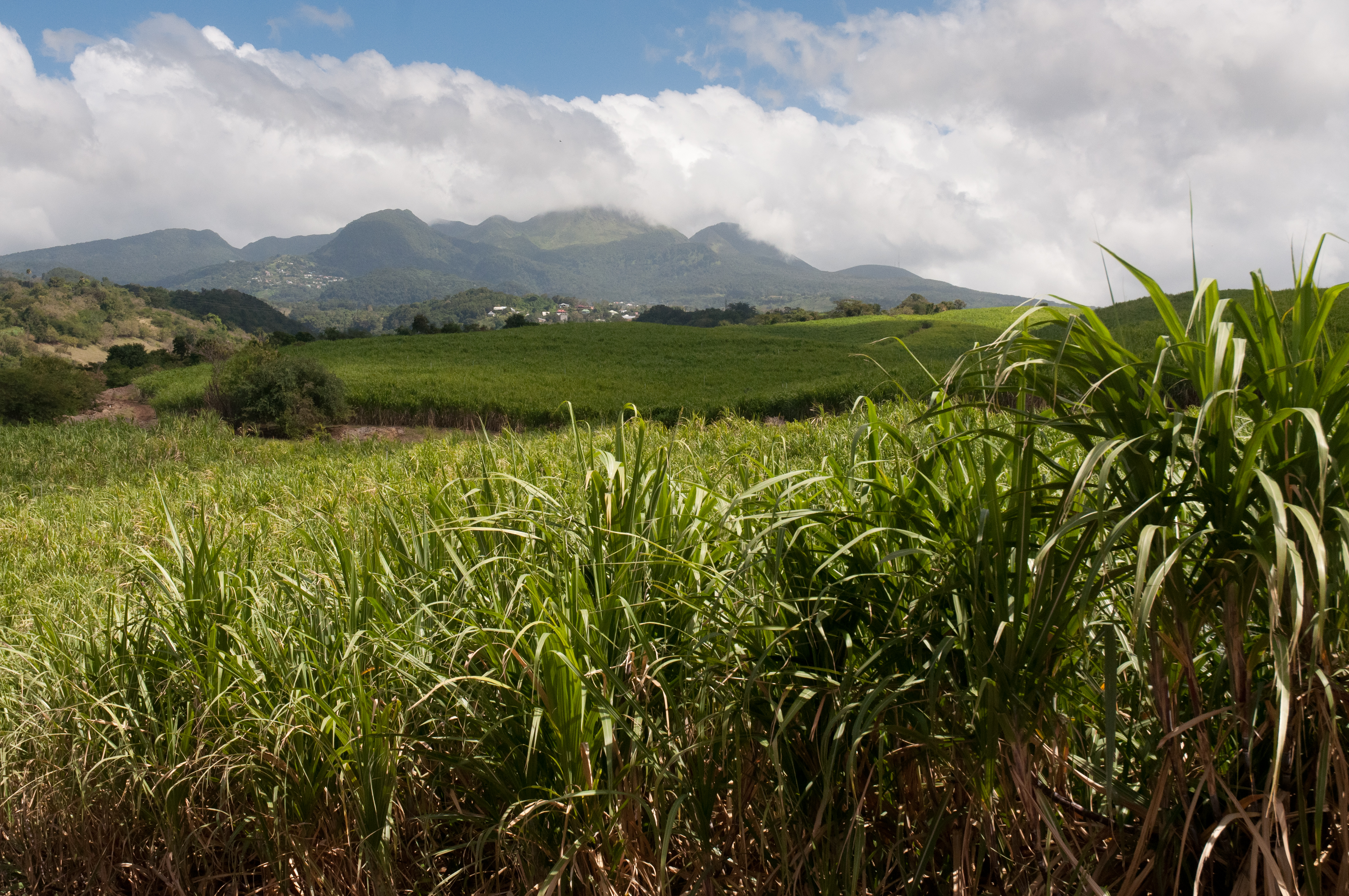
Sugar cane plantation on Guadeloupe

The ships made a very fast passage to Guadeloupe, where they disembarked on 28 or 29 June 1635. The landing point was near Pointe-Allègre (Sainte-Rose). L'Olive established himself west of Pointe Allègre on the banks of what became the Vieux-Fort river, so called because Fort Saint-Pierre was built there. Du Plessis made his base east of Pointe Allègre and built a small fort on the river that became called Petit-Fort river. No traces of these forts remain, but an old map shows their position. The governors went to Saint Christophe for six weeks. Two weeks after they arrived d’Esnambuc sent colonists to settle in Martinique.

Pointe-Allègre proved to be a poor location, and many settlers died from sickness or starvation. The survivors moved to the south of the island beside the present Vieux-Fort. The Caribs helped them fell trees, sow the land, make canoes and fish for turtles and manatees. However, acting against the advice of Du Plessis, l'Olive decided to attack the Caribs and take their food and women. Jean du Plessis seems to have been gentle, human and prudent, and broke with the more brutal Charles de l'Olive. Du Plessis embarked for France with Jean François du Buc late in 1635 after the Compagnie de Saint-Christophe had been ruined. He died on 4 December 1635, apparently on the return boat.

== Sources ==
- 28 juin 1635 : la Guadeloupe devient une colonie française (in French), La France pittoresque, 26 May 2017
- Buc de Mannetot, Y.B. du; Renard-Marlet, F. (2013), "Jean VI François du Buc du Pacquerel, baron de Bretagnolles, Gouverneur de la Grenade", La Saga des Du Buc (in French), archived from the original on 2018-09-30
- Casagrande, Fabrice (2018), "Le destin d'une habitation-sucrerie de l'île de la Basse-Terre en Guadeloupe", Les nouvelles de l'archéologie (in French) (150), doi:10.4000/nda.3870
- Chalumeau, Fortuné (May 2008), "Arrivée des Premiers Habitants à la Guadeloupe en juin 1635 : les écrits des chroniqueurs et les réalités insulaires" (PDF), Généalogie et Histoire de la Caraïbe (in French) (214)
- Dessalles, Adrien (1847), Histoire politique et commerciale des Antilles ... (in French), vol. 1, France
- "La Colonisation Française", Planetantilles (in French), Planetcaraibes Association, archived from the original on 2018-09-30
- Moreau, Jean-Pierre (1992), Les Petites Antilles de Christophe Colomb à Richelieu: 1493-1635 (in French), KARTHALA Editions, ISBN 978-2-86537-335-2
