= Charles Plumier =

French botanist (1646–1704)

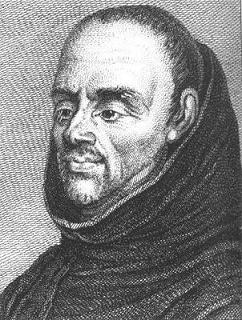
Charles Plumier

Charles Plumier (French: [ʃaʁl ply.mje]; 20 April 1646 – 20 November 1704) was a French botanist after whom the frangipani genus Plumeria is named. Plumier is considered one of the most important of the botanical explorers of his time. He made three botanizing expeditions to the West Indies, which resulted in a massive work Nova Plantarum Americanarum Genera (1703–1704) and was appointed botanist to King Louis XIV.

== Biography ==
Born in Marseille, at the age of 16, he entered the religious order of the Minims. He devoted himself to the study of mathematics and physics, made physical instruments, and was an excellent draughtsman, painter, and turner.

On being sent to the French monastery of Trinità dei Monti at Rome, Plumier studied botany under two members of the order, and especially under Cistercian botanist, Paolo Boccone. After his return to France, he became a pupil of Joseph Pitton de Tournefort, whom he accompanied on botanical expeditions.

He also explored the coasts of Provence and Languedoc. His work began in 1689, when, by order of the government, he accompanied collector Joseph Donat Surian to the French Antilles, as Surian's illustrator and writer. They remained a year and a half. As this first journey, written up by Plumier as Description des Plantes d'Amérique (1693), proved very successful, Plumier was appointed royal botanist. In 1693, by command of Louis XIV, he made his second journey, and in 1695 his third journey to the Antilles. While in the West Indies, he was assisted by the Dominican botanist Jean-Baptiste Labat. The material gathered was prodigious: besides the Nova Plantarum Americanarum Genera it filled the volumes of Plumier's Filicetum Americanum (1703) and several shorter pieces for the Journal des Savants and the Memoires de Trévoux.

In 1704, with his Traité des Fougères de l'Amérique in the press and about to start on his fourth journey, intending to visit the home of the true cinchona tree in Peru, he was taken ill with pleurisy and died at Puerto de Santa Maria near Cádiz.

At his death Plumier left 31 manuscript volumes containing notes and descriptions, and about 6,000 drawings, 4,000 of which were of plants, while the remainder reproduced American animals of nearly all classes, especially birds and fishes. The botanist Herman Boerhaave had 508 of these drawings copied at Paris; these were published later in a hommage by Burmann, Professor of Botany at Amsterdam, under the title: "Plantarum americanarum, quas olim Carolus Plumerius botanicorum princeps detexit", fasc. I-X (Amsterdam, 1755–1760), containing 262 plates. Plumier also wrote treatises for the Journal des Savants and for the Mémoires de Trévoux. Through his observations in Martinique, Plumier proved that the cochineal belongs to the animal kingdom and should be classed among the insects.

== Accomplishments ==
All natural scientists of the 18th century spoke of him with admiration. Tournefort and Linnaeus named in his honour the genus Plumeria, which belongs to the family Apocynaceae and is indigenous in about 40 species to Central America.

- Plumier identified and described Fuchsia, which he discovered on the island of Hispaniola in the Caribbean in 1696-7. He published his first description of Fuchsia (Fuchsia triphylla, flore coccineo) in 1703.
- Charles Plumier named the plant genus "Begonia" after Michel Bégon, the governor of Haiti, as a tribute for recommending Plumier to King Louis XIV as an official plant collector.
- French explorer and botanist Louis Feuillée was one of his pupils.
- His first work was Description des plantes de l'Amérique (Paris, 1693); it contained 108 plates, half of which represented ferns. This was followed by Nova plantarum americanarum genera (Paris, 1703–04), with 40 plates; in this work about 100 genera, with about 700 species, were redescribed. At a later date, Linnaeus adopted in his system, almost without change, these and other newly described genera arranged by Plumier. Plumier left a work in French and Latin ready to be printed entitled Traité des fougères de l'Amérique (Paris, 1705), which contained 170 excellent plates. The publication "Filicetum Americanum" (Paris, 1703), with 222 plates, was compiled from those already mentioned. Plumier also wrote another book of an entirely different character on turning, L'Art de tourner (Lyons, 1701; Paris, 1749); this was translated into Russian by Peter the Great. The manuscript of the translation is at St. Petersburg.

== List of selected publications ==
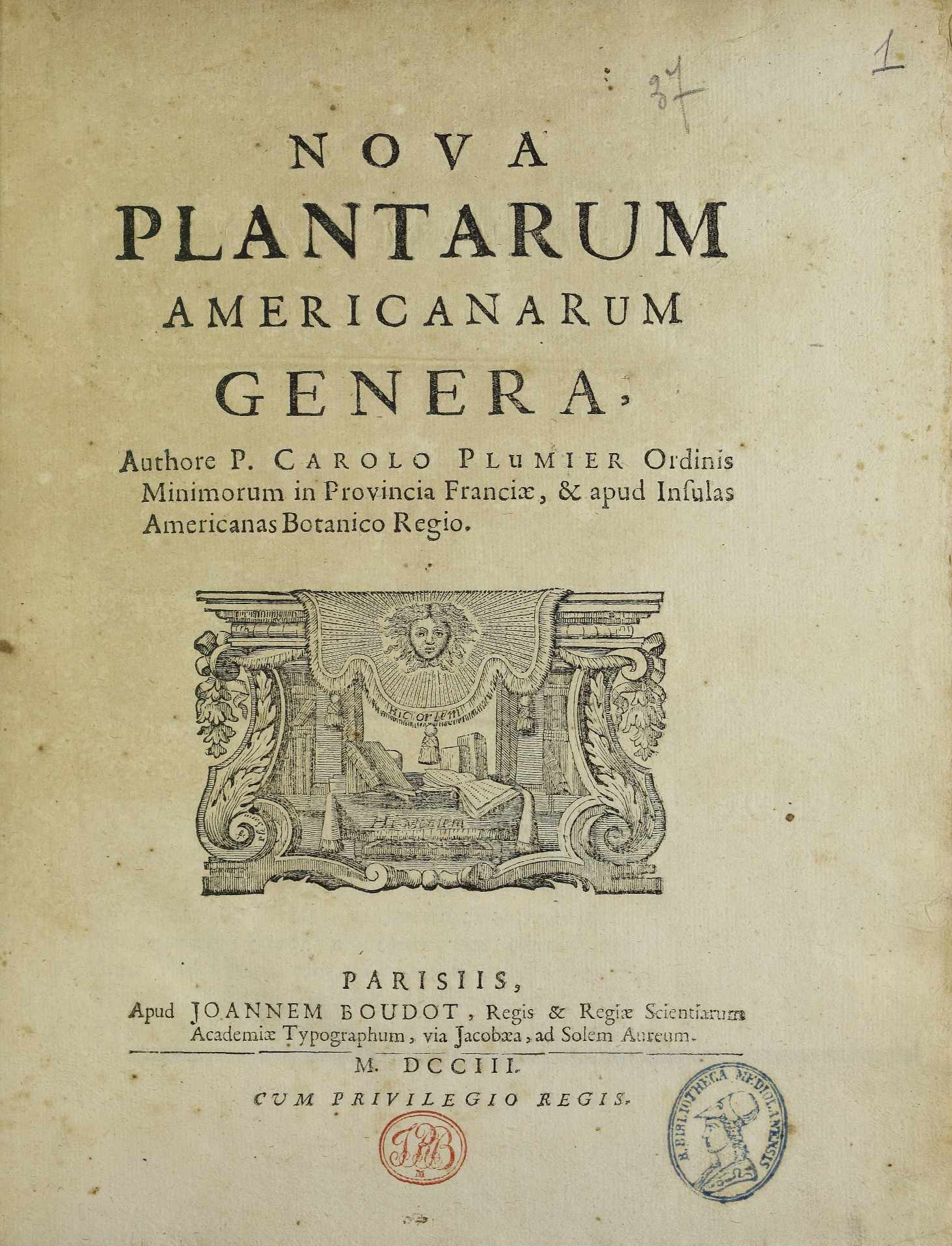
Nova plantarum americanarum genera, 1703

- Plumier, Charles (1703). Nova plantarum americanarum genera. Parisiis: Joannem Boudot.
- Description des plantes de l'Amérique on Botanicus.
- Plantarum americanarum...on Botanicus.
- Traité des fougères de l'Amérique on SICD Universities of Strasbourg
- L'Art de Tourner en Perfection edition of 1749 digitized by Christian LAVIGNE (Ars Mathematica), from the copy in the Bibliothèque de Verdun (Meuse, France)

== Legacy ==
His collection of plant specimens deposited in Paris at the National Museum of Natural History, France was curated by Alicia Lourteig in the twentieth century.

== Taxon named in Plumier's honor ==
- The goby Sicydium plumieri (Bloch, 1786) is named after him.

== See also ==
- List of Roman Catholic scientist-clerics
