= Noël Patrocles de Thoisy =

Noël Patrocles, seigneur de Thoisy

Lieutenant general of the American Islands
- In office 22 August 1645 – 25 February 1647
- Preceded by: Phillippe de Longvilliers de Poincy
- Succeeded by: Phillippe de Longvilliers de Poincy

Personal details
- Died: 1671

Noël Patrocles, seigneur de Thoisy (or Noel Patrocle; died 1671) was an early governor general of the French Antilles. He was appointed by the infant king Louis XIV during the regency of Anne of Austria at a time when the colonies were owned by the Company of the American Islands. His predecessor refused to recognise his appointment, forcefully prevented him from taking office on Saint Christopher Island, and eventually had him arrested and returned to France. In the aftermath the discredited company sold the islands to their local governors and was dissolved.

== Predecessor ==
Phillippe de Longvilliers de Poincy was named captain general by the Company of the American Islands on 5 January 1638 and was appointed the king's lieutenant general in the American islands on 25 February 1638. He was received in Martinique on 11 February 1639 and in Saint Christopher Island three days later. His commission was confirmed in 1640, 1641 and in January 1642. When the company would not give him the resources he needed to develop the islands he decided to do so in Saint Christopher at his own expense, while favouring his personal business interests over those of the company. He went deeply into debt. His efforts to develop production of cotton and indigo failed. He wrote to the company asking for reimbursement of the huge sums he had spent on developing Saint Christopher.

The governor of the English part of the island, Thomas Warner, worked with Poincy to suppress resistance to their authority from the independent-minded settlers, who were suffering from growing competition in the tobacco trade from the Americas. Poincy was a quarrelsome man and a harsh authoritarian and earned many enemies. The company therefore decided to terminate his commission and look for a replacement.

== Appointment ==
Noël Patrocle de Thoisy, a Burgundian, was chosen as the governor general to replace Poincy. His father was in favour with the regent, Anne of Austria, and she would have suggested his name. The company appointed Thoisy governor general on 26 December 1644. Noël Patrocles, chevalier, seigneur de Thoisy, a king's councillor, was named the King's lieutenant general of the American Islands on 20 February 1645. His commission gave him "the power to preside over the courts of justice of Saint Christopher." On 16 February 1645 the company arranged for a lettre de cachet from the king that ordered Poincy to return to France. Poincy's nephew, Robert de Longvilliers, who was ready to embark at La Rochelle, was handed the order to be delivered personally to Poincy. On 25 February 1645 the lords of the Company of the American Islands made Thoisy the Seneschal of Saint Christopher Island.

Poincy received the order to return on 13 March 1645. In July 1645 he expelled the intendant general, Clerselier de Leumont, who retired to Guadeloupe, and sent his most troublesome opponents back to France. Another lettre de cachet from the king dated 18 August 1645 formally demanded that Poincy leave the Antilles. On 22 August Longvilliers was confirmed as governor of Saint Christopher. On 1 September 1645 the company's Assembly of Lords in Paris commanded Robert de Longvilliers, governor of Saint Christopher, to receive Thoisy as the king's lieutenant general for the American islands.

== Disputed governor general ==
French colonies in the Lesser Antilles

Thoisy left Le Havre on 2 September 1645. He was accompanied by Jean-François de Boisfey, lieutenant de prévôté, Claude Meline and three archers, Fredon, Dufey and Saint-Ange. He landed in Martinique on 14 November 1645. Thoisy arrived at Guadeloupe on 19 November 1645. He reached Saint Christophe on 25 November 1645. His captain of the guard went ashore to deliver the orders for his reception, and was met by a body of armed men whose leader said on behalf of Poincy that the people of the island would accept no other leader than Poincy, and would not obey the king. Thoisy then went to the English base at Sandy Point, where Sir Thomas Warner told him that only Poincy's servant could land. On 28 November 1645 he returned to Guadeloupe.

Thoisy and Governor Charles Houël du Petit Pré of Guadeloupe made a plan to overcome Poincy by force. They dropped their plan when Governor Jacques Dyel du Parquet of Martinique arrived and proposed to kidnap Poincy's two nephews and use them as pawns to force submission. In January 1646 Thoisy, with the support of du Parquet, led an expedition against Poincy and captured Poincy's two nephews. Poincy's forces, supported by militia provided by Warner, then defeated the company from Martinique at the cost of 60 deaths. Thoisy escaped to Guadeloupe. Parquet took refuge first with the Capuchins and then with the English governor Warner, who promptly gave him up to Poincy. Three cousins of Jacques Dyel, captains Jacques Maupas Saint-Aubin and Pierre and Jean Lecomte fled to Martinique where they took an oath that recognised Thoisy as the king's lieutenant general.

Houël arrived from Guadeloupe on 28 January with a new expedition but was not able to disembark and returned to Guadeloupe on 3 February. Poincy expelled the Capuchins from Saint Christopher for having preached obedience to the king's orders, and ordered or allowed reprisals, sometimes death, for those who supported Thoisy. By June there was rioting throughout the islands. On 16 and 28 October 1646 the king ordered Poincy and Thoisy to exchange prisoners, thus implicitly giving Poincy an amnesty for his revolt since he was opposed to the company and its abuses rather than opposed to the king. In November 1646 Houël started a revolt against Thoisy, claiming that his presence on Gaudeloupe deprived him of his rights as governor. Thoisy managed to end the revolt on 22 November with a display of friendship for Houël. Thoisy heard that he was to be assassinated, and on 31 December 1646 embarked for Martinique, which he reached on 3 January 1647.

== Capture and return to France ==
On 31 December 1646 the officers of Martinique arranged with Poincy to exchange Thoisy for du Parquet. In January Poincy sent La Vernade to Martinique with five ships and 800 men to seize Thoisy. On 17 January 1647 Thoisy was arrested by the people of Martinique and delivered to Poincy in exchange for Du Parquet. Thoisy was taken to Saint Christophe, where he arrived on 24 January 1846. While passing Guadeloupe La Vernade embarked one of Poincy's nephews, Longvilliers, against the promise that Du Parquet would be released. The other nephew, Tréval, remained as a hostage. Thoisy was held prisoner in Saint Christopher, but due to expressions of sympathy for him by the population Poincy embarked him for France at night at the end of April, where he arrived on 17 May 1646. He said Poincy let him have just "two shirts and a greatcoat".

== Aftermath ==
Du Parquet was released on 6 February. He returned to Martinique on 9 February 1677. On 25 February the king, unaware of the events in the West Indies, named Poincy as lieutenant general in Saint Christophe for a year, and Thoisy as lieutenant general of Martinique and Guadeloupe, with his residence in Guadeloupe. After Poincy's term ended, Thoisy would become lieutenant general of all the islands. The lords of the company confirmed this on 26 March 1647.

After Thoisy's return to France a trial was launched in which Poincy was condemned to pay Thoisy 90,000 livres. The trial dragged out and did much damage to the company's reputation. The result of the chaotic events on the islands was that the Company of the American Islands was dissolved. The du Parquet family became owners of Guadeloupe and Martinique. A lawsuit between Poincy and Thoisy continued in 1649 and 1650, complicating settlement of the company's affairs, but finally on 24 May 1651 the Order of Malta bought Saint Christopher to be held for life by Poincy, when Saint Christopher, Saint-Martin and Saint Barthélemy would revert to the Order. The sale was ratified in March 1653 and the company ceased to exist.

== Sources ==
- Birch, Chris (2011-06-09), The Milk Jug Was a Goat, E-Books Publisher, ISBN 978-1-78069-018-6
- Dator, James F. (2011), Search for a New Land: Imperial Power and Afro-Creole Resistance in the British Leeward Islands 1624-1745 (PDF) (Doctoral thesis), University of Michigan
- Dubé, Jean-Claude (2005-04-28), The Chevalier de Montmagny: First Governor of New France, University of Ottawa Press, ISBN 978-0-7766-1705-3
- Germain, Jean-Christophe (March 1994), "Les frères MICHEL de la Martinique : ces cousins méconnus de BELAIN d'ESNAMBUC", G.H.C. (in French) (58)
- Germain, Michel (3 April 2015), Le Commandement de la Gendamerie de Martinique (1635-1899) (in French), Association du Patrimoine et des Traditions Gendarmerie
- Guillaume, Bernadette; Rossignol, Philippe; Du Chaxel (September 1982), "Un Projet De Vente De L'ile De Saint-christophe", Cahier (in French) (2), Centre De Genealogie Et D'histoire Des Iles D'amerique
- Martineau, Alfred; May, L-Ph (1935), Trois siècles d'histoire antillaise : Martinique et Guadeloupe de 1635 à nos jours (PDF) (in French), Paris: Société de l'histoire des colonies françaises et Librairie Leroux
- Saint-Méry, Médéric Louis Élie Moreau de (1784), Loix et constitutions des colonies françoises de l'Amerique sous le vent... (in French), L'Auteur
