= Charles de Montmagny =

French politician

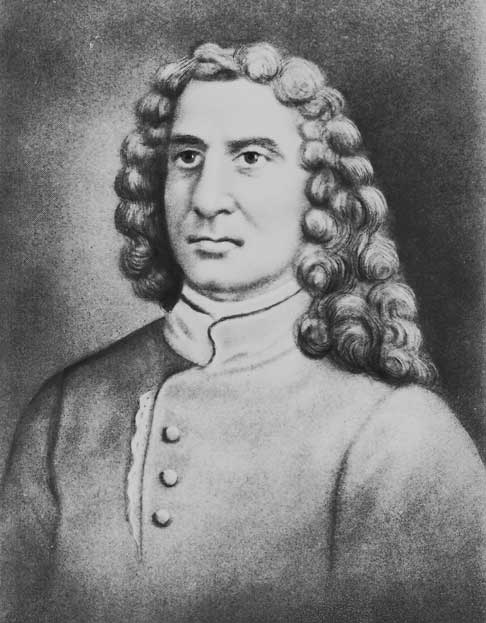
- Born: Charles Jacques Huault de Montmagny c. 1583 to 1599; Montmagny, Val-d'Oise, France
- Died: 1657; Saint Christopher, French West Indies
- Occupation: Governor of New France

Charles Jacques Huault de Montmagny (French pronunciation: [ʃaʁl də mɔ̃maɲi]; c. 1583 to 1599 – 4 July 1657) was governor of New France from 1636 to 1648. He was the first person to bear the title of Governor of New France and succeeded Samuel de Champlain, who governed the colony as Lieutenant General of New France. Montmagny was able to negotiate a peace treaty with the Iroquois at Trois-Rivières in 1645.

Born in Montmagny, Val-d'Oise, to Charles Huault (descended from a noble family headed by Jacques Huault, a counsellor under Henri II of France 1534 to 1580) and Antoinette Du Drac, Huault de Montmagny was educated by the Jesuits in Malta under the Order of the Knights Hospitaller in 1622. He later joined the navy and then became a member of the Compagnie de la Nouvelle-France, following the invitation of Cardinal de Richelieu in 1632.

His name 'Montmagny' roughly translated into the Iroquoian languages as "Onontio" (Great Mountain), a title which the Iroquois Confederacy used for all subsequent Governors of Quebec.

Late in his life he was commissioned by the Knights Hospitaller to oversee the Hospitaller colonies in the Caribbean. His presence there was ineffective, since he was bogged down in power struggles with the sitting governor, Phillippe de Longvilliers de Poincy. Montmagny died on Saint Christopher on 4 July 1657.

He became the inspiration of the character Montmagny by Cyrano de Bergerac in his novel L'autre Monde.

== Honours ==
de Montmagny's legacy is found in the province of Quebec:

- Montmagny, Quebec (1966) – formerly located in the Montmagny County and now in Montmagny Regional County Municipality since 1982
  - Montmagny Arena
- former provincial districts of Montmagny (1867–1972) and Montmagny-L'Islet (1972–2011)
- Montmagny Regional County Municipality are named after him.
- former federal ridings of Bellechasse—Etchemins—Montmagny—L'Islet (1996–2003) and Montmagny—L'Islet—Kamouraska—Rivière-du-Loup (2003-2023) – replaced by Côte-du-Sud—Rivière-du-Loup—Kataskomiq—Témiscouata since 2025.
- rue Montmagny are found in Sorel, Quebec, Quebec City, Laval, Quebec, Trois-Riveres, Quebec and Sherbrooke, Quebec
- avenue de Montmagny in Montreal
- Montmagny Airport and Hôpital de Montmagny in Cap-Saint-Ignace, Quebec

== See also ==
- Laurent Bermen
- Chateau St. Louis
- Fort Richelieu

Government offices
Preceded by Samuel de Champlain as Lieutenant General of New France	Governor of New France; 1636–1648	Succeeded by Louis d'Ailleboust de Coulonge
