= Michel Bégon (naturalist) =

French colonial governor (1638–1710)

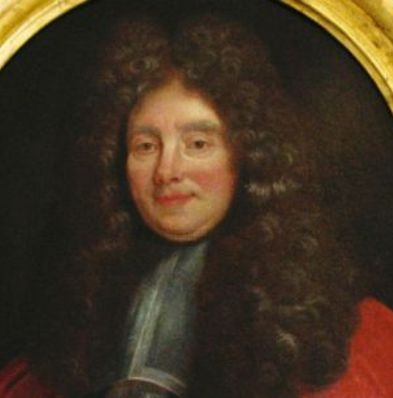
Michel Bégon

Michel Bégon (French: [miʃɛl beɡɔ̃]; 25 December 1638 – 14 March 1710) was a French colonial official and naturalist. He was intendant de la marine at the port of Rochefort and intendant of the généralité of La Rochelle, as well as a passionate plant collector (he met the naturalist Charles Plumier in the Antilles and gave him patronage, and Plumier later named the genus Begonia after him).

== Life ==
He was the son of Michel IV Bégon (1604 – 17 August 1683, Blois) and his wife Claude Viart. The Bégon family was an established court family, producing as many justices as finance ministers (two great-uncles were avocat and conseiller to the of Blois, and Michel V's father and grandfather were receveurs des tailles). Michel V devient became garde des Sceaux of the présidial of Blois (1662) then president of the tribunal (1667). He only entered the naval administration late in life, aged around 40, when Colbert made him treasurer of the marine du Levant at Toulon (1677) : this was the start of a happy career. Bégon later left the shores of the Mediterranean for north-western France, becoming commissaire général de la marine at Brest (24 November 1680) then at Le Havre (1681). He crossed the Atlantic to take up office as intendant of the Windward Islands (1 May 1682 – 24 November 1684). On his return from the Antilles, he won a new post with the Levant fleet which he had awaited since 4 November 1684, the date of his nomination to the post of intendant des galères at Marseille.

Michel V was seigneur of Picardière and Mirbelin (or Murbelaix), and also possessed an estate at Saint-Pierre on Martinique, which he sold in 1684 on leaving the Antilles. He was made Intendant of Saint-Domingue and set up his headquarters in the east of the island, Haiti, where he and Bertrand d'Ogeron got involved in the spice trade. In 1686, he became conseiller honoraire of the Parlement d’Aix (he was then intendant des galères at Marseille, a role he occupied from 1 May 1685 to 1688). On 1 September, Michel V Bégon became intendant of Rochefort (1688 – 13 March 1710). In 1694, he also obtained the intendance of the généralité of La Rochelle (1694–1710). His time at Rochefort considerably transformed the port and with Colbert du Terron (1669–1674) he was the prime mover in the development of its town and arsenal. His epitaph at the church of Saint-Louis de Rochefort reads Hanc nascentem urbem ligeam invenit / Lapideam reliquit (He found the city born in wood - he left it marble, referring to Augustus's words on the city of Rome). He is thus best known as a builder and it can be said that he was to Rochefort what Girardin de Vauvré was to Toulon.

== Family ==
Michel V was first cousin to Marie Charron, wife of Colbert, daughter of Jacques Charron (surintendant of Maria Theresa of Spain's household) and Marie Bégon. He married Marie-Madeleine Druilhon on 16 February 1665 at Blois - she was the daughter of Pierre, maître in the Chambre des comptes of Blois. Madeleine had been born in Blois, baptised in the parish of Sainte-Solenne on 29 March 1645 and died in the same town on 25 December 1697.

The marriage alliances by Michel and Madeleine's children were advantageous for the family's descendants:

- Michel, married Jeanne-Élisabeth de Beauharnois de La Boische (a family protected by the Phélypeaux which took over leadership of the navy in 1690).
- Catherine, married Jacques Barin, marquis de la Galissonnière (Nantes, 1646 – Poitiers, 1737) in 1691. Their son Roland-Michel Barrin de La Galissonière, like Catherine's brother Claude-Michel, went into the colonial administration of New France.
- Scipion-Jérôme was made bishop of Toul (11 January 1721), consecrated in the église des Minimes in Paris (25 April 1723) and received at Toul the following 31 August
- Claude-Michel Bégon de la Cour (15 March 1683 – 3 April 1748), known as le chevalier Bégon, married advantageously and entered the colonial administration of New France

== Bibliography ==
- Michel Vergé-Franceschi, Dictionnaire d’histoire maritime, Robert Laffont, coll. "Bouquins", Paris, tome I, p. 193 et tome II, p. 825
- Y. Gaubert, "Le Népotisme heureux de Colbert", dossier hors-série de L’Essentiel de La Rochelle, 2005
- Martine Acerra, Rochefort, la construction navale française (1661–1815), Librairie de l’Inde, Paris, 1993, 4 vol.
- Yvonne Bézard, Fonctionnaires maritimes et coloniaux sous Louis XIV, les Bégon, Albin Michel, Paris, 1932
- Michel Vergé-Franceschi, Les Officiers généraux de la marine royale (1715–1774). Origines, conditions, services, Librairie de l’Inde, Paris, 1990, 7 vol.,
