= Claude de Bermen de la Martinière =

Claude de Bermen de la Martinière (30 May 1636 – 14 April 1719) was born in France and came to New France in 1662. Through marriage, he became the owner of a large seigneury and held a number of important positions throughout his time in Canada.

La Martinière married the widow of Jean de Lauson in 1664 and began the development of the Lauson seigneury. He pursued a career in law and held various positions involving the Conseil Souverain and, subsequently, the renamed Conseil Supérieur. He was the acting governor general of the Conseil Souverain for a period and, in 1714, became the subdelegate of the intendant, Michel Bégon. His actions during an absence of Bégon brought to light the intendant's role in a grain shortage which was causing much hardship. Subsequent riots appear to give justification to La Martinière's concerns about a grain monopoly.

Claude had two sons, one of whom, Claude-Antoine de Bermen de La Martinière, had a distinguished career in the colonial regular forces.

Lake Bermen, in central Quebec, is named after him.
