= Claude-Antoine de Bermen de La Martinière =

Claude-Antoine de Bermen de La Martinière (12 July 1700 – 24 December 1761) was a Quebec-born son of Claude de Bermen de la Martinière.

de Bermen became an officer in the colonial regular troops. He enjoyed a career marked by important assignment and recognition of his efforts were marked by his receipt of the Order of Saint-Louis. Two important assignments highlighted his career. In 1737, he was appointed commander of Fort La Baye, (now Green Bay, Wisconsin). In 1751, he commanded Fort Beauséjour during its construction.
