= Château de la Montagne =

Coordinates: 17°20′01″N 62°44′02″W

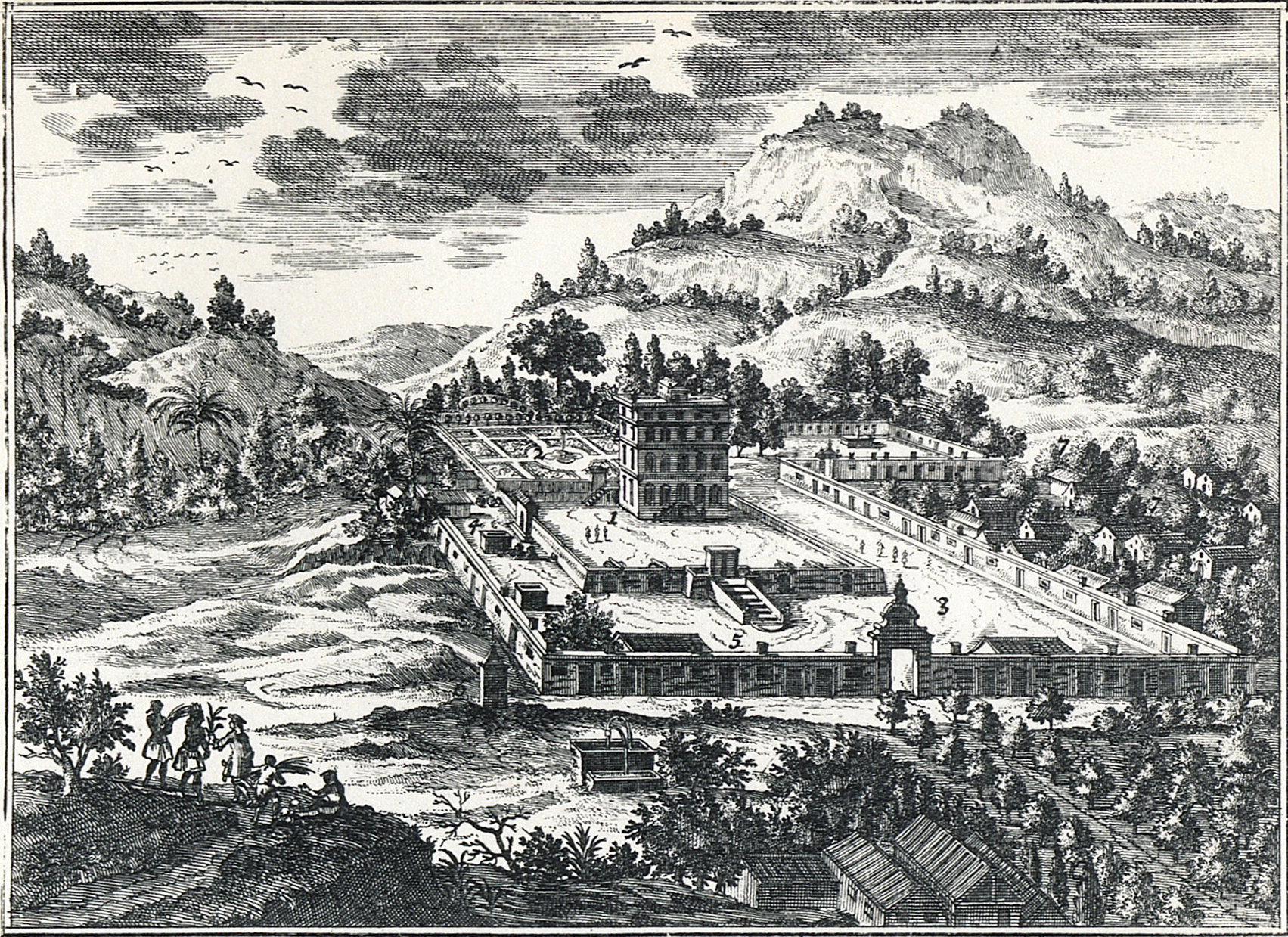
- 17th-century engraving of the Château de la Montagne
- Interactive map of the Château de la Montagne area
- Alternative names: De Poincy Château; Château de la Fontaine

General information
- Status: Destroyed
- Type: Palace
- Architectural style: Baroque
- Location: Saint Peter Basseterre Parish, Saint Kitts
- Construction started: 1640s
- Destroyed: 1689
- Owner: Phillippe de Longvilliers de Poincy

Technical details
- Material: Stone and brick
- Floor count: 3

The Château de la Montagne (Italian: Casa di Montagna), also known as the De Poincy Château or the Château de la Fontaine, was a fortified palace in Saint Peter Basseterre Parish on the island of Saint Kitts. It was built in the 1640s by Governor Phillippe de Longvilliers de Poincy, and it remained standing until it was destroyed in an earthquake in 1689. Built in the Baroque style, the château was regarded as one of the finest houses in the Caribbean.

== History ==
Phillippe de Longvilliers de Poincy, the French governor of St. Christopher and a knight of the Order of St. John, purchased an estate called La Fontaine for the sum of 110,000 livres in the early 1640s. The area was located on high ground overlooking the capital Basseterre, and de Poincy constructed the Château de la Montagne on this estate. The brick-makers, locksmiths, carpenters, stone-trimmers and limekiln builders involved in its construction had been brought from France. The estate was maintained by 100 servants and around 300 slaves.

Over the years, the château was fortified with outer and inner walls as well as an arsenal. The original entrance which faced the palace was replaced by a heavily fortified entrance on the east side. The château was manned by a 50-man guard, and it was defended by bronze cannons.

The château passed into the hands of the Order of St. John following de Poincy's death in 1660. It was probably destroyed in an earthquake in 1689. A few traces of the building, including a fountain and some red bricks, can still be seen today.

== Architecture ==
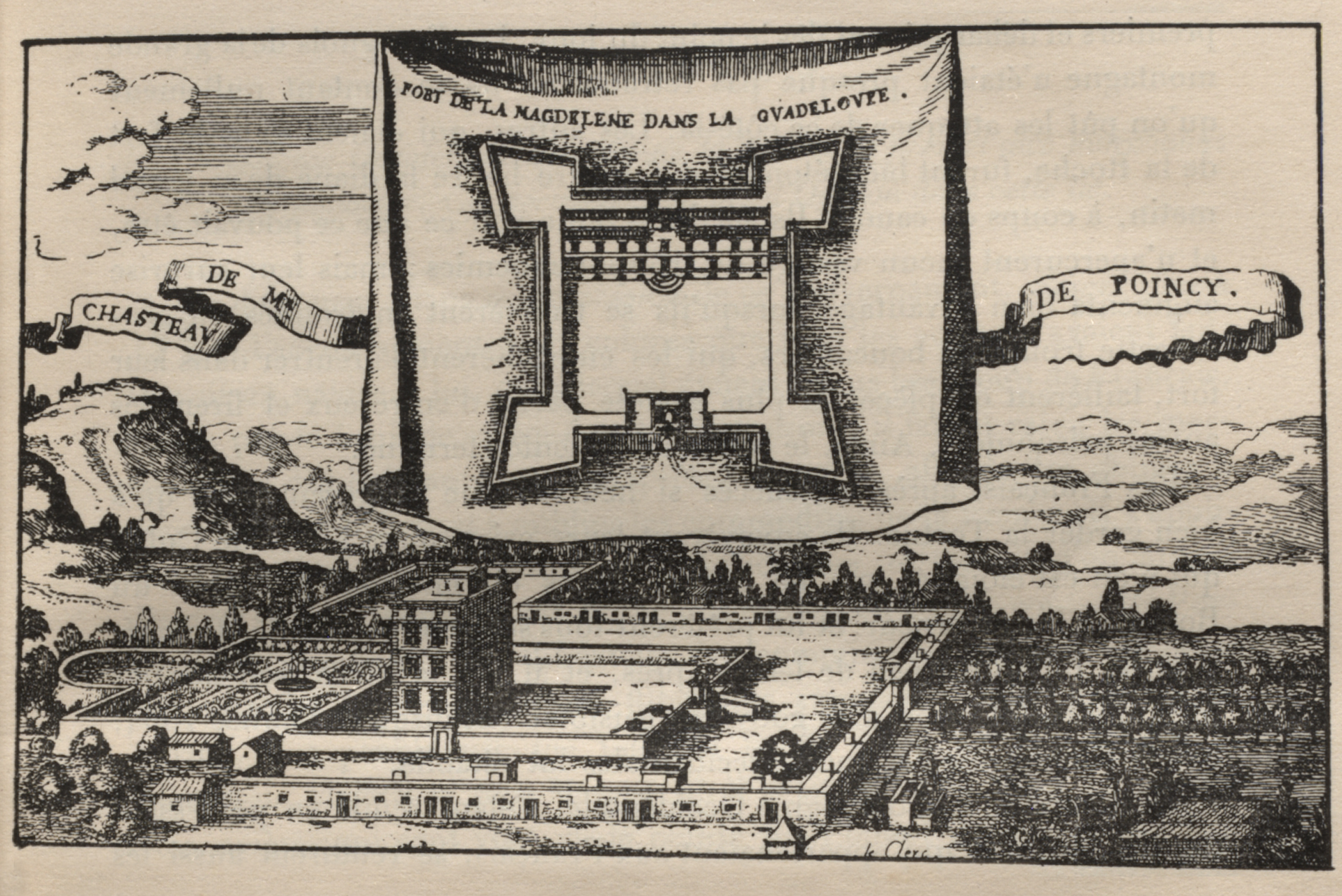
17th-century engraving showing a view of the Château de la Montagne (bottom) and a plan of Fort de la Madeleine in Guadeloupe (top)

The Château de la Montagne was built in a mixture of the Roman and French Baroque styles, and it was regarded as one of the finest houses in the Caribbean. The palace itself was a three-storey building which stood on a terrace and was approached by a large courtyard. It had a lavish interior, displaying a number of paintings and maritime maps. It also had an extensive library, the oldest known in the Caribbean.

The palace was fortified by walls and a ditch. There were a number of ancillary structures within the walls, including a church and quarters for de Poincy's workers and servants. The slaves' quarters were located outside the ditch.

The château had its own water supply, and it was surrounded by extensive gardens full of exotic flowers and plants. The gardens were decorated by a number of fountains. Stables and a pigsty stood to the rear of the gardens.

== Bibliography ==
- Freller, Thomas; Zammit, William (2015). Knights, Buccaneers, and Sugar Cane: The Caribbean Colonies of the Order of Malta. Malta: Midsea Books Limited. ISBN 9789993275527.
- Harrington, Joan F. (2003). Live de Life: Caribbean Island Style. Dorrance Publishing. ISBN 9780805960952.
