= Charles de Sales =

French soldier

Governor of Saint Christophe
- In office 11 April 1660 – 22 April 1666
- Preceded by: Phillippe de Longvilliers de Poincy
- Succeeded by: Claude de Roux de Saint-Laurent

Personal details
- Born: 1625 Thorens-Glières, Duchy of Savoy
- Died: 22 April 1666 (aged 40–41) Saint Christopher Island
- Occupation: Soldier

Charles de Sales (1625 – 22 April 1666) was a French soldier, a chevalier of the Knights Hospitaller, who was governor of the colony of Saint Christophe on Saint Christopher Island from 1660 to 1666 during a period when the island was divided between the French and the English.

== Early years (1625–60) ==
Charles de Sales was born in 1625 in the Château de Sales in what is today Thorens-Glières, Haute-Savoie, France. His father was Louis, comte de Sales (1577–1654), brother of Saint Francis de Sales, a noble of the Duchy of Savoy. Charles de Sales became a chevalier of the Order of Saint John of Jerusalem (Knights Hospitaller) in 1643, and fought in several campaigns against the Turks. He contributed to the defense of Crete in 1650.

In 1651 the Compagnie des Îles de l'Amérique went bankrupt and Phillippe de Longvilliers de Poincy persuaded Jean-Paul Lascaris-Castellar, grand master of the Order of Saint John of Jerusalem, to buy the French part of Saint-Christopher Island and the smaller islands of Saint Barthélemy, Saint Martin and Saint Croix for 120,000 écus. King Louis XIV remained sovereign of the islands, and Poincy was confirmed as governor of Saint Christophe. Charles de Sales was sent by the Order to govern with Poincy in 1657 on the death of the Chevalier Charles de Montmagny. (Note: Charles Jacques Huault de Montmagny was governor of New France from 1636 to 1648. After his return to France, he was assigned to Saint Christophe as successor to Poincy. He arrived early in 1653. Poincy would not relinquish control, and Montmagny resigned himself to waiting patiently on a farm outside the capital for Poincy to die. He died before Poincy on 4 July 1657.)

In 1659 the French and English in the Antilles concluded an offensive and defensive league against the Island Caribs in the Leeward Islands. In the event of hostilities being declared between the two countries the union was to continue for six months. The agreement was signed by Governor Charles Houël du Petit Pré of Guadeloupe and Charles de Sales for the French, and by governors Roger Osborne of Montserrat and James Russell of Nevis for the English.

== Governor of Saint Christophe (1660–66) ==
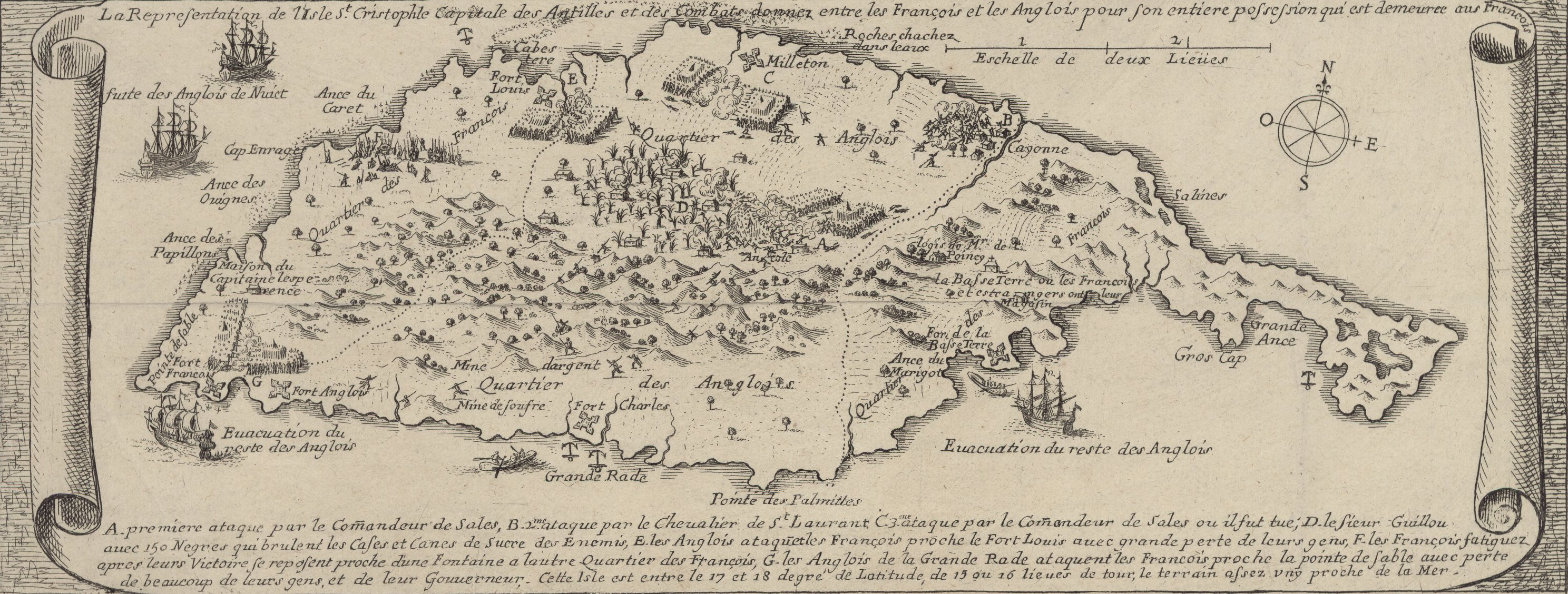
Saint-Christophe during the war of 1666

After Poincy died in 1660 the Order, which had still not paid all the purchase money, appointed Charles de Sales the new governor. He took office as lieutenant general and governor of Saint Christophe on 11 April 1660. Jean-Baptiste Colbert put pressure on the Hospitallers to return the islands to the crown. They ceded the islands to France in 1665, passing ownership to the new French West India Company. In February 1665 de Sales was confirmed as governor of Saint Christophe by the company.

The Second Anglo-Dutch War formally began in March 1665. In January 1666, with a growing threat of war between France and England, de Sales made a treaty with Governor William Watts of the English part of the island under which they agreed that when one party heard that war had been declared they would notify the other, and they would delay for three days before launching an attack. To confirm the agreement, de Sales sent a mission to the English governor general Francis Willoughby in Barbados, but he was evasive. France declared war on England in January 1666.

== War and death (1666) ==
Hostilities between the French and English on Saint Christopher broke out before the official declaration of war was received. Fighting began on 21 April 1666 (Gregorian calendar), and the French routed the numerically superior English forces two days later. De Sales was killed during the fighting, as was the English governor Watts. De Sales died on 22 April 1666. Claude de Roux de Saint-Laurent became governor of the whole island.

== Sources ==
- Cahoon, Ben, "Saint Kitts and Nevis", Worldstatesmen.org
- Dator, James F. (2011), Search for a New Land: Imperial Power and Afro-Creole Resistance in the British Leeward Islands 1624–1745 (PDF) (Doctoral thesis), University of Michigan
- Dubé, Jean-Claude (2005-04-28), The Chevalier de Montmagny: First Governor of New France, University of Ottawa Press, ISBN 978-0-7766-1705-3
- Gosselin, Charles, ed. (1829), Biographie universelle classique, ou dictionnaire historique portatif. (in French), vol. 3 S-Z, Paris
- Konstam, Angus (2011-12-20), Warships of the Anglo-Dutch Wars 1652–74, Bloomsbury Publishing, ISBN 978-1-84908-411-6
- Les Ordres Militaires du Moyen Age (in French), OSMCS Commanderie des Chevaliers d'Artois
- Lockerby, W. Earle (March 2008), "Le serment d'allégeance, le service militaire, les déportations et les Acadiens : opinions de France et de Québec aux 17e et 18e siècles", Acadiensis (in French), ISSN 1712-7432
- Oliver, Vere Langford (1894), The history of the island of Antigua, one of the Leeward Caribbees in the West Indies, from the first settlement in 1635 to the present time, London: Mitchell and Hughes
- Rossignol, Bernadette et Philippe (29 September 2001), L'ordre de Malte dans la Caraïbe (PDF), Fréjus: Centre d'Histoire & d'Études des Troupes d'Outre-Mer
