= Antoine-Denis Raudot =

Antoine-Denis Raudot (1679 – 28 July 1737) was the co-intendant of New France from 1705 to 1710, along with Jacques Raudot, his father.

Raudot was born in Versailles, France. His term as intendant of New France was the beginning of a long and distinguished career. It allowed him to demonstrate his ability in development of economic models that would work in an emerging market.
