= Phillippe de Longvilliers de Poincy =

French colonial administrator and rich slave plantations owner

Governor general of the French Antilles
- In office 15 February 1639 – 1651
- Preceded by: René de Béthoulat
- Succeeded by: Alexandre de Prouville de Tracy

Governor of Saint Christopher
- In office 15 February 1639 – 11 April 1660
- Preceded by: René de Béthoulat
- Succeeded by: Charles de Sales

Personal details
- Born: 1584
- Died: 11 April 1660 (aged 75–76) Basseterre, Saint Christopher

Phillippe de Longvilliers de Poincy (French pronunciation: [filip də lɔ̃vilje də pwɛ̃si]; 1584–1660) was a French nobleman and Bailiff Grand Cross of the Knights of Malta. He governed the island of Saint Christopher from 1639 to his death in 1660, first under the Compagnie des Îles de l'Amérique and later under the Knights of Malta themselves. Poincy was the key figure in the Hospitaller colonization of the Americas.

On 12 January 1638 Poincy set sail for the Caribbean on board La Petite Europe On February 20 he took up his commission as Lieutenant Governor of the Isles of America and Captain general of the French at St Kitts. He arrived wearing the regalia of the Knights of St John of Malta and soon dispensed with the authority of the French king, declaring "The people of St Kitts will have no other Governor than Poincy and will take no orders from the King of France."

In 1639 he reached an agreement with the English on St Kitts that neither nation should grow tobacco for one and a half years.

Poincy instructed one of his followers, the Huguenot Levasseur with sixty buccaneers, to drive the English out of Tortuga. Levasseur was successful, and on 6 November 1640 a treaty was drawn up between Poincy and Levasseur which allowed religious tolerance and trade between the two islands.

By 1642 Poincy started building the Château de la Montagne on his estate called La Fontaine. This was an elaborate building, credited as being one of the grandest ever constructed in the Americas, though today it is in ruins. The grounds of La Fontaine were also heavily planted with exotic tropical plants. The Poinciana (Caesalpinia pulcherrima) was named in his honor, the name later becoming secondarily associated with the Royal Poinciana (Delonix regia).

He had a Town Hall erected in Basseterre in what is now known as Church Street. This served as his administrative centre, where he dispensed justice and administered the colony.

On 26 December 1644, the French king sent Noël Patrocle de Thoisy to relieve him, Poincy refused to allow him to land. Eventually, Thoissy was sent back to France in chains. The Capuchins were also expelled at this time, for taking the side of Thoissy. The Jesuits were invited in to take their place. Poincy bought the nearby island of St Croix, which he bequeathed to the Knights of St John of Malta.

In 1648 he first seized the island of St Bartholomew, populated by 170 Europeans and fifty enslaved Africans. Then he sent his nephew, Robert de Lonvilliers, with 300 men to take over the French half of Saint Martin. This was ratified at the Treaty of Concordia. In 1650 he heard that the Spanish had evacuated St Croix, so he sent Vaugelan with two ships and one hundred and sixty men to capture it. The French had set fire to the trees which was why settlement was so difficult for the Spanish.

Following the intervention of the Knights of Malta in 1651, Poincy paid 90,000 livres to make peace with Thoissy. He persuaded Giovanni Paolo Lascaris, Grand Master of the Knights of Malta, to pay 120,000 livres for St Kitts, St Croix, St Bartholomew, and St Martin. Although Poincy was immediately appointed as governor, Charles Jacques Huault de Montmagny was soon appointed in his place. However, when Montmagny arrived, just as with Thoissy, Poincy refused to step aside. Montmagny was obliged to settle down in Cayenne, where he lived waiting for the death of Poincy. He would not live to see this, however, as he died first in 1657.

In 1653 the French king further entrenched the authority of the Knights of Malta on the four islands, retaining sovereignty over the islands with 1,000 crowns to be paid on the accession of each new French King.

Poincy died on 11 April 1660, at the age of 77. He was a Bailiff Grand cross of the Knights of Malta and Squadron commander of the French Brittany Fleet. He was buried in Basseterre, probably in the grounds of what is now St George's church.

He is credited with turning Basseterre into a successful Caribbean trading port. The annual Saint Kitts carnival troupe, Les Actors, are people descended from a troupe of Acrobats from Africa whom he had imported to Saint Kitts as his slaves and personal performers for parties at La Fontaine.

Poincy’s grandson Robert-Philippe also served as Governor of Grenada and Marie Galante (when it was a French colony).

Government offices
Preceded by René de Béthoulat de La Grange-Fromenteau	Governor of Saint-Christophe; 1639–1644	Succeeded by Robert de Longvilliers
Preceded by Robert de Longvilliers	Governor of Saint-Christophe; 1646–1660	Succeeded by Charles de Sales
