= Pierre Belain d'Esnambuc =

French colonial governor (1585–1636)

Pierre Belain, sieur d'Esnambuc
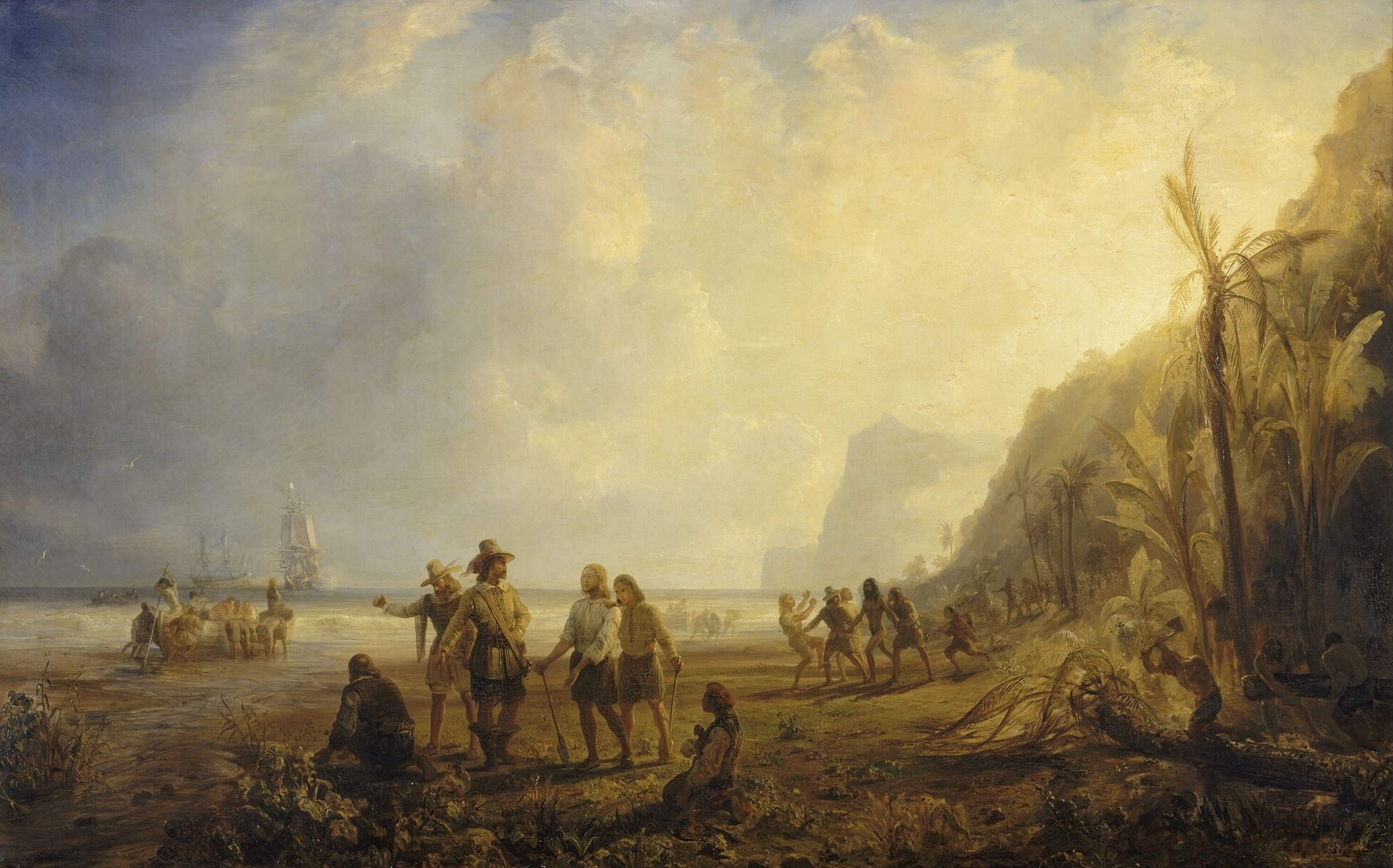
- Pierre Belain d'Esnambuc founding the colony of Martinique (by Théodore Gudin)

Governor general of the French Antilles
- In office 1628 – December 1636
- Preceded by: (none)
- Succeeded by: Pierre du Halde

Personal details
- Born: 9 March 1585 Allouville, Normandy, France
- Died: 1636 (aged 50–51) Saint Christopher Island (present-day Saint Kitts and Nevis)
- Occupation: Trader and adventurer

Pierre Belain, sieur d'Esnambuc (French pronunciation: [pjɛʁ bəlɛ̃ sjœʁ denɑ̃byk]; 1585–1636) was a French trader and adventurer in the Caribbean, who established the first permanent French colony, Saint-Pierre, on the island of Martinique in 1635.

== Biography ==
=== Youth ===
Pierre Belain d'Esnambuc was the fifth child of Nicholas Belain, lord of Quenouville and of Esnambuc. He was baptized in the Saint-Quentin church in Allouville-Bellefosse, in Normandy, on March 9, 1585.

The domain of Quenouville suffered under the Wars of Religion which laid waste the Pays de Caux. Nicholas Belain had to borrow 2,400 livres from the Duke of Cossé-Brissac which was inflated by interest. After his death in 1599, his children had to pay the debt. François, the eldest and heir of the domain of Quenouville, decided to sell the domain of Esnambuc. The other land was sold in 1610. Pierre Belain ought not therefore to have borne this title, which he nonetheless did during later years.

In 1603, when he was 18 years old, he embarked as "mathelot" on "le petit Orqui".

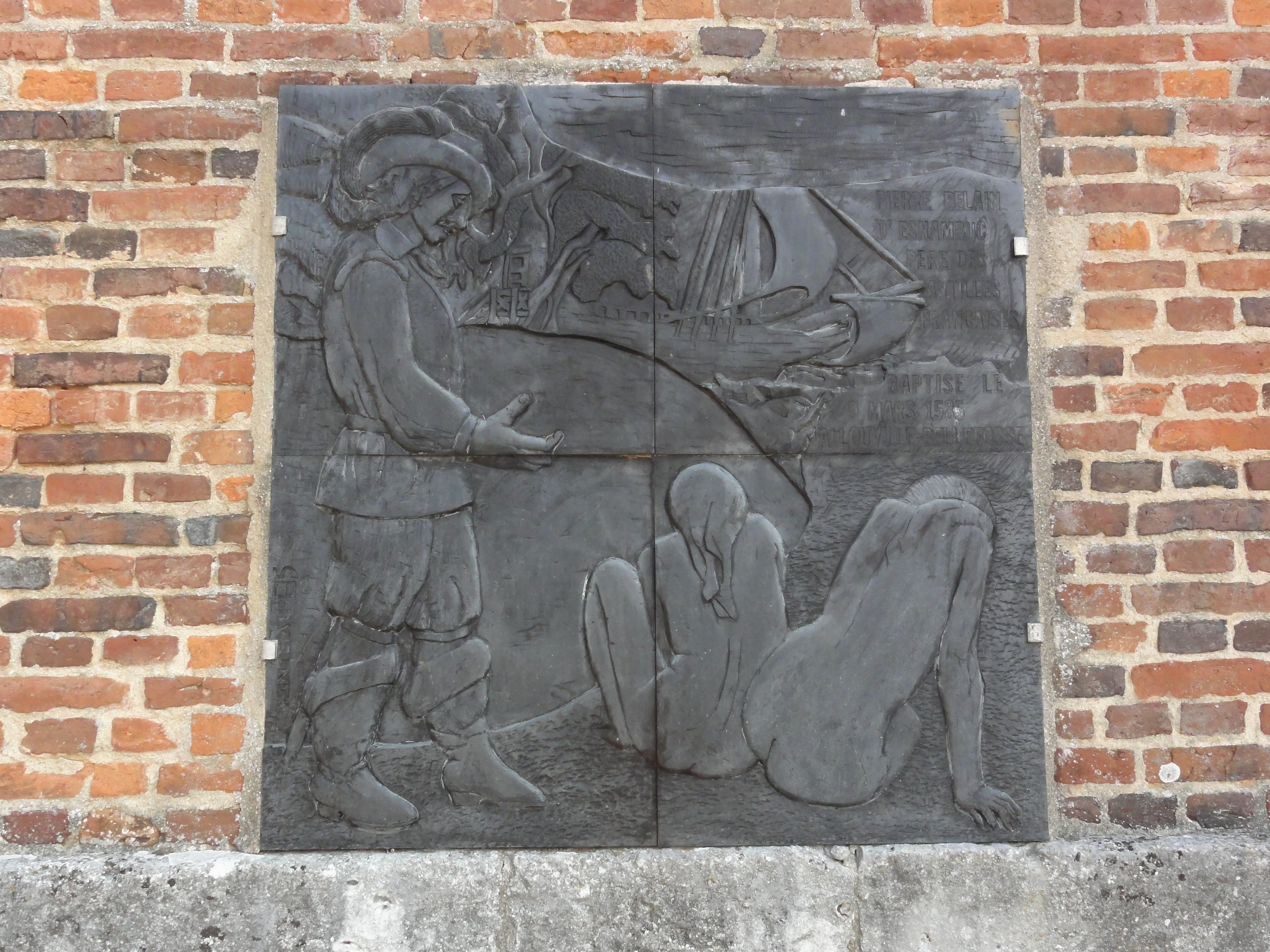
Allouville-Bellefosse, plaque commemoring Pierre Belain d'Esnambuc

=== Commerce and Freebooting ===
Belain, commanding a 14-gun brigantine with a crew of 40, practiced artisanal piracy. He also traded between Havre de Grace and the Caribbean, assisted by Jean Cavelet de Hertelay, a great shipowner of Havre and captain of "the Romaine." With the purchase of the Marquisate of Graville, Hertelay became the agent of Richelieu, purchaser of several maritime domains.

Upon the Peace of Vervins, the French refused to recognize the right of the pope to award sovereignty of the ocean at will. A verbal clause stipulated that below the meridian of El Hierro, called the Line of Friendship, force would decide sovereignty and war could reign without affecting the peace between the nations in Europe. The Twelve Years' Truce signed in 1609 between the Netherlands and Spain, mediated by England and France, allowed the development of navigation to the Caribbean. Navigation being freed, Pierre Belain sought to affiliate himself with Urbain du Roissey, lord of Chardonville, to rebuild his fortune through navigating the ocean, the only risk being to encounter a Spanish ship. For 15 years, he traversed the seas with no great success.

In 1620, he was captain of the Marquise, and in 1623 he was helmsman of the Espérance. In 1623, a race against a Spanish Galleon backfired on the pirate, who found refuge on Saint Kitts where 400 British colonists had just arrived. The English and the French, weakened by their respective voyages, came to an agreement to share the little Caribbean island.

=== Colonization ===
In 1626 he returned to France, where he won the support of Cardinal Richelieu to establish French colonies in the Caribbean region by convincing him of the opportunity for profitable cultivation of tobacco, sugar cane, achiote, and indigo. It would also be an opportunity to extend the influence of France and Christendom. Richelieu became a shareholder in the Compagnie de Saint-Christophe, created to accomplish all this with D'Esnambuc at its head.

In 1627, Esnambuc left Havre to set up on Saint Kitts, in which he had already been preceded by the Huguenots under François Levasseur. Since Saint Kitts had been shared with the English under the explorer Thomas Warner, the English occupied the central portion while the French took the two extremities. The conditions were very difficult for the French colonists who were poorly provisioned by the company. They survived through trade with the Dutch. In 1628 a French pirate ship seized two caravels containing 57 Moriscoes and Mulattoes whom they unloaded at Saint Kitts. This is the first known introduction of slavery in a French colony. Trade with foreign slave ships, though illegal, was tolerated by colonial authorities in the face of the rising demand for labor. In the beginning of 1629, the French colony on Saint Kitts counted 500 Frenchmen and 52 Blacks (of which 40 were men and 12 were women).

In September 1629 the Spanish destroyed the French establishments on Saint Kitts and the colonists fled to surrounding islands.

=== Compagnie des Îles de l'Amérique ===
After the failure of the Compagnie de Saint-Christophe, Richelieu granted Belain the Compagnie des Îles de l'Amérique, created February 12, 1635. The company tasked Jean du Plessis d'Ossonville and Charles Liénard de L'Olive with the colonization of Guadeloupe. Meanwhile, Esnambuc went ashore in Martinique with 150 French colonists from Saint Kitts, then founded the fort of Saint-Pierre on behalf of the French crown and the Compagnie des Îles de l'Amérique. He left Jacques Dupont with command of the fort and regained Saint Kitts. He took possession of Dominica in November 1635 guided by a captain from Dieppe, Pierre Baillardel. Dupont, after having withstood an attack of Caribs, was taken prisoner by the Spanish during a voyage to check on Saint Kitts. Esnambuc subsequently named his nephew, Jacques Dyel du Parquet, as governor of Martinique in September 1636.

Having spent six months on Martinique, D'Esnambuc returned to Saint Christopher, where he soon died of illness, according to Jean-Baptiste Du Tertre.

Parquet inherited D'Esnambuc's authority over the French settlements in the Caribbean. He remained in Martinique and did not concern himself with the other islands. Open warfare led to the French expelling surviving Carib from St Christophe in 1644.

== Legacy ==
Upon hearing of the death of Pierre Belain d'Esnambuc, Richelieu declared: "The king has lost one of his most valuable servants."

A statue of the adventurer was erected in the Place de la Savane in Fort-de-France in 1935, on the occasion of the tricentennial of his taking of Martinique on behalf of King Louis XIII. In the 1970s, the statue was moved to the southwest corner of the square. As a symbol of French colonialism, it is occasionally the object of graffiti, for example in October 2018 and February 2020. On July 26, 2020, the statue was toppled by anticolonial activists, decapitated, and struck by sledgehammers to the sound of drums and chanting.

There is a "rue Belain d'Esnambuc" in Havre.

A banana boat in the service of the Compagnie Générale Transatlantique (acquired from Norway) bore his name from 1939 until 1942, when it was commandeered by the Kriegsmarine, repurposed as a minelayer, and rechristened "Pommern". It sank in the Mediterranean in 1943 after striking an Italian mine.

In 1935, for the three hundredth anniversary of the French Antilles, the French postal service released several postage stamps engraved with d'Esnambuc's image by Jules Piel. The 40 centime stamps were grey, the 50 centime stamps were vermillion, and the 1 franc 50 stamps were blue.

In 1946, the Caisse Centrale de la France d'Outre-Mer issued a 50 franc bank note bearing an image of Belain d'Esnambuc.

A long road of his hometown in Allouville-Bellefosse, and the village hall at 20 rue Jacques Anquetil, facing the office of tourism, built in 1945 and completely renovated in 2017, bears his name.

A bas relief, a square about 3 feet on each side, sculpted in slate, has been affixed since 1985 (for the four hundredth anniversary of his birth) in the lower part of the southern wall of the belltower-porch—above the relief is a great clock—on the side of the rue du Doctor Patenotre, facing the Chêne chapelle in Allouville-Bellefosse.

For the Heritage Days of September 17 and 18 2016, the commune of Allouville-Bellefosse organized an exposition dedicated to the navigator in its church Saint-Quentin, as well as a conference on him given by Marie-José Mainot.

== See also ==
- History of Saint Kitts and Nevis

Government offices
| New creation | Governor of Saint-Christophe; 1625–1636 | Succeeded by Pierre du Halde |
