= Jacques Raudot =

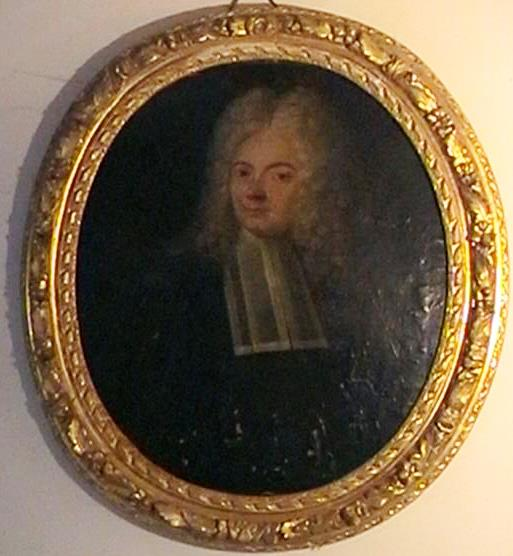
Jacques Raudot

Jacques Raudot (1638 - 20 February 1728, Paris) was the co-Intendant of New France between 1705 and 1710 with his son Antoine-Denis Raudot.

In 1709 Raudot issued an ordinance to clarify whether individuals could legally own slaves, in New France. According to the Dictionary of Canadian Biography, Raudot "legalized the enslavement of Negroes and Pawnees."
