= Laurent Bermen =

Laurent Bermen (fl. 1647–1649) was a notary at Quebec.

Historically, the first clerk of the court, Nicolas, to sign an act in New France did so in 1621. Bermen, in drafting acts during his tenure, referred to himself as the royal notary. This was not within his rights to do so since that type of appointment could only be made by the king or his representative. Nevertheless, he created 39 notarial acts in his time in the New World. Four more notaries who followed Bermen in the post acted on his precedent and used the title. They were: Claude Lecoustre (1647–1648), Guillaume Audouart (1649–1663), Jean Durand (1653–1654) and Louis Rouer de Villeray (1653–1657). None legally held the title.

Bermen would have fallen under the authority of the Company of One Hundred Associates (Compagnie des Cent-Associés) in regards to his work as a notary. It would seem that they had some ability to shape the laws of this new colony.
