= Ars Mathematica (organization) =

Arts organization based in Paris, France

Ars Mathematica (Latin for "[the] Mathematical Art") is a Paris, France-based, international and non-profit organization founded in 1992 by Christian Lavigne and Alexandre Vitkine to promote the interconnection between art, science, and technology, with a particular focus on digital sculpture.

Since 1993, the association has organized a biennial exhibition of digital sculpture. "Intersculpt '95", the second show, was jointly sponsored by U.S.-based Computer and Sculpture Forum. During the expo, a transatlantic videoconference between Philadelphia and Paris resulted in the creation of a shared sculpture, "the Temple Hands", based on a concept by David Morris, and the first transatlantic telesculpture, sent by Stewart DICKSON via the Internet and materialized in Paris.

Since 1996, many digital sculptures showed during the Intersculpt events are displayed on Active Worlds, in the DAAP zone founded, curated and managed by the Pr. Derrick WOODHAM (professor Emeritus at the University of Cincinnati).
