= Charles Liénard de L'Olive =

French colonial leader

Charles Liénard, sieur de L'Olive

Governor of Guadeloupe
- In office 28 June 1635 – 1640
- Preceded by: none
- Succeeded by: Jean Aubert; Charles Houël du Petit Pré

Personal details
- Born: c. 1601
- Died: 1643
- Occupation: Soldier, colonist

Charles Liénard, sieur de L'Olive (c. 1601 – 1643) was a French colonial leader who was the first governor of Guadeloupe.

== Life ==
Islands in the Lesser Antilles

Charles Lienard, squire and sieur de L'Olive, was the son of Pierre Lienart and Françoise Bonnart of Chinon.

The French adventurers Pierre Belain d'Esnambuc and Urbain Du Roissey reached Saint Christopher Island (Saint Kitts) in 1625, and were struck by the potential of the island as a colony once the indigenous Island Caribs were removed. They returned to France and in 1626 with the support of Cardinal Richelieu founded the "Association des Seigneurs de la Compagnie des Isles de l’Amérique". The private venture had the mandate to settle Saint Christophe, Barbados and other neighboring islands at the entrance to Peru that were not possessed by any king or Christian prince. They engaged over 500 men to work on the islands for three years, sailed in three ships in February 1627, and after a difficult crossing landed in Saint-Christophe almost three months later.

The first French settlers suffered from famine and fought with the Caribs and the English, who also had a settlement on the island. In November 1629 the Spanish admiral Fadrique de Toledo drove the French from the island. They left on two ships and attempted colonization of Antigua and Montserrat. They returned to Saint-Christophe in 1630. L'Olive was appointed lieutenant governor to Esnambuc on Saint Christophe in 1631. He sent his capable young assistant Guillaume d'Orange to visit the nearby islands of Guadeloupe, Dominica and Martinique and determine their potential as colonies. D'Orange thought Guadeloupe had the greatest promise. Spanish attempts to colonize the Guadeloupe archipelago in the first half of the 16th century had failed, and since then European sailors had only used it as a resting place.

== Guadeloupe expedition ==
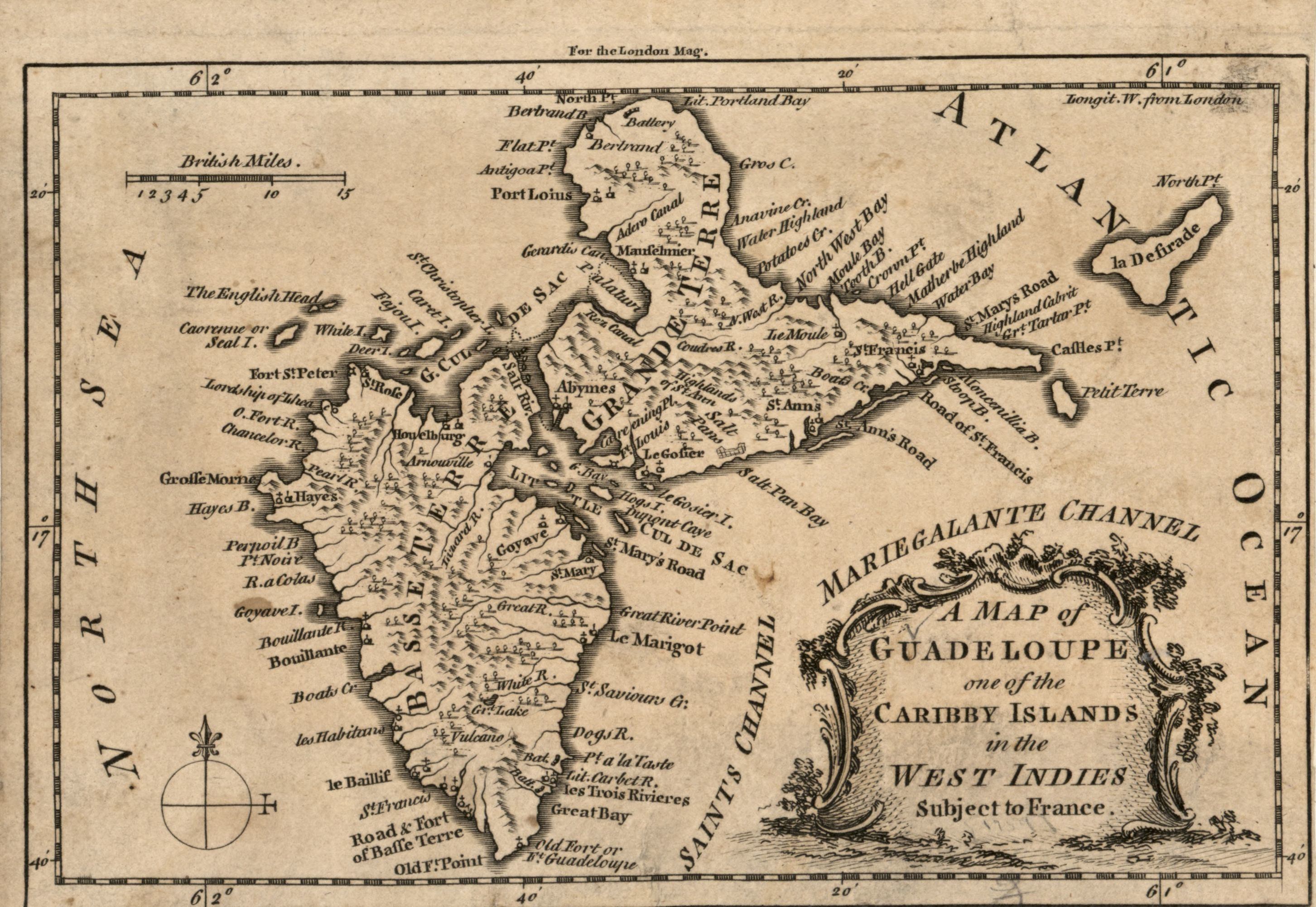
1759 map. Fort St. Peter (Saint-Pierre) is shown on the northern point of Basse-Terre Island, and Old Fort on the south point.

L'Olive and d'Orange sailed to France in late 1634. Their purpose was to obtain permission from the Compagnie des îsles d'Amérique to settle Guadeloupe. They met Jean du Plessis d'Ossonville in Dieppe, who agreed to join the project. Du Plessis was related to Cardinal Richelieu, which may have been a factor in his being invited as a partner. Duplessis also owned a sturdy ship. The partners went on to Paris to negotiate with the Company. They signed a treaty with the company in February 1635 in which they engaged to take 200 men to settle Dominica, Martinique or Guadeloupe.

Under the contract the Company would provide arms, ammunition and the protection of the government. L'Olive and Du Plessis would have settled at least 800 men after ten years, not counting women and children. They would pay a petun (tobacco) fee, and at the end of the contract the settlements, forts and dwellings would all become property of the company. The contract, signed on 14 February 1635, commissioned l'Olive and Du Plessis to "command together on the island they would inhabit."

The two founders could not pay all the expenses, so brought in the merchants of Dieppe in exchange for a share of the profits over six years. The Dieppe shipowners Faucon and Delamare assisted the expedition. They had to supply them with 2,500 men. The partners remained subordinate to d'Esnambuc, whom King Louis XIII named governor general of the French Antilles on 7 March 1635. L'Olive married Marie Philibert in Chinon in 1635. His wife was a daughter of Jean Philibert, former advisor to the king at the royal seat of Chinon, and Marie Poulain.

The settlers left Dieppe on 25 May 1635 with 554 people, including four Dominican missionaries. There were 40 Norman families of peasant origin, 30 prostitutes from the port of Dieppe or Paris, and 400 hired laborers (alloués). Those who paid for their voyage would be given concessions to grow tobacco or sugar in the island, which they would work using slaves from Africa and hired hands from France. The alloués could not pay for their trip, but were on contract to work for three years. They were nicknamed trente-six mois (36 months) after the term they had to serve. They would be treated, beaten and sold as slaves. However, some of them would later obtain concessions.

Jean François du Buc, who would be Governor of Grenada from 1658 to 1660, was a leading member of the expedition, as was Constant d'Aubigné, father of Françoise d'Aubigné, Marquise de Maintenon. The expedition sailed in two ships. One, with 400 men, carried l’Olive, Duplessis and two of the Dominicans, and the other carried 150 men and the other two Dominicans. They reached Martinique on 25 June 1635, which they claimed for the king, then moved on because they found the island mountainous, cut by precipices and gullies and infested with poisonous snakes.

== Settlement of Guadeloupe ==
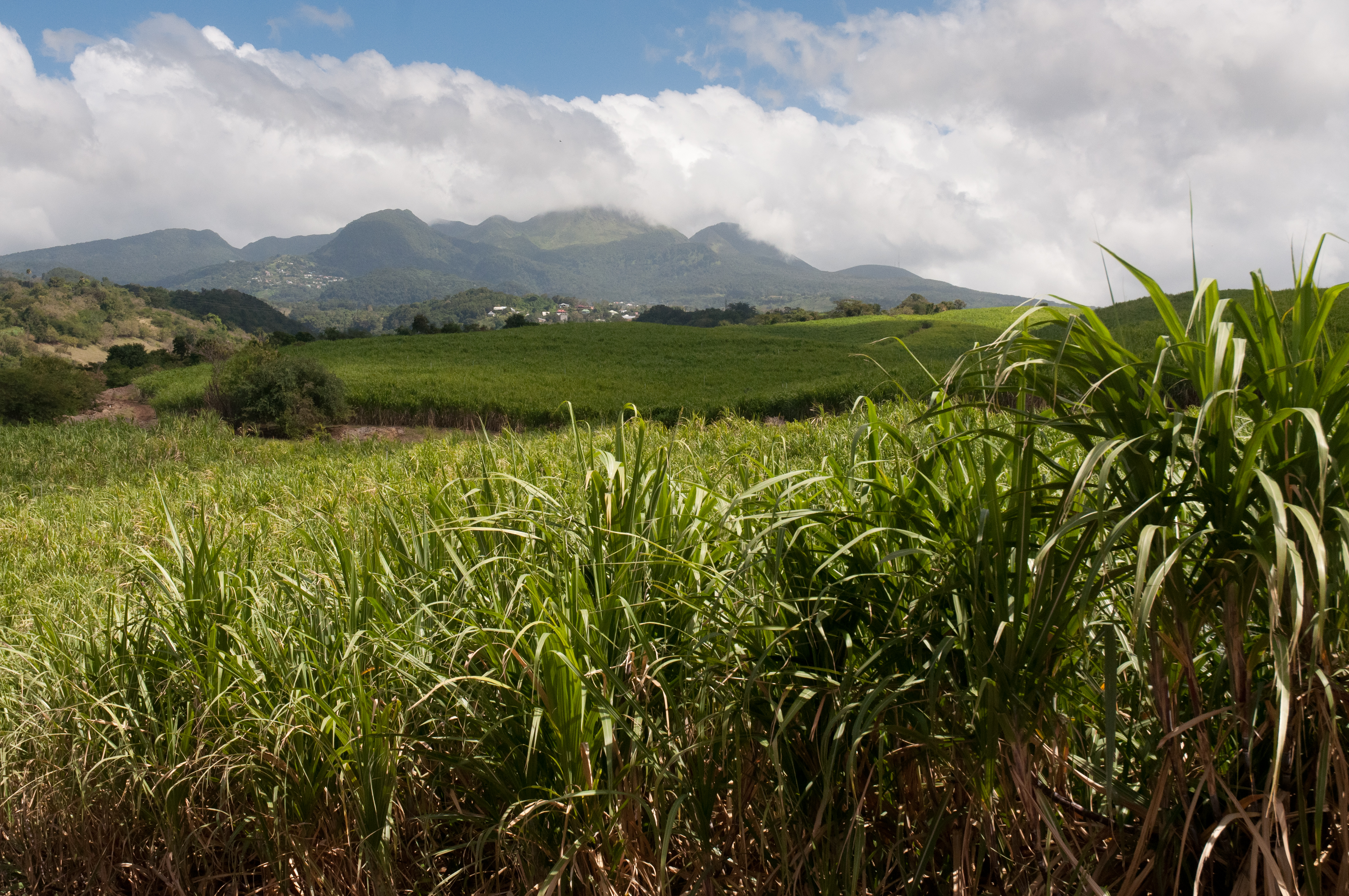
Sugar cane plantation on Guadeloupe

The ships made a very fast passage to Guadeloupe, where they disembarked on 28 or 29 June 1635. The landing point was near Pointe-Allègre (Sainte-Rose). L'Olive established himself west of Pointe Allègre on the banks of what became the Vieux-Fort river, so called because Fort Saint-Pierre was built there. Du Plessis made his base east of Pointe Allègre and built a small fort on the river that became called Petit-Fort river. No traces of these forts remain, but an old map shows their position. The governors went to Saint Christophe to confer with d’Esnambuc. D'Enambuc saw the Guadeloupe venture as a threat to his authority, and took 150 picked colonists from Saint Christophe to Martinique, which he reached on 1 September 1635. He built the crude 3-gun Fort Saint-Pierre in two weeks before returning to Saint Christophe.

The expedition was underfunded and badly organized. Father Jacques du Tetre records that they failed to stop in Barbados, where they could have bought food, and had only enough to eat for two months when they reached Guadeloupe. At first the Caribs were friendly, traded with the French and gave them fish and local produce. The French did not trust the Caribs, who stopped visiting after a skirmish. The settlers suffered from a famine in which many died. In desperation, the French decided to attack the Caribs, kill the men and take their women and possessions. L'Olive let them take over the gardens of the Caribs and steal their food. Cardinal Richelieu had given L'Olive the mission of converting the Caribs to Catholicism, which caused further problems.

Some of the settlers left the colony and joined the Caribs, who treated them well. They learned to speak the Kalinago language, intermarried with the local people, and adopted local ways of building and cooking. Jean du Plessis seems to have been gentle, humane and prudent, and broke with the more brutal Charles de l'Olive. He took refuge with the Caribs, with whom he was friendly. Du Plessis embarked for France with Jean François du Buc late in 1635 after the Compagnie de Saint-Christophe had been ruined. He died on 4 December 1635, apparently on the return boat.

The remaining colonists suffered from Carib reprisals and from yellow fever. They moved to the south of the island beside the present Vieux-Fort. Theophraste Renaudot brushed over the early problems with the French colonization of Guadeloupe in his Gazette of February 1638. He wrote, "The Sieur d'Olive did everything to gain the affection of the savages in this island ... he gave them crystals, mirrors, combs, whistles, needles and pins and other bagatelles. Between 1635 and 1641 L'Olive massacred the Caribs in Basse-Terre Island. On 2 December 1837 L'Olive was named captain general by the company, under the authority of the king's lieutenant general of the islands of America.

Du Tetre relates that for his sins L'Olive was stricken by blindness and insanity. On 25 November 1640 Jean Aubert was named governor in place of L'Olive. Aubert did not spend any time in Guadeloupe, although he had a fine two-story wooden house built near the Sens River. L'Olive died in 1643. Charles Houël du Petit Pré, named governor in place of Aubert, reached Fort Royal on 5 September 1643. He found everything in poor repair, and the gardens wrecked by a hurricane. The Rue du Marché in the former Paris municipality of La Chapelle was renamed Rue L'Olive^{(fr)} in honor of the former governor by a decree of 10 February 1875. In October 2011 the Paris council decided to eliminate the reference to colonialism, and renamed the road to Rue de L'Olive.

== Sources ==
- 28 juin 1635 : la Guadeloupe devient une colonie française (in French), La France pittoresque, 26 May 2017
- Alphand, Adolphe; Deville, Adrienfirst3=Émile; Hochereau (1886), Ville de Paris: recueil des lettres patentes, ordonnances royales, décrets et arrêtés préfectoraux concernant les voies publiques, Paris: Imprimerie nouvelle (association ouvrière).
- Bailey, Gauvin Alexander (2018-06-06), Architecture and Urbanism in the French Atlantic Empire: State, Church, and Society, 1604-1830, MQUP, ISBN 978-0-7735-5376-7
- Buc de Mannetot, Y.B. du; Renard-Marlet, F. (2013), "Jean VI François du Buc du Pacquerel, baron de Bretagnolles, Gouverneur de la Grenade", La Saga des Du Buc (in French), archived from the original on 2018-09-30
- Casagrande, Fabrice (2018), "Le destin d'une habitation-sucrerie de l'île de la Basse-Terre en Guadeloupe", Les Nouvelles de l'Archéologie (in French) (150): 36–39, doi:10.4000/nda.3870
- Chalumeau, Fortuné (May 2008), "Arrivée des Premiers Habitants à la Guadeloupe en juin 1635 : les écrits des chroniqueurs et les réalités insulaires" (PDF), Généalogie et Histoire de la Caraïbe (in French) (214)
- CHINON § Mariage de Charles LIENARD, écuyer sieur de L'OLIVE, gouverneur pour le Roi des Iles des Indes Occidentales, fils de... (in French), Archives de France
- Dessalles, Adrien (1847), Histoire politique et commerciale des Antilles ... (in French), vol. 1, France
- Garraway, Doris L (2005-06-17), The Libertine Colony: Creolization in the Early French Caribbean, Duke University Press, ISBN 0-8223-8651-8
- Guadeloupe (1875), Annuaire de la Guadeloupe et dépendances (in French)
- "La Colonisation Française", Planetantilles (in French), Planetcaraibes Association, archived from the original on 2018-09-30
- "La rue l'Olive et le colonialisme", Le Parisien (in French), 17 October 2011
- Margry, Pierre (1863), Origines transatlantiques: Belain d'Esnambuc et les Normands aux Antilles, d'après des documents nouvellement retrouvés (in French), A. Faure
- Marley, David (2005), Historic Cities of the Americas: An Illustrated Encyclopedia, ABC-CLIO, ISBN 978-1-57607-027-7
- McCabe, Ina Baghdiantz (2008-06-01), Orientalism in Early Modern France: Eurasian Trade, Exoticism, and the Ancien Régime, Berg, ISBN 978-1-84788-463-3
- Société d'histoire de la Guadeloupe (2004), Bulletin de la Société d'histoire de la Guadeloupe (in French), Archives départementales
