= Carib expulsion from Martinique =

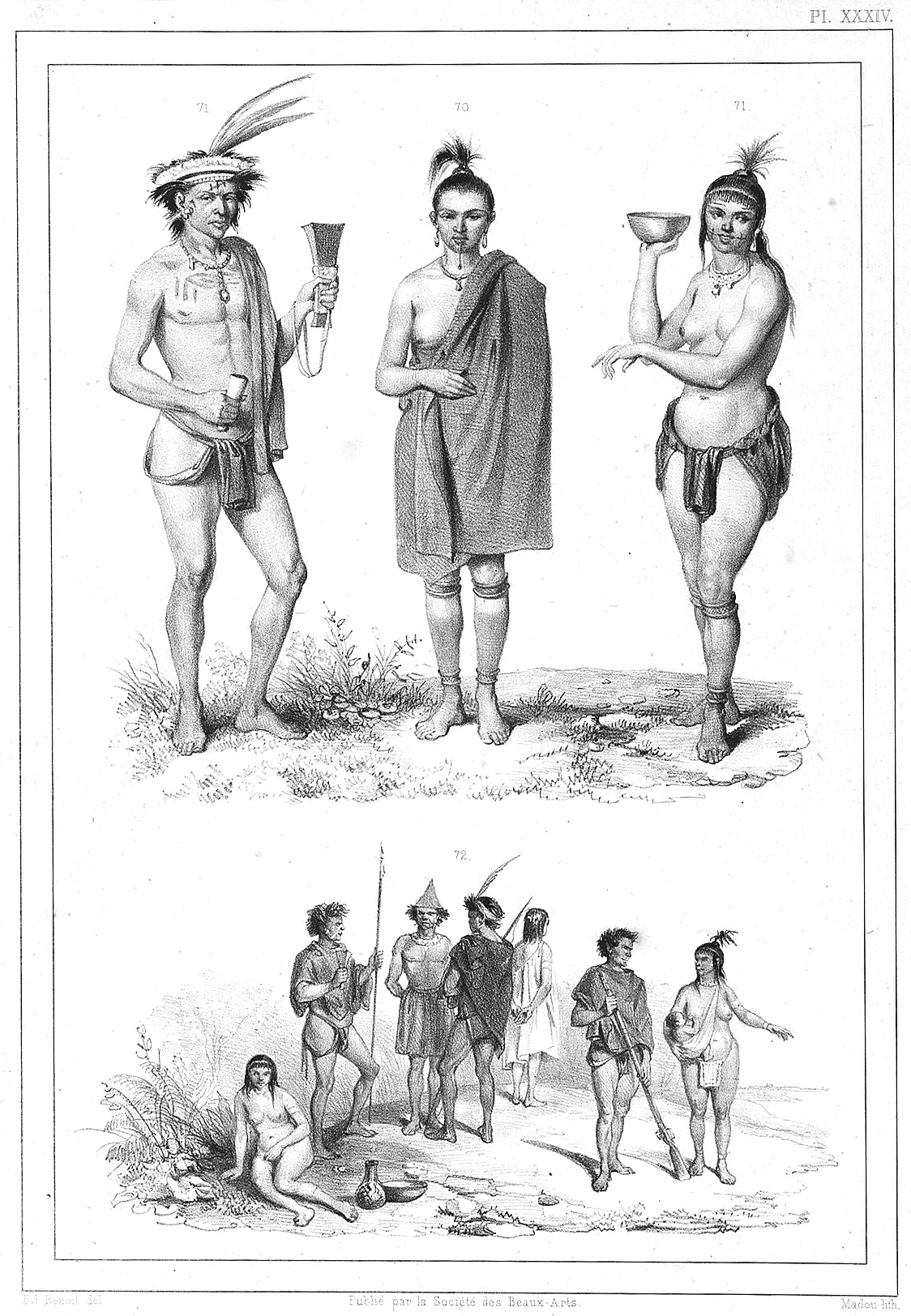
Illustration of Kalinago people (19th century)

The Carib expulsion from Martinique was the French-led ethnic cleansing that removed most of the Kalinago (Island Carib) population in 1660 from the island of Martinique. This followed the French invasion in 1635 and its conquest of the Caribbean island that made it part of the French West Indies.

== History ==
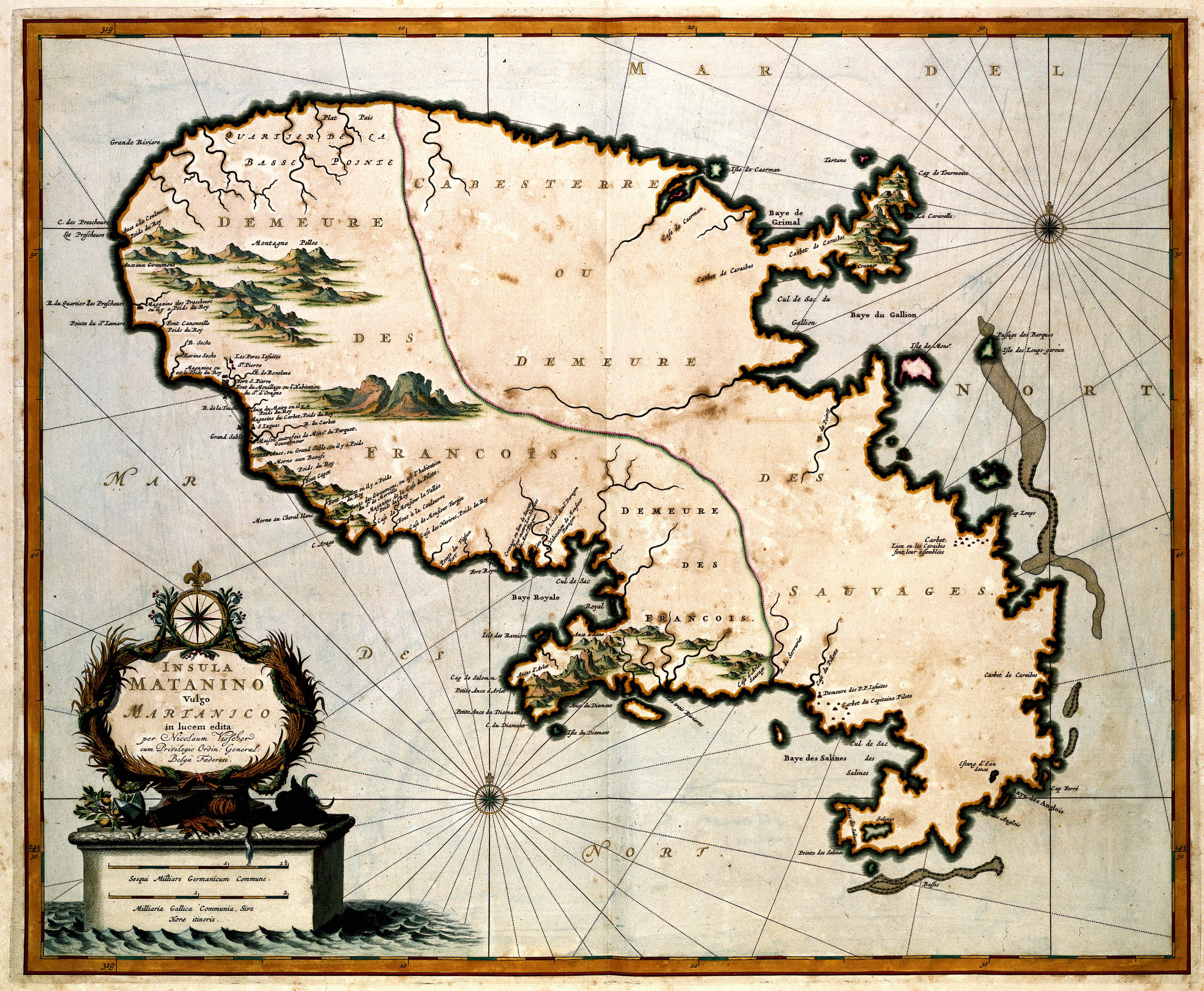
1690 map of Martinique; the western part is labelled "abode of the French" while the east is called "Cabesterre, or abode of the savages."

The Arawak were the first settlers of Martinique (which they called Madinina, "flower island"), arriving around the 1st century BC. The Kalinago people invaded the islands about AD 1200 according to carbon dating of artifacts, massacring and expelling the Arawak; they called the island Jouanacera, "iguana island."

In 1635 the Kalinago were overwhelmed by French forces led by the adventurer Pierre Belain d'Esnambuc and his nephew Jacques Dyel du Parquet, who imposed French colonial rule on the Indigenous Kalinago peoples. Cardinal Richelieu of France gave the island to the Saint Christophe Company, in which he was a shareholder. Later the company was reorganized as the Company of the American Islands. The French colonists imposed French Law on the conquered inhabitants, and Jesuit missionaries arrived to convert them to the Roman Catholic Church.

Because the Kalinago people resisted working as laborers to build and maintain the sugar and cocoa plantations which the French began to develop in the Caribbean, in 1636 King Louis XIII proclaimed La Traite des Noirs. This authorized the capture or purchase of slaves from Africa, who were then transported as labor to Martinique and other parts of the French West Indies.

In 1650, the Company liquidated and sold Martinique to Jacques Dyel du Parquet, who became governor until his death in 1658. His widow then took control of the island for France. As more French colonists arrived, they were attracted to the fertile area known as Cabesterre (leeward side). The French had pushed the remaining Kalinago people to this northeastern coast and the Caravalle Peninsula, but the colonists wanted the additional land. The Jesuits and Dominicans agreed that whichever order arrived there first, would get all future parishes in that part of the island. The Jesuits came by sea and the Dominicans by land, with the Dominicans' ultimately prevailing.

When the Kalinago revolted against French rule in 1660, the Governor Charles Houel sieur de Petit Pré retaliated with war against them. Many were killed; those who survived were taken captive and expelled from the island.

On Martinique, the French colonists signed a peace treaty with the few remaining Kalinago. Some Kalinago had fled to Dominica or St. Vincent, where the French agreed to leave them at peace. However, following the British conquest of these islands, the Kalinago would eventually be expelled to Central America after losing the Second Carib War.
