= History of Martinique =

This is a page on the history of the island of Martinique.

== 100–1450 ==
The island was originally inhabited by Arawak and Carib peoples. Circa 130 AD, the first Arawaks are believed to have arrived from South America. In 295 A.D, an eruption of Mount Pelée resulted in the decimation of the island's population. Around 400 A.D, the Arawaks returned and repopulated the island. Around 600 A.D, the Caribs arrived. They exterminated the Arawaks and proceeded to settle on the island over the next few centuries.

== 1450–1600 ==
Christopher Columbus charted the island in 1493, making the region known to European interests, but it was not until June 15, 1502, on his fourth voyage, that he actually landed, leaving several pigs and goats on the island. However, the Spaniards ignored the island as other parts of the New World were of greater interest to them.

== 17th century ==
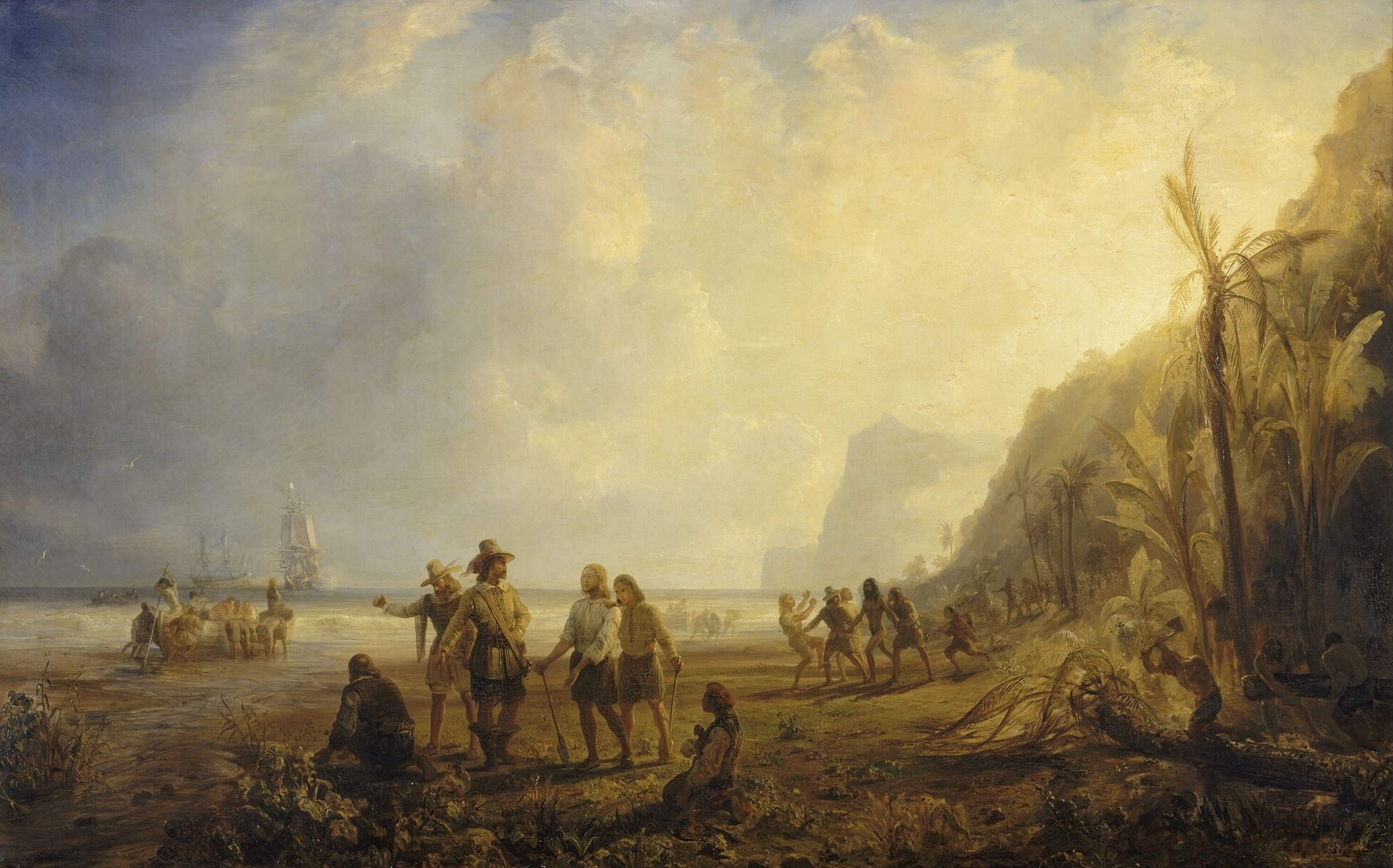
Pierre Belain d'Esnambuc landing in Martinique in 1635

In 1635, after 133 years of Spanish rule, Spain was forced to cede Martinica to the French under Cardinal Richelieu who created the Compagnie des Îles de l'Amérique (Company of the Isles of America, the successor to the Compagnie de Saint-Christophe). The company contracted with Messrs l'Olive and Duplessis to occupy and govern on its behalf the Caribbean islands belonging to the French crown. This led on September 1, 1635, to Pierre Bélain d'Esnambuc landing on Martinique with eighty to one hundred French settlers from Saint Cristophe. They met some resistance that they were able to dispatch quickly because of their far superior weaponry and armor. They settled in the northwestern region that later became known as St. Pierre at the mouth of the Roxelane River, where they built Fort Saint Pierre. The first governor was Jean Dupont.

The following year, d'Esnambuc fell ill and passed the command of the settlement to his nephew, Jacques Dyel du Parquet. At this time the colony's population numbered some 700 men. The settlers cleared the land around St. Pierre to grow crops. They grew manioc and potatoes to live on and rocou, indigo, tobacco, and later cacao and cotton, for export. French and foreign merchants frequently came to the island to buy these exotic products, transforming Martinique into a modestly prosperous colony. The colonists also established another fort, Fort Saint Louis in 1638. This fort, like Fort Saint Pierre, was little more than a wooden stockade. In 1640, the fort was improved to include a ditch, high stone walls and 26 cannons.

Over the next quarter of a century the French established full control of the island. They systematically killed the fiercely resisting Caribs as they expanded, forcing the survivors back to the Caravelle Peninsula in the Cabesterre (the eastern side of the island).

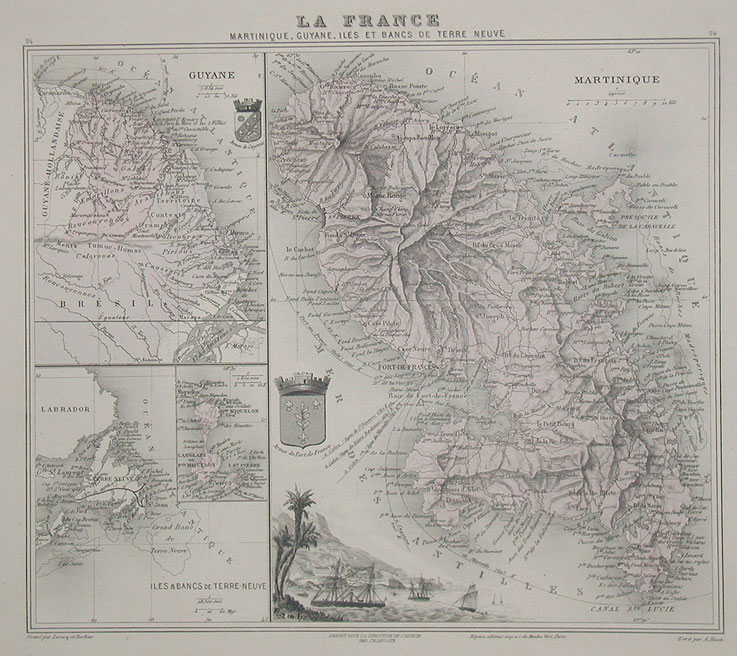
1865 map featuring Martinique

Although labor-intensive, sugar was a lucrative product to trade, and cultivation on Martinique soon focused only on growing and trading sugar. In 1685, King Louis XIV proclaimed "Le Code Noir", which aimed to provide a legal framework for the removal of Africans from their homeland and their transport to work as slaves on the French sugar plantations. Ever since, a strong theme of Martinican culture has been creolization or interaction between the French colonial settlers, known locally as békés, and the Africans they imported. For over two hundred years, slavery, and slave revolts, would be a major influence on the economy and politics of the island.

The French colonial settlers were peasants attracted by propaganda promising fortune and a life under the sun. The "volunteers" were indentured servants who had to work for their master for three years, after which they were promised their own land. However, the tiring work and hot climate resulted in few of the workers surviving their three years, with the result that constant immigration was necessary for maintaining the workforce. Still, under the directorship of du Parquet, Martinique's economy developed as it exported products to France and the neighboring English and Dutch colonies. In 1645, the Sovereign council was established with several powers, among them the right to grant titles of nobility to families in the islands. In 1648, the Company of the Isles of America started to wind up its affairs and in 1650 du Parquet bought the island.

In 1650 Father Jacques du Tetre built a still for converting the waste from the sugarcane mills into molasses, which became a major export industry.

In 1654, du Parquet allowed 250 Dutch Jews, who were fleeing Brazil following the Portuguese taking back their territory in that colony, to settle Martinique, where they engaged in the sugar trade. This was by far the most sought after product in Europe and the crop soon became Martinique's biggest export.

After the death of du Parquet, his widow ruled on behalf of his children until 1658, when Louis XIV resumed sovereignty over the island, paying an indemnity of £120,000 to the du Parquet children. At this time, Martinique's population numbered some 5,000 settlers and a few surviving Carib Indians. The Caribs were eventually exterminated or exiled in 1660.

In 1658, Dominican Fathers built an estate at Fonds Saint-Jacques. From 1693 to 1705, this was the home of Père Labat, the French Dominican priest who improved the distillery. A colorful character, he was also an explorer, architect, engineer, and historian, and fought as a soldier against the English.

In 1664, Louis transferred the island, this time to the newly established Compagnie des Indes Occidentales. The next year, during the Second Anglo-Dutch War, a Dutch fleet under Admiral Michiel de Ruyter retired to Martinique to refit after the fleet's indecisive encounter with an English force off Barbados. Two years later a hurricane devastated Martinique and Guadelope, killing some 2,000 people. This was the first of several natural disasters that would devastate the population of Martinique over the next few centuries.

The French buccaneer François l'Ollonais (Jean-David Nau) spent part of his early life as a servant on Martinique before joining the buccaneers based in Saint-Domingue (present-day Haiti). Martinique is a home port to for French buccaneers as well as pirates like Captain Crapeau, Étienne de Montauban and Mathurin Desmarestz which earned a notorious reputation for their violent tactics against Spanish captives, often referred to as "Fléau des Espagnols" (Flail of the Spanish). It allowed the French to operate in the Caribbean against Spanish ships in both Hispaniola and Martinique.

In 1666 and 1667 the English unsuccessfully attacked. The Treaty of Breda (1667) ended the Second Anglo-Dutch War and hence the hostilities.

In 1672, Louis XIV ordered the construction of a citadel, Fort Saint Louis, at Fort Royal Bay to defend Martinique. The next year, the Compagnie des Indes Occidentales decided to establish a town at Fort Royal, even though the location was a malarial swamp. The Compagnie des Indes Occidentales failed in 1674, and the colony reverted to the direct administration of the French crown. Martinique's administration was in the hands of council. The King appointed two members: the Lieutenant-general and the administrator. They chose the other council members (the governor, the Attorney General and the ordinary judge). This organization lasted until 1685.

During the Third Anglo-Dutch War, de Ruyter returned to Martinique in 1674, this time with the intent to capture Fort Royal. Calm winds and French booms prevented him from sailing his fleet of 30 warships, nine supply ships, and 15 transports into the harbor. The French repulsed his attempt to land his 3,400 troops, causing him to lose 143 men, at a cost of 15 French lives.

In 1675 the first Governor General of the West Indies, Jean-Charles de Baas-Castelmore, arrived in Martinique and served until 1677. His successor was Charles de La Roche-Courbon, comte de Blénac, who served for the first time from 1677 to 1683. He drew up a plan for the city of Fort Royal and improving the fortifications of Fort Saint Louis. de Blénac was responsible for the 10-year effort that resulted in the building of a 487-meter wall around the peninsula on which the Fort stood, the wall being four meters high and two meters thick, and cutting a ditch that separated from the town. de Blénac served as Governor General again from June 1684 to February 1691, and again from 24 Nov 1691 until his death in 1696.

The growth of the town resulted in the progressive clearing and draining of the mangrove swamp. By 1681, Fort-Royal was the administrative, military and political capital of Martinique. Still, Saint Pierre, with its better harbor, remained the commercial capital.

In 1685, in France King Louis XIV promulgated the "Code Noir" (literally, Black Code), a collection of law texts whose 60 articles would regulate slavery in the colonies, and which was partially inspired by Jean-Baptiste Colbert. The code forbade some cruel acts, but institutionalized others and slavery itself, relegating the status of slaves to that of chattel. It also ordered the expulsion of the Jews from all the French islands. These Jews then moved to the Dutch island of Curaçao, where they prospered.

In 1692, Charles de La Roche-Courbon, Count of Blénac, the Governor and Lieutenant General of the French colonies in America, named Fort Royal as the capital city of Martinique. In 1693 the English again unsuccessfully attacked Martinique.

== 1700–1788 ==
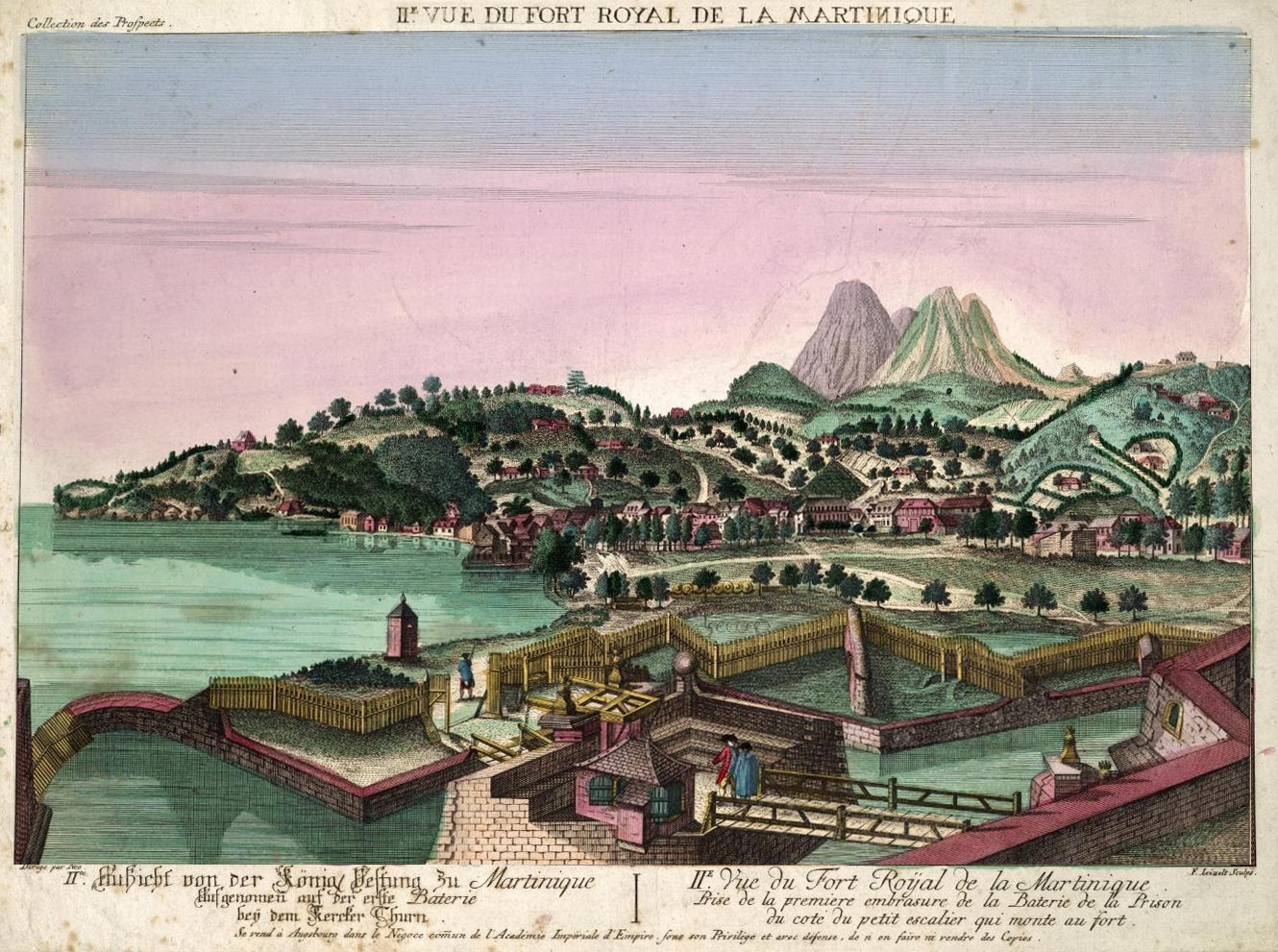
Port Royal in the 1750s

In 1720, a French naval officer, Gabriel de Clieu, procured a coffee plant seedling from the Royal Botanical Gardens in Paris and transported it to Martinique. He transplanted it on the slopes of Mount Pelée and was able to harvest his first crop in 1726, or shortly thereafter. By 1736, the number of slaves in Martinique had risen to 60,000 people. In 1750, Saint Pierre had about 15,000 inhabitants, and Fort Royal only about 4,000.

During the Seven Years' War the British 76th Regiment of Foot under William Rufane captured Martinique in early 1762. Following Britain's victory in the war there was a strong possibility the island would be annexed by them. However, the sugar trade made the island so valuable to the royal French government that at the Treaty of Paris (1763), which ended the Seven Years' War, they declined to regain Canada in order to regain Martinique and the neighboring island of Guadeloupe. During the British occupation, Marie Josèph Rose Tascher de la Pagerie, the future Empress Joséphine was born to a noble family living on Les Trois-Îlets across the bay from Fort Royal. Also, 1762 saw a yellow fever epidemic and in 1763 the French established separate governments for Martinique and Guadeloupe.

August 2, 1766 saw the birth of Saint-Pierre de Louis Delgrès, a mixed-race free black who would serve in the French army and fight the British in 1794, before becoming the leader of the unsuccessful resistance in Guadeloupe against General Richepance, whom Napoleon had sent to restore slavery to that colony. On August 13 (in either 1766 or 1767) a hurricane – apparently accompanied by an earthquake – struck the island; 600–1600 were killed. Monsieur de la Pagerie, the father of the future Empress, was almost ruined. At the time, there were some 450 sugar mills in Martinique, and molasses was a major export. Four years later an earthquake shook the island. By 1774, when a decree ended indentured servitude for whites, there were some 18 to 19 million coffee trees on the island.

In 1779, the future Joséphine de Beauharnais, first Empress of the French, sailed for France to meet her husband for the first time. In the following year the Great Hurricane of 1780, one of the most damaging hurricanes in Western history, struck the island, killing 9000. Over 100 French and Dutch merchantmen were lost. In 1782, Admiral de Grasse sailed from Martinique to rendezvous with Spanish forces in order to attack Jamaica. The subsequent battle of the Saintes resulted in a massive defeat for the French at the hands of the Royal Navy.

== French Revolution ==
Martinique during the British attack in 1794

The French Revolution (1789) also affected Trinidad when Martiniquan planters and their slaves emigrated there and started to grow sugar and cocoa. Médéric Louis Élie Moreau de Saint-Méry, the deputy to the National Constituent Assembly for Martinique opposed representation for Free people of color.

On 4 April 1792, the French Legislative Assembly extended citizenship to all men of color. Donatien-Marie-Joseph de Vimeur, vicomte de Rochambeau was sent to Martinique to apply this law. The Constituent Assembly of Martinique agreed to promulgate this law. However they refused to allow Rochambeau to disembark with his troops. In 1793 there was a small, unsuccessful slave rebellion in Saint Pierre. The French executed six of the ringleaders. On 4 February 1793, Louis-Francois Dubuc signed the Whitehall Accord, putting Martinique under British jurisdiction until the French monarchy was reestablished. In doing so he forestalled the spread of the French Revolution to Martinique, preventing the Republican regime in France from acquiring control over the colony. Notably, the accord guaranteed all French colonists in Martinique the right to continue owning slaves.

In 1794 the National Convention issued a decree abolished slavery. However, before the decree could be transmitted to Martinique and implemented, the British invaded the island and occupied it. A British force under Admiral Sir John Jervis and Lieutenant-General Sir Charles Grey captured Fort Royal and Fort Saint Louis on 22 March and Fort Bourbon two days later. At that point all French resistance ceased. On 30 March 1794, the British occupational authorities reinstated the ancien regime, including the French Monarchy's Supreme Council and the seneschal's courts of Trinité, Le Marin, and St Pierre. French Royalists regained possession of their properties and positions, including their slaves, and emancipation was forbidden by the Royalist authorities, who also promulgated an ordinance banning all gatherings of blacks or meetings by slaves, and forbade Carnival.

== Napoleonic Wars ==
Six years later, in 1800, Jean Kina, an ex-slave from Saint Domingue and aide-de-camp to a British officer, fled to Morne Lemaître and called on free blacks and slaves to join him in a rebellion in support of the rights of the free blacks against the Royalist government. When Kina's small force marched on Fort-Royal, British troops quickly responded and negotiated his surrender in return for amnesty. The British transported Kina to England, where they held him in Newgate Prison.

In 1802, the British returned the island to the French under the Treaty of Amiens. Napoléon Bonaparte reinstated slavery in the French colonies, though in Martinique it had never been abolished in practice, due to the British occupation. In 1796, he had married Martiniquan Joséphine de Beauharnais and in 1804 she became Empress of France.

During the Napoleonic Wars, in 1804 the British established a fort at Diamond Rock, outside Fort de France, and garrisoned it with some 120 sailors and five cannons. The Royal Navy commissioned the fort HMS Diamond Rock and from there were able for 17 months to harass vessels coming into the port. The French eventually sent a fleet of sixteen vessels that retook the island after a fierce bombardment.

The British again captured Martinique in 1809, and held it until 1814. In 1813, a hurricane killed 3,000 people in Martinique. During Napoleon's Hundred Days in 1815, he abolished the slave trade. At the same time the British briefly re-occupied Martinique. The British, who had abolished the slave trade in their empire in 1807, forced Napoleon's successor, Louis XVIII to retain the proscription, though it did not become truly effective until 1831.

== 1815–1899 ==
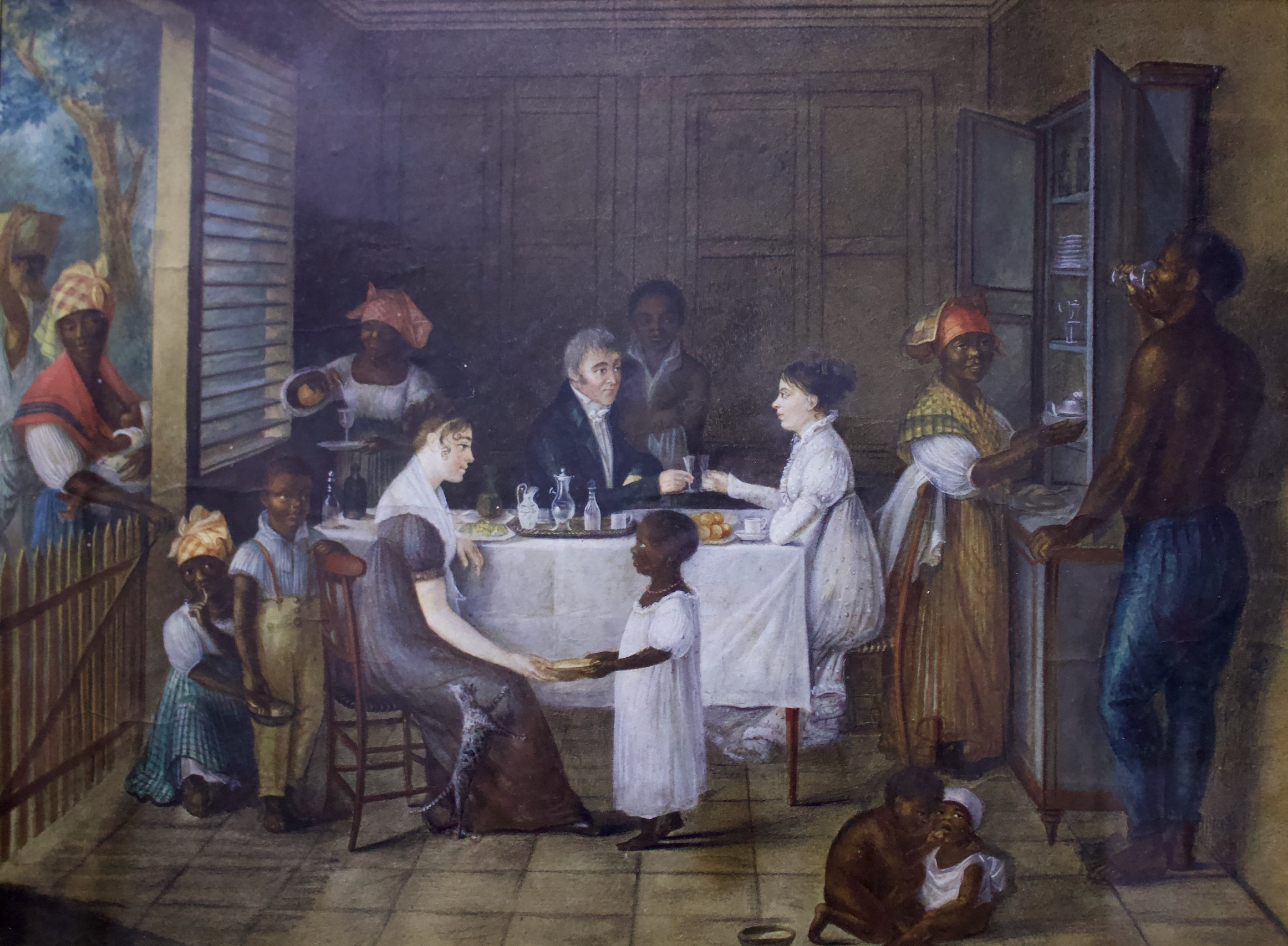
Group portrait of Charlotte Martner, her husband, the house staff (black slaves) and a guest, in a dining room in Fort-de-France, Martinique, between 1803 and 1821

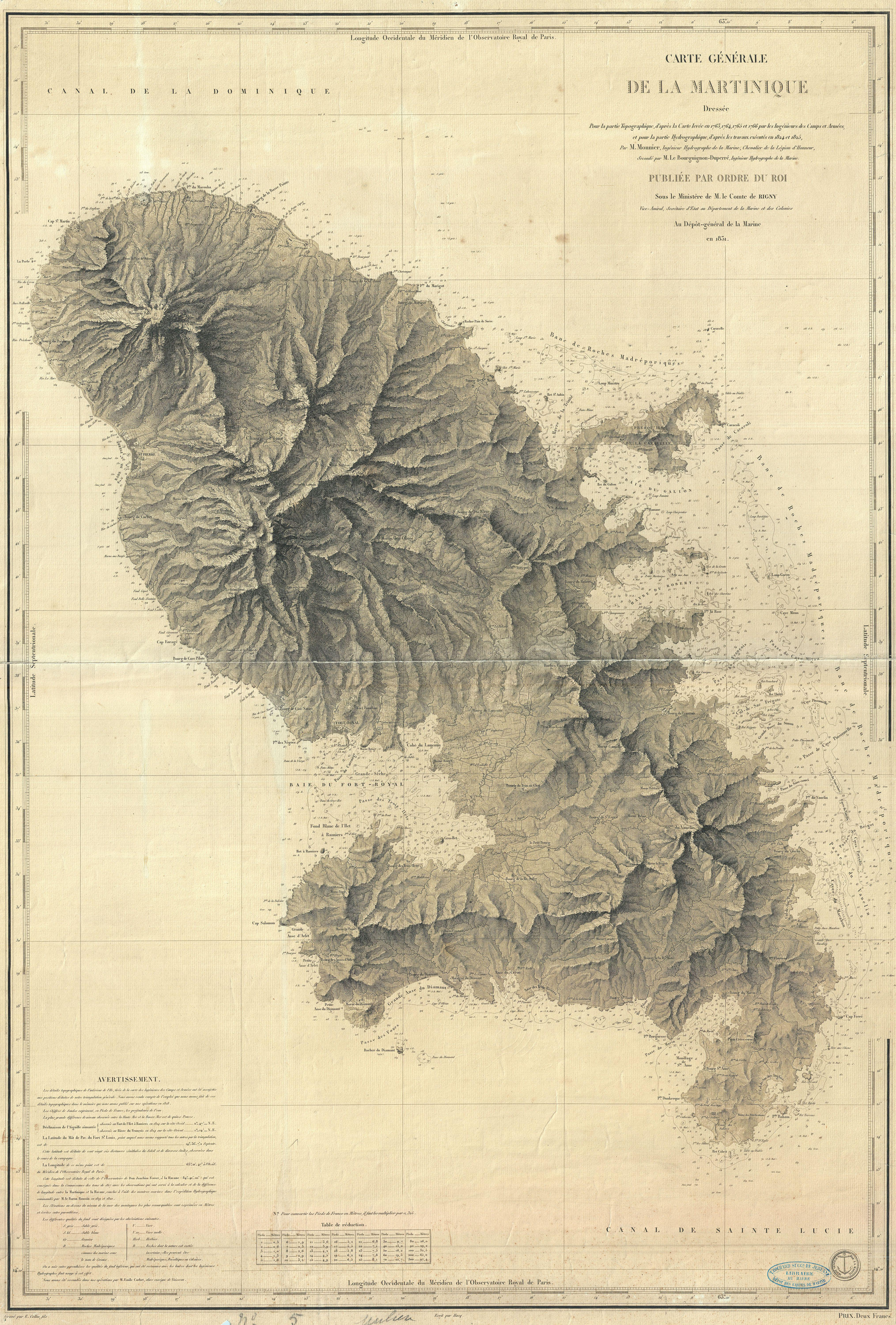
An 1851 map of Martinique

A slave insurrection in 1822 resulted in two dead and seven injured. The government condemned 19 slaves to death, 10 to the galleys, six to whipping, and eight to helping with the executions.

Martinique has suffered from earthquakes as well as hurricanes. In 1839, an earthquake believed to have measured 6.5 on the Richter magnitude scale killed some 400 to 700 people, caused severe damage in Saint Pierre, and almost totally destroyed Fort Royal. Fort Royal was rebuilt in wood, reducing the risk from earthquakes, but increasing the risk from fire. That same year, there were 495 sugar producers in Martinique, who produced some 25,900 tons of "white gold".

In February 1848, François Auguste Perrinon became head of the Committee of Colonists of Martinique. He was a member of the Commission for the abolition of slavery, led by Victor Schœlcher. On April 27, Schœlcher obtained a decree abolishing slavery in the French Empire. Perrinon was appointed Commissioner General of Martinique, and charged with the task of abolishing slavery there. However, he and the decree did not arrive in Martinique until June 3, by which time Governor Claude Rostoland had already abolished slavery. The imprisonment of a slave at Le Prêcheur had led to a slave revolt on May 20; two days later Rostoland, under duress, had abolished slavery on the island to quell the revolt. That same year, following the establishment of the Second Republic, Fort Royal became Fort-de-France. In 1981, May 22 was declared a national holiday in celebration of emancipation.

In 1851 a law was passed authorizing the creation of two colonial banks with the authority to issue banknotes. This led to the founding of the Bank of Martinique in Saint Pierre, and the Bank of Guadeloupe. (These banks would merge in 1967 to form the present-day Banque des Antilles Française).

Indentured laborers from India started to arrive in Martinique in 1853. Plantation owners recruited the Indians to replace the slaves, who once free, had fled the plantations. This led to the creation of the small but continuing Indian community in Martinique. This immigration repeated on a smaller scale the importation of Indians to such British colonies as British Guiana and Trinidad and Tobago following the abolition of slavery in the British Empire in 1833. Towards the end of the century, 1000 Chinese also came as earlier they had come to Cuba.

The city government in 1857-58 cleared and filled the flood channel encircling Fort de France. The channel had become an open sewer and hence a health hazard. The filled-in channel, La Levee, marked the northern boundary of the city.

Martinique got its second enduring financial institution in 1863 when the Crédit Foncier Colonial opened its doors in Saint Pierre. Its objective was to make long-term loans for the construction or modernization of sugar factories. It replaced the Crédit Colonial, which had been established in 1860, but seems hardly to have gotten going.

In 1868 construction work on the Radoub Basin port facilities at Fort de France finally was completed. The improvements to the port would enable Fort de France better to compete in trade and commerce with Saint Pierre.

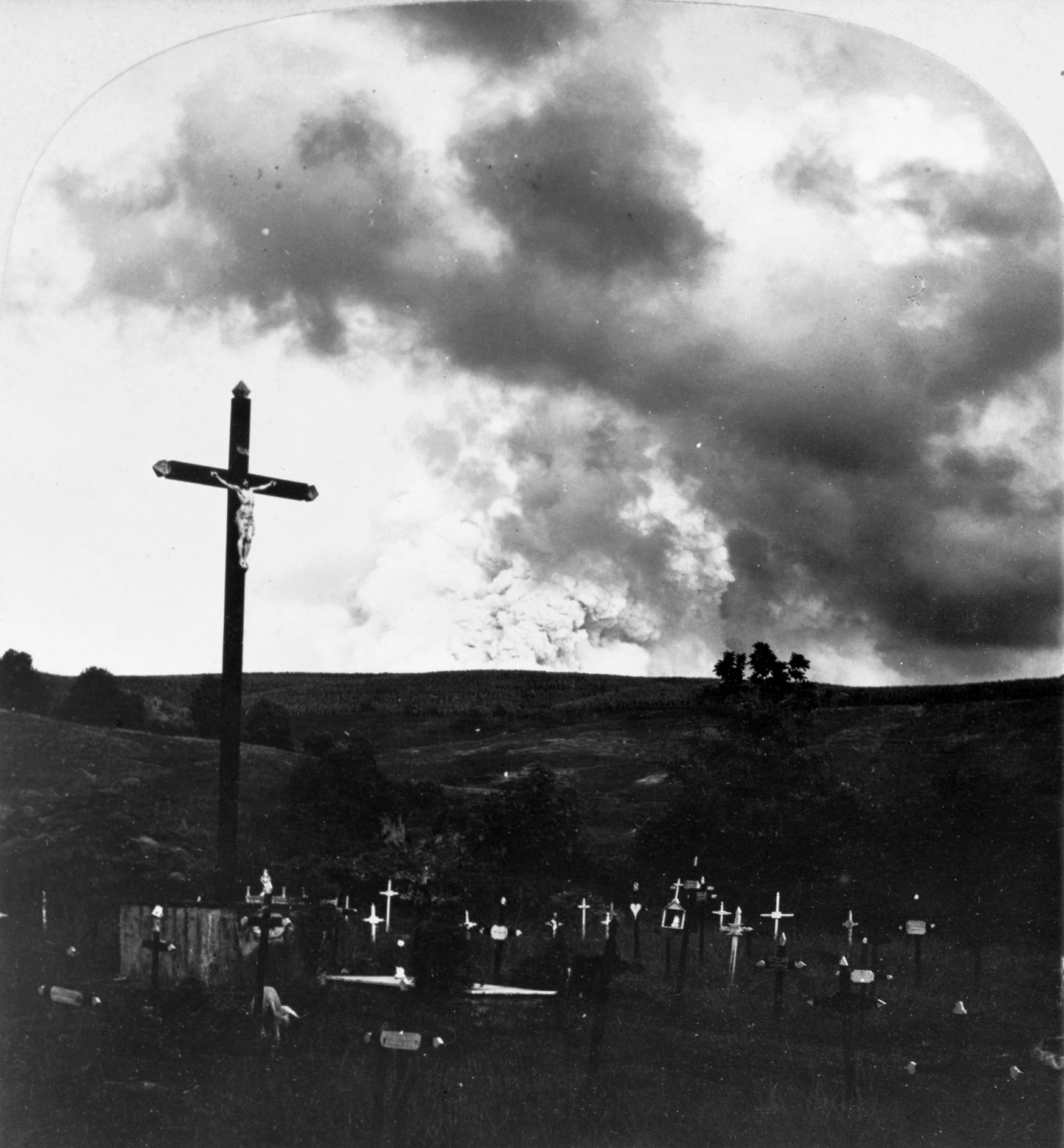
Eruption of Mount Pelée, Martinique, in 1902, with graveyard in foreground

In 1870, during the Franco-Prussian War, rising racial tensions led to the short-lived insurrection in southern Martinique and proclamation in Fort-de-France of a Martiniquan Republic. The insurrection started with an altercation between a local béké (white) and a black tradesman. A crowd lynched the béke and during the insurrection many sugar factories were torched. The authorities restored order by temporarily imprisoning some 500 rebels in Martinique's forts. Seventy-four were tried and found guilty, and the twelve principal leaders were shot to death. The authorities deported the rest to French Guiana or New Caledonia.

By this time sugar cane fields covered some 57% of Martinique's arable land. Unfortunately, falling prices for sugar forced many small sugar works to merge. Producers turned to rum production in an attempt to improve their fortunes.

When France established the Third Republic in 1871, the colonies, Martinique among them, gained representation in the National Assembly.

In 1887, after visiting Panama, Paul Gauguin spent some months with his friend Charles Laval, also a painter, in a cabin some two kilometers south of Saint Pierre. During this period Gauguin produced several paintings featuring Martinique. There is now a small Gauguin museum in Le Carbet that has reproductions of his Martinique paintings. That same year Harper's Weekly sent the author and translator Lafcadio Hearn to Martinique for a short visit; he ended up staying for some two years. After his return to the United States he would publish two books, one an account of his daily life in Martinique and the other the story of a slave.

By 1888, the population of Martinique had risen from about 163,000 people a decade earlier to 176,000. At the same time, natural disasters continued to plague the island. Much of Fort de France was devastated by a fire in 1890, and then the next year a hurricane killed some 400 people.

In the 1880s, the Paris architect Pierre-Henri Picq built the Schœlcher Library, an iron and glass structure that was exhibited in the Tuileries Gardens during the 1889 Paris Exposition Universelle, on the occasion of the 100th anniversary of the French Revolution. After the Exposition the building was shipped to Fort de France and reassembled there, the work being completed by 1893. Initially, the library contained the 10,000 books that Victor Schœlcher had donated to the island. Today it houses over 250,000 and stands as a tribute to the man who led the movement to abolish slavery in Martinique. In 1895, Picq also built the Saint-Louis Cathedral in Fort-de-France.

== 20th century ==
The abolition of slavery did not end racially charged labor strife. In 1900, a strike at a sugar factory owned by a Frenchman led to the police shooting dead 10 agricultural workers.

=== Mount Pelée eruption ===
On May 8, 1902, a blast from the volcano Mont Pelée destroyed the town of St. Pierre, killing almost all of its 29,000 inhabitants. The only survivors were a shoemaker and a prisoner who was saved by his position in a jail dungeon with only a single window. Because Saint Pierre was the commercial capital of the island, there were four banks in the city—the Banque de la Martinique, Banque Transatlantique, a branch of the Colonial Bank of London, and the Crédit Foncier Colonial. All were destroyed. The town had to be completely rebuilt and lost its status as the commercial capital, a title which shifted to Fort-de-France. Due to the eruption, refugees from Martinique arrived in boats to the southern villages of Dominica and some remained permanently on the island.

=== Return to normality ===
A hurricane in 1903 killed 31 people and damaged the sugar crop and a strong earthquake off Saint Lucia in 1906 caused further damage in Martinique, but mercifully no deaths. As construction began on the Panama Canal, more than 5,000 Martiniquans left to work on the project.

Resettlement of Saint Pierre began in 1908. Even so, two years later the City of Saint Pierre was removed from the map of France with jurisdiction over the ruins transferring to Le Carbet. Elsewhere, political opponents assassinated the mayor of Fort de France, Antoine Seger in 1908.

With war with Germany looming, in 1913 France enacted compulsory military service in the colony, and called on Martinique to send 1,100 men per year to France for training. When World War I finally came, 18,000 Martiniquans took part, of whom 1,306 died. During the war, the French government requisitioned Martinique's rum production for the use of the French Army. Production doubled as sugar mills converted to distilleries, helping the recovery of the local economy.

=== Between the World Wars ===
In 1923 Saint Pierre was reestablished as a municipality. Two years later, in Fort de France, the municipal council approved the Mayor's proposal to redevelop the slum district of Terres Sainvilles as a "workers city". The council would sell the new housing to the residents for 40 semi-annual interest-free payments.

With the collapse of the world market for sugar in 1921–22, cultivators sought a new crop. In 1928 they introduced bananas.

Mont Pelée became active in 1929, forcing the temporary evacuation of Saint Pierre. The Volcanological Observatory there did not get its first seismometer until some three years later.

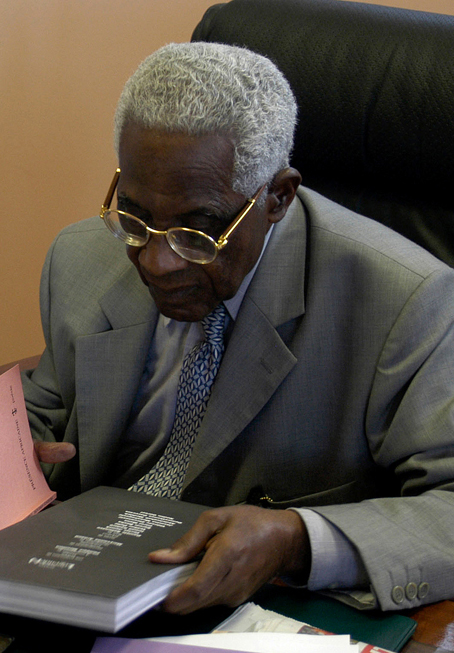
Aimé Césaire

In 1931, the Martiniquan Aimé Césaire moved to Paris to attend the Lycée Louis-le-Grand, the École Normale Supérieure, and finally the Sorbonne. While in Paris, Césaire met Léopold Senghor, then a poet but later Senegal's first President. Césaire, his wife Suzanne Césaire, Senghor, and Léon Damas, with whom Césaire had gone to school in Martinique at the Lycée Schœlcher, together formulated the concept of négritude, defined as an affirmation of pride in being black, and promoted it as a movement.

In 1933, André Aliker, the editor of Justice, the Communist newspaper, documented that a M. Aubéry, the wealthy, white owner of the Lareinty Company, had bribed the judges of the Court of Appeal to dismiss charges of tax fraud against him. That same year, Félix Eboué became the Acting Governor of the island, and an American, Frank Perret, established Le Musée Volcanologique at Saint Pierre.

In 1934, persons unknown kidnapped and murdered André Aliker; his body washed up on the beach with his arms tied behind him. Aimé Césaire, Senghor, Damas, and others, founded L'Etudiant, a Black student review.

In 1939, the French cruiser Jeanne d'Arc arrived late in the year with Admiral Georges Robert, High Commissioner of the Republic to the Antilles and Guiana. Aimé Césaire returned to Martinique. He became a teacher at the Lycée Schœlcher in Fort de France, where his students included Frantz Fanon and Édouard Glissant.

=== World War II ===
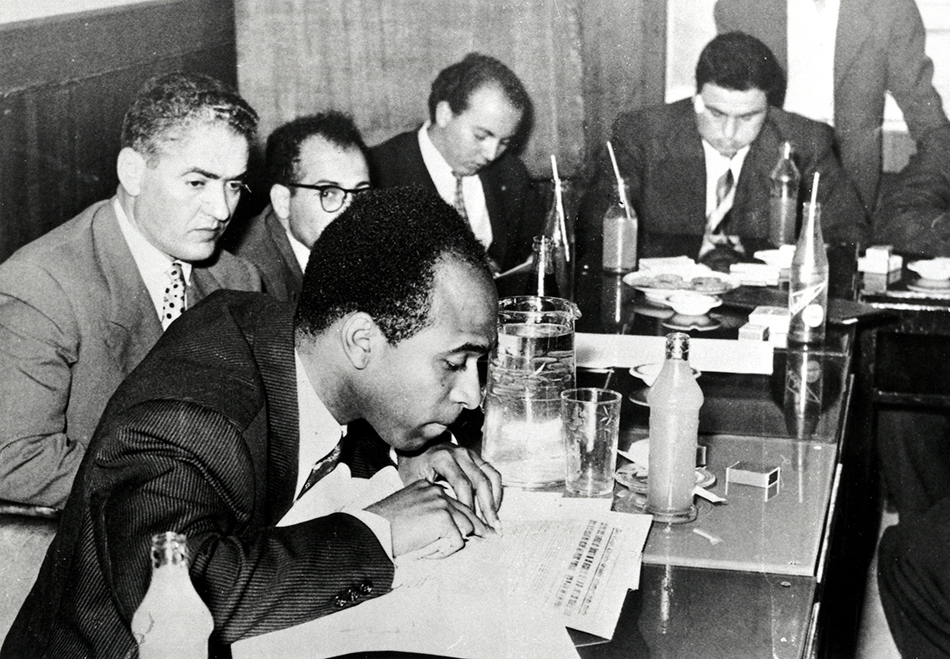
Frantz-Fanon

Until mid-1943, Martinique was officially pro-Vichy, with the US and Great Britain seeking to limit any effect of that stance on the war. The US did prepare plans for an invasion by an expeditionary force to capture the island, and at various times the US and Britain established blockades. For instance, from July to November 1940, the British cruisers HMS Fiji and HMS Dunedin maintained a watch to ensure that the French aircraft carrier Béarn and the other French naval vessels in Martinique did not slip away to Europe.

In June 1940, the French cruiser Émile Bertin arrived in Martinique with 286 tons of gold from the Bank of France. The original intent was that Bank's gold reserve go to Canada for safekeeping, and a first shipment did go there. When France signed an armistice with Germany, plans changed and the second shipment was rerouted to Martinique. When it arrived in Martinique, Admiral Robert arranged for the storage of the gold in Fort Desaix. The island was blockaded by the Royal Navy and the British used the gold as collateral for Lend-Lease facilities from the US, on the basis it could be "acquired" at any time if needed.

In late 1941, Admiral Robert agreed to keep the French naval vessels, including the Émile Bertin immobilized, in return for the Allies not bombarding and invading the French Antilles. In mid-1943, Admiral Robert returned to France via Puerto Rico and Lisbon, and Free French sympathizers took control of the gold at Fort Desaix and the French fleet.

In 1944, the American film director Howard Hawks directed Humphrey Bogart, Lauren Bacall, Hoagy Carmichael and Walter Brennan in the film To Have and Have Not. Hawks more-or-less based the film on a novel that Ernest Hemingway had written in 1937. The essence of the plot is the conversion from neutrality to the Free French side of an American fishing boat captain operating out of Vichy-controlled Fort de France in 1940.

In 1945, Aimé Césaire succeeded in getting elected Mayor of Fort de France and Deputy from Martinique to the French National Assembly as a member of the Communist Party. Césaire remained mayor for 56 years. However, the Communist suppression of the Hungarian Revolution of 1956 disillusioned him, causing him to quit the Communist Party. As a member of the Assembly, he was one of the principal drafters of the 1946 law on departmentalizing former colonies, a role for which politicians favoring independence have often criticized him.

In 1947 the High Court of Justice in Versailles tried Admiral Robert for collaboration. He received a sentence of 10 years at hard labor and national degradation for life. The Court released him from the hard labor after six months, and he received a pardon in 1957.

=== Departmental era ===
In 1946, the French National Assembly voted unanimously to transform Martinique from a colony of France into a department, known in French as a Département d'outre-mer or DOM. Along with its fellow DOMs of Guadeloupe, Réunion, and French Guiana, Martinique was intended to be legally identical to any department in the metropole. However, in reality, several key differences remained, particularly within social security payments and unemployment benefits.

Some think that French funding to the DOM has somewhat made up for the social and economic devastation of the slave trade and sugar crop monoculture. With French funding to Martinique, the island had one of the highest standards of living in the Caribbean. However, it remained, somewhat constrained, dependent upon French aid, as when measured by what Martinique actually produced, it was one of the poorer islands. Martinique being one of the poorer islands is due to everything costing on average 12.3% more than in France while salaries being on average lower. Many inequalities and political issues are also at cause.

== Sources and references ==
- Burton, Richard D.E. (1978). Assimilation or Independence? Prospects for Martinique. Centre for Developing-Area Studies. McGill University. ISBN 0-88819-039-5.
- Burton, Richard D.E. and Fred Reno (1995). French and West Indian: Martinique, Guadeloupe, and French Guiana Today. New World Studies. University Press of Virginia. ISBN 0-8139-1565-1.
- Wilgus, A. Curtis (1958). The Caribbean: British, Dutch, French, United States. University of Florida Press. ISBN 0-8139-1565-1.
