= French West Indies =

French territories in the Caribbean

French West Indies Antilles françaises
- 1628–1946
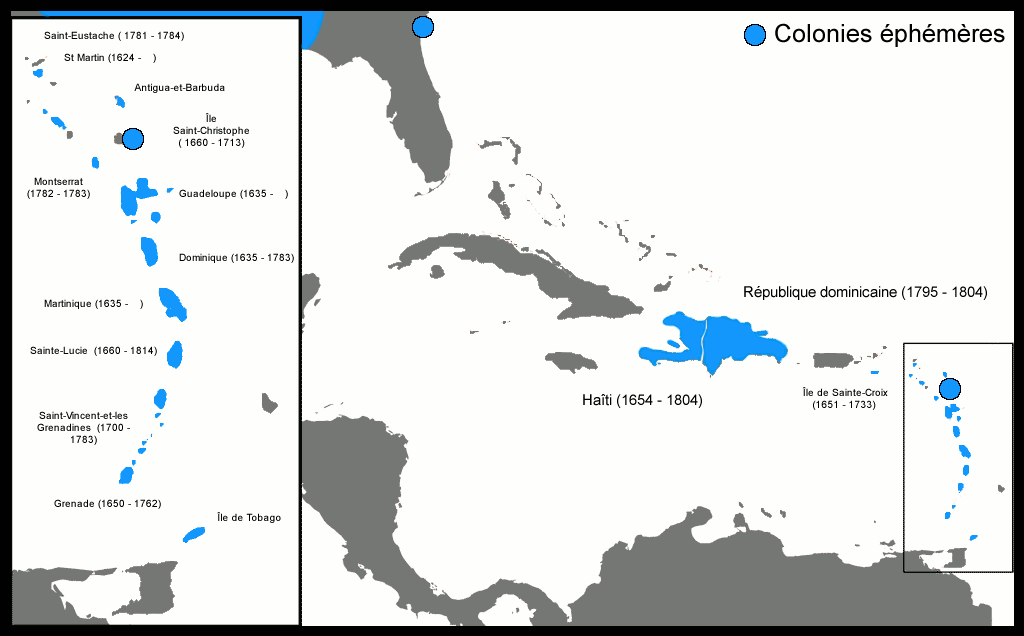
- Location of the modern territories of the French West Indies
- Status: Colony of France (1628–1946); Overseas departments and overseas collectivities (1946–present)
- Capital: Basse-Terre (1628–1671); Saint-Pierre (1671–1674); Fort-Royal (1674–1851); 14°41′N 61°02′W
- Common languages: French; Creole
- Governor-General
  - 1628–1636: Pierre Belain d'Esnambuc
  - 1849–1851: Armand Joseph Bruat
- History
  - Company of the American Islands takes possession of Dominica (1632), formerly as Compagnie de Saint-Christophe Guadeloupe (28 June 1635 to 1649) Martinique (15 September 1635 to 27 Sep 1650) St. Lucia (1643 to 27 Sep 1650) St. Martin (23 March 1648) St. Barts (1648) Grenada (17 March 1649 to 27 Sep 1650) St. Croix (1650): 1628
  - Foundation of the colony of Saint-Christophe (French colony): 1625
  - Peace of Ryswick: 1697
  - Treaty of Paris: 1763
  - Massacres in Haiti: 1804
  - Departmentalization law: 1946
  - Disestablished: 1946
Preceded by
Spanish West Indies
Succeeded by
First Empire of Haiti (1804)
Overseas departments of France
Overseas collectivities of France

The French West Indies or French Antilles (French: Antilles françaises, [ɑ̃tij fʁɑ̃sɛːz]; Antillean Creole: Antiy fwansé) were the parts of France located in the Antilles islands of the Caribbean:

- The two overseas departments of:
  - Guadeloupe, including the islands of Basse-Terre, Grande-Terre, Les Saintes, Marie-Galante, and La Désirade.
  - Martinique
- The two overseas collectivities of:
  - Saint Martin, the northern half of the island with the same name, the southern half is Sint Maarten, a constituent country of the Kingdom of the Netherlands.
  - Saint Barthélemy

== History ==
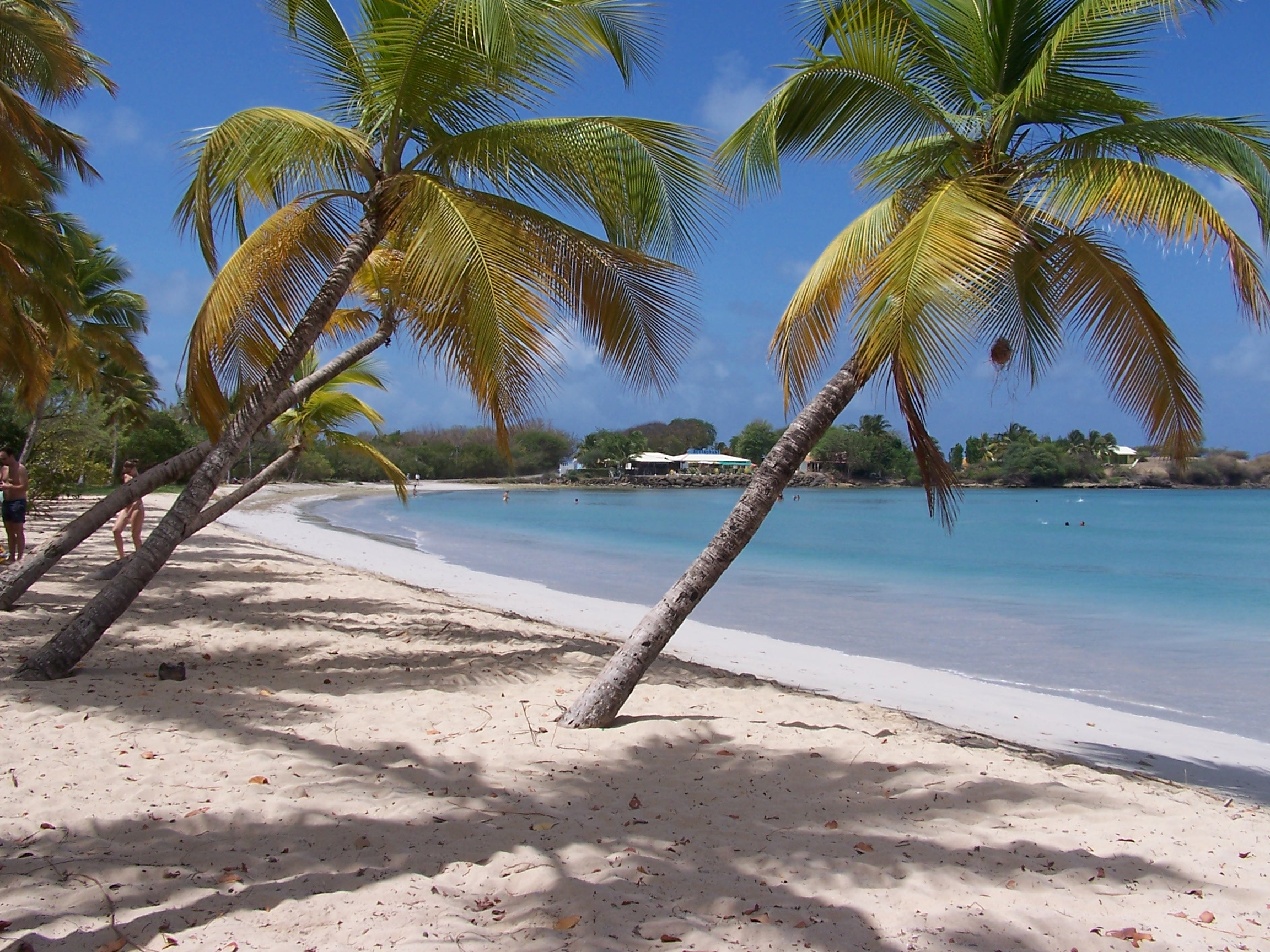
Les Salines in Martinique, France

Pierre Belain d'Esnambuc was a French trader and adventurer in the Caribbean, who established the first permanent French colony, Saint-Pierre, on the island of Martinique in 1635. Belain sailed to the Caribbean in 1625, hoping to establish a French settlement on the island of St. Christopher (St. Kitts). In 1626 he returned to France, where he won the support of Cardinal Richelieu to establish French colonies in the region. Richelieu became a shareholder in the Compagnie de Saint-Christophe, created to accomplish this with d'Esnambuc at its head. The company was not particularly successful and Richelieu had it reorganized as the Compagnie des Îles de l'Amérique. In 1635 d'Esnambuc sailed to Martinique with one hundred French settlers to clear land for sugarcane plantations.

After six months on Martinique, d'Esnambuc returned to St. Christopher, where he soon died prematurely in 1636. His nephew, Jacques Dyel du Parquet, inherited d'Esnambuc's authority over the French settlements in the Caribbean, in 1637 becoming governor of Martinique. He remained in Martinique and did not concern himself with the other islands.

The French permanently settled on Martinique and Guadeloupe after being kicked off Saint Kitts and Nevis (Saint-Christophe in French) by the British. Fort Royal (Fort-de-France) on Martinique was a major port for French warships in the region from which the French were able to explore the region. In 1638, Jacques Dyel du Parquet (1606–1658), nephew of Pierre Belain d'Esnambuc and first governor of Martinique, decided to have Fort Saint Louis built to protect the city against enemy attacks. From Fort Royal, Martinique, Du Parquet proceeded south in search for new territories and established the first settlement in Saint Lucia in 1643, and headed an expedition which established a French settlement in Grenada in 1649. Despite the long history of British rule, Grenada's French heritage is still evidenced by the number of French loanwords in Grenadian Creole, French-style buildings, cuisine and places name (For ex. Petit Martinique, Martinique Channel, etc.)

In 1642, the Compagnie des Îles de l'Amérique received a twenty-year extension of its charter. The King would name the Governor General of the company, and the company the Governors of the various islands. By the late 1640s, in France Mazarin had little interest in colonial affairs, and the company languished. In 1651 it dissolved itself, selling its exploitation rights to various parties. The du Paquet family bought Martinique, Grenada, and Saint Lucia for 60,000 livres. The sieur d'Houël bought Guadeloupe, Marie-Galante, La Desirade and the Saintes. The Knights of Malta bought Saint Barthélemy and Saint Martin, which were made dependencies of Guadeloupe. In 1665, the Knights sold the islands they had acquired to the newly formed (1664) Compagnie des Indes occidentales.

Dominica is a former French and British colony in the Eastern Caribbean, located about halfway between the French islands of Guadeloupe (to the north) and Martinique (to the south). Christopher Columbus named the island after the day of the week on which he spotted it, a Sunday (domingo in Spanish), 3 November 1493. In the hundred years after Columbus's landing, Dominica remained isolated. At the time it was inhabited by the Island Caribs, or Kalinago people, and over time more settled there after being driven from surrounding islands, as European powers entered the region. In 1690, French woodcutters from Martinique and Guadeloupe begin to set up timber camps to supply the French islands with wood and gradually become permanent settlers. France had a colony for several years, they imported slaves from West Africa, Martinique and Guadeloupe to work on its plantations. In this period, the Antillean Creole language developed. France formally ceded possession of Dominica to Great Britain in 1763. Great Britain established a small colony on the island in 1805. As a result, Dominicans speak English as an official language while Antillean creole is spoken as a secondary language and is well maintained due to its location between the French-speaking departments of Guadeloupe and Martinique.

In Trinidad, the occupying Spanish had contributed little towards advancements, despite the island's ideal location. Because it was considered underpopulated, Roume de St. Laurent, a Frenchman living in Grenada, was able to obtain a Cédula de Población from the Spanish king Charles III, on 4 November 1783, allowing French planters with their slaves, free coloreds and mulattos from the French Antilles of Martinique, Grenada, Guadeloupe and Dominica to migrate to Trinidad. The Spanish gave many incentives to lure settlers to the island, including exemption from taxes for ten years and land grants in accordance to the terms set out in the Cedula. This exodus was also encouraged by the French Revolution. These new immigrants established the local communities of Blanchisseuse, Champs Fleurs, Paramin, Cascade, Carenage and Laventille, adding to the ancestry of Trinadadians and creating the creole identity; Spanish, French, and Patois were the languages spoken. Trinidad's population jumped from just under 1,400 in 1777, to over 15,000 by the end of 1789. In 1797, Trinidad became a British crown colony, with a French-speaking population.

Islands of the French West Indies
Name	Largest settlement	Population (Jan. 2017)	Land area (km^{2})	Population density (inh. per km^{2})	Status
Martinique	Fort-de-France	372,594	1,128	330	Overseas department / region
Guadeloupe proper (Basse-Terre & Grande-Terre)	Pointe-à-Pitre	375,467	1,436	261	Overseas department / region
Saint Martin	Marigot	35,334	53	667	Overseas collectivity, detached from Guadeloupe on 22 February 2007.
Marie-Galante	Grand-Bourg	10,760	158	68	Dependency of Guadeloupe.
Saint Barthélemy	Gustavia	9,961	25	398	Overseas collectivity, detached from Guadeloupe on 22 February 2007.
Les Saintes	Terre-de-Haut	2,578	13	198	Dependency of Guadeloupe.
La Désirade	Beauséjour	1,448	21	69	Dependency of Guadeloupe.
French West Indies		842,247	2,834	398	

The two official French overseas departments are Guadeloupe and Martinique. Saint Martin and Saint Barthélemy, formerly attached to the department of Guadeloupe, have held separate status as overseas collectivities since 2007. These Caribbean Départments et Collectivités d’Outre Mer are also known as the French West Indies.

== French Caribbean ==
The French Caribbean (or Francophone Caribbean) includes all the French-speaking countries in the region. It can also refer to any area that exhibits a combination of French and Caribbean cultural influences in music, cuisine, style, architecture, and so on. The Francophone Caribbean is a part of the wider French America, which includes all the French-speaking countries in the Americas.

The term varies in meaning by its usage and frame of reference. It is not used much in France, unless the speaker wants to refer to every French dependency in the Caribbean region. The term's more ambiguous than the term "French West Indies", which refers specifically to the islands that are French overseas departments, which means they have overall the same laws and regulations as departments on the mainland of France. Collectivities can be included too.

The following Caribbean regions are predominantly French-speaking and/or French Creole-speaking:

- French Republic
  - French Guiana
  - Guadeloupe
  - Martinique
  - Saint Barthélemy
  - Saint Martin
- Sovereign state(s)
  - Dominica*
  - Haiti
  - Saint Lucia*

* Both countries gained independence from the United Kingdom. English is their official language, but French-based Creole languages are widely spoken by the island population due to a period of French colonization.

In addition, some of the islands of the present and former British West Indies were once ruled by France. Among some of them, a French-based creole language is spoken, whereas in others the language is nearing extinction; specific words and expressions may vary among the islands.

Area	Former territories	
Hispaniola	Haiti (Saint-Domingue)	
Lesser Antilles	Dominica; Grenada; Saint Croix (1651–1733); Saint Kitts (Saint-Christophe)	Saint Lucia; Saint Vincent and the Grenadines

== See also ==
- American West Indies
- British West Indies
- Danish West Indies
- Dutch West Indies
- List of governors general of the French Antilles
- Spanish West Indies
- Swedish West Indies
