= Culture of Martinique =

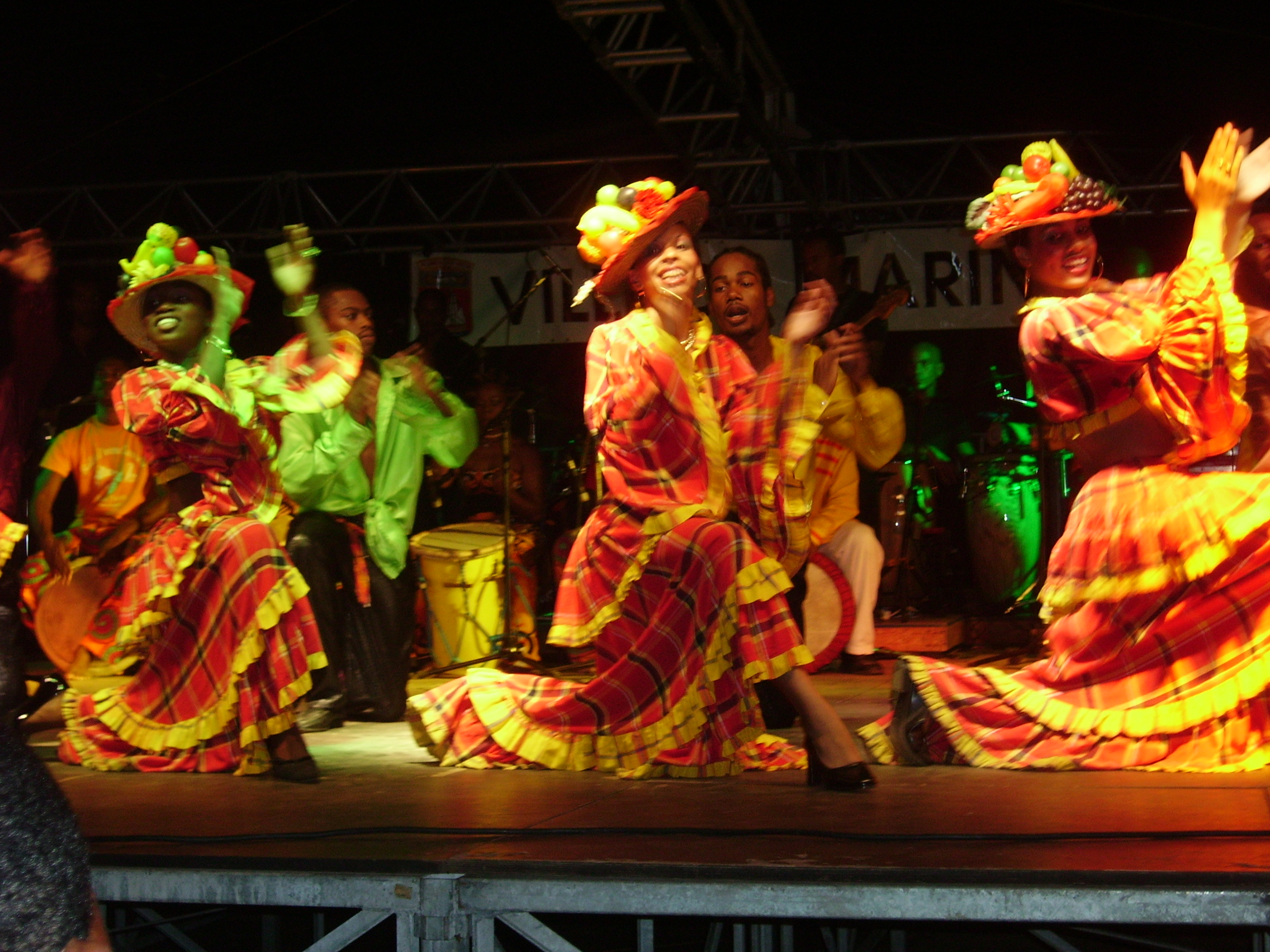
Martinique dancers in traditional costume.

As an overseas department of France, Martinique's culture is French, African, Indian and Caribbean. Its former capital, Saint-Pierre (destroyed by a volcanic eruption), was often referred to as the Paris of the Lesser Antilles. The official language is French, although many Martinicans speak a Creole patois. Based in French, Martinique's Creole also incorporates elements of English, Spanish, Portuguese, and African languages. Originally passed down through oral storytelling traditions, it continues to be used more often in speech than in writing.

Most of Martinique's population is descended from African slaves brought to work on sugar plantations during the colonial era, white slave owners or from Carib or Kalinago people.

Today, the island enjoys a higher standard of living than most other Caribbean countries. French products are easily available. Following French custom, many businesses close at midday, then reopen later in the afternoon. Among young people, studying in France is common. For the French, Martinique has been a vacation hotspot for many years, attracting both the upper class and more budget-conscious travelers.

== Music ==
Music contributes a great deal to Martinique's culture. The most popular style is zouk, which originated in Martinique and Guadeloupe by combining elements of a number of musical styles from the Caribbean and United States. Its biggest influence was biguine, which was popular dance orchestra music from the 1930s to 1950s. Zouk today has evolved from big band ensembles to smaller, electronically peppered bands. Musicians use synthesizers, DIGITAL samplers, and drum machines, which they program to sound like native percussion instruments.

Another favorite musical genre, bèlè is an early form of biguine which incorporates group dance and song accompanied by drumming, often led in a call and response style. For most of the year, local music dominates. But during Carnival, other music like calypso and soca can be heard as well.

== Festivals ==
Martinique's version of Carnival, is a four-day event beginning just before Lent and ending on its first day, with the burning of Vaval, a papier-mâché figure symbolizing Carnival. Businesses close during Carnival.

Like other Caribbean Carnivals, Martinique's is a high-energy event with parades, singing, drums, and other festivities. People dress up in costumes, with devils and she-devils being especially popular. During Carnival in Martinique, many men parade in drag queen costume, sometimes with very elaborate and provocative outfits, with no obvious hint at alternative sexuality. It must be mentioned that traditionally, some women dressed as men for burlesque weddings on Monday. The high presence of men in drag is a reference to the central role of women in Martinique's society and family structure.

Towns throughout Martinique elect their own Carnival Queen, Mini-Queen, and Queen Mother.

Halfway through Lent, Martinicans take a break from abstinence with the one-day holiday Micarême. The one-day mini-Carnival features dances, parties, and similar activities. Afterward, people return to their repentance until Easter begins.

Just as in France, every year on November 21, Martinique celebrates the release of the year's Beaujolais nouveau. In odd-numbered years in early December, the island hosts its prestigious Jazz à la Martinique. Both top local talent and internationally known musicians like Branford Marsalis perform at this jazz festival. Jazz Festivals all over the Caribbean are very enjoyable.

== Cuisine ==
French and Creole cuisine dominate Martinique's culinary landscape. The two styles also combine by using French techniques with local produce, such as breadfruit, cassava, and christophine (chayote). Creole dishes rely heavily on seafood, including curries and fritters. An exception is boudin, a Creole type of blood sausage. A dash of Chien sauce (made from onions, shallots, peppers, oil, and vinegar) adds a spicy touch to meals. The favored island drink, Ti punch, is a mixture of five parts of white rum to one part of sugarcane syrup. Crêperies, brasseries, and restaurants featuring cuisine from various French regions can be found all over Martinique.

== History of French Antilles culture ==
Pierre Belain d'Esnambuc was a French trader and adventurer in the Caribbean, who established the first permanent French colony, Saint-Pierre, on the island of Martinique in 1635. Belain sailed to the Caribbean in 1625, hoping to establish a French settlement. In 1626 he returned to France, where he won the support of Cardinal Richelieu to establish French colonies in the region. Richelieu became a shareholder in the Compagnie de Saint-Christophe. In 1635 d'Esnambuc sailed to Martinique with one hundred French settlers to clear land for sugarcane plantations.

After six months on Martinique, d'Esnambuc returned to St. Christopher, where he soon died prematurely in 1636, leaving the company and Martinique in the hands of his nephew, Du Parquet. His nephew, Jacques Dyel du Parquet, inherited d'Esnambuc's authority over the French settlements in the Caribbean. In 1637, his nephew, Jacques Dyel du Parquet, became governor of the island. He remained in Martinique.

The French permanently settled on Martinique after being driven off Saint Kitts and Nevis by the British. Fort Royal (Fort-de-France) on Martinique was a major port for French battle ships in the region from which the French were able to explore the region. In 1638, Jacques Dyel du Parquet (1606-1658), nephew of Pierre Belain d'Esnambuc and first governor of Martinique, decided to have Fort Saint Louis built to protect the city against enemy attacks.

Carnival had arrived with the French, indentured laborers and the slaves, who could not take part in Carnival, formed their own, parallel celebration called canboulay (from the French cannes brulées, meaning burnt cane) - the precursor for Trinidad's carnival and has played an important role in the development of Trinidad's culture. During the carnival season, the slaves performed songs in tents called Kaiso - later Calypso tents. Many early kaiso or calypso were performed in the French creole language and led by a griot or chantwell.

Calypsonians and Calypso Monarch competitions emerged and became extremely popular. Steelbands emerged all around Dominica and the rest of the Caribbean islands.

In the 1960s, a number of Haitian musicians to the French Antilles (Guadeloupe and Martinique) brought with them the kadans (another word named for the genre "compas"), a sophisticated form of music that quickly swept the island and helped unite all the former French colonies of the Caribbean by combining their cultural influences.

== See also ==
- Paul Gauguin Interpretation Centre
