= Jérôme du Sarrat, sieur de La Pierrière =

French soldier

Governor of Martinique (interim)
- In office February 1646 – 9 February 1647
- Preceded by: Jacques Dyel du Parquet
- Succeeded by: Jacques Dyel du Parquet

Personal details
- Occupation: Soldier

Jérôme du Sarrat, sieur de La Pierrière (or Hierome du Sara/Sarra de La Perrière) was a French soldier who was interim governor of Martinique in 1646–47 when the governor, Jacques Dyel du Parquet, was the prisoner of Phillippe de Longvilliers de Poincy, governor of Saint Christophe.

== Early career ==
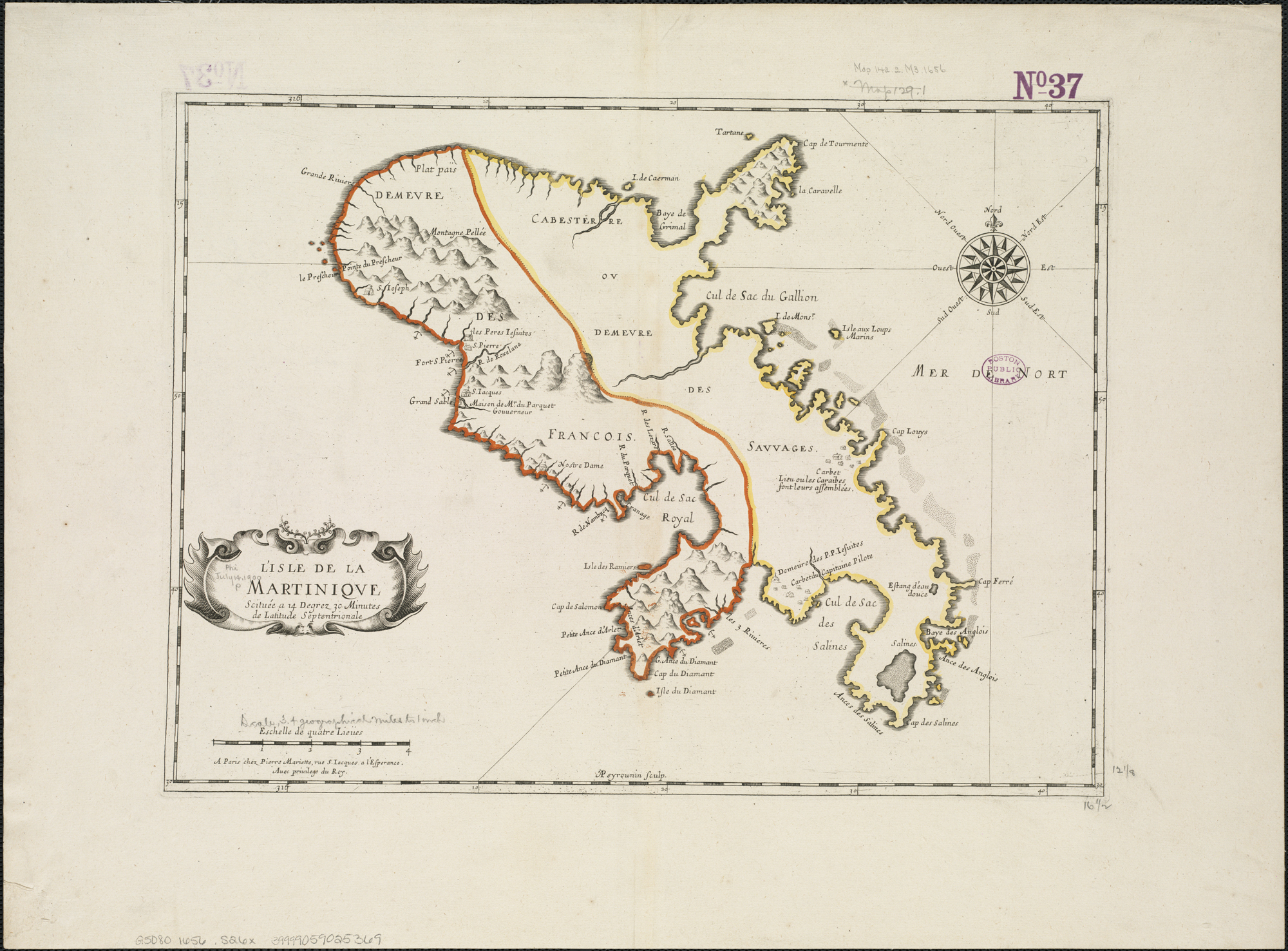
Martinique in 1656. The east of the island was still occupied by Caribs.

Jérôme du Sarrat, sieur de La Pierrière was originally from Gascony. He married Anne Houdan. He was a French officer and a deputy of Jacques Dyel du Parquet in the 1640s. On 21 November 1645 the Jesuit Charles Hempteau married du Parquet to Marie Bonnard of Paris. La Pierrière was one of the witnesses. The marriage seems to have been secret.

== Dispute with Governor General Poincy ==
Phillippe de Longvilliers de Poincy was named captain general by the French West India Company on 5 January 1638 and was appointed the king's lieutenant general in the American islands on 25 February 1638. Poincy was a quarrelsome man and a harsh authoritarian and earned many enemies. The company therefore decided to terminate his commission and look for a replacement. Noël Patrocles de Thoisy was named the King's lieutenant general of the American Islands on 20 February 1645. Poincy's nephew, Robert de Longvilliers, who was ready to embark at La Rochelle, was handed the order to be delivered personally to Poincy. Poincy received the order to return on 13 March 1645. In July 1645 he expelled the intendant general, Clerselier de Leumont, who retired to Guadeloupe, and sent his most troublesome opponents back to France.

Thoisy left Le Havre on 2 September 1645. After stopping in Martinique and Guadeloupe he reached Saint Christophe on 25 November 1645. Neither Poincy nor Sir Thomas Warner, governor of the English part of the island, would let him land. On 28 November 1645 he returned to Guadeloupe. In January 1646 Thoisy, with the support of du Parquet, led an expedition against Poincy and captured Poincy's two nephews. Poincy's forces, supported by militia provided by Warner, then defeated the company from Martinique. Thoisy escaped to Guadeloupe. Du Parquet took refuge first with the Capuchins and then with the English governor, who promptly gave him up to Poincy.

== Interim governor of Martinique ==
French colonies in the Lesser Antilles

La Pierrière was interim governor of Martinique from February 1646 to January 1647 during the absence of du Parquet. De Poincy wanted to stir up the people of Martinique against Thoisy, and prepared a document that violently libelled Thoisy personally, and the company of which he was the instrument. He sent a captain Boutain of La Rochelle to Martinique with this document. Le Pierrière heard of it, and had Boutain seized and placed in irons, preventing any insurrection for the time being. Around this time Caribs massacred some Frenchmen from three ships who were cutting wood on Saint Lucia. La Pierrière captured three pirogues of Caribs, who declared that it was Caribs from Saint Vincent who had committed the crime. Poincy seems to have been implicated in this act of hostility to Martinique.

There were two parties on the island. Neither wanted to pay dues to the company, but one remained attached to du Parquet, while the other led by a Parisian named Beaufort would not receive him when he returned unless he was named by the king rather than the company. Although the difference seems minor, tempers ran high. On 26 June 1646 some hotheads from Le Prêcheur cried in La Pierrière's presence that they would not pay any dues to the company, but La Pierrière did not respond to this declaration of mutiny. A few days later two of Poincy's emissaries arrived from Guadeloupe and said that the inhabitants of that island had taken up arms and in response governor Charles Houël du Petit Pré had suppressed their rights. Again, La Pierrière said nothing. On 7 July 1646, thinking that his silence meant he supported them, some rebels plundered the stores of La Prêcheur merchants. On 10 July 1646 the house of Parquet's intendant, the sieur de Lespérance, was burned with all its contents.

Parquet's partisans and his wife Marie Bonnard were concerned by La Pierrière's equivocal attitude, which served to encourage the sedition. Le Fort decided the solution was to kill Beaufort and his fellows, and if necessary to kill La Pierrière. He went to La Pierrière and demanded to know whose side he was on. La Pierrière said he was on the side of Parquet but was powerless to act. He promised to do what Le Fort proposed. Le Fort told him that the next day, 6 August, Beaufort would arrive with his co-rebels and force him to sign a document. He should do so, then propose that they drink the health of the king. While they were doing so he should give the sign, and Le Fort's men would fall on them. Everything happened as predicted. Beaufort arrived with twenty accomplices. After signing the document and drinking a toast to the king, La Pierrière raised his gun as if to fire into the air, then lowered it, fired at Beaufort's head and killed him. At this signal Le Fort's men burst into the house and killed the others. La Pierrière sent word of what had happened to Guadeloupe the next day. Thoisy sent an officer to Martinique who published a general amnesty dated 23 September 1646 for everyone who had been involved in the recent disturbances. Le Pierriere again took an oath to the king and his lieutenant general Thoisy.

On 16 and 28 October 1646 the king ordered Poincy and Thoisy to exchange prisoners, thus implicitly giving Poincy an amnesty for his revolt since he was opposed to the company and its abuses rather than opposed to the king. In November 1646 Houël started a revolt against Thoisy, claiming that his presence on Guadeloupe deprived him of his rights as governor. Thoisy managed to end the revolt on 22 November with a display of friendship for Houël. Thoisy heard that he was to be assassinated, and on 31 December 1646 embarked for Martinique, which he reached on 3 January 1647.

Poincy sent five ships and 800 men to seize Thoisy. During the night of January 16–17 1647 a council was held on Martinique in the home of Marie Bonnard du Parquet, the governor's wife, in which it was decided to arrest Thoisy. A resolution was drawn up and signed by La Pierrière, de Rossillon, de la Renardière, de Beaujeu, de la Haye and Lefort, who was to make the arrest. De le Housaye's name was added with a note that he had not signed because he did not know how to write. On 17 January 1647 Thoisy was arrested and delivered to Poincy's men in exchange for Du Parquet. Du Parquet was released on 6 February. He returned to Martinique on 9 February 1677.

== Later career ==
Around the start of 1654 the master of a ship subjected a Carib of Saint Vincent to a severe punishment on the pretext that one of his sailors had been murdered. The Caribs took this as sufficient cause to declare war against the French. The few French who were living on Saint Vincent were killed. Parquet embarked 150 men on three ships under La Pierrière, who descended on Saint Vincent and for eight days attacked the Caribs and pillaged, burned or destroyed all they could lay their hands on before returning the Martinique. Hostilities then broke out on Martinique, where the Caribs at first gained the upper hand before being driven back to the eastern part of the island.

In the second half of 1672 the French Governor General Jean-Charles de Baas learned of the outbreak of the Franco-Dutch War, and began to organize an expedition against the Dutch base on Curaçao. He led the expedition against Curaçao early in 1673. The assault failed and on 18 March 1763 he ordered a retreat. During their stay at Tortuga after the failed expedition Baas appointed La Pierrière acting governor in April 1673 the absence of Bertrand d'Ogeron de La Bouëre. Baas thought that d'Ogeron had died in Puerto Rico and on 16 April 1673 appointed Pierriere in his place. Ogeron soon returned and took charge again.

== Sources ==
- Birch, Chris (2011-06-09), The Milk Jug Was a Goat, E-Books Publisher, ISBN 978-1-78069-018-6
- Dator, James F. (2011), Search for a New Land: Imperial Power and Afro-Creole Resistance in the British Leeward Islands 1624-1745 (PDF) (Doctoral thesis), University of Michigan
- Dessalles, Adrien; Dessalles, Pierre Régis (1847), Histoire générale des Antilles ... (in French), Libraire-éditeur
- Dubé, Jean-Claude (2005-04-28), The Chevalier de Montmagny: First Governor of New France, University of Ottawa Press, ISBN 978-0-7766-1705-3
- Eyma, Xavier (1860), Le roi des tropiques (in French), M. Lévy Frères
- Guët, L. (1893), Origines de la Martinique : le Colonel François de Collart et la Martinique de son temps, Vannes: Lafoyle
- Guillaume, Bernadette; Rossignol, Philippe; Du Chaxel (September 1982), "Un Projet De Vente De L'ile De Saint-christophe", Cahier (in French) (2), Centre De Genealogie Et D'histoire Des Iles D'amerique
- "Index des noms cités dans des chroniqueurs", Généalogie et Histoire de la Caraïbe (in French), 20 March 2006
- Laprise, Raynald (2017), "La Perrière, le sieur de", Un dictionnaire biographique de la flibuste (in French)
- Marcillac, Sidney Daney de (1846), Histoire de la Martinique: depuis la colonisation jusqu'en 1815 (in French), E. Ruelle
- Margry, Pierre (1863), Origines transatlantiques: Belain d'Esnambuc et les Normands aux Antilles, d'après des documents nouvellement retrouvés (in French), A. Faure
- Marley, David (2008), Wars of the Americas: A Chronology of Armed Conflict in the Western Hemisphere, 1492 to the Present, ABC-CLIO, ISBN 978-1-59884-100-8
- Marley, David (2010), Pirates of the Americas, ABC-CLIO, ISBN 978-1-59884-201-2
- Martineau, Alfred; May, L-Ph (1935), Trois siècles d'histoire antillaise : Martinique et Guadeloupe de 1635 à nos jours (PDF) (in French), Paris: Société de l'histoire des colonies françaises et Librairie Leroux
- Saint-Méry, Médéric Louis Élie Moreau de (1784), Loix et constitutions des colonies françoises de l'Amerique sous le vent... (in French), L'Auteur
