= Jean Le Comte =

Governor of Grenada

Governor of Grenada
- In office 1649–1654
- Preceded by: (none)
- Succeeded by: Louis Cacqueray de Valminière

Personal details
- Died: 1654 Grenada

Jean Le Comte (died 1654) was the first governor of Grenada, holding office from 1649 to 1654. He led systematic efforts to kill the indigenous Caribs or drive them off the island.

== Settlement of Grenada ==
Locations in the Lesser Antilles

On 17 March 1649 two barks under Governor Jacques Dyel du Parquet (Note: Du Parquet had been the Governor of Martinique on behalf of the Compagnie des Îles de l'Amérique (Company of the Isles of America) since 1637.) of Martinique arrived in Saint George's harbour, Grenada. 145 settlers landed and over the next eight days threw up a stockade they named Fort Annunciation on a site that Captain La Rivière had previously explored. Du Parquet left on 6 April 1649 after appointing his cousin Jean Le Compte governor of Grenada. Le Comte was aged 55.

The Island Caribs led by chief Chief Kairouane were at first suspicious of the settlers but not hostile. This changed in November 1649 when eleven large canoes arrived from Saint Vincent with several hundred warriors looking for revenge for an insult they had suffered in the Grenadines. The settlers retreated to the fort where they remained for eight days while the Caribs destroyed their property, and then left.

== Destruction of the indigenous people ==
On 26 May 1650 du Parquet brought 300 men from Martinique to join the Grenada settlers in a surprise attack on the Caribs, who had been picking off isolated Frenchmen. A Carib defector led 60 French musketeers up a hill to surround about 80 Caribs who were sleeping beside a cliff. Caught in a crossfire, the Caribs who were not shot jumped from the cliff to their death. The site became known as the Morne des Sauteurs, or "Jumpers' Headland". Du Parquet had a second small fort, Fort Saint Jean, built and manned by 70 troops. He left the island on 7 June 1650.

The Caribs of Grenada asked their kin in Dominica and Saint Vincent for help. This was the start of a war throughout the island. Some took refuge in the east coast mountains, but Le Comte raised a force of 150 men to hunt them out, and burned their houses and fields. The French destroyed the Carib pirogues to prevent them reaching other islands where they could take refuge or get help. La Comte himself drowned in a canoe accident. (Note: The sources disagree over dates and the sequence of events. The Grenada Almanack and Father du Tetre state that du Parquet first arrived in 1650. A 2017 account also gives 1650 as the date of first arrival, and has the Carib reinforcements from Dominica and Saint Vincent arriving after the 300 soldiers sent by du Parquet arrived.) He died in 1654 and was succeeded as governor by Louis Cacqueray de Valminière.

== Sources ==
- Crask, Paul (2017-11-05), Grenada: Carriacou and Petite Martinique, Bradt Travel Guides, ISBN 978-1-78477-062-4
- Grenada Heritage: Governors of Grenada, National Archives of Grenada, 1 August 2004
- Honychurch, Lennox (2002), The Leap at Sauteurs: The lost cosmology of indigenous Grenada, University of the West Indies
- Marley, David (1998), Wars of the Americas: A Chronology of Armed Conflict in the New World, 1492 to the Present, ABC-CLIO, ISBN 978-0-87436-837-6
- Martin, Robert Montgomery (1836), History of the West Indies ..., Whittaker
- Steele, Beverley A. (2003), Grenada. A History of its People, Macmillan, ISBN 0-201-52396-5
