= 2023 in Martinique =

- Decades: 2000s; 2010s; 2020s
- See also: Other events of 2023; Timeline of Martinique history

Events in the year 2023 in Martinique.

== Incumbents ==
- President of Executive: Alfred Marie-Jeanne

== Events ==
- 2 February: The Flag of Martinique is officially adopted.
- June: The French Nahel Merzouk riots spillover to Martinique with fires being reported in Fort-de-France, Le Carbet, and Le Robert.
