= 2024 in Martinique =

- Decades: 2000s; 2010s; 2020s
- See also: Other events of 2024; Timeline of Martinique history

Events in the year 2024 in Martinique.

== Incumbents ==
- President of Executive: Alfred Marie-Jeanne

== Events ==
- June 30: Hurricane Beryl impacts Martinique.
- September: 2024 Martinique social unrest
