= Bazire =

Bazire is a surname. Notable people with the surname include:

- Charles Bazire (1624–1677), businessmen in New France
- Francis Bazire (born 1939), retired French cyclist
- Jean-Michel Bazire (born 1971), French harness racing driver
- Louis Bazire (1877–1923), French politician
- Reginald Bazire (1900–1990), British Anglican priest
