= Christophine =

Name list

Christophine is a feminine given name primarily of English origin but also with African and Latin roots. The name derives from Saint Christopher. Notable people with the name include:

== Real ==
- Christophine Mutharika (died 1990), wife of politician Peter Mutharika
- Christophine Reinwald (1757–1847), German artist
- Johanne Christophine Stenersen (1855–1936), mother of naval officer Henry Diesen

== Fictional ==
- Christophine, character from the 2016 film Arctic Heart.
- Christophine, character from the 1941 film Premier rendez-vous.
- Christophine, character from Wide Sargasso Sea (1966) by Jean Rhys

== See also ==
- Christophene, an alternative name for chayote
- Christopher, a given name
- Christoph, a given name and surname
