= Charles Bazire =

Businessman in New France (1624–1677)

Charles Bazire (1624–1677) was one of the first well documented businessmen of New France.

Bazire came to the New World in 1660 as receiver general of duties and quickly became active in business, most notably real estate. After the formation of the French West India Company in 1664, he was their agent in New France where they held the fur-trading monopoly. By 1672 he was involved in the cod fishing industry with two fish factories. He also had land grants used for cutting timber.

He appears to have been the recipient of various land grants, both singly and in partnership, from Intendant Talon and Bishop Laval. All the business activities left a substantial estate at his death. With half his estate going to his wife, the remainder endowed a number of religious organizations. Some of note were the Jesuits, the Ursulines, the Hôtel-Dieu, and the Recollets.
