= Jean Dupont (governor) =

Governor of Martinique
- In office 17 September 1635 – 1636
- Preceded by: Pierre Belain d'Esnambuc
- Succeeded by: Jacques Dyel du Parquet

Personal details
- Occupation: Soldier

Jean Dupont (or Jacques Du Pont) was the first local governor of Martinique after the island had been taken by French forces under Pierre Belain d'Esnambuc in 1635. Accounts of events are confused, but after some fighting he managed to establish an uneasy peace with the Kalinago, who withdrew to the east of the island. He was returning to report to d'Esnambuc in Saint Christophe when he was shipwrecked, taken captive by the Spanish, and held captive for the next three years.

== Career ==
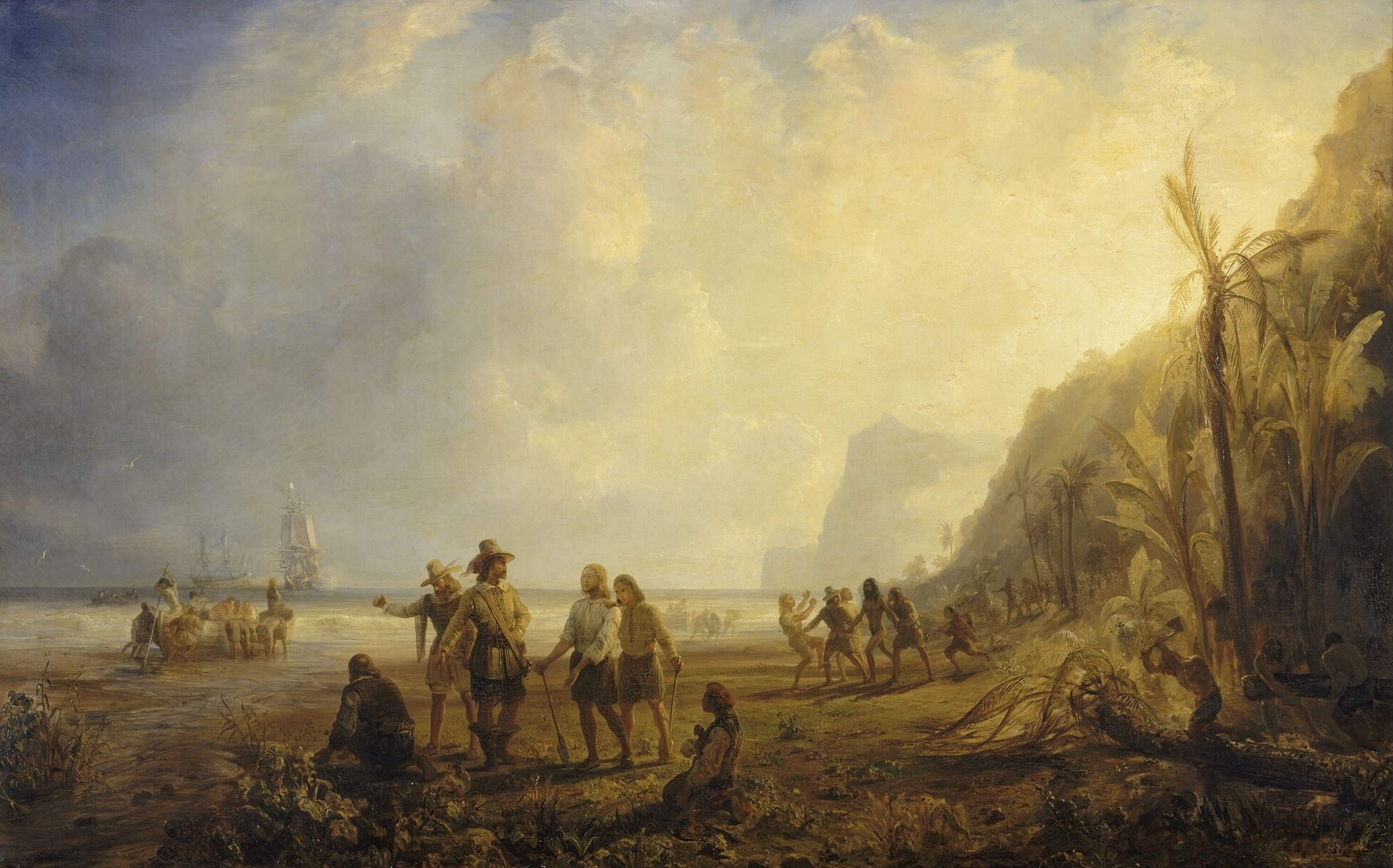
19th century depiction of d'Esnambuc arriving on Martinique

Du Pont was appointed governor of Martinique in 1635 to replace Pierre Belain d'Esnambuc. D'Esnambuc was the first governor and lieutenant general for the king on the islands of America, holding office from 1626 to December 1636. He had established the French colony on Saint Christophe. In 1635 he was confirmed as lieutenant general by the newly created Compagnie des Îles de l'Amérique and authorized to colonize Martinique. D'Esnambuc landed in Martinique with 100 experienced men on 15 September 1635. He was accompanied by Jean Dupont, lieutenant of the company in Saint Christophe. (Note: An account written in 1640 by the Jesuit priest Jacques Bouton says that de Nambuc sent du Pont to Martinique with about 80 soldiers, with orders to settle on the island. Soon after another 40 men arrived under the sieur de la Vallée, who became lieutenant and later captain of the island.) Dupont was a relative of d'Enambuc.

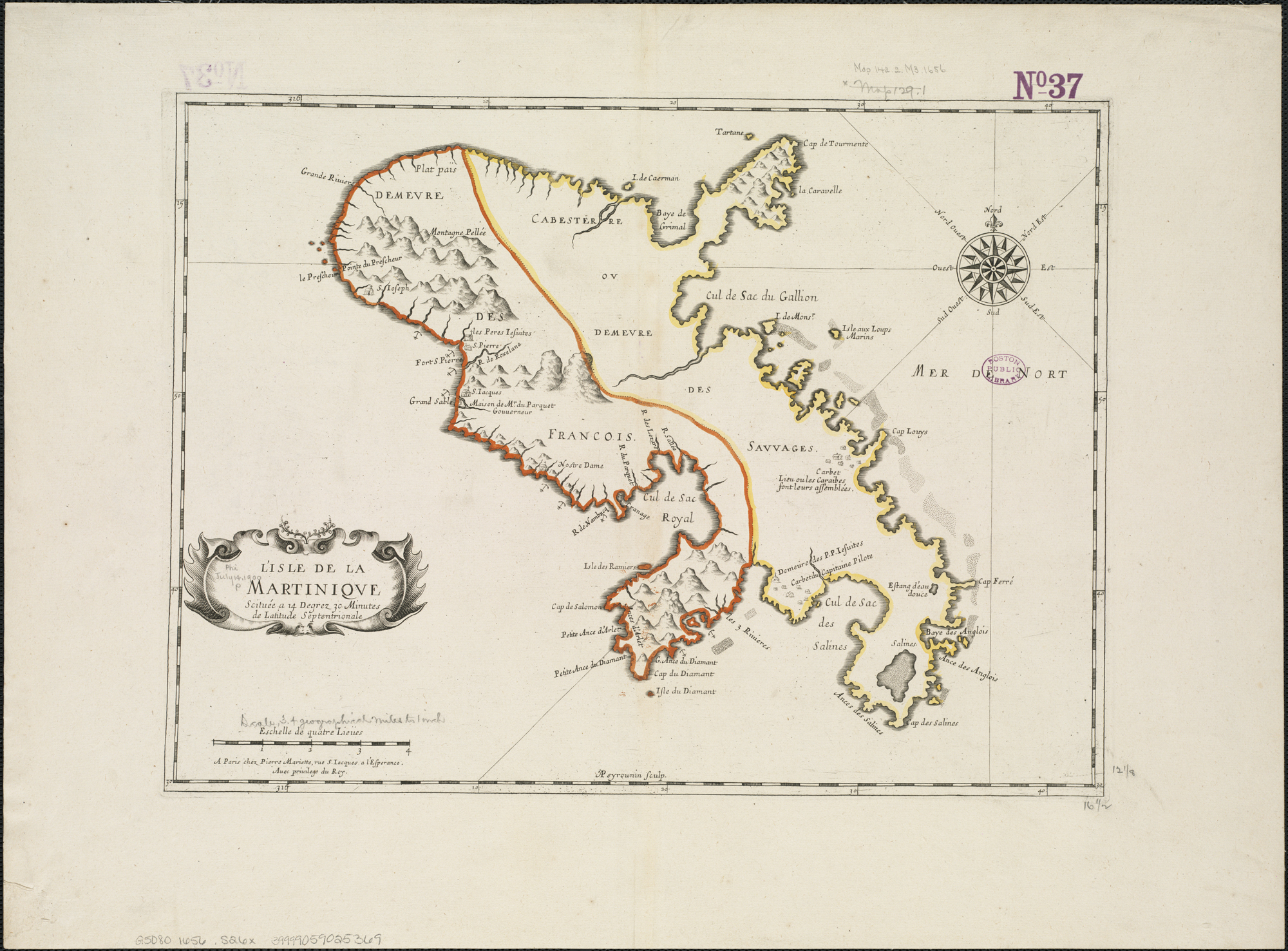
1656 map with French in the west and Caribs in the east

D'Esnambuc made a treaty with the Kalinago. He quickly built a fort beside the sea, which he named Fort Saint-Pierre. He also built a residence, then returned to Saint Christophe in November 1635. He named Dupont as the first local governor of Martinique. Dupont was appointed on 17 September 1625. He was described as a man of great courage and prudence. After d'Esnambuc left the Caribs attacked the fort, but Dupont defeated them. (Note: Accounts vary. One source says war had to be made on the Caribs, and could only be ended by their complete expulsion. "When the Caribs were not numerous enough to engage in open fight, they used to attack the French in detail; they slew many of them, with their clubs or poisoned arrows, and under cover of night they used to burn the dwellings, and ravage the plantations of the colonists. DUPONT found it easier to deal with the Caribs of Martinique, than LOLIVE with those of Guadeloupe..." Another account says the Caribs, wanting to wipe out the French, called for reinforcements from Dominica, Saint Vincent and Guadeloupe, and a total of 1,500 attacked the fort at Saint Pierre but were unable to take it. Denambuc sent 50 reinforcements under Delavallée, and at that the natives gave up and sued for peace. A third account says that when the army of 1,000 Caribs attacked they were met by a devastating volley of grapeshot from the fort's artillery, which destroyed their morale. In the months that followed Du Pont managed to restore trust and establish peaceful relations.) The Caribs retired to the Cabesterre (east) section of the island, or to other islands.

Dupont was returning to Saint Christophe to confer with d'Enambuc when he was wrecked in a storm on the shore of Santo Domingo. The Spanish took him prisoner and held him in close captivity for three years. Thinking Dupont was dead, d'Esnambuc appointed his nephew Jacques Dyel du Parquet to replace him. Du Parquet, who had also been appointed Lieutenant General of Martinique by the Company, arrived on the island on 20 January 1637.

== Sources ==
- "1502-1674 : La découverte de la Martinique et les débuts de sa colonisation", Martinique île à vivre (in French)
- Bouton, Pere Jacques (1640), Relation de l'establissement des francois depuis l'an 1635 en l'isle de la Martinique... (in French), chez Sebastien Cramoisy
- Cahoon, Ben, "Martinique", Worldstatesmen.org
- Dessalles, Pierre Régis (1847), Histoire legislative des Antilles ou Annales du conseil souverain de la Martinique (etc.): 3 (in French), France
- Guérin, Léon (1891), "The Foundation of the French Power in the West Indies - 1625-1664", Timehri, translated from Les Navigateurs Français by Mrs. George Dawson, Royal Agricultural and Commercial Society, JSTOR 60231068
- Lampin, Didier, Gouverneurs Generaux des Îles et Gouverneurs Particuliers de la Martinique (in French), archived from the original on 2016-03-04
- "Les Colonies Francaises: Martinique", Revue maritime et coloniale (in French), Le Ministère, 1864
- Marley, David (1998), Wars of the Americas: A Chronology of Armed Conflict in the New World, 1492 to the Present, ABC-CLIO, ISBN 978-0-87436-837-6
- Pardon, Jean Marie (1877), La Martinique depuis sa découverte jusqu'a nos jours (in French), Chalamel
- Peytraud, Lucien Pierre (2011-02-17), Esclavage aux Antilles Françaises Avant 1789 (in French), Cambridge University Press, ISBN 978-1-108-02599-7
- Rambosson, Jean Pierre (1868), Les colonies françaises: géographie, histoire, productions; administration et commerce (in French), Delagrave
