= Cailleville =

- Commune
- Coat of arms
- Location of Cailleville
- Location within France Location within Normandy
- Coordinates: 49°49′57″N 0°43′59″E
- Country: France
- Region: Normandy
- Department: Seine-Maritime
- Arrondissement: Dieppe
- Canton: Saint-Valery-en-Caux
- Intercommunality: CC Côte d'Albâtre

Government
  - Mayor (2020–2026): Pierre-Luc Billiez
- Area^{1}: 5.03 km^{2} (1.94 sq mi)
- Elevation: 75 m (246 ft)
- Highest elevation: 84 m (276 ft)
- Lowest elevation: 20 m (66 ft)
- Population (2023): 244
  - Density: 48.5/km^{2} (126/sq mi)
- Time zone: UTC+01:00 (CET)
  - Summer (DST): UTC+02:00 (CEST)
- INSEE/Postal code: 76151 /76460
- ^{1} French Land Register data, which excludes lakes, ponds, glaciers > 1 km^{2} (0.386 sq mi or 247 acres) and river estuaries.

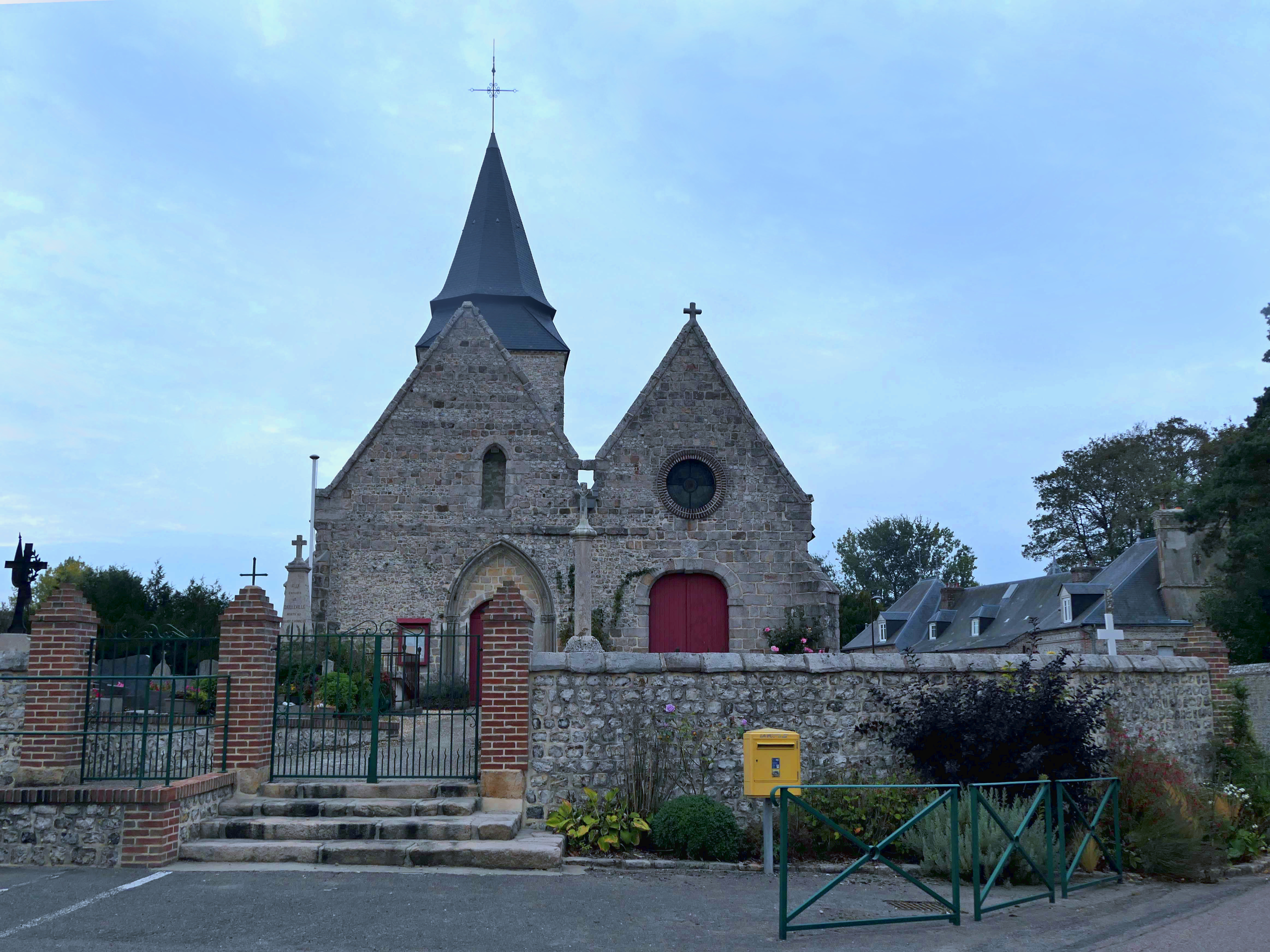
Stone church surrounded by enclosed cemetery in Cailleville

Cailleville (French pronunciation: [kajvil]) is a commune in the Seine-Maritime department in the Normandy region in northern France.

== Population ==
Historical population
Year	Pop.	±% p.a.
1968	185	—
1975	140	−3.90%
1982	188	+4.30%
1990	208	+1.27%
1999	231	+1.17%
2007	258	+1.39%
2012	262	+0.31%
2017	264	+0.15%
2023	244	−1.30%
Source: INSEE

== See also ==
- Communes of the Seine-Maritime department
