= Jacques Dyel du Parquet =

French governor of Martinique and Saint Lucia

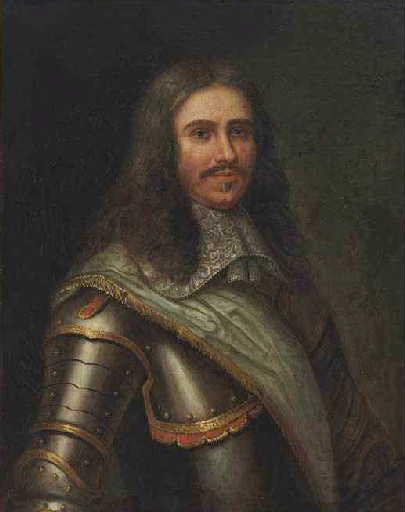

Governor of Martinique
- In office 1636 – February 1646
- Preceded by: Jean Dupont
- Succeeded by: Jérôme du Sarrat, sieur de La Pierrière (acting)

Governor of Martinique
- In office 9 February 1647 – 1658
- Preceded by: Jérôme du Sarrat, sieur de La Pierrière (acting)
- Succeeded by: Marie Bonnard du Parquet

Personal details
- Born: 1606 Cailleville, Normandy, France
- Died: 3 January 1658 (aged 51–52) Martinique
- Occupation: Soldier

Jacques Dyel du Parquet (1606 – 3 January 1658) was a French soldier who was one of the first governors of Martinique. He was appointed governor of the island for the Compagnie des Îles de l'Amérique in 1636, a year after the first French settlement had been established. In 1650 he purchased Martinique, Grenada and Saint Lucia. He did much to develop Martinique as a colony, including introduction of sugarcane.

== Early years (1606–36) ==
Jacques Dyel du Parquet (Note: One source gives his name as Jacques d'Iel, Sieur du Parquet.) was born in 1606 in Cailleville, Normandy. An act recording a 1657 ceremony to bless his wedding names him as "Jacques Dyel, squire, sieur Du Parquet, governor of this island, son of Pierre Dyel, squire, lord of Vaudroques and of Adrienne de Blain, native of Calville". His parents had married on 11 January 1589.

Du Parquet's uncle was Pierre Belain d'Esnambuc, the French King's Governor and Lieutenant General of the Isles of America. (Note: His uncle named himself as "Nous, Pierre de Blain, escuyer, sieur de d'Esnambuc, capitaine entretenu de la marine et gouverneur pour le Roy en l'isle de Saint-Christophe des Indes occidentales.") On 26 October 1626 a deed of agreement was signed to send French colonists under captains d'Esnambuc and du Rossey to settle in Saint Kitts (Saint Christophe) and other unoccupied islands. The expedition of about 530 men in three ships sailed on 22 February 1627. After landing on Saint Kitts the French signed a Treaty of Agreement with the English on 13 May 1627 under which they divided the island.

In 1629 a large Spanish war fleet under Fadrique de Toledo anchored off Saint Kitts and sent troops ashore who entrenched near the French settlement. The French and English united against the Spanish. Du Parquet's brother commanded 120 men. When the English took flight he was given permission to attack the Spanish. The attack failed with many casualties. Du Parquet's brother was captured and later died of his wounds. Du Rossey returned to France where he was imprisoned in the Bastille, while d'Esnambuc sailed with most of the French colonists for Antigua.

D'Esnambuc rallied his forces, and returned to Saint Kitts three months later, where the small French colony of 360 men began to prosper. In mid-1635 d'Esnambuc led an expedition of 100 men to Martinique under an officer named Dupont and founded the town of Saint-Pierre.

== Governor of Martinique (1636–50) ==
Dupont was returning to Saint Christophe when he was captured by the Spanish, and du Parquet was sent to replace him. The Compagnie des Îles de l'Amérique (Company of the Islands of America), whose administration included Martinique, confirmed du Parquet as governor. Du Parquet was officially named Governor in 1637. He first settled at Saint-Pierre, then built a military camp that would become Fort-de-France on a strategically placed rocky outcrop in what is now Lamentin Bay.

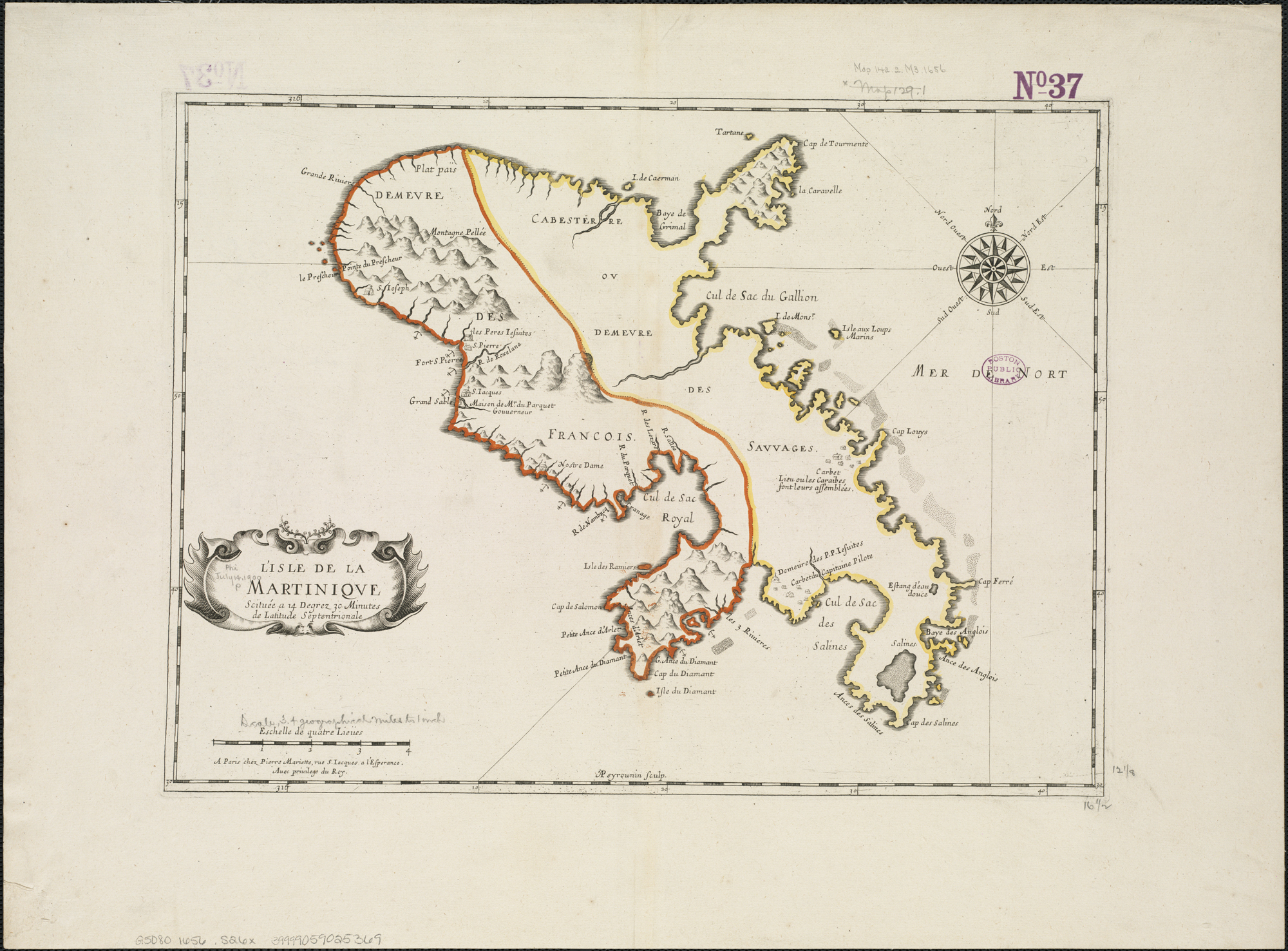
Map of Martinique by Nicolas Sanson published in 1656 showing the division between the French and Carib parts

In 1637 du Parquet concluded a truce with the Island Caribs under which the French would hold the leeward coast and the Caribs the remainder of the island. Tensions rose in 1639 when du Parquet arrested the Carib chief Kayerman. The chief escaped but died from a viper bite. Relations gradually improved, with the Caribs often visiting the French to trade and accept small gifts. Du Parquet would dress as a native when visiting the Caribs, but always remained armed. Du Parquet gained a reputation as a fair and generous governor as well as a brave leader of the militia. He was capable and popular. By 1639 the colony had 700 men, and this had grown to 1,000 by 1640.

Phillippe de Longvilliers de Poincy was appointed Lieutenant General of the French islands from 1638 onward, and had nothing but praise for du Parquet. Later the two men became enemies. Noël Patrocle de Thoisy was appointed to replace Poincy on 20 February 1645 on the recommendation of the French regent, Anne of Austria. Poincy refused to accept his dismissal. Thoisy left Le Havre on 2 September 1645 but was not allowed to enter the port of Saint-Christophe and had to take refuge in Guadeloupe. Du Parquet met him there and on his advice Poincy's two nephews were seized for use as blackmail. However, du Parquet was himself betrayed and taken captive by Poincy. At the end of January 1647 Thoisy was turned over to Poincy, who forced him to return to France on a ship bound for Saint-Malo.

On 21 November 1645 by the Jesuit Charles Hempteau married Dyel du Parquet to Marie Bonnard of Paris. His wife's marriage to an important company official had been annulled and she apparently married du Parquet secretly. During the Thoisy affair his wife led a group in Martinique that demanded the exchange of Poincy's captured nephews for her husband. After his release and return to Martinique du Parquet publicly acknowledged the marriage. The Jesuit Jean Tehenel blessed the wedding on 30 April 1647 in Saint-Jacques chapel, Martinique, in the presence of several witnesses. Their children were Jean Jacques Dyel, Louis Dyel, Seigneur du Parquet; Françoise and Marie.

== Grenada and Saint Lucia ==
Locations in the Lesser Antilles

On 17 March 1649 a French expedition of 203 men from Martinique led by Jacques Dyel du Parquet landed at St. Georges Harbour, Grenada and built a fortified settlement, which they named Fort Annunciation. (Note: Another source says it was not until June 1650 that du Parquet took a band of French settlers to found a colony on Grenada.) A treaty was swiftly agreed between du Parquet and the indigenous Chief Kairouane to peacefully partition the island between the two communities. Du Parquet returned to Martinique leaving his cousin Jean Le Comte as Governor of Grenada. Conflict broke out between the French and the indigenous islanders in November 1649 and fighting lasted for five years until 1654, when the last opposition to the French on Grenada was crushed. In 1650 de Parquet also sent between thirty five and forty men to found a colony in Saincte Alouzie (Saint Lucia) led by an officer named de Rousselan. The English had abandoned the island since being driven out by the Caribs in 1640.

== Governor and proprietor of Martinique (1650–58) ==
The Martinique settlers revolted against the Compagnie des îles d'Amérique in 1646. The directors liquidated the company, and in 1649 proposed that du Parquet should buy Martinique and the neighbouring islands. On 18 May 1650 a procuration was drawn up in Martinique before a Notary Royal to purchase Martinique, Grenada, Saint Lucia and the Grenadines from the company. Du Parquet appointed Charles de la Forge of Pleine-Sève, near Dieppe, to act as his agent. The purchase contract was drawn up before Notaries Royal at Paris on 27 September 1650. Du Parquet became sole owner of the islands to enjoy and dispose of them as he chose, subject only to the King's charges and conditions that the company had accepted in 1642. The price was 41,500 livres, made up of a bill of exchange for 4,000 livres followed by instalment payments to be completed by 30 November 1653. (Note: The old Handbook of Saint Lucia records that M. Houel and M. du Parquet bought the island in September 1650. This is an error. Governor Charles Houël du Petit Pré of Guadeloupe purchased that island in 1649, and the compilers of the Handbook seem to have mixed up the texts.)

Du Parquet instituted a citizen's militia to guard against invasion by Indians or Spanish. He tried to improve agriculture. The main export of the island was pétun (tobacco), which was easy to grow and harvest, but prices in Europe were falling. Attempts had been made to raise sugarcane, but the islanders were unable to master the technique of extracting the sugar. He issued an ordinance that slave owners had to give their slaves "at least two pounds of meat per head in the late season, and three when the ships arrive."

On 13 March 1651 he formally named his oldest son, Dyel d'Esnambuc, his lieutenant-general. The Sieur de Saint-Aubin was to undertake the duties of this office while his son was under age. At the start of 1651 du Parquet returned to France. His purchase was given royal ratification in August 1651. On 22 October 1651 the King appointed du Parquet Governor and Lieutenant General over the islands he had bought. At the end of 1652 du Parquet again returned to France for health reasons. He left Médéric Rools de Gourselas in charge as Major during the minority of his son.

In 1653 a series of attacks and reprisals began between the Caribs who occupied some parts of Saint Vincent in the Grenadines, Dominica and Antigua, and the English and French who occupied the other parts. In 1654 Martinique was invaded by these Caribs, who were joined by the local Caribs in revolt against the French. The colonists' problems were compounded by an uprising of the slaves. Du Parquet's fort, "La Montagne", was besieged and was on the point of falling when four Dutch ships arrived from Brazil and saved the situation by disembarking 300 well-armed soldiers.

The Dutch ships carried a group of Portuguese Jews who were skilled in processing sugar, had been expelled from Brazil, and had brought their material, technicians and slaves. Du Parquet granted them land and they installed the first sugar refineries, the start of an economic revolution on the island. The Governor was required by the terms of sale to uphold the Catholic religion, but in practice economic development was a more important consideration. The Jesuit superior later forced du Parquet to expel a band of Dutch Calvinists led by the sugar merchant Trezel. Their refinery may have been failing anyway. They settled in Guadeloupe and played an important role in the sugar industry there. In 1655 du Parquet sold Grenada to Jean Faudoas, count of Serillac. The price was the equivalent of £1890.

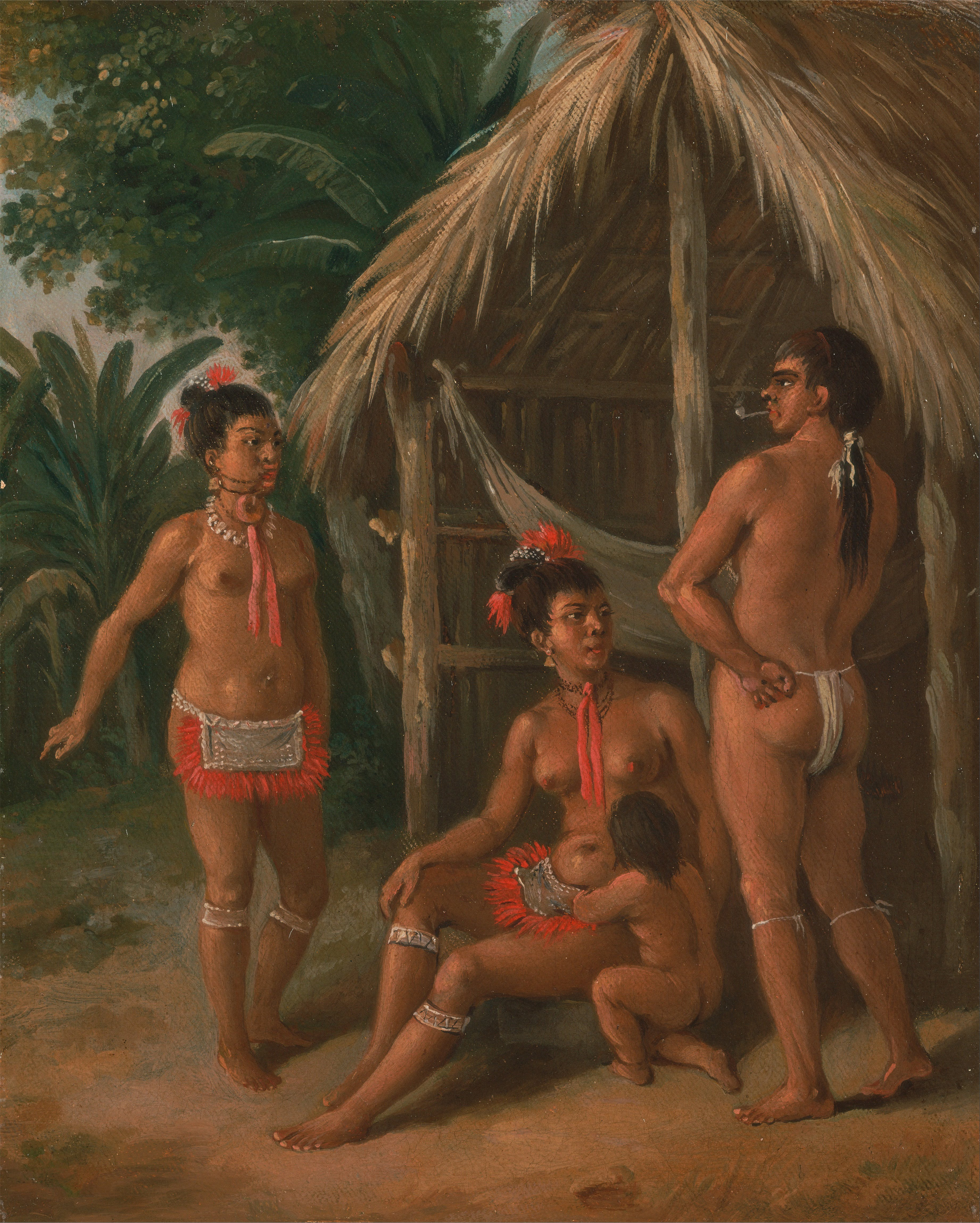
A romantic European depiction of Island Caribs

In 1656 Martinique was struck by a violent earthquake. Later that year the slaves again revolted, with the support of the Caribs. In 1656 a ship outbound from Nantes stopped at Martinique, carrying an expedition to the coast of Guiana under the sieur De la Vigne. Du Parquet was hostile at first, then relented and provided supplies. The initial reluctance to help may be explained by the fact that the colonists in Martinique were engaged in a desperate struggle with the Caribs. His change of position may have been caused by his learning the identify of the expedition's powerful backers, who seem to have been the Queen and Cardinal Mazarin. After a long war du Parquet finally managed to restore order in his islands and concluded peace with the Caribs on 18 October 1657.

== Death and legacy ==
Du Parquet died in Saint-Pierre on 3 January 1658 aged 52. After his death his wife took charge of the island as regent in the name of her oldest son, Louis Dyel d'Esnambuc. On 15 September 1658 the King appointed his son Governor and Lieutenant General of Martinique and Saint Lucia, with du Parquet's brother Adrien Dyel de Vaudroques to act in his place until he reached the age of 20. Vauderoque died in 1663 and the king appointed another family member (Jean Dyel de Clermont) in his place. On 14 April 1664 the King revoked all grants to the Compagnie des Isles de l'Amerique and all sales and transfers it had made to private parties, and on 28 May 1664 the Compagnie des Indes Occidentales was established by royal decree in its place. Du Parquet's heirs were forced to sell Martinique and Saint Lucia to the new company on 14 August 1665.

== Sources ==
- Anderson, Susan Heller; Brunetti, Cosimo (1969), "Cosimo Brunetti Three Relations of the West Indies in 1659-1660", Transactions of the American Philosophical Society, 59 (6), American Philosophical Society: 1, doi:10.2307/1006089, JSTOR 1006089
- Biographie : Jacques Dyel du Parquet (1606-1658) (in French), Bourses des Voyages
- Boucher, Philip P. (1982), "Shadows in the Past: France and Guiana, 1655-57", Proceedings of the Meeting of the French Colonial Historical Society, 6/7, Michigan State University Press: 13–26, JSTOR 42952104
- Boucher, Philip P. (29 December 2010), France and the American Tropics to 1700: Tropics of Discontent?, JHU Press, ISBN 978-1-4214-0202-4
- Dubé, Jean-Claude (28 April 2005), The Chevalier de Montmagny: First Governor of New France, University of Ottawa Press, ISBN 978-0-7766-1705-3
- Favre, Jean Hervé, "Jacques DYEL de VAUDROQUE du PARQUET", Geneanet (in French)
- Guérin, Léon (1891), "The Foundation of the French Power in the West Indies - 1625-1664", Timehri, translated from Les Navigateurs Français by Mrs. George Dawson, Royal Agricultural and Commercial Society, JSTOR 60231068
- Jesse, C. (December 1967), "SOLD FOR A SONG: Du Parquet Buys St. Lucia, Together with Martinique, Grenada, the Grenadines, In A.D. 1650, for £1660 Sterling", Caribbean Quarterly, 13 (4), Taylor & Francis, Ltd.: 44–52, JSTOR 40653043
- Margry, Pierre (1863), Origines transatlantiques: Belain d'Esnambuc et les Normands aux Antilles, d'après des documents nouvellement retrouvés (in French), A. Faure
- Roget, Jacques Petitjean (2000), Documents (in French), Desormeaux Books, ISBN 978-2-85275-031-9
- Steele, Beverley A. (2003), Grenada. A History of its People, Macmillan Publishers Limited, ISBN 0-333-93053-3
