= Compagnie de Saint-Christophe =

Colonial company

The Compagnie de Saint-Christophe was a company created and chartered by French adventurers to exploit the island of Saint-Christophe, the present-day Saint Kitts and Nevis. In 1625, a French adventurer, Pierre Bélain sieur d'Esnambuc, landed on Saint-Christophe with a band of adventurers and some slaves. Returning to France, in 1626 he applied for and received a charter from Cardinal Richelieu to create the Compagnie de Saint-Christophe. Richelieu was a major stockholder in the company, contributing some 10,000 livres out of the company's capital stock of 45,000 livres. The company was not very successful. In 1635 Richelieu directed his councilor François Fouquet to reorganize the company under the new name Compagnie des Îles de l'Amérique ('Company of the American Islands') and with a charge to colonize Sainte-Christophe, Martinique and Guadeloupe.

On 15 September 1635, d'Esnambuc landed in the harbour of St. Pierre with 150 French settlers after being driven off Saint-Christophe by the English. He claimed Martinique for King Louis XIII and the Compagnie des Îles de l'Amérique, establishing the first European settlement at Fort Saint-Pierre (now St. Pierre). His nephew, Jacques Dyel du Parquet, assisted d'Esnambuc and in 1637 became he governor of the island.

== See also ==
- List of chartered companies
- List of French colonial trading companies

== Sources ==
- Bonnassieux, Pierre (1892). Les grandes compagnies de commerce: étude pour servir à l'histoire de la colonisation [The grand companies of commerce: A study of their use in the history of colonization] (in French). Paris: E. Plon, Nourrit et Cie.
