= Company of the American Islands =

French charted company (1634–1651)

The Company of the American Islands (French: Compagnie des Îles de l'Amérique) was a French chartered company that in 1635 took over the administration of the French portion of Saint-Christophe island (Saint Kitts) from the Compagnie de Saint-Christophe which was the only French settlement in the Caribbean at that time and was mandated to actively colonise other islands.

== Islands settled ==
The islands settled for France under the direction of the Compagnie des Îles de l'Amérique before it was dissolved in 1651 were:

- Dominica (1632), formerly as Compagnie de Saint-Christophe
- Guadeloupe (28 June 1635 to 1649)
- Martinique (15 September 1635 to 27 September 1650)
- St. Lucia (1643 to 27 September 1650)
- St. Martin (23 March 1648)
- St. Barts (1648)
- Grenada (17 March 1649 to 27 September 1650)
- St. Croix (1650)

== History ==
In 1635, France's Cardinal Richelieu charged François Fouquet, the head of a small group of his councilors, with revitalizing the less than dynamic Compagnie de Saint-Christophe in which the Cardinal was a shareholder. Fouquet did so, renaming the company, "Compagnie des Îles de l'Amérique". The company was charged with developing the islands of the Antilles, including converting their inhabitants to Catholicism.

On 15 September 1635, Pierre Belain d'Esnambuc, French governor of the island of St. Kitts, landed in the harbour of St. Pierre, Martinique with 150 French settlers after being driven off St. Kitts by the English. D'Esnambuc claimed Martinique for the French King Louis XIII and the French "Compagnie des Îles de l'Amérique" (Company of the American Islands), and established the first European settlement at Fort Saint-Pierre (now St. Pierre) under governor Jean Dupont. D'Esnambuc died prematurely in 1636, leaving the company and Martinique in the hands of his nephew, Du Parquet. In 1637, his nephew Jacques Dyel du Parquet became governor of the island. Du Parquet proceeded to colonize Martinique, established the first settlement in Saint Lucia in 1643, and headed an expedition that established a French settlement in Grenada in 1649.

In 1642, the company received a twenty-year extension of its charter. The King would name the Governor General of the company, and the company the Governors of the various islands. However, by the late 1640s, in France Mazarin had little interest in colonial affairs and the company languished. In 1651, it dissolved itself, selling its exploitation rights to various parties. The du Paquet family bought Martinique, Grenada, and Saint Lucia for 60,000 livres. The sieur d'Houël bought Guadeloupe, Marie-Galante, La Desirade, and the Saintes.

Phillippe de Longvilliers de Poincy (1584–1660) was a French nobleman and Bailiff Grand Cross of the Knights of Malta. He governed the island of Saint Christopher from 1639 to his death in 1660, first under the Compagnie des Îles de l'Amérique and later under the Knights of Malta themselves. Poincy was the key figure in the Hospitaller colonization of the Americas. The Knights of Malta bought Saint-Christophe, Saint Croix, Saint Barthélemy, and Saint Martin. In 1665, the Knights sold the islands they had acquired to the newly formed (1664) Compagnie des Indes occidentales.

== See also ==
- Virginia Company
- Compagnie de Saint-Christophe
- List of French colonial trading companies
- List of chartered companies

== Sources ==
- WorldStatesmen- see each relevant island state
