= Charles Houël du Petit Pré =

French governor of Guadeloupe from 1643 to 1664

Charles Houël du Petit Pré (French pronunciation: [ʃaʁl wɛl dy pəti pʁe]; 1616 – 22 April 1682) was a French governor of Guadeloupe from 1643 to 1664. He was also a knight and lord.

He became, by a royal proclamation dated August 1645, the island's first judicial officer. He was named Marquis de Guadeloupe by Louis XIV.

On 4 September 1649, Charles Houël, in partnership with his brother-in-law John Boisseret Herblay, bought the bankrupt Compagnie Guadeloupe, Marie-Galante, La Désirade and Les Saintes for 60,000 books of pétun (tobacco) and was committed to deliver 600 pounds of sugar per year. In order to secure the site and solidify a grip on the population, he built Fort Saint-Charles (Fort Delgrès) in 1650.

Despite the 1640 peace treaty between native Kalina Carib people and France, clashes continued. On 31 March 1660, Charles Houël signed a treaty with the Caribbean, who abandoned the majority of the island to the French and retreated to the island of Dominica. However, a small number of Carib people took refuge north and east of Grande-Terre (pointes de la Grande-Vigie et des Châteaux, Anse-Bertrand).

Charles Houël founded the town of Basse-Terre in 1649. He gave his name to Houëlmont, one of the highest mounts in the Caribbean.

Under Jean-Baptiste Colbert in August 1664, the French West India Company had a monopoly on the exploitation of sugar islands. A main task was the acquisition of the island of Guadeloupe to be led under Houël to re-establish the royal authority.

Charles Houël was also Lord of Varennes, Lord of Petit-Pré, Knight and Baron Morainville.

== Titles held ==
Government offices
Preceded by Jean Soulon sieur de Sabouïlly	Governor General of Guadeloupe; 1643–1664	Succeeded by Charles Auger
