= French West India Company =

French trading company

The French West India Company (French: Compagnie française des Indes occidentales) was a trading company of the Kingdom of France founded in May 1664 and eventually closed in late 1674. The brainchild of King Louis XIV's First Minister Jean-Baptiste Colbert, the company was part of an ambitious strategy to compete with the colonial ventures of the Dutch Republic on a global stage, but did not survive the turmoil associated with the Franco-Dutch War in the early 1670s. In Africa, it was succeeded by the Compagnie du Sénégal, and by private traders' operations in America.

== Inception ==
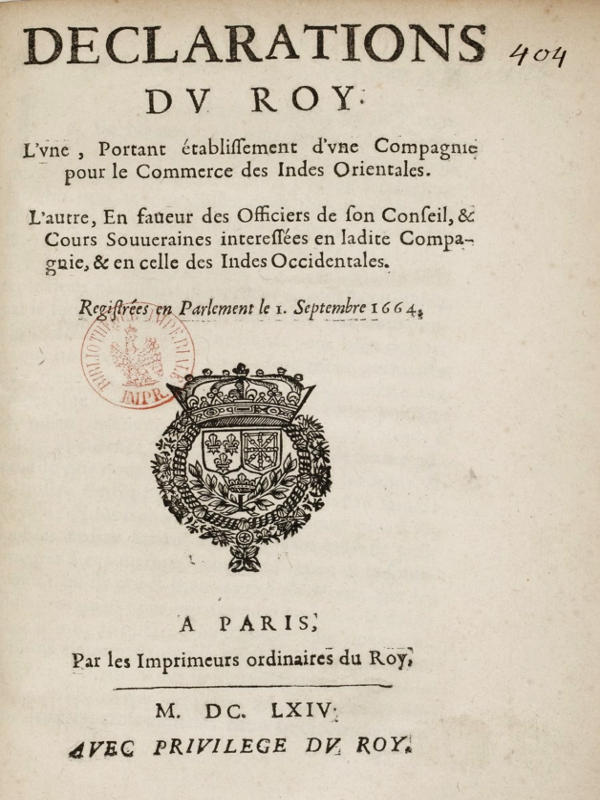
Declaration establishing a company for trade with the West Indies, 1664

On 28 May 1664 the Conseil du Roi created the West India Company and gave it a monopoly on commercial exchanges between France and "... all lands of our obedience in North and South America and the islands of America" as well as in French trading posts on the coast of Africa from Cape Verde to the Cape of Good Hope. It was primarily intended to reclaim the profits and geopolitical advantages of long-distance trade for France, as well as developing the maritime and shipbuilding industries and the activity of French ports.

At its foundation, the company benefited from a large-scale commitment of state financial resources. The King subscribed for two million French livres to its initial capital, against only 1.3 million from private-sector subscribers. Moreover, the state committed to finance the company's losses during its first four years of activity and granted it subsidies indexed on its trade volume.

The company's operational base on the French mainland was initially in Le Havre. Using the large initial capital of the company, in less than six months 45 vessels were equipped and sailed to the various places in the company's grant.

== French Canada ==
In 1665 the company obtained the Regiment Carignan-Salières to provide security against Iroquois attacks, and contributed to the settlement of the colony with the arrival of 1200 men from the Dauphiné, Liguria, Piedmont and Savoy. In 1666, Jean Talon organized the first census, counting 3215 inhabitants. The population of the colony grew to 6700 inhabitants in 1672, as a result of policies encouraging marriage and fertility. In 1667, several tribes of Iroquois, the Mohawks and Oneidas, agreed to make peace.

Charles Aubert de La Chesnaye, fur trader in Tadoussac between 1663 and 1666, was appointed general clerk of the company from 1666 to 1669, when he left the company for logging in Lac-Saint-Jean, a break and a long stay in La Rochelle, which allows him to establish business relations with several European countries and owning several vessels.

Upon his return to Canada Charles Aubert de La Chesnaye obtained shortly after the dissolution of the company, from 1675 and until 1681, the rights of the firm of the Company of the West and his friend Jean Oudiette, and holding the monopoly of beaver pelts, then Canada's main export. In 1672, Jean Talon granted him, with two other partners, the lordship of Percé to serve as a port for fishing boats. He received the seigniory of Riviere-du-Loup December 23, 1673. Chesnaye also bought half the fiefs of St. Francis and St. John (1677), the lordships of the park east of Rivière-du-Loup (1675), and Hare Island (1677).

== French Caribbean ==
Tobacco plantations were highly developed in other French colonies. The company got a monopoly on the slave trade from Senegal, which since 1658 belonged to the Company of Cape Verde and Senegal. In 1666 the company created two counters in Dahomey (Benin), Savi and Ouidah, which bought other tropical products.

The company faced the interests of the French settlers in the Caribbean, who were engaged in smuggling with the Dutch. Its commercial monopoly led to the resale price of sugar becoming prohibitive compared to sugarcane produced and refined in Barbados and Jamaica.

French sugar planters complained and accused the company of not delivering enough slaves, while neighboring islands controlled by other European powers had imported slaves on a large scale from the early 1670s.

In 1665, the company acquired Saint Croix from the Knights of Malta (a vassal state of the Kingdom of Sicily) who had ruled the island in the name of Louis XIV since 1651. The colony was evacuated to San Domingo in 1695, when France battled the English and Dutch in the War of the Grand Alliance. The island then lay uninhabited and abandoned for another 38 years when it was sold to the Danish West India Company.

== Africa ==
In 1669, Colbert and his entourage prepared a secret plan to seize Dutch fortified trading posts on the Gold Coast. Several reconnaissance missions were organized. From November 1670 to December 1671, for example, Colbert sent the ship Le Tourbillon, commanded by Captain Louis de Hally with engineer Louis Ancelin Gémozac. The plan was stillborn, however, and the attention of Colbert and the King soon turns to the Dutch War. Nevertheless, durable diplomatic relations were established with the African states of the Gold Coast.

== Demise ==
By 1670, Colbert claimed that the company had succeeded in its developmental aim of stimulating private-sector commercial navigation to French America. During the Franco-Dutch War, the company came under financial hardship. It had to borrow large sums and to alienate its exclusive privilege for the coasts of Guinea. The company's liquidation started in January 1672, and its monopoly was revoked in December 1674, upon which the French state took direct control of its American possessions.

== See also ==
- Charles Bazire
- Company of One Hundred Associates and Company of Habitants, predecessor ventures in Canada
- Company of the American Islands, predecessor venture in the Caribbean
- Compagnie de la France équinoxiale, predecessor venture in South America
- Dutch West India Company
- List of French colonial trading companies
- List of chartered companies
