= List of years in Saint Kitts and Nevis =

This is a list of the individual Saint Kitts and Nevis year pages.

== Twenty-first century ==
2020s
2020
2021
2022
2023
2024
2025
2026

2010s
2010
2011
2012
2013
2014
2015
2016
2017
2018
2019

2000s
2000
2001
2002
2003
2004
2005
2006
2007
2008
2009

== Twentieth century ==
1990s
1990
1991
1992
1993
1994
1995
1996
1997
1998
1999

1980s
1983
1984
1985
1986
1987
1988
1989

== See also ==
- History of Saint Kitts and Nevis
