= 2026 in Saint Kitts and Nevis =

- Decades: 2000s; 2010s; 2020s
- See also: Other events of 2026; Timeline of Kittitian and Nevisian history

Events from the year 2026 in Saint Kitts and Nevis

== Incumbents ==
- Monarch: Charles III
- Governor-General: Marcella Liburd
- Prime Minister: Terrance Drew
- Speaker: Lanien Blanchette

== Events ==
- 1 June — A Chinese cruise ship passenger who went missing on 27 May while hiking is found dead on Mount Liamuiga.
- 31 August 2026 — Terrance Drew is hospitalised.

== Holidays ==
- 1 January – New Year's Day
- 2 January – Carnival Day
- 3 April – Good Friday
- 6 April – Easter Monday
- 4 May – Labour Day
- 25 May – Whit Monday
- 3 August – Culturama Day
- 4 August – Emancipation Day
- 16 September – National Heroes' Day
- 19–21 September – Independence Day
- 25 December – Christmas Day
- 26 December – Boxing Day

== See also ==
- Politics of Saint Kitts and Nevis
- 2026 Atlantic hurricane season
- 2026 in the Caribbean
