= 2022 in Saint Kitts and Nevis =

- Decades: 2000s; 2010s; 2020s
- See also: Other events of 2022; Timeline of Kittitian and Nevisian history

Events from the year 2022 in Saint Kitts and Nevis

== Incumbents ==
- Monarch: Elizabeth II (until September 8); then Charles III
- Governor-General: Tapley Seaton
- Prime Minister: Timothy Harris (until August 6); Terrance Drew onwards
- Speaker: Anthony Michael Perkins

== Events ==
Ongoing: COVID-19 pandemic in Saint Kitts and Nevis

- 1 January – 2022 New Year Honours
- 5 August – 2022 Saint Kitts and Nevis general election: The opposition Saint Kitts and Nevis Labour Party, led by Terrance Drew, wins the snap general election to the National Assembly. Drew becomes the prime minister-elect.
- 6 August – Terrance Drew is sworn in as prime minister of Saint Kitts and Nevis.
- 8 September – Accession of Charles III as King of Saint Kitts and Nevis following the death of Queen Elizabeth II.
- 19 September – Minister of Foreign Affairs and former Prime Minister Denzil Douglas attends the state funeral of Queen Elizabeth II in the United Kingdom.

== Deaths ==
- September 8 – Elizabeth II, Queen of Saint Kitts and Nevis (born 1926)
