= 2015 in Saint Kitts and Nevis =

- Decades: 1990s; 2000s; 2010s; 2020s
- See also: Other events of 2015; Timeline of Kittitian and Nevisian history

The following lists events that happened during 2015 in Saint Kitts and Nevis.

== Incumbents ==
- Monarch: Elizabeth II
- Governor General: Edmund Lawrence (until 19 May), Samuel Weymouth Tapley Seaton (acting) (starting 20 May)
- Prime Minister: Denzil Douglas (until 18 February), Timothy Harris (starting 18 February)

== Events ==
=== February ===
- 16 February - Voters in Saint Kitts and Nevis go to the polls for a national election with the governing Labour Party led by Prime Minister Denzil Douglas seeking a fifth term. The opposition Team Unity, an alliance of three opposition parties led by former foreign minister Timothy Harris, wins the election, with Douglas conceding defeat on February 17.
