= 2021 in Saint Kitts and Nevis =

- Decades: 2000s; 2010s; 2020s
- See also: Other events of 2021; Timeline of Kittitian and Nevisian history

Events from the year 2021 in Saint Kitts and Nevis

== Incumbents ==
- Monarch: Elizabeth II
- Governor-General: Tapley Seaton
- Prime Minister: Timothy Harris
- Speaker: Anthony Michael Perkins

== Events ==
Ongoing: COVID-19 pandemic in Saint Kitts and Nevis

- 1 January – 2021 New Year Honours
- 23 July – 8 August: Saint Kitts and Nevis at the 2020 Summer Olympics
- 25 November – 5 December: Saint Kitts and Nevis at the 2021 Junior Pan American Games
