= 2020 in Saint Kitts and Nevis =

- Decades: 2000s; 2010s; 2020s
- See also: Other events of 2020; Timeline of Kittitian and Nevisian history

Events from the year 2020 in Saint Kitts and Nevis

== Incumbents ==
- Monarch: Elizabeth II
- Governor-General: Tapley Seaton
- Prime Minister: Timothy Harris
- Speaker: Anthony Michael Perkins

== Events ==
Ongoing: COVID-19 pandemic in Saint Kitts and Nevis

- 1 January – 2020 New Year Honours
- 24 March – A 21-year-old male and a 57-year-old female who had arrived in the federation from New York City became the first two confirmed cases of COVID-19.
- 31 March – A full lockdown goes into effect due to the rising COVID-19 cases.
- 19 May – The country is declared COVID free after all cases had recovered.
- 5 June – 2020 Saint Kitts and Nevis general election: The ruling coalition, Team Unity consisting of PAM, CCM and PLP, won a landslide victory with nine out of the eleven directly elected deputies, and netting a combined 54.85% of the vote.

== Deaths ==
- 24 January – Kennedy Isles, 28, Saint Kitts and Nevis footballer
