= 2023 in Saint Kitts and Nevis =

- Decades: 2000s; 2010s; 2020s
- See also: Other events of 2023; Timeline of Kittitian and Nevisian history

Events from the year 2023 in Saint Kitts and Nevis

== Incumbents ==
- Monarch: Charles III
- Governor-General: Tapley Seaton (until February 1), Marcella Liburd (starting February 1)
- Prime Minister: Terrance Drew
- Speaker: Lanien Blanchette

== Events ==
Ongoing: COVID-19 pandemic in Saint Kitts and Nevis

- 28 March – Three people are killed, thirteen others are missing and 14 are rescued after a boat carrying Cameroonian migrants capsizes near Saint Kitts, Saint Kitts and Nevis.
- 6 May – Coronation of Charles III as King of Saint Kitts and Nevis and the other Commonwealth realms. Governor-General Dame Marcella Liburd, Prime Minister Terrance Drew and Premier of Nevis Mark Brantley attend the ceremony in London.

== Deaths ==
- 29 June: Sir Tapley Seaton, 72, politician, governor-general (2015–2023).
