= 2017 in Saint Kitts and Nevis =

- Decades: 1990s; 2000s; 2010s; 2020s
- See also: Other events of 2017; Timeline of Kittitian and Nevisian history

Events from the year 2017 in Saint Kitts and Nevis

== Incumbents ==
- Monarch: Elizabeth II
- Governor-General: Tapley Seaton
- Prime Minister: Timothy Harris
- Speaker: Anthony Michael Perkins

== Events ==
- 6 September – Hurricane Irma hits St Kitts and Nevis.

== Deaths ==
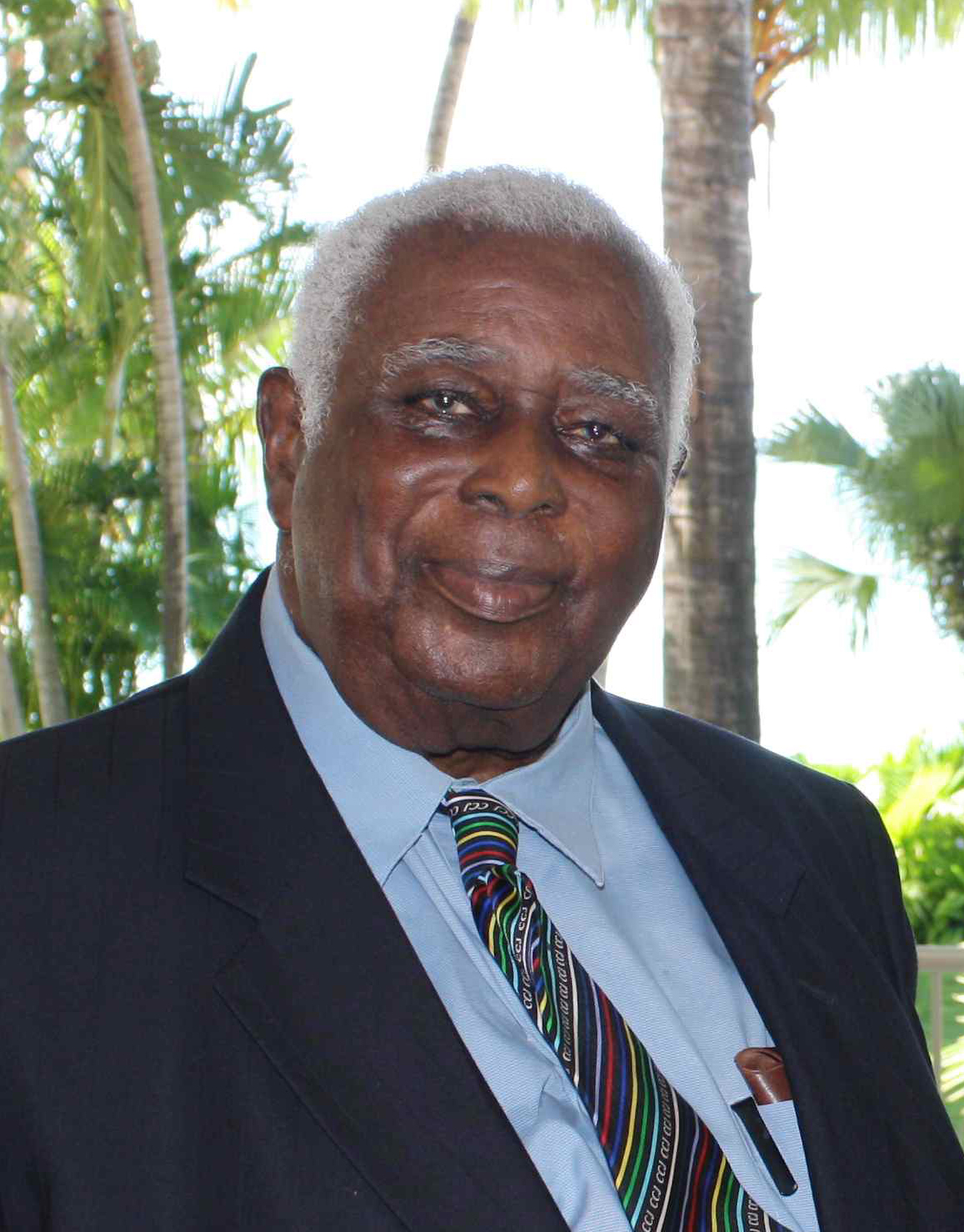
Sir Cuthbert Sebastian

- 12 March – Probyn Inniss, governor (b. 1936).
- 25 March – Sir Cuthbert Sebastian, politician, Governor-General 1996–2013 (b. 1921 ).
- 31 December – Auckland Hector, cricketer (b. 1945).
