= 2025 in Saint Kitts and Nevis =

- Decades: 2000s; 2010s; 2020s
- See also: Other events of 2025; Timeline of Kittitian and Nevisian history

Events from the year 2025 in Saint Kitts and Nevis

== Incumbents ==
- Monarch: Charles III
- Governor-General: Marcella Liburd
- Prime Minister: Terrance Drew
- Speaker: Lanien Blanchette

== Events ==
- 29 January – The bodies of 19 people are found in an abandoned fishing vessel off the coast of Nevis.
- 11 April – Saint Kitts and Nevis inks a USD $13 million loan agreement with Taiwan.

== Holidays ==
- 1 January – New Year's Day
- 2 January – Carnival Day
- 18 April – Good Friday
- 21 April – Easter Monday
- 5 May – Labour Day
- 9 June – Whit Monday
- 4 August – Emancipation Day
- 5 August – Culturama Day
- 16 September – National Heroes' Day
- 19 September – Independence Day
- 25 December – Christmas Day
- 26 December – Boxing Day

== Deaths ==
- 7 September – Sir Edmund Wickham Lawrence, 93, governor-general (2013–2015).

== See also ==
- Politics of Saint Kitts and Nevis
- 2025 Atlantic hurricane season
- 2025 in the Caribbean
