= Monarchy of Saint Kitts and Nevis =

King of Saint Kitts and Nevis
- Federal
- Coat of arms of Saint Kitts and Nevis

Incumbent
- Charles III since 8 September 2022

Details
- Style: His Majesty
- Heir apparent: William, Prince of Wales
- First monarch: Elizabeth II
- Formed: 19 September 1983

The monarchy of Saint Kitts and Nevis is a system of government in which a hereditary monarch is the sovereign and head of state of Saint Kitts and Nevis. The current monarch of Saint Kitts and Nevis, since 8 September 2022, is King Charles III. As sovereign, he is the personal embodiment of the Crown of Saint Kitts and Nevis. Although the person of the sovereign is equally shared with 14 other independent countries within the Commonwealth of Nations, each country's monarchy is separate and legally distinct. As a result, the current monarch is officially titled King of Saint Christopher and Nevis and, in this capacity, he and other members of the royal family undertake public and private functions domestically and abroad as representatives of Saint Kitts and Nevis. However, the King is the only member of the royal family with any constitutional role.

All executive authority is vested in the monarch, and royal assent is required for the National Assembly of Saint Kitts and Nevis to enact laws and for letters patent and Orders in Council to have legal effect. Most of the powers are exercised by the elected members of parliament, the ministers of the Crown generally drawn from amongst them, and the judges and justices of the peace. Other powers vested in the monarch, such as dismissal of a prime minister, are significant but are treated only as reserve powers and as an important security part of the role of the monarchy.

The Crown today primarily functions as a guarantor of continuous and stable governance and a nonpartisan safeguard against the abuse of power. While some powers are exercisable only by the sovereign, most of the monarch's operational and ceremonial duties are exercised by his representative, the governor-general of Saint Kitts and Nevis.

== Origins ==
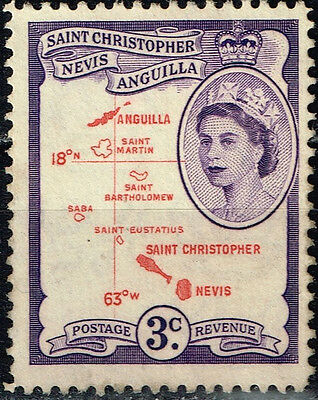
1956 postage stamp

Sir Thomas Warner arrived from England in 1623, and established the first successful English colony in the West Indies at Old Road on the west coast. The French first arrived on the island in 1625 and established a colony in 1627 under Pierre Belain d'Esnambuc. Divided during the 17th century between French and English colonists, Saint Kitts was given to Britain by the Treaty of Utrecht of April 1713 and remained in British possession despite the capture of Brimstone Hill in 1782 by the French. The island was restored to Britain by the Peace of Paris treaty signed in 1783.

Nevis was settled by the English in 1628 and soon became one of the most prosperous of the Antilles. Although it suffered from French and Spanish attacks in the 17th and 18th centuries, it maintained a sound economic position until the mid-19th century.

Saint Kitts and Nevis, along with Anguilla, were federated in 1882. After a brief period as part of the West Indies Federation, the islands became an associated state with full internal autonomy in 1967. Both Nevis and Anguilla were unhappy at St Kitts's domination of the federation, with Anguilla unilaterally declaring independence in 1967. After unsuccessful negotiations, the Anguilla Act of July 1971 placed Anguilla directly under British control. In 1976, Anguilla was granted a constitution, and its union with Saint Kitts and Nevis was formally severed in 1980.

A constitutional conference was held in London in 1982. In spite of disagreement over special provisions for Nevis, Saint Kitts and Nevis achieved full independence on 19 September 1983, as an independent realm within the Commonwealth, with Queen Elizabeth II as the head of state and Queen of Saint Kitts and Nevis.

Princess Margaret represented the Queen at the independence celebrations. She was greeted with a 21-gun salute at Golden Rock airport, and a crowd of thousands cheered the Princess. Following the flag-raising ceremony after midnight, the Princess read a message from her sister, the Queen, and formally handed over the constitutional volumes to the Prime-Minister designate, Kennedy Simmonds.

== The Crown of Saint Kitts and Nevis and its aspects ==
Saint Kitts and Nevis is one of fifteen independent nations, known as Commonwealth realms, which shares its sovereign with other monarchies in the Commonwealth of Nations, with the monarch's relationship with Saint Kitts and Nevis completely independent from his position as monarch of any other realm. Despite sharing the same person as their respective monarch, each of the Commonwealth realms — including Saint Kitts and Nevis — is sovereign and independent of the others. The monarch is represented by a viceroy—the governor-general of Saint Kitts and Nevis—in the country.

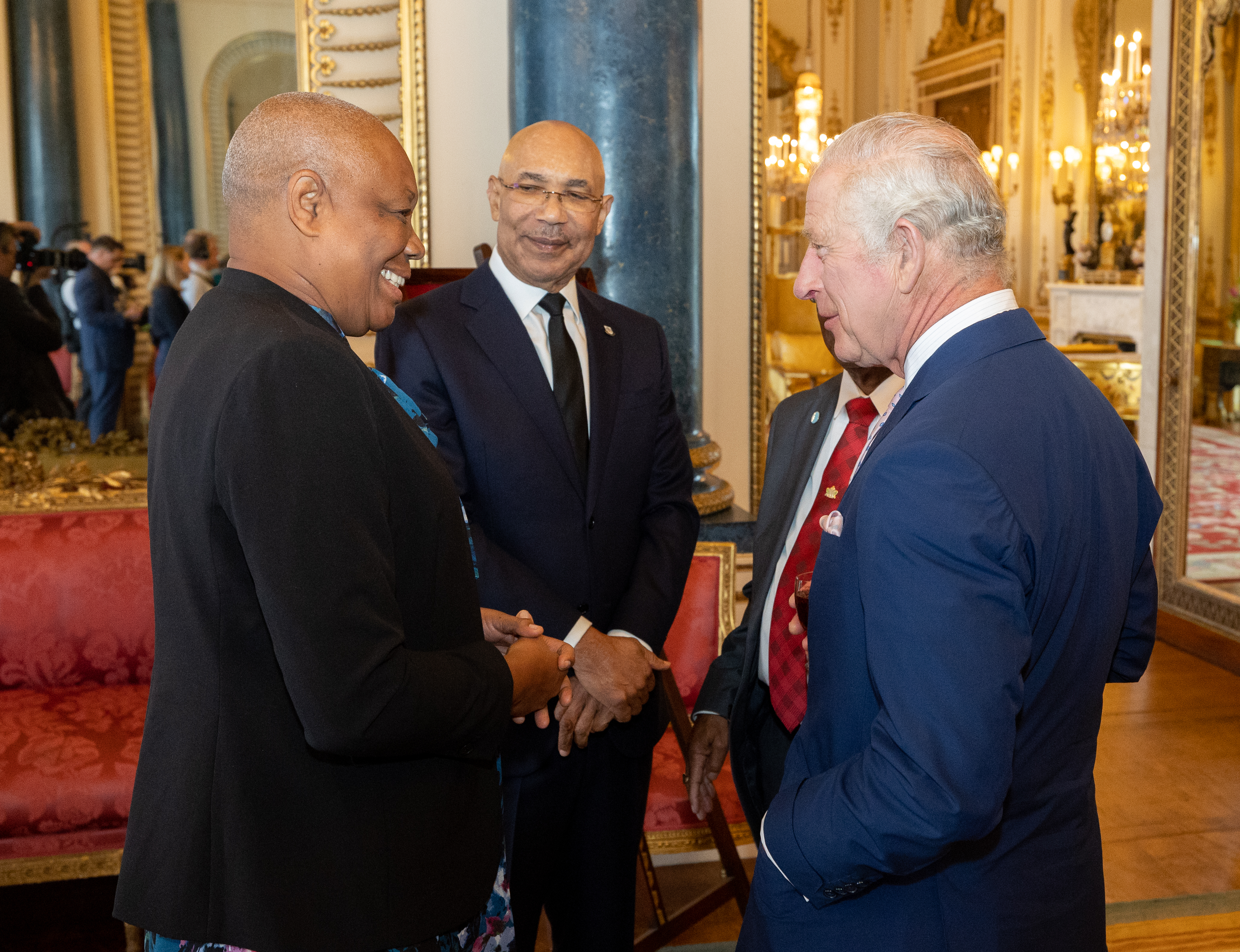
King Charles III speaking with Governor-General Dame Marcella Liburd at Buckingham Palace, 2023

Since the independence of Saint Kitts and Nevis in 1983, the pan-national Crown has had both a shared and a separate character and the sovereign's role as monarch of Saint Kitts and Nevis is distinct to their position as monarch of any other realm, including the United Kingdom. The monarchy thus ceased to be an exclusively British institution and in Saint Kitts and Nevis became a national, or "domesticated" establishment.

This division is illustrated in a number of ways: The sovereign, for example, holds a unique title in relation to Saint Kitts and Nevis and, when he is acting in public specifically as a representative of the country, he uses, where possible, symbols of Saint Kitts and Nevis, including the country's national flag, unique royal symbols, and the like. Also, only Saint Kitts and Nevis government ministers can advise the sovereign on matters of the country.

In Saint Kitts and Nevis, the legal personality of the State is referred to as "His Majesty in right of Saint Christopher and Nevis", or the "Crown in right of the Government of Saint Christopher and Nevis".

=== Title ===
In Saint Christopher and Nevis, the monarch's style is: Charles the Third, by the Grace of God, King of Saint Christopher and Nevis and of His other Realms and Territories, Head of the Commonwealth.

=== Oath of allegiance ===
As the embodiment of the state, the monarch is the locus of oaths of Allegiance. This is done in reciprocation to the sovereign's Coronation Oath, wherein they promise to govern the peoples of their realms, "according to their respective laws and customs".

The oath of allegiance in Saint Kitts and Nevis is:

"I, (name), do swear that I will faithfully bear true allegiance to His Majesty King Charles the Third, His Heirs and Successors, according to law. So help me God."

=== Succession ===
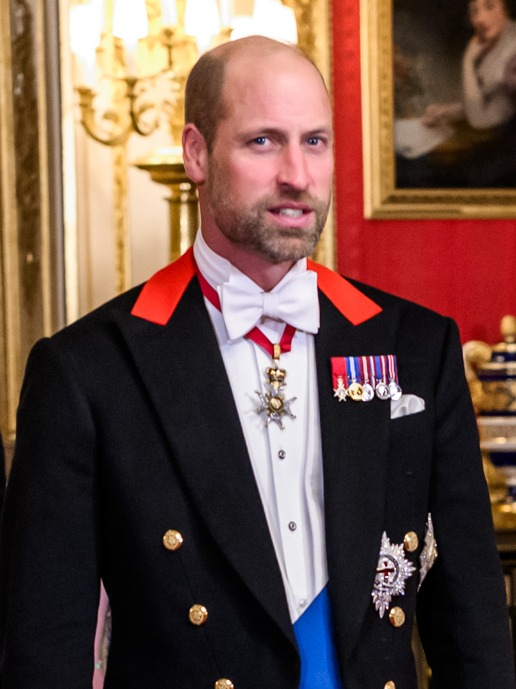
William, Prince of Wales, is the current heir apparent to the throne of Saint Kitts and Nevis

Succession is by absolute primogeniture governed by the provisions of the Succession to the Crown Act 2013, as well as the Act of Settlement 1701, and the Bill of Rights 1689. This legislation limits the succession to the natural (i.e. non-adopted), legitimate descendants of Sophia, Electress of Hanover, and stipulates that the monarch cannot be a Roman Catholic, and must be in communion with the Church of England upon ascending the throne.

Though these constitutional laws, as they apply to Saint Kitts and Nevis, still lie within the control of the British parliament, both the United Kingdom and Saint Kitts and Nevis cannot change the rules of succession without the unanimous consent of the other realms, unless explicitly leaving the shared monarchy relationship; a situation that applies identically in all the other realms, and which has been likened to a treaty amongst these countries. Saint Kitts and Nevis last indicated its consent to alteration to the line of succession in 2013, when the National Assembly passed the Succession to the Crown Act, which signified the legislature's acceptance to the British Parliament's Succession to the Crown Act 2013.

Upon a demise of the Crown (the death or abdication of a sovereign), it is customary for the accession of the new monarch to be proclaimed by the governor-general in the capital, Basseterre, after the accession. Regardless of any proclamations, the late sovereign's heir immediately and automatically succeeds, without any need for confirmation or further ceremony. An appropriate period of mourning also follows, during which flags across the country are flown at half-mast to honour the late monarch.

== Federal constitutional role ==
The Constitution of Saint Kitts and Nevis gives Saint Kitts and Nevis a parliamentary system of government under a federal constitutional monarchy, wherein the role of the monarch and governor-general is both legal and practical, but not political. The Crown is regarded as a corporation, in which several parts share the authority of the whole, with the sovereign as the person at the centre of the constitutional construct, meaning all powers of state are constitutionally reposed in the monarch. The government of Saint Kitts and Nevis is also thus formally referred to as His Majesty's Government of Saint Christopher and Nevis.

Most of the monarch's domestic duties are performed by the governor-general, appointed by the monarch on the advice of the prime minister of Saint Kitts and Nevis.

=== Executive ===
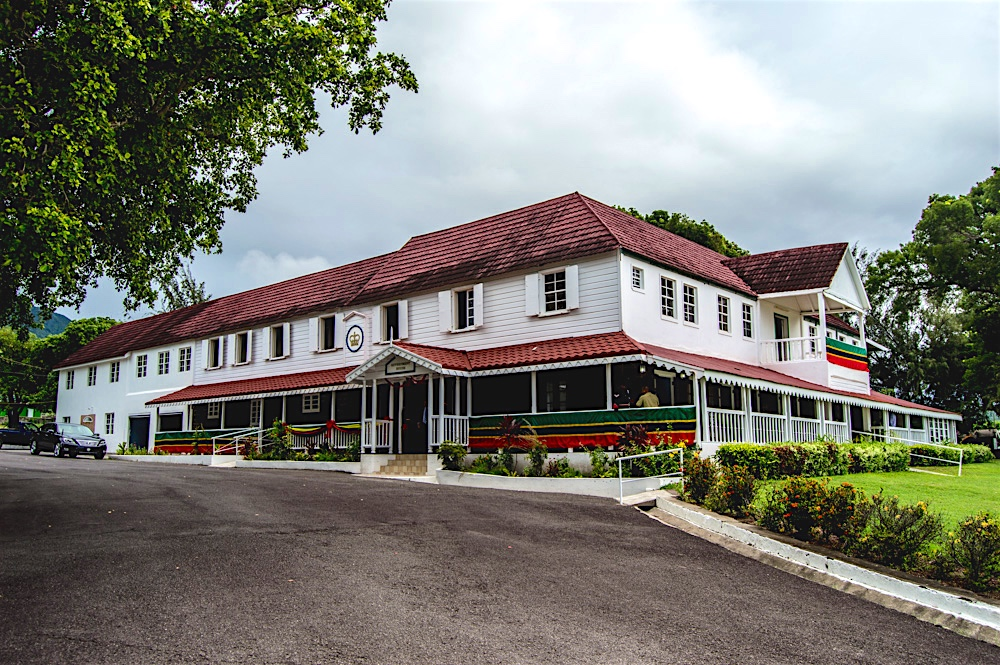
Springfield House, Basseterre, the official residence of the governor-general

One of the main duties of the Crown is to appoint a prime minister, who thereafter heads the cabinet and advises the monarch or governor-general on how to execute their executive powers over all aspects of government operations and foreign affairs. The monarch's, and thereby the viceroy's role is almost entirely symbolic and cultural, acting as a symbol of the legal authority under which all governments and agencies operate, while the Cabinet directs the use of the Royal Prerogative, which includes the privilege to declare war, maintain the King's peace, and direct the actions of the Saint Kitts and Nevis Defence Force, as well as to summon and prorogue parliament and call elections. However, the Royal Prerogative belongs to the Crown and not to any of the ministers, though it might have sometimes appeared that way, and the constitution allows the governor-general to unilaterally use these powers in relation to the dismissal of a prime minister, dissolution of parliament, and removal of a judge in exceptional, constitutional crisis situations.

There are also a few duties which are specifically performed by the monarch, such as appointing the governor-general.

The governor-general, to maintain the stability of the government of Saint Kitts and Nevis, appoints as prime minister the individual most likely to maintain the support of the National of Assembly. The governor-general additionally appoints a Cabinet, at the direction of the prime minister. The monarch is informed by his viceroy of the acceptance of the resignation of a prime minister and the swearing-in of a new prime minister and other members of the ministry, and he remains fully briefed through regular communications from his Saint Kitts and Nevis ministers.

=== Foreign affairs ===
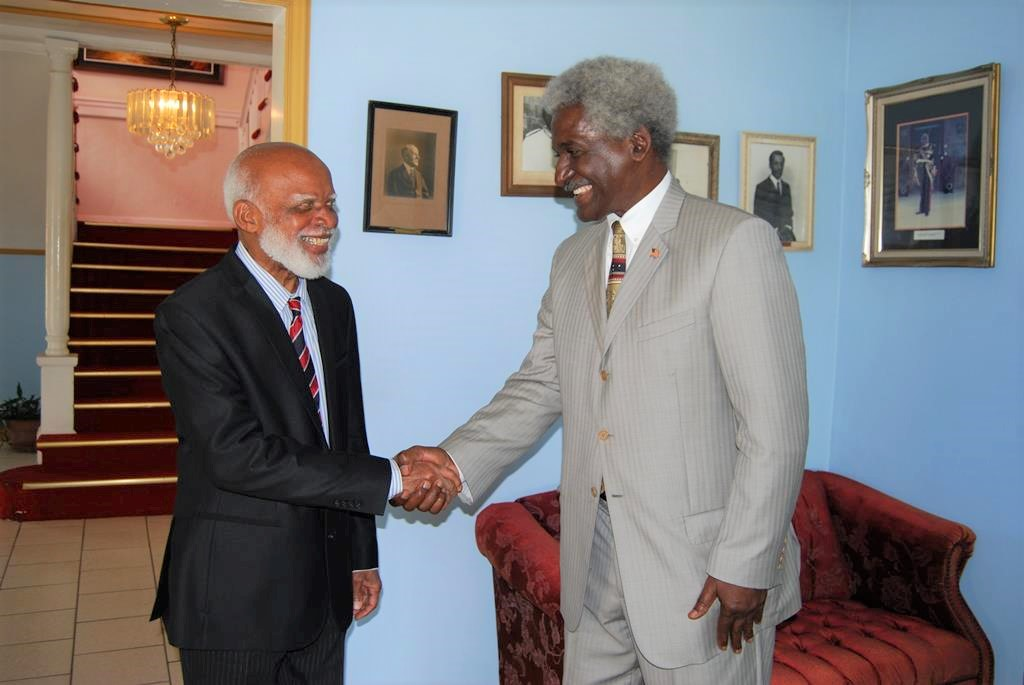
Governor-General Sir Edmund Lawrence with US Ambassador Larry Leon Palmer, 2013

The Royal Prerogative further extends to foreign affairs: the governor-general ratifies treaties, alliances, and international agreements. As with other uses of the Royal Prerogative, no parliamentary approval is required. However, a treaty cannot alter the domestic laws of Saint Kitts and Nevis; an Act of Parliament is necessary in such cases. The governor-general, on behalf of the monarch, also accredits Saint Kitts and Nevis High Commissioners and ambassadors and receives diplomats from foreign states. In addition, the issuance of passports falls under the Royal Prerogative and, as such, all Saint Kitts and Nevis passports are issued in the governor-general's name, the monarch's representative in Saint Kitts and Nevis.

=== Parliament ===
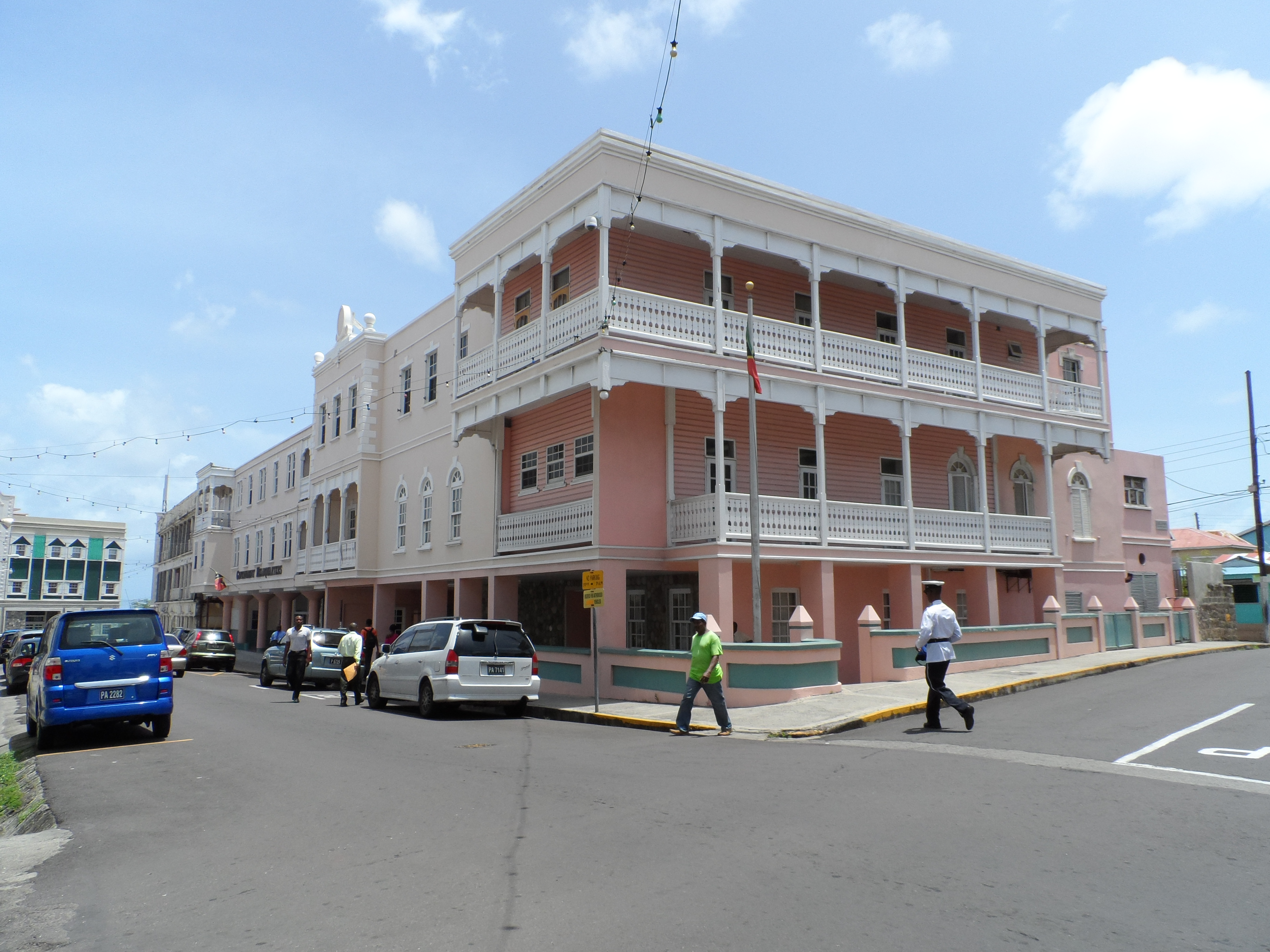
National Assembly building, Basseterre

The sovereign, along with the National Assembly, is one of the two components of the Parliament of Saint Kitts and Nevis.

Parliament meets only by royal summons and no bill becomes law without Royal Assent. Further, the constitution outlines that the governor-general alone is responsible for appointing senators. One-third of all senatorial appointments are made by the governor-general on the advice of the leader of the opposition, and others on the advice of prime minister. The viceroy additionally summons, prorogues, and dissolves parliament; after the latter, the writs for a general election are usually dropped by the governor-general at Government House, Basseterre.

The new parliamentary session is marked by the Opening of the National Assembly, during which the monarch or governor-general reads the Speech from the Throne.

All laws in Saint Kitts and Nevis are enacted only with the viceroy's granting of Royal Assent in the monarch's name. Thus, bills begin with the phrase: "Be it enacted by the King's Most Excellent Majesty, by and with the advice and consent of the National Assembly of Saint Christopher Nevis and by the authority of the same as follows". The Royal Assent, and proclamation, are required for all acts of parliament, usually granted or withheld by the governor-general, with the Public Seal of Saint Christopher and Nevis.

=== Courts ===
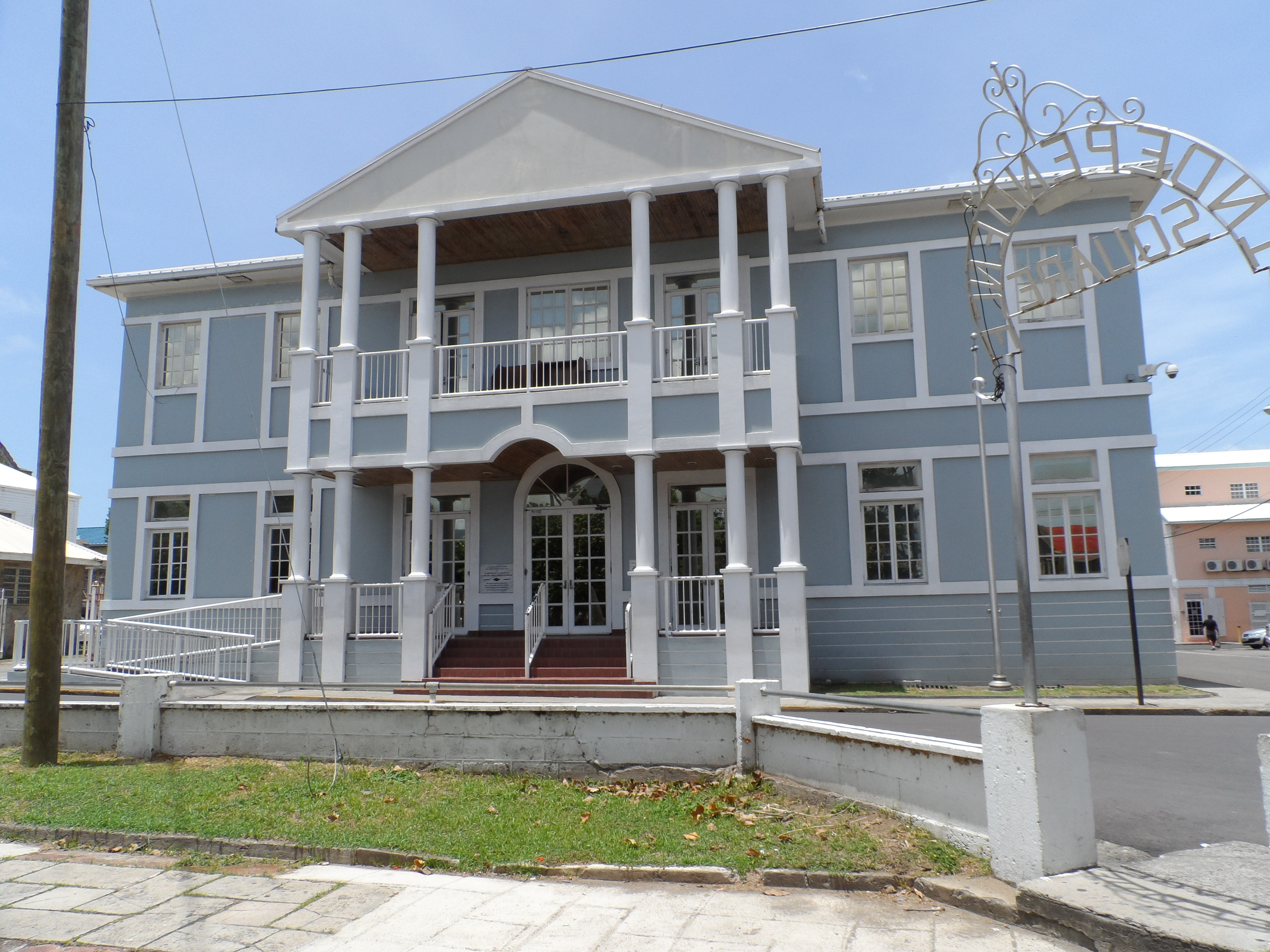
Sir Lee L. Moore Judicial and Legal Services Complex, Basseterre

The Sovereign is deemed the "fount of justice," and is responsible for rendering justice for all subjects. The Sovereign does not personally rule in judicial cases; instead, judicial functions are performed in his or her name. In Saint Kitts and Nevis, criminal offences are legally deemed to be offences against the sovereign, and proceedings for indictable offences are brought in the sovereign's name in the form of The King [or Queen] versus [Name]. Hence, the common law holds that the sovereign "can do no wrong"; the monarch cannot be prosecuted in his or her own courts for criminal offences.

The highest court of appeal for Saint Kitts and Nevis is the Judicial Committee of the King's Privy Council.

The governor-general, on behalf of the monarch of Saint Kitts and Nevis, can also grant immunity from prosecution, exercise the royal prerogative of mercy, and pardon offences against the Crown, either before, during, or after a trial. The exercise of the 'Prerogative of mercy' to grant a pardon and the commutation of prison sentences is described in section 66 of the Constitution.

== Monarchy in Nevis ==
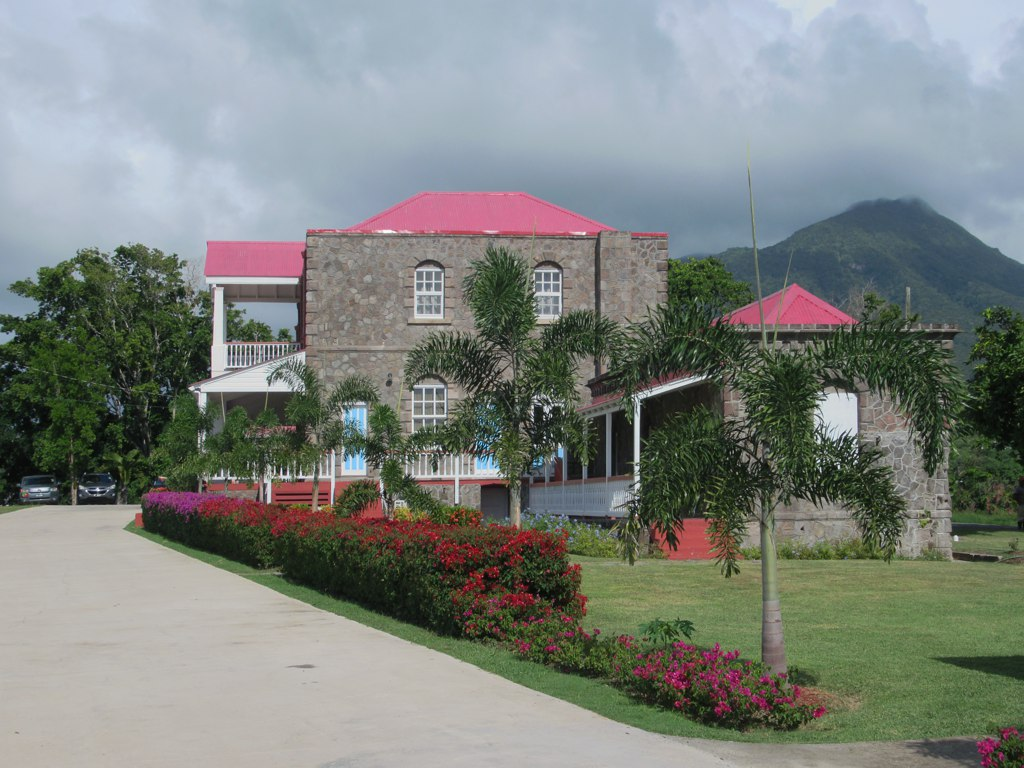
Government House, Nevis

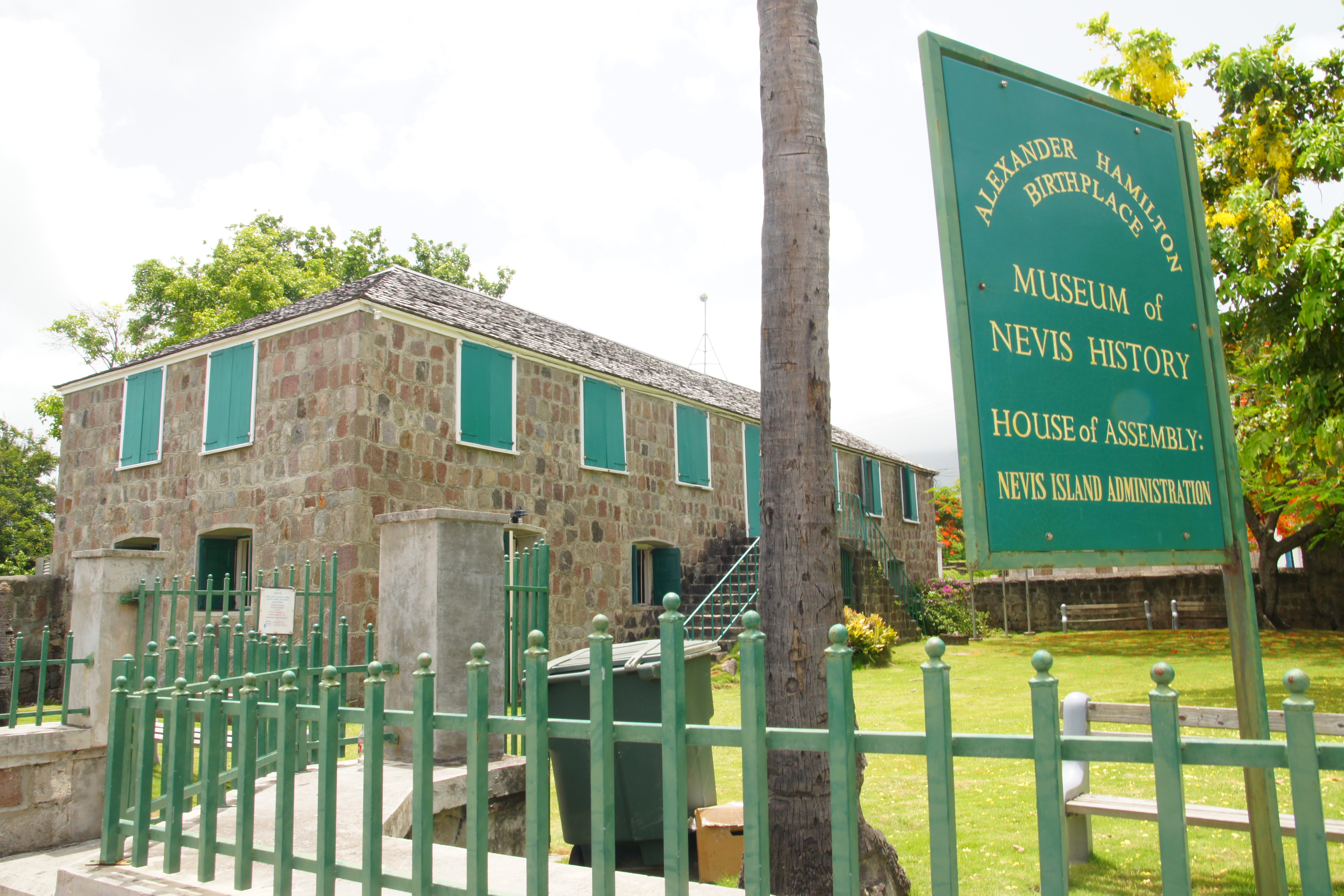
The seat of the Nevis Island Assembly

By the arrangements of the constitution of the federation, the monarchy of Saint Kitts and Nevis operates separately on the island of Nevis, and the Crown within the jurisdiction of Nevis is referred to as the Crown in right of the Nevis Island Administration.

The governor-general appoints a deputy governor-general for Nevis, who performs the functions of the vice-regal office on the island. As representative of the monarch, the deputy governor-general resides at Government House south of Charlestown, Nevis.

The monarch and the Nevis Island Assembly constitute the Nevis Island Legislature. One-third of the nominated members of the Assembly are appointed by the governor-general in accordance with the advice of the leader of the Opposition in the Assembly, and others are appointed by the governor-general in accordance with the advice of the premier of Nevis. All bills passed by the Nevis Island Assembly require Royal assent. The governor-general is also responsible for dissolving the Assembly on the advice of the premier.

The governor-general, to maintain the stability of the Nevis Island Administration, appoints as premier the individual most likely to maintain the support of the majority of the elected members of the Nevis Island Assembly. The governor-general also appoints other members of the Administration from among the members of the Assembly, acting in accordance with the advice of the premier.

The function of the Nevis Island Administration is to advise the governor-general in the government of the island of Nevis. The Administration is collectively responsible to the Assembly for any advice given to the governor-general.

== Cultural role ==
=== The Crown and Honours ===
Within the Commonwealth realms, the monarch is deemed the fount of honour. Similarly, the monarch, as Sovereign of Saint Kitts and Nevis, confers awards and honours in Saint Kitts and Nevis in his name. Most of them are often awarded on the advice of "His Majesty's Saint Christopher and Nevis Ministers".

Through the passage of the National Honours Act in 1998, Saint Kitts and Nevis established three classes of award: the Order of National Hero, the Star of Merit and the Medal of Honour. In 2005, another class of award was added, namely the Order of St Christopher and Nevis. All these honours and awards form part of "The Order of Honour, Decorations and Medals", which consists of the governor-general as President, and the secretary to the governor-general as Secretary of the Order. The National Awards Committee is responsible for submitting nominations for the candidates to the office of the prime minister, which then forwards the recommendations to the governor-general. Investitures are conducted by the governor-general at Government House.

=== The Crown and the Defence Force ===
The rank insignia of a Lieutenant-Colonel (left) and Major (right) of the Saint Kitts and Nevis Defence Force featuring the St Edward's Crown

The Crown sits at the pinnacle of the Saint Kitts and Nevis Defence Force. St Edward's Crown appears on Saint Kitts and Nevis Defence Force badges and rank insignia, which illustrates the monarchy as the locus of authority. As representative of the sovereign, the governor-general acts as commander-in-chief of the Defence Force.

The power to grant commissions in the Defence Force is vested in the monarch, and is exercised on the monarch's behalf by the governor-general.

=== The Crown and the Police Force ===
The national police force of Saint Kitts and Nevis is known as "The Royal St Christopher and Nevis Police Force".

The St. Edward's Crown appears on the Police's badges and rank insignia, which illustrates the monarchy as the locus of authority.

Every member of the Royal St Christopher and Nevis Police Force has to swear allegiance to the monarch of Saint Kitts and Nevis, on taking office. Under The Police Act, 2002, the oath of allegiance, is:

"I, (name), do swear that I will well and truly serve Our Sovereign Lord the King in the office of Special Constable in the Federation without favour or affection, malice or ill-will, and that I will cause His Majesty's peace to be preserved, and will prevent to the utmost of my power offences against the same. So help me God!"

=== Royal symbols ===
The main symbol of the monarchy of Saint Kitts and Nevis is the sovereign himself. Thus, framed portraits of him are displayed in public buildings and government offices. The monarch also appears on commemorative stamps of Saint Kitts and Nevis.

A crown is also used to illustrate the monarchy as the locus of authority, appearing on defence and police force, postal workers, prison officers rank insignia.

God Save The King is the royal anthem of Sanit Kitts and Nevis.

Under the Saint Christopher and Nevis Citizenship Act, new citizens of the country have swear allegiance to the monarch, and his heirs and successors.

The flag of governor-general of Saint Kitts and Nevis featuring the St Edward's Crown

The emblem of Royal St Christopher and Nevis Police Force featuring the Crown

The emblem of Saint Kitts and Nevis Defence Force featuring the Tudor Crown

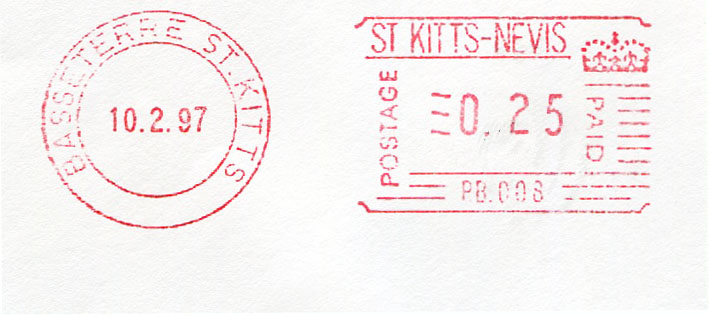
Saint Kitts and Nevis meter stamp displaying St Edward's Crown

=== Royal visits ===
Above all, I wanted to say The Queen asked me to convey her warmest greetings to you all. And I need hardly say how very touched we have been by the welcome we have received on both islands and, for my part, it has been particularly special to return to places that I have such fond memories of visiting when I first came here some forty-six years ago during my time in the Royal Navy.

— Charles, Prince of Wales, 2019

==== 20th century ====
Princess Margaret visited Saint Kitts in February 1955.

Queen Elizabeth II and her husband, the Duke of Edinburgh, visited Saint Kitts and Nevis in 1966. During their visit on 22 February, the Queen held an investiture at Government House attended by about 50 guests. Afterwards, the Queen and the Duke attended a reception, where about 700 people were present. Later, they watched a fireworks display from Basseterre Water Front. At Government House in Nevis, Chief Minister C A Paul Southwell presented a large relief map of Nevis to the Queen. Prince Charles visited in June 1973 to open the newly-restored Prince of Wales Bastion at the Brimstone Hill Fortress National Park.

Princess Margaret visited in September 1983 to represent the Queen at the independence celebrations. The Queen and her husband visited again in 1985 during which a reception was held onboard HMY Britannia.

External videos
- The Queen and Prince Philip visit St Kitts and Nevis (1985) Source: ITN Archive.

The Princess of Wales holidayed with her sons in Nevis in January 1993.

In September 1993, Prince Philip, Duke of Edinburgh visited the country as the Queen's personal representative on the occasion of 10th anniversary of independence.

==== 21st century ====
The Earl and Countess of Wessex visited in March 2012 to mark the Queen's Diamond Jubilee. The couple met with Governor-General Sir Cuthbert Sebastian, Prime Minister Denzil Douglas, and other dignitaries, watched cultural shows, and the Earl unveiled a plaque commemorating the Diamond Jubilee and officially designated the Basseterre Valley Park as the Royal Basseterre Valley Park. They also visited Brimstone Hill Fortress National Park and the children's ward of the JNF Hospital and the Children's Home before attending a state dinner and fireworks display at Port Zante.

Thank you again for your friendly Caribbean welcome. I am only here for a short time, but can safely say that the beauty and people of St Kitts and Nevis will stay with me for a very long time.

— Prince Henry of Wales, 2016

Prince Harry visited in 2016, the year of the Queen's 90th birthday. The Prince arrived on 23 November, and was welcomed by a military parade at Port Zante, and later attended a youth rally at Brimstone Hill Fortress. Here, the Prince also unveiled a Saint Kitts and Nevis dedication to the Queen's Commonwealth Canopy. Prince Harry then travelled by boat to Charlestown Pier on the neighbouring island of Nevis, where he visited a local turtle conservation initiative on Lovers Beach. In the evening, the Prince returned to Saint Kitts to attend a reception hosted by the governor-general at Government House.

The Prince of Wales and the Duchess of Cornwall visited Saint Kitts and Nevis in 2019. They arrived in Basseterre on 21 March, and met local residents. At the National Museum, they learnt more about the history of Saint Kitts and Nevis and signed a scroll to mark the Royal visit and the building's 125th anniversary. The Prince and the Duchess then travelled to the island of Nevis by boat, and received a welcome from masquerade dancers. At the Brimstone Hill Fortress National Park, the Prince learnt more about the area and see the Queen's Commonwealth Canopy. The Duchess visited Hermitage Plantation House, where she met local women, and viewed an arts and craft display. In the evening, the couple attended a reception hosted by the governor-general. During a speech, the Prince of Wales announced the creation of The Prince of Wales's Commonwealth Scholarships to mark the 70th anniversary of the modern Commonwealth and in recognition of his birthday.

== Debate ==
In September 2022, Prime Minister Terrance Drew said that his government had "set our eyes on transitioning into a republic", and in May 2023, Drew suggested that Saint Kitts and Nevis was "not totally free" whilst Charles III is the head of state. Drew said that he would begin a public consultation on becoming a republic and supported reparations for slavery.

A 2023 opinion poll found that 52% supported keeping the monarchy whilst 45% preferred Saint Kitts and Nevis to become a republic.

== List of Saint Kitts and Nevis monarchs ==
Portrait	Regnal name (Birth–Death)	Reign over Saint Kitts and Nevis		Full name	Consort	House
Portrait	Regnal name (Birth–Death)	Start	End	Full name	Consort	House
	Elizabeth II (1926–2022)	19 September 1983	8 September 2022	Elizabeth Alexandra Mary	Philip Mountbatten	Windsor
	Elizabeth II (1926–2022)	Governors-general: Sir Clement Arrindell, Sir Cuthbert Sebastian, Sir Edmund Lawrence, Sir Tapley Seaton; Prime ministers: Kennedy Simmonds, Denzil Douglas, Timothy Harris, Terrance Drew				
	Charles III (b. 1948)	8 September 2022	present	Charles Philip Arthur George	Camilla Shand	Windsor
	Charles III (b. 1948)	Governors-general: Sir Tapley Seaton, Dame Marcella Liburd; Prime ministers: Terrance Drew				

== See also ==
- Lists of office-holders
- List of prime ministers of Elizabeth II
- List of prime ministers of Charles III
- List of Commonwealth visits made by Elizabeth II
- Monarchies in the Americas
- List of monarchies
