= 2024 in Saint Kitts and Nevis =

- Decades: 2000s; 2010s; 2020s
- See also: Other events of 2024; Timeline of Kittitian and Nevisian history

Events from the year 2024 in Saint Kitts and Nevis

== Incumbents ==
- Monarch: Charles III
- Governor-General: Marcella Liburd
- Prime Minister: Terrance Drew
- Speaker: Lanien Blanchette

== Holidays ==
- 1 January - New Year's Day
- 2 January - Carnival Day
- 29 March – Good Friday
- 1 April - Easter Monday
- 1 May - Labour Day
- 20 May - Whit Monday
- 1 August – Emancipation Day
- 2 August – Culturama Day
- 16 September – National Heroes' Day
- 19 September – Independence Day
- 1 November – Independence Day
- 25 December – Christmas Day
- 26 December – Boxing Day

== See also ==
- Politics of Saint Kitts and Nevis
- 2024 Atlantic hurricane season
- 2024 in the Caribbean
