= Order of St Christopher and Nevis =

Order of Merit

Awarded by Governor-General of Saint Kitts and Nevis
- Type: National order
- Eligibility: Visiting heads of state and other representatives of nations which have substantial contributions to St Christopher and Nevis.
- Status: Currently constituted
- President: Governor-General of Saint Kitts and Nevis
- Grades: One
- Post-nominals: SCN
- Ribbon bar of the Order

The Order of St Christopher and Nevis is an Order of Merit of St. Christopher and Nevis. Instituted in 2005, it is awarded to visiting heads of state and other representatives of nations which have made substantial contributions to St Christopher and Nevis. It entitles the bearer to carry the post-nominals SCN. Recipients of this honour are styled as "The Right Excellent "and are also entitled to receive heraldic supporters. They may, furthermore, encircle their arms with a depiction of the collar.

== Recipients ==
- Tsai Ing-wen, President of Taiwan (ROC) Republic of China
