= Franklin Brand =

St Kitts and Nevis businessman and politician

Speaker of the National Assembly of Saint Kitts and Nevis
- In office May 2015 – April 2016
- Prime Minister: Timothy Harris
- Preceded by: Curtis Martin
- Succeeded by: Anthony Michael Perkins

Personal details
- Party: Concerned Citizens' Movement

Franklin Brand is a businessman and politician from Saint Kitts and Nevis who was Speaker of the National Assembly of Saint Kitts and Nevis from May 2015 to April 2016.

== Career ==
In 1997, Brand became co-owner and managing director of Island Bakeries Ltd. Before this, he had served as the Chief Statistician of the Nevis Island Administration and as a minister for tourism and business. He was a founding member of the Concerned Citizens' Movement.

In 2006, Brand was elected the president of the Saint Kitts and Nevis Chamber of Commerce. He was re-elected to the role in 2007, serving until February 2008.

Following the 2015 general election, Brand was nominated and elected as Speaker of the National Assembly of Saint Kitts and Nevis in May 2015. He succeeded Curtis Martin.

In May 2016, a government press release confirmed that Brand had resigned from the position due to health reasons, with news reports indicating he had formally resigned in late April 2016. He was succeeded by the deputy speaker, Michael Perkins.
