= Curtis Martin (politician) =

St Kitts and Nevis businessman and politician

Permanent Secretary of the Ministry of Health
- Incumbent
- Assumed office April 2024
- Prime Minister: Terrance Drew

Speaker of the National Assembly of Saint Kitts and Nevis
- In office April 2008 – January 2015
- Prime Minister: Denzil Douglas
- Preceded by: Marcella Liburd
- Succeeded by: Franklin Brand

Personal details
- Party: Saint Kitts and Nevis Labour Party

Curtis Martin is a politician from Saint Kitts and Nevis.

== Career ==
In April 2008, Martin was nominated and sworn in as the Speaker of the National Assembly of Saint Kitts and Nevis, succeeding Marcella Liburd. At the time of his appointment as Speaker, Martin was Vice President of Human Resource at Cable and Wireless.

Martin served as Speaker until January 2015 and was succeeded by Franklin Brand, who took office in April 2015.

In October 2022, Martin was appointed to the Social Security Board. In April 2024, Martin was made acting Permanent Secretary of the Ministry of Health by Prime Minister and Health Minister Terrance Drew.
