= Constitution of Saint Kitts and Nevis =

Supreme law of Saint Kitts and Nevis

The Constitution of Saint Kitts and Nevis was adopted on 23 June 1983 and took effect when the country became independent on 19 September 1983. It consists of 11 chapters and various schedules, which establish the rights, responsibilities and definition of the citizens of the federation. It also provides the form and structure of government, and enumerates the powers of the different branches of government. Its treatment of the island of Nevis is rather unusual among federated nations.

The current constitution of Saint Kitts and Nevis was prepared in anticipation of the country achieving independence from Britain. It is the only constitution the country has had as an independent nation, however there were several colonial constitutions before it. The union of the islands of Saint Kitts and Nevis has been controversial at least since 1882, leading the constitution to specifically provide for a path to independence for Nevis. This makes Saint Kitts and Nevis unusual among Federations.

The government created by the constitution is a constitutional monarchy headed by Elizabeth II, with a unicameral legislature. Nevis is provided with a separate island administration, but Saint Kitts is not.

== Background ==
The islands of Anguilla, Saint Kitts, and Nevis formed a British crown colony known as Saint Christopher-Nevis-Anguilla from 1882 until Anguilla rebelled in 1971. On 19 September 1983 the remaining two islands, Saint Kitts and Nevis, achieved independence from Britain. In preparation for independence, a draft constitution was presented on June 22, 1983 and accepted on June 23, to take effect upon independence.

The union of the three islands, and later the two islands was never easy, with Anguilla and Nevis being strongly opposed to the union with Saint Kitts. Nevis protested strongly against being joined with Saint Kitts from the time the idea was first broached by the British Colonial Office in 1867 until the present.

The 1983 constitution was not the first constitution for Saint Kitts and Nevis; the CIA World Factbook says there were "several previous" constitutions. However, it was the constitution enacted at the founding of the modern state of Saint Kitts and Nevis, and has not yet been replaced. Following the failed Nevis independence referendum in 1998, a commission was appointed to make recommendations for future relations between the two islands, and together with a subsequently appointed constitutional task force, recommended a number of changes to the current constitution.

== Nevis ==
The constitution of Saint Kitts and Nevis is rather unusual in that it provides Nevis with a great deal of autonomy, and contains a provision allowing Nevis to secede should a two thirds majority of the island's citizens vote for secession. In 1998 a referendum failed to achieve the required two thirds majority for independence.

== Structure of Government ==
The constitution establishes Saint Kitts and Nevis as a federation consisting of two states, one on each island. However, Saint Kitts and Nevis differs from most federated states in that in a normal federation each state has its own regional government, with the federated government providing an overarching government. However, while the Constitution provides for Nevis to have its own separate legislature, Saint Kitts is governed directly by the National Assembly. Also, the constitution provides for the appointment of a Governor General for the whole of Saint Kitts and Nevis, who appoints a Deputy Governor of Nevis. So while Nevis has its own legislature, assembly, and island administration, Saint Kitts has no such independent legislative bodies and so it is not a typical federated government. The Constitution of Saint Kitts and Nevis is unique in that it creates a federation not between Saint Kitts and Nevis, but between Nevis and the federation of Saint Kitts and Nevis.

It provides for the establishment of a unicameral legislature known as the National Assembly. The constitution directs that Saint Kitts and Nevis be divided into no fewer than 11 constituencies, at least 1/3 of which are in Nevis. The national assembly contains one representative from each constituency, together with at least three appointed senators.

The national assembly is empowered to make laws, but its ability to make laws impacting Nevis is restricted by Section 37 and Chapter X.

== Provisions of the Constitution of Saint Kitts and Nevis ==
The constitution consists of 120 articles arranged in 11 chapters, and six schedules appended to the end.

=== Chapter 1 – The Federation and The Constitution ===
The first chapter of the Constitution provides for the establishment of "a sovereign democratic federal state which may be styled Saint Christopher and Nevis or Saint Kitts and Nevis or the Federation of Saint Christopher and Nevis or the Federation of Saint Kitts and Nevis." It defines the territory such nation encompasses, and provides for the Constitution to be the supreme law of the land.

=== Chapter 2 – Protection of Fundamental Rights and Freedoms ===
Chapter II of the constitution is a Bill of rights for the citizens of the nation. It contains fifteen provisions which specify such rights as a right to life, protection from slavery or forced labour, protection of personal property, freedom of expression, freedom of assembly, and similar rights. The next five provisions concern circumstances of emergency under which some of the previously enumerated rights may be derogated.

=== Chapter 3 – The Governor-General ===
Chapter III provides for the offices of the Governor-General, Deputy Governor-General, and the oath of office of the Governor General.

=== Chapter 4 – Parliament ===
Chapter IV provides for the establishment of Parliament, describes its composition, the respective qualifications and disqualifications of representatives and senators, the process by which representatives are to be elected and senators appointed, their terms of office, and other matters dealing with Parliament. It also enumerates the powers of Parliament, the procedures for amending the constitution, making laws, holding elections, and determining constituencies.

=== Chapter 5 – The Executive ===
Chapter V of the constitution provides for Saint Kitts and Nevis to be a constitutional monarchy under Her Majesty Elizabeth the Second, by the Grace of God, Queen of Saint Christopher and Nevis and of Her other Realms and Territories, Head of the Commonwealth. The executive authority is to be exercised by the Governor General. It provides for the appointment of a cabinet and ministers, makes provision for the absence or illness of the Prime Minister, describes how the Governor General is to carry out his functions, provides for a Leader of the Opposition, various Secretaries, Attorney General, describes procedures for public prosecutions, and provides for the Governor General to grant pardons, respites, and lessen punishments.

=== Chapter 6 – Finance ===
Chapter VI provides for a financial system for the federation.

=== Chapter 7 – The Public Service Commission ===
Chapter VII provides for the establishment of a Public Service Commission, which is to make recommendations to the Governor General on the appointing of various public officers.

=== Chapter 8 – Citizenship ===
Chapter VIII spells out which persons are citizens of Saint Kitts and Nevis. The first part concerns persons who would become citizens of the federation at independence. The second part provides for all persons born in Saint Kitts and Nevis after independence to be citizens, provided they don't fall under one of two exceptions, and for children of citizens who are born oversees and whose parents are employed by the government in jobs that require them to be overseas. There are also provisions for the acquisition of citizenship, allowance of dual citizenship, and deprivation of citizenship.

=== Chapter 9 – Judicial Provisions ===
Chapter nine gives the high court original jurisdiction over constitutional questions, however the party alleging the constitutional issue must apply to the High Court for relief. High Court appeals can be heard by the Appeals Court, whose decisions can, in turn, be appealed to Her Majesty in council.

=== Chapter 10 – The Island of Nevis ===
Chapter 10 provides for Nevis to have its own legislature and assembly. The Assembly is to consist of one elected member for each electoral district, and at least three but not more than two thirds the number of elected members, who are appointed by the legislature. It also provides for a Nevis Island Administration, consisting of a Premier and other members appointed by the Governor General. It gives the Nevis island legislature power to make laws, or ordinances, "for the peace, order and good government of the island of Nevis with respect to the specified matters." Chapter ten limits the Governor General's power with respect to Nevis, requiring him to act in accordance with the advice of the Island Administration.

The Island Administration is given exclusive authority on Nevis with regard to a list of things including: airports and seaports, education, mining, fishing, health and welfare, labour, government owned land, and imports and exports. Disputes between the Island Administration and the Government are to be handled by the High Court. Lastly, Chapter Ten includes provisions relating to separation of Nevis from the federation.

=== Chapter 11 – Miscellaneous ===
Chapter XI of the constitution includes provisions relating to how the secession of Nevis would alter the constitution itself, additional functions of the Governor General, how to handle the resignation of various public officials, how words and phrases in the constitution are to be interpreted, and handling modifications of various provisions.

=== Schedules ===
Appended to the end of the constitution are six schedules which are referred to earlier in the document. They set forth instructions for things like determining constituencies (or electoral districts), alterations to the constitution should Nevis succeed, oaths of office, and legislative powers, among other things.
