= Royal St Christopher and Nevis Police Force =

The Royal St Christopher and Nevis Police Force is the police force responsible for law enforcement on Saint Kitts and Nevis. The force was formed in 1960, when it was a colony of Great Britain. The current Commissioner of the force is Ian Queeley.

== Past Commissioners/Chiefs of Police ==
- Mr. Celvon Geron Walwyn 2011 - 2015
- Mr. Austin Williams 2008 - 2011
- Mr. Robert W. Jeffers 2004 - 2008
- Mr. J. Calvin Fahie 1998 - 2004
- Mr. Bryan Reynolds 1995 – 1998
- Mr. Derrick O Thompson 1993 – 1995
- Mr. Stanley V Franks 1980 - 1993
- Mr. Joseph Francis 1979 - 1980
- Mr. Oriel Hector 1975 – 1979
- Mr. John Morgan Lewis 1973 – 1975
- Mr. John Henry Lynch – Wade 1969 – 1973
- Mr. Kenneth Duff 1969
- Mr. Walter V Samuels 1960 – 1964

== Sources ==
1. World Police Encyclopedia, ed. by Dilip K. Das & Michael Palmiotto. by Taylor & Francis. 2004,
2. World Encyclopedia of Police Forces and Correctional Systems, 2nd. edition, Gale., 2006
3. Sullivan, Larry E. et al. Encyclopedia of Law Enforcement. Thousand Oaks: Sage Publications, 2005.
