= Government House, Basseterre =

Coordinates: 17°17′56″N 62°43′56″W

Government House
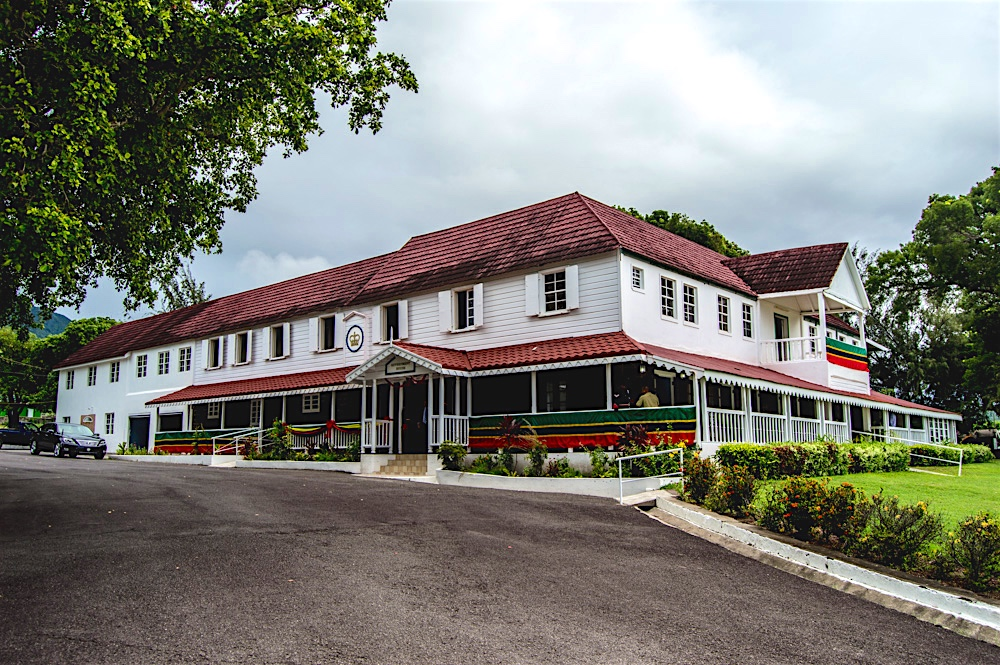
- Interactive map of the Government House area
- Alternative names: Springfield House

General information
- Type: Official residence
- Location: Basseterre, Saint Kitts, Saint Kitts and Nevis
- Current tenants: Governor-General of Saint Kitts and Nevis
- Construction started: 1833
- Completed: 1834
- Owner: Government of Saint Kitts and Nevis

Technical details
- Floor count: 3

Government House, also known as Springfield House, is the official residence of the governor-general of Saint Kitts and Nevis, currently Dame Marcella Liburd.

== History ==
In 1837, Sir Henry Blake sold the twenty-five acre lot to Thomas Harper who renamed it Springfield and built a house on it. Because Thomas Harper ran into debt, the property passed into the hands of Robert Sharry Harper, trustee under the marriage settlement of Mary Sharry Harper née Amory. When the archdeaconry of St Kitts was created due to the establishment of the Diocese of Antigua in 1842, it was felt that the rector of St George should be accommodated in a style more suitable for his new position of archdeacon. In keeping with this ambition, Francis Robert Brathwaite, the first archdeacon, bought Springfield from the Harpers in September 1848.

In 1855 Springfield house was conveyed in trust for public uses and purposes as determined by the governor, privy council, and Assembly. After repairs, it was appointed as the residence for then-rector the Venerable Archdeacon Jermyn in 1856. The property served as the residence of successive Rectors until disestablishment in 1874.

In 1946, after much repair, Sir Frederick Albert Phillip, the then-governor moved into the Springfield House.

Today, Springfield House, commonly known as the Government House of St. Kitts & Nevis, is the official residence of the governor-general of The Federation of St. Kitts and Nevis.

== See also ==
- Government Houses of the British Empire and Commonwealth
- Governor-General of Saint Kitts and Nevis
