= Edmund Wickham Lawrence =

Kittitian civil servant (1932–2025)

His Excellency Sir Edmund Wickham Lawrence GCMG OBE CSM JP
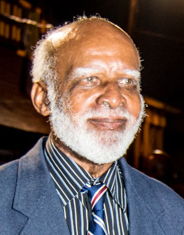
- Lawrence in 2014

3rd Governor-General of Saint Kitts and Nevis
- In office 2 January 2013 – 19 May 2015
- Monarch: Elizabeth II
- Prime Minister: Denzil Douglas; Timothy Harris
- Preceded by: Cuthbert Sebastian
- Succeeded by: Tapley Seaton

Personal details
- Born: 14 February 1932 Saint Kitts, Saint Kitts and Nevis
- Died: 7 September 2025 (aged 93) Saint Kitts, Saint Kitts and Nevis
- Spouse(s): Hulda, Lady Lawrence
- Education: University of London

Sir Edmund Wickham Lawrence GCMG OBE CSM JP (14 February 1932 – 7 September 2025) was the third Governor-General of Saint Kitts and Nevis, serving from 2013 to 2015. He was sworn in at midnight on 1 January 2013. Lawrence was a Methodist. He taught in elementary schools in St Kitts between 1951 and 1954. Lawrence graduated from the University of London in 1966 with a degree in Economics.

== Life and career ==
Following his graduation from the University of London, Lawrence lectured at Walbrook College in London from 1967 to 1969. He then returned to St Kitts.

In 1970, Lawrence established the St Kitts-Nevis-Anguilla National Bank, which has grown in assets from US$75 Thousand to over US$1 Billion making it the largest local bank in the Eastern Caribbean. Lawrence also established the National Bank Trust Company (NBTC) in 1972, the National Caribbean Insurance Company (NCIC) in 1973, and the St Kitts and Nevis Mortgage and Investment Company (MICO) in 2001, together forming the National Bank Group of Companies.

He was a founding member of the Standing Committee of Chief Executives of Indigenous Commercial Banks (now termed the Caribbean Association of Banks) in the Caribbean Community (CARICOM). Lawrence held several high level executive positions and directorships in companies and corporations in the private and public sectors in St Kitts and Nevis and throughout the Eastern Caribbean between 1971 and 2012.

In the 1999 New Year Honours, Lawrence was appointed as an Officer of the Most Excellent Order of the British Empire (OBE) for services to banking and commerce.

In 2009, he was awarded the National Honour as Companion of the Star of Merit (CSM).

In the 2010 New Year Honours, Queen Elizabeth II appointed Lawrence Knight Commander of the Order of St Michael and St George (KCMG) for his services to banking and finance.

In June 2013, Queen Elizabeth II appointed him Knight Grand Cross of the Order of St Michael and St George (GCMG). He was invested with the insignia by Prince Harry in November 2016.

Lawrence was actively involved in several non-profit organizations, including the Brimstone Hill Fortress National Park Society and Rotary International.

He was married to Hulda, Lady Lawrence, and they had six children.

In May 2015, Lawrence retired from his post of Governor-General of St Kitts and Nevis.

Lawrence died at his home in St Kitts, on 7 September 2025, at the age of 93.

== Honours ==
=== Commonwealth ===
- 2013: Knight Grand Cross of the Order of St Michael and St George (GCMG)
  - 2010 - 2013: Knight Grand Cross of the Order of St Michael and St George (KCMG)
- 1999: Officer of the Order of the British Empire (OBE)
- 2009: Companion of the Star of Merit (CSM)

Government offices
| Preceded by Cuthbert Sebastian | Governor-General of Saint Kitts and Nevis; 2013–2015 | Succeeded by Tapley Seaton |
