= Culturama =

Festival in Nevis

Each year, Nevisians celebrate their heritage during Culturama. It is Nevis' answer to the diverse range of carnivals enjoyed on other Caribbean islands. Held annually in late July/early August, it celebrates Nevisians who have moved away and returned to party with their friends and family. It is a commemoration and festival enjoying the cultural traditions. There's music every night, parties, food festivals, and concerts, culminating in the early march through downtown Charlestown.

The festival started in 1974. The idea of Culturama was conceived in February 1974 during a meeting of the Nevis Dramatic and Cultural Society (NEDACS).
