= Lanien Blanchette =

St Kitts and Nevis politician

Speaker of the National Assembly of Saint Kitts and Nevis
- Incumbent
- Assumed office October 2022
- Prime Minister: Terrance Drew
- Preceded by: Anthony Michael Perkins

Personal details
- Born: 1986 (age 39–40)
- Party: SKNLP
- Education: University of the West Indies

Lanien Blanchette (born 1986) is a politician from Saint Kitts and Nevis, who as of 2022 is serving as Speaker of National Assembly of Saint Kitts and Nevis.

She has bachelor's degree in criminal justice from Monroe College, New York. She graduated from bachelor of laws programme at the University of the West Indies, Cave Hill Campus in Barbados. She is a lawyer.
