= Anthony Michael Perkins =

St Kitts and Nevis politician

Michael Perkins
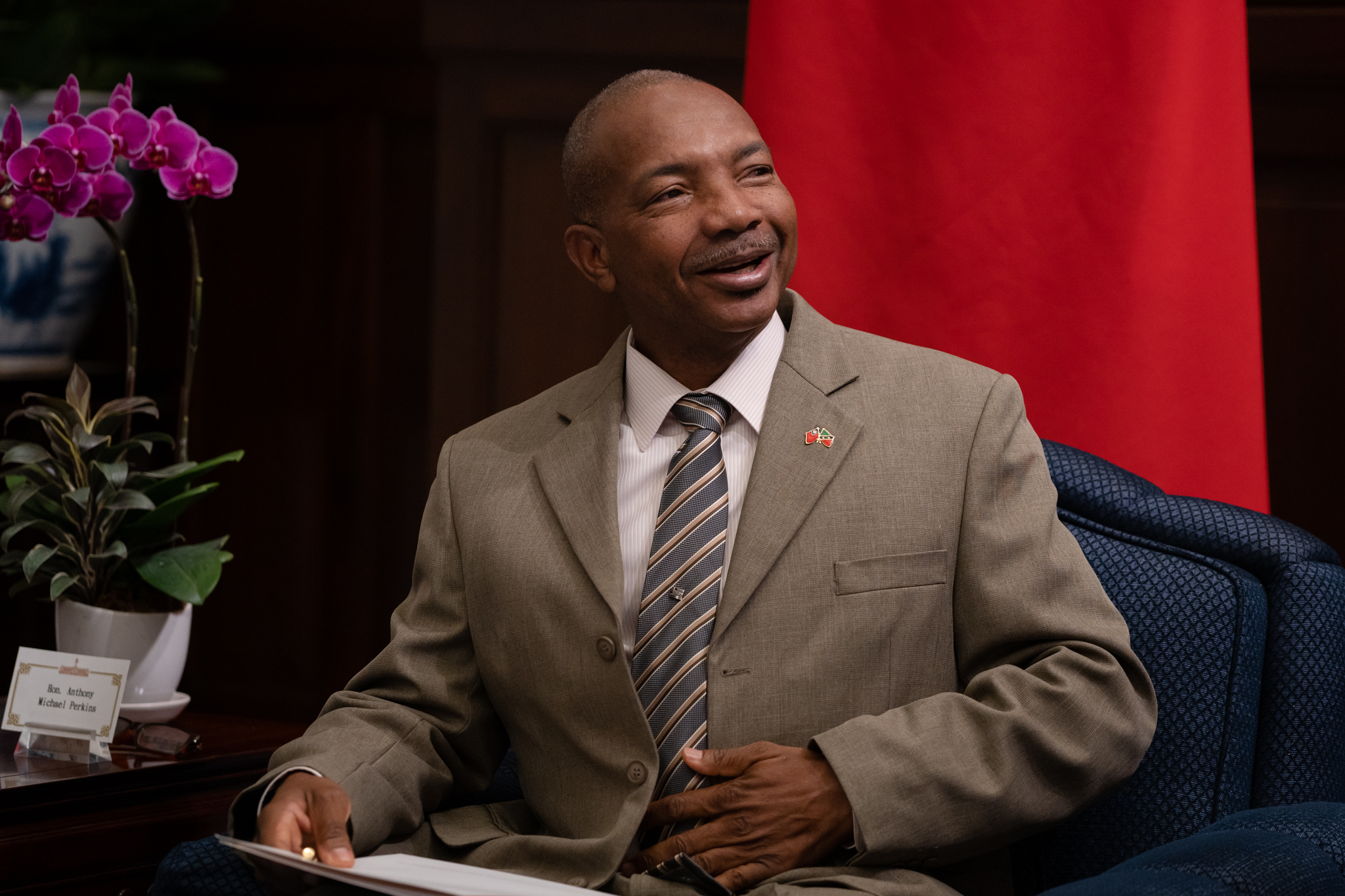

Speaker of the National Assembly of Saint Kitts and Nevis
- In office June 2016 – October 2022
- Prime Minister: Timothy Harris
- Preceded by: Franklin Brand
- Succeeded by: Lanien Blanchette

Personal details
- Born: 1964 (age 61–62)
- Party: CCM

Anthony Michael Perkins (born 1964)is a politician from Concerned Citizens' Movement in Saint Kitts and Nevis. He was elected on 30 June 2016 as Speaker of the National Assembly of Saint Kitts and Nevis.

Perkins is from Charlestown, Nevis. He served as the elected Representative for St. Paul, Nevis from 2001 to 2006, and was Nevis Island Administration minister of communications, works, public utilities, posts, infrastructural development, physical planning and environment. Following CCM loss in the 2006 elections for Nevis Island Administration, he pursued an MBA degree in general management from the Metropolitan College of New York, where he graduated in 2008. He was also a senator in the National Assembly from 2000 to 2010. In May 2015, he was elected deputy speaker of the National Assembly.
