= COVID-19 pandemic in Saint Kitts and Nevis =

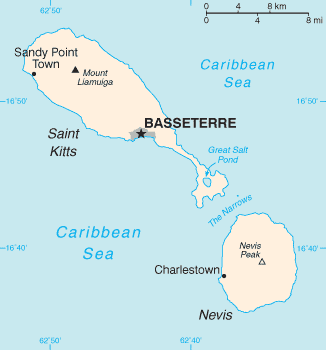
- Disease: COVID-19
- Pathogen: SARS-CoV-2
- Location: Saint Kitts and Nevis
- First outbreak: Wuhan, China
- Arrival date: 25 March 2020 (6 years, 6 months, 1 week and 2 days)
- Confirmed cases: 6,607
- Active cases: 208 (as of 18 June 2021)
- Critical cases: 1
- Recovered: 70
- Deaths: 46
- Vaccinations: 33,794 (total vaccinated); 27,000 (fully vaccinated); 64,297 (doses administered)

Government website
- covid19.gov.kn

The COVID-19 pandemic in Saint Kitts and Nevis is part of the ongoing viral pandemic of coronavirus disease 2019 (COVID-19), which was confirmed to have reached Saint Kitts and Nevis on 24 March 2020. By 19 May, all cases had recovered, with the disease reappearing on 4 July. By 10 August, all cases had again recovered.

== Background ==
On 12 January 2020, the World Health Organization (WHO) confirmed that a novel coronavirus was the cause of a respiratory illness in a cluster of people in Wuhan City, Hubei Province, China, which was reported to the WHO on 31 December 2019.

The case fatality ratio for COVID-19 has been much lower than SARS of 2003, but the transmission has been significantly greater, with a significant total death toll.

== Timeline ==
Cases

Deaths

=== March 2020 ===
On 24 March 2020, a 21-year-old male and a 57-year-old female who had arrived in the federation from New York City became the first two confirmed cases of COVID-19. Both are nationals of St Kitts and Nevis.

On 28 March 2020, St Kitts and Nevis recorded five additional cases of COVID-19 bringing the total number of confirmed cases to seven. "These cases involved three females and two males who are all citizens of St Kitts and Nevis. The females were aged 10 months, 24 years and 36 years, while the two male patients were 29 years and 39 years," Minister of State with responsibility for Health, Sen. the Hon Wendy Phipps said in a statement. She said all five of these cases are travel related "meaning that the cases were imported into the Federation". "This determination was made based on the patients' travel history to St Maarten and Antigua during the period March 6 to 13, 2020," the junior health minister said.

On 29 March 2020, St Kitts and Nevis recorded one additional case of COVID-19 bringing the total number of confirmed cases to eight. The Minister of State with responsibility for Health, Sen. the Hon Wendy Phipps disclosed that "The patient is a 51-year-old female who is citizen of St Kitts and Nevis and resident on Nevis".

On 31 March 2020, a full lockdown came into effect. From 19:00 31 March until 06:00 3 April, there was a 24-hour curfew. The lockdown was later extended to 07:00 9 April, and further extended to 18 April with two days of partial lockdown in order to buy essential goods. The lockdown was once again extended to 25 April.

=== April 2020 ===
On 1 April 2020, a 9th case was reported. St Kitts and Nevis recorded one additional case of COVID-19 and brought the total number confirmed cases to nine. The patient was a citizen of St Kitts and Nevis and resident on Nevis," Sen Phipps informed the nation at a 3:p.m. update.(2nd on Nevis)

On 4 April 2020, St. Kitts and Nevis recorded one additional case of COVID-19. Junior Minister of Health, Senator Wendy Phipps announced it brought the total number of confirmed cases to 10. The patient was a 66 year-old female who is a citizen of St. Kitts and Nevis, and resident on Nevis.

On 5 April, the Queen of Saint Kitts and Nevis addressed the Commonwealth in a televised broadcast, in which she asked people to "take comfort that while we may have more still to endure, better days will return". She added, "we will be with our friends again; we will be with our families again; we will meet again".

On 6 April 2020, the Federal Ministry of Health in St. Kitts and Nevis confirmed today that as at 12:29 p.m. on Monday 6 April 2020, there has been an additional confirmed case of COVID-19. This raises the total number of positive results to eleven. The newest case is a 35-year-old male citizen of the twin-island federation residing in Nevis. This confirmation means that there are now four cases of the coronavirus on Nevis and seven on St. Kitts.

On 10 April 2020, the Minister of State with responsibility for Health, Senator Wendy Phipps, made the disclosure "We now have 12 confirmed positives. The individual is an Indian national who happens to be of the age of 21 years old who had direct contact with a previously announced case" "The person had been placed in quarantine since March 29 when he was first named a contact of a previously confirmed case and was sampled and tested"

On 14 April 2020, St. Kitts and Nevis recorded two additional cases of COVID-19, bringing the total number of confirmed cases to fourteen since the first case was reported on Wednesday, 25 March. All fourteen cases are under strict isolation. Additionally, some 111 persons have been quarantined at home. While 234 persons have been tested, 187 have had negative results and the results of 33 persons are still pending at this date. Ten cases are located in Saint Kitts and 4 cases in Nevis.

On 27 April 2020, on Monday, Tuesday, and Friday, people were allowed to leave their house for essential business between 06:00 and 19:00. Wearing face masks is mandatory.

=== May 2020 ===
On 3 May 2020, it was reported that 2,000 people had received benefits from the COVID-19 Emergency Relief Fund. People who did not qualify in April would still benefit.

On 8 May 2020, it was announced that there would be a 24-hour curfew on Saturday 9 May and Sunday 10 May.

By 19 May 2020, all cases had recovered.

=== July 2020 ===
On 4 July 2020, an additional case was recorded in a national who had returned from Washington, D.C., on 19 June.

=== August 2020 ===
On 10 August 2020, the last active case recovered, and there were no active cases.

== Measures ==
- All airport and ports are closed for passengers.
- All schools are closed.
- Curfew has been instituted. As of 27 April, there is a partial curfew with limited exceptions for essential business.
- Wearing face masks outside is mandatory.
- All non-essential businesses are closed. From 11 May onwards, there will be one day of limited operations for businesses. From 18 May, it will be extended to five days.
- Restriction on social activities.
- Suspension of liquor licences.

== See also ==
- Caribbean Public Health Agency
- COVID-19 pandemic in North America
- COVID-19 pandemic by country and territory
