= Tapley Seaton =

Governor-General of Saint Kitts and Nevis (2015–2023)

His Excellency Sir Tapley Seaton GCMG CVO KC JP
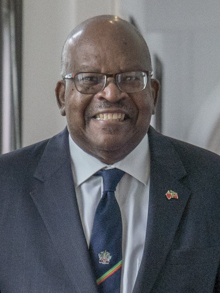
- Seaton in 2018

4th Governor-General of Saint Kitts and Nevis
- In office 19 May 2015 – 31 January 2023; Acting: 19 May 2015 – 2 September 2015
- Monarchs: Elizabeth II; Charles III
- Prime Minister: Timothy Harris; Terrance Drew
- Preceded by: Edmund Lawrence
- Succeeded by: Marcella Liburd

Personal details
- Born: Samuel Weymouth Tapley Seaton; 28 July 1950 Saint Kitts
- Died: 29 June 2023 (aged 72)
- Education: University of the West Indies; Hugh Wooding Law School

Sir Samuel Weymouth Tapley Seaton (28 July 1950 – 29 June 2023) was the fourth governor-general of Saint Kitts and Nevis from 2015 to 2023.

== Early life and education ==
Seaton was born on Saint Kitts, the son of William A. Seaton and his wife, Pearl A. Seaton, née Godwin. He received his primary and secondary education from Epworth Junior School, Basseterre High School, and St. Kitts-Nevis Grammar School. He attended The University of West Indies in Jamaica and received a Bachelor of Laws degree, a moment that set forth his legal career. He continued further studies with the Council of Legal Education (at the Hugh Wooding Law School, Trinidad, and the Norman Manley Law School, Jamaica), where he gained his Legal Education Certificate, and the University of Bordeaux in France, where he completed a Diploma in French. He also was a certified Legal Drafter having completed the Legal Drafting Diploma course at the University of Ottawa, Canada.

== Career ==
Seaton joined the St. Kitts-Nevis Judicial Service, and served as registrar of the Supreme Court, provost marshal, and acting additional magistrate. In 1975, Seaton served as crown counsel for the Attorney General’s Chambers and worked as the High Court Registrar. In 1980, he took on the St. Kitts-Nevis Attorney General role, serving until 1995. In 1988, he was appointed one of Her Majesty’s Counsels (Queen’s Counsel).

Seaton became acting governor-general after the ouster of his predecessor Sir Edmund Wickham Lawrence on 20 May 2015. On 1 September 2015, he was officially appointed governor-general by Queen Elizabeth II on the advice of Prime Minister Timothy Harris.

Aside from his official duties, Seaton served on various boards, national committees, and organisations. Some of these positions included director of SSMC, the Chamber of Industry and Commerce, and Frigate Bay Development Corporation; president of the St. Christopher Heritage Society (now The St. Christopher National Trust), the St. Kitts-Nevis Bar Association and the OECS Bar Association; and vice president for the Brimstone Hill Fortress National Park Society and the St. Christopher National Trust; chairman of Cable & Wireless (formerly SCANTEL).

== Death ==
Seaton died on 29 June 2023, at the age of 72, five months after leaving office.

== Awards and decorations ==
- Knight Grand Cross of the Most Distinguished Order of St Michael and St George (GCMG) (9 November 2015)
- Commander of the Royal Victorian Order (CVO) (23 October 1985)

Government offices
Preceded by Edmund Lawrence	Governor-General of Saint Kitts and Nevis; 2015–2023	Succeeded by Marcella Liburd
