= Governor-General of Saint Kitts and Nevis =

Representative of the monarch

- Coat of arms of Saint Kitts and Nevis

- Flag of the governor-general

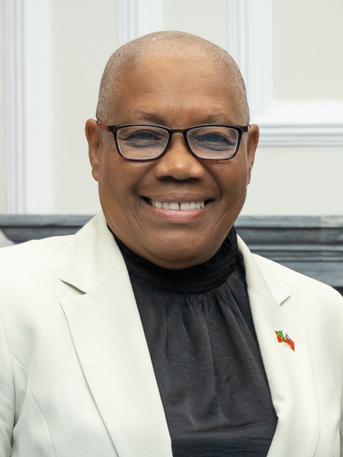
- Incumbent; Marcella Liburd since 1 February 2023
- Style: Her Excellency
- Residence: Government House, Basseterre
- Appointer: Monarch of Saint Kitts and Nevis on the advice of the prime minister
- Term length: At His Majesty's pleasure
- Constituting instrument: Constitution of Saint Kitts and Nevis
- Formation: 19 September 1983; 42 years ago
- First holder: Sir Clement Arrindell
- Salary: EC$138,000 annually
- Website: gg.gov.kn

The governor-general of Saint Kitts and Nevis is the representative of the monarch of Saint Kitts and Nevis, currently King Charles III. The appointed governor-general, currently Marcella Liburd, lives in Government House, Basseterre, which serves as her official residence.

The governor-general appoints a deputy governor-general for Nevis.

== Constitutional basis ==
The office of governor-general is established by section 21 of the constitution of Saint Kitts and Nevis, which provides that the governor-general is appointed by the monarch and serves at His Majesty's pleasure. The governor-general must be a citizen of Saint Kitts and Nevis.

== List of governors-general ==
Following is a list of people who have served as Governor-General of Saint Kitts and Nevis since independence in 1983.

Denotes acting governors-general

No.	Portrait	Name (Birth–Death)	Term of office			Monarch (Reign)
No.	Portrait	Name (Birth–Death)	Took office	Left office	Time in office	Monarch (Reign)
1		Sir Clement Arrindell (1931–2011)	19 September 1983	31 December 1995	12 years, 103 days	Elizabeth II (1983–2022)
2		Sir Cuthbert Sebastian (1921–2017)	1 January 1996	1 January 2013	17 years, 0 days	Elizabeth II (1983–2022)
3		Sir Edmund Lawrence (1932–2025)	2 January 2013	19 May 2015	2 years, 137 days	Elizabeth II (1983–2022)
–		Tapley Seaton (1950–2023); Acting Governor-General	19 May 2015	2 September 2015	106 days	Elizabeth II (1983–2022)
4		Sir Tapley Seaton (1950–2023)	2 September 2015	31 January 2023	7 years, 151 days	
4		Sir Tapley Seaton (1950–2023)	2 September 2015	31 January 2023	7 years, 151 days	Charles III (2022–present)
5		Dame Marcella Liburd (b. 1953)	1 February 2023	Incumbent	3 years, 218 days	Charles III (2022–present)

== Constitutional powers, functions and duties ==
The office of Governor-General is provided for by Chapter III, Sections 21 to 24 of the Constitution. These state:

22.-

1. During any period when the office of Governor-General is vacant or the holder of the office of Governor-General is absent from Saint Christopher and Nevis or is for any other reason unable to perform the functions of his office those functions shall be performed by such person as Her Majesty may appoint.
2. Any person appointed under subsection (1) shall hold office during Her Majesty's pleasure and shall in any case cease to perform the functions of the office of Governor-General if the holder of the office of Governor-General has notified him that he is about to assume or resume those functions.
3. The holder of the office of Governor-General shall not, for the purposes of this section, be regarded as absent from Saint Christopher and Nevis or as unable to perform the function of his office-

a. by reason that he is in passage from one part of Saint Christopher and Nevis to another; or
b. at any time when there is a subsisting appointment of a deputy under section 23(1).

Deputy to Governor-General.

23.-

1. When the Governor-General-

a. has occasion to be absent from the seat of government but not from Saint Christopher and Nevis;
b. has occasion to be absent from Saint Christopher and Nevis for a period that he considers, in his own deliberate judgment, will be of short duration; or
c. is suffering from an illness that he considers, in his own deliberate judgment, will be of short duration,

he may appoint any person in Saint Christopher and Nevis to be his deputy during such absence or illness and in that capacity to perform on his behalf such of the functions of the office of Governor-General as he may specify.
2. Without prejudice to subsection (1), the Governor-General shall appoint a person in the island of Nevis as Deputy Governor-General to be his deputy in that island and in that capacity to signify on his behalf that he assents or withholds his assent to any bill passed by the Nevis Island Assembly and to perform on his behalf such other functions of the office of Governor-General relating to that island as he may specify.
3. The power and authority of the Governor-General shall not be abridged, altered or in any way affected by the appointment of a deputy under this section and, subject to the provisions of this Constitution and any other law, a deputy shall conform to and observe all instructions that the Governor-General, acting in his own deliberate judgment, may from time to time address to him:
Provided that the question whether or not a deputy has conformed to and observed any such instructions shall not be enquired into by any court of law.
4. Subject to subsection (5), a person appointed under subsection (1) or, as the case may be, subsection(2) shall hold his appointment for such period as may be specified by the Governor-General at the time of his appointment.
5. Any appointment made under subsection (1) or, as the case may be, subsection (2) may be revoked at any time by the Governor-General.
6. The Governor-General shall act-

a) in relation to the making of an appointment under subsection (1) or the revocation of such an appointment, in accordance with the advice of the Prime Minister; and
b) in relation to the making of an appointment under subsection (2) or the revocation of such an appointment, in accordance with the advice of the Premier.

Oaths.

24.- A person appointed to hold or act in the office of Governor-General or to be his deputy shall, before entering upon the duties of that office, take and subscribe the oath of allegiance and the oath of office.

== See also ==
- List of colonial governors and administrators of Saint Christopher
- List of colonial governors and administrators of Nevis
- List of prime ministers of Saint Kitts and Nevis
- Attorney General of Saint Kitts and Nevis
