= List of colonial governors and administrators of Saint Christopher =

This is a list of viceroys in Saint Christopher (Saint Kitts), from the start of English colonisation in 1623 and French colonisation in 1625, until the island's independence from the United Kingdom as Saint Kitts and Nevis in 1983.

== English Governors of Saint Christopher (1623–1666) ==
- Sir Thomas Warner, 1623–1649
- Rowland Rich (or Redge), 1649–1651
- Clement Everard, 1651–1660
- William Watts, 1660–1666

In 1666, war broke between the French and English colonies, and the French gained control of the entire island.

== French Governors of Saint-Christophe (1625–1713) ==
- Pierre Belain d'Esnambuc, 1625–1636
- Pierre du Halde, 1636–1638
- René de Béthoulat de La Grange-Fromenteau, 1638–1639
- Phillippe de Longvilliers de Poincy, 1639–1644, first time
- Robert de Longvilliers de Poincy, 1644–1646
- Phillippe de Longvilliers de Poincy, 1646–1660, second time
- Charles de Sales, 1660–1666
- Claude de Roux de Saint-Laurent, 1666–1689
- Charles de Pechpeyrou-Comminges de Guitaut, 1689–1690

Between 1690 and 1697, English had control of the entire island.

- Jean-Baptiste de Gennes, 1698–1702.

In 1702, English forces again seized control of the entire island. The Treaty of Utrecht of 1713, finally ceded the entire island to Great Britain.

== English Deputy Governors of Saint Christopher (1671–1769) ==
The 1667 Treaty of Breda restored the English portions of the island to its owners. In 1671, Saint Christopher joined the British Leeward Islands, which was administered from Antigua by the Governor of the Leeward Islands. Until 1769, a deputy governor was appointed to oversee local affairs.

- Abednego Mathew, 1671–1681
- Thomas Hill, 1682–1697
- James Norton, 1697–1701
- Walter Hamilton, 1704–1706

In 1706, French forces under Henri-Louis de Chavagnac occupied the island.

- Michael Lambert, 1706–1715
- William Mathews, Jr., 1715–1733
- Gilbert Fleming, 1733–1769

== Governors of Saint Christopher (1816–1833) ==
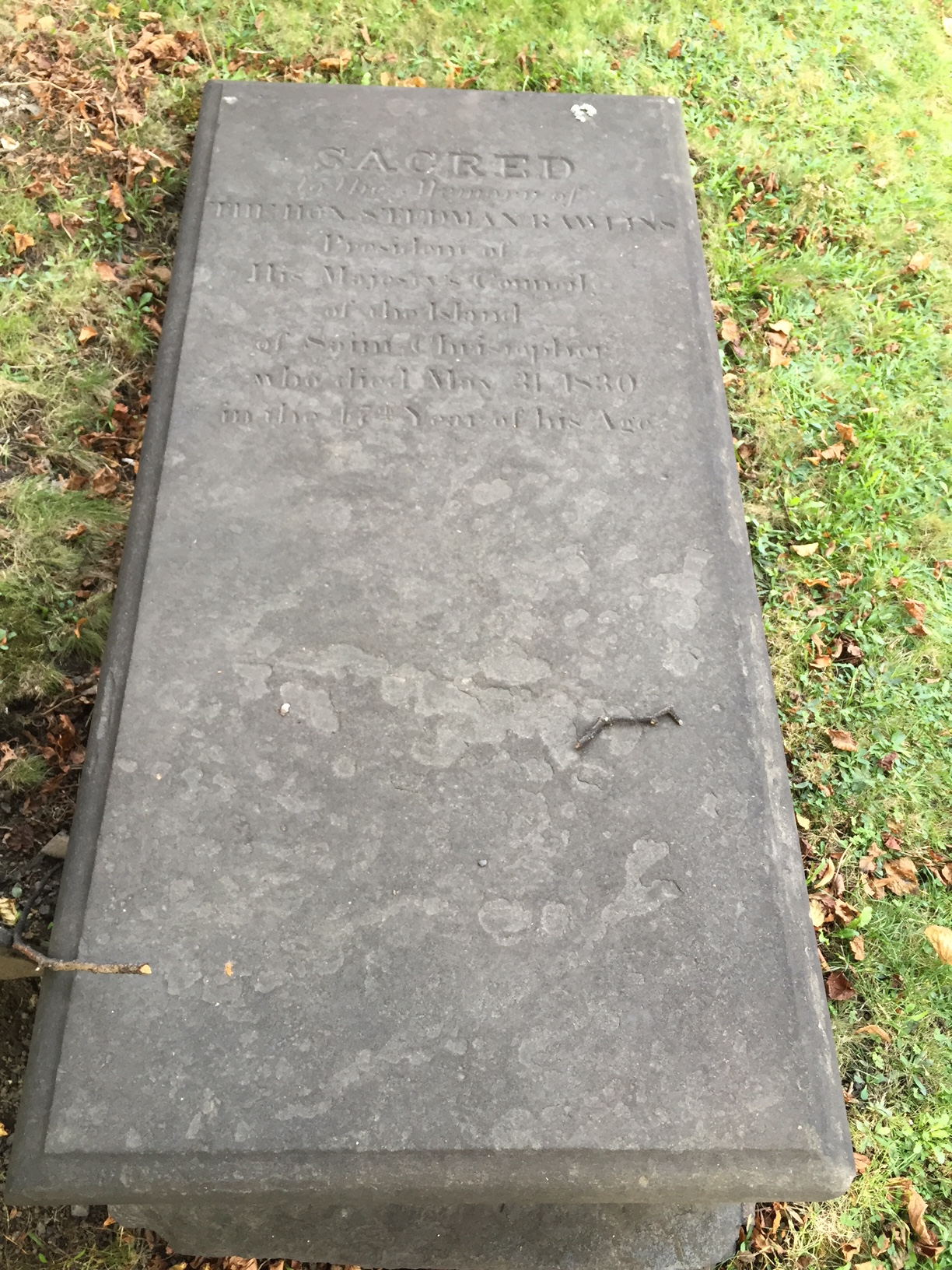
Hon Stedman Rawlins, Old Burying Ground (Halifax, Nova Scotia)

In 1816, the British Leeward Islands was dissolved, and Saint Christopher was again administered separately.

- Stedman Rawlins, 1816
- Thomas Probyn, 1816–1821
- Charles William Maxwell, 1821–1832
- Lieutenant-General Sir William Nicolay, 1832–1833

== Lieutenant Governors of Saint Christopher (1833–1870) ==
In 1833, the British Leeward Islands was reformed. A lieutenant governor was appointed to oversee Saint Christopher, subordinate to the Governor of Antigua, viceroy in the reformed colony.

- John Lyons Nixon 1833–1836
- Henry George Macleod, 1836–1839
- Charles Cunningham, 1839–1847
- Robert James Mackintosh, 1847–1850
- Edward Hay Drummond Hay, 1850–1855
- Hercules George Robert Robinson, 1855–1859
- Benjamin Chilley Campbell Pine, 1860–1866
- James George Mackenzie, 1867–1869
- William Wellington Cairns, 1869–1870

== Presidents of Saint Christopher (1870–1883) ==
- Francis Spencer Wigley, 1870–1872, first time
- James Samuel Berridge, 1872–1873
- Alexander Wilson Moir, 1873–1883

== Presidents of Saint Christopher, Nevis and Anguilla (1883–1888) ==
In 1883, Saint Christopher was united with Nevis and Anguilla under a single presidency based in Saint Christopher and named Saint Christopher, Nevis and Anguilla.

- Charles Monroe Eldridge, 1883–1885
- Francis Spencer Wigley, 1885–1888

== Commissioner of Saint Christopher, Nevis and Anguilla (1889–1895) ==
- John Kemys Spencer-Churchill, 1889–1895

== Administrators of Saint Christopher, Nevis and Anguilla (1895–1967) ==
Standard of the Governor (1958–1967).

- Thomas Riseley Griffith, 1895–1899
- Charles Thomas Cox, 1899–1904
- Sir Robert Bromley, 1904–1906
- Thomas Laurence Roxburgh, 1906–1916
- John Alder Burdon, 1916–1925
- Thomas Reginald St. Johnston, 1925–1929
- Terence Charles Macnaghten, 1929–1931
- Douglas Roy Stewart, 1931–1940
- James Dundas Harford, 1940–1947
- Leslie Stuart Greening, 1947–1949
- Frederick Mitchell Noad, 1949
- Hugh Burrowes, 1949–1956
- Henry Howard, 1956–1966
- Frederick Albert Phillips, 1966–27 February 1967

== Governors of Saint Christopher, Nevis and Anguilla (1967–1980) ==
Standard of the Governor (1967–1980)

In 1967, Saint Christopher, Nevis and Anguilla became an associated state of the United Kingdom, responsible for its own internal affairs.

- Sir Frederick Albert Phillips, 27 February 1967 – 1969, continued
- Sir Milton Pensonville Allen, 1969–1975, acting to August 1972
- Sir Probyn Ellsworth Inniss, 1975–13 April 1980

== Governors of Saint Christopher and Nevis (1980–1983) ==
Standard of the Governor (1980–1983)

In 1980, Anguilla achieved separation, and the state was renamed Saint Christopher and Nevis.

- Sir Probyn Ellsworth Inniss, 13 April 1980 – 26 November 1981, continued
- Clement Athelston Arrindell, November 1981–19 September 1983

On 19 September 1983, Saint Kitts and Nevis achieved independence from the United Kingdom. For a list of viceroys after independence, see Governor-General of Saint Kitts and Nevis.

== See also ==
- List of colonial heads of Nevis
