= Saint Christopher-Nevis-Anguilla =

1882–1983 British colony in the Caribbean Sea

Coordinates: 17°45′N 62°55′W

Saint Christopher-Nevis-Anguilla (1882–1980) Saint Christopher and Nevis (1980–1983)
- 1882–1983
- Flag (1958–1967) (top); Flag (1967–1983) (bottom) Coat of arms
- Motto: "Unity in Trinity"
- Anthem: God Save the Queen (1882–1901; 1952–83); God Save the King (1901–52)
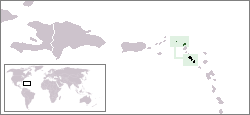
- Location of Saint Christopher-Nevis-Anguilla among the Leeward Islands.
- Status: Colony of the United Kingdom (1882–1967); Associated state of the United Kingdom (1967–1983)
- Capital: Basseterre
- Common languages: English (official); Saint Kitts Creole; Anguillian Creole
- Government: Constitutional monarchy
- Queen
  - 1882–1901 (first): Victoria
  - 1952–83 (last): Elizabeth II
- Governor
  - 1882–1885 (first): Charles Monroe Elridge
  - 1981-1983: Clement A. Arrindell
- Legislature: Legislative Council
- History
  - Established: 16 June 1882
  - Associated State: 27 February 1967
  - Disestablished: 19 September 1983
- Currency: East Caribbean dollar (XCD)
Preceded by
Saint Christopher and Nevis
Anguilla
Succeeded by
Republic of Anguilla
Anguilla
Saint Kitts and Nevis

Saint Christopher-Nevis-Anguilla (or Saint Christopher, Nevis, and Anguilla) was a British colony in the West Indies from 1882 to 1983, consisting of the islands of Anguilla (until 1980), Nevis, and Saint Christopher (or Saint Kitts). From 1882 to 1951, and again from 1980, the colony was known simply as Saint Christopher and Nevis. Saint Christopher and Nevis gained independence in 1983 as the Federation of Saint Kitts and Nevis, while Anguilla remains a British overseas territory.

== History ==
The islands of Saint Christopher and Nevis had been British colonies since the 17th century, but were administered separately until the 1880s. A union of Saint Christopher and Nevis had been proposed as early as 1867, when Captain James George Mackenzie was appointed Lieutenant-Governor of Saint Christopher with a mandate to seek to combine the administrations of the two neighboring islands. This proposal met with strong opposition, however, and was withdrawn the following year. In 1871, Saint Christopher and Nevis became presidencies within the Federal Colony of the Leeward Islands. Anguilla was attached to Saint Christopher as a dependency the same year. In 1882, the Leeward Islands legislature passed legislation merging the two presidencies as the combined Presidency of Saint Christopher and Nevis. In 1951, the name was changed to include Anguilla.

The Leeward Islands Colony was disbanded in 1958, due to frequent tension between its members. From 1958 to 1962, Saint Christopher-Nevis-Anguilla formed a province of the West Indies Federation, electing two members to the House of Representatives and also having two senators, appointed by the Governor-General.

In 1967, the territory of Saint Christopher-Nevis-Anguilla was granted full internal autonomy, as an Associated State of the United Kingdom. The UK retained responsibility for defence and external affairs, while a new judicial system was established, headed by the West Indies Associated States Supreme Court (although the Privy Council remained the highest court of appeal).

Later in 1967, Anguilla's leaders expelled the Federation's police from the island, and declared the island's independence as the Republic of Anguilla. On 7 November 1970, a commission led by Hugh Wooding, former Chief Justice of Trinidad and Tobago, published a report that unanimously rejected both the idea of an independent Anguilla and Anguilla's becoming a separate British colony, and recommended that the island should instead remain a part of Saint Christopher-Nevis-Anguilla. The report was welcomed by Robert Llewellyn Bradshaw while the Council of Anguilla rejected it. Foreign and Commonwealth Office British Minister Joseph Godber stated in the House of Commons of the United Kingdom that his government would analyze the report in light of discussions with all interested parties and that no decision unacceptable to the people of Anguilla would be made. A series of interim agreements followed that resulted in direct rule of the island from Britain, although it was not formally separated from St. Kitts and Nevis until December 1980, when it was made a separate Crown colony.

Nevis had also attempted to separate from the federation on several occasions. The island's leaders were unsuccessful in this effort, they did secure greater autonomy for Nevis in the years leading up to independence, which occurred in September 1983 after a delay of several years to allow for negotiations. Sir Frederick Albert Phillips, the first governor of Saint Christopher-Nevis-Anguilla, wrote in 2013:

It is generally acknowledged that the federation failed on several counts. It failed to live up to the promise of greatly improved administration; it failed to produce economies in the administration of the federating islands as one composite unit; and it failed in that it did not produce any significantly greater output in terms of social development.

== Politics ==
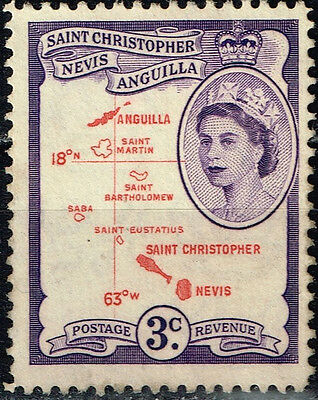
1956 stamp of Saint Christopher-Nevis-Anguilla

=== List of administrators ===
From 1882 to 1958, the federation's administrator was under the wider jurisdiction of the Governor of the Leeward Islands. From 1958 to 1962, the administrator was responsible to the Governor-General of the West Indies Federation.

President

- 1882–83: Alexander Wilson Moir
- 1883–88: Charles Monroe Eldridge (acting to 1885)
- 1888–89: Francis Spencer Wigley (acting)

Commissioner

- 1889–95: John Kemys Spencer-Churchill

Administrator

- 1895–99: Thomas Risely Griffith
- 1899–1904: Charles Thomas Cox
- 1904–06: Sir Robert Bromley
- 1906–16: Thomas Laurence Roxburgh
- 1916–25: John Alder Burdon
- 1925–29: Thomas Reginald St. Johnston
- 1929–31: Terence Charles Macnaghten
- 1931–40: Douglas Roy Stewart
- 1940–47: James Dundas Harford
- 1947–49: Leslie Stuart Greening
- 1949: Frederick Mitchell Noad
- 1949–56: Hugh Burrowes
- 1956–66: Henry Howard
- 1966–67: Sir Frederick Albert Phillips

Governor

- 1967–69: Sir Frederick Albert Phillips
- 1969–75: Sir Milton Pentonville Allen (acting to 1972)
- 1975–81: Sir Probyn Ellsworth Inniss
- 1981–83: Sir Clement Athelston Arrindell

=== List of heads of government ===
Chief Minister

- 1960–66: Caleb Azariah Paul Southwell
- 1966–67: Robert Llewellyn Bradshaw

Premier

- 1967–78: Robert Llewellyn Bradshaw
- 1978–79: Caleb Azariah Paul Southwell
- 1979–80: Sir Lee Llewellyn Moore
- 1980–83: Kennedy Alphonse Simmonds

== Sport and culture ==
The national football team debuted in 1938, in a friendly against Grenada, but played only sporadically. It has played more regularly since independence. In cricket, the Anguilla, Nevis, and Saint Kitts national teams competed separately at regional level, although combined teams were occasionally fielded in the past. Delegations from Saint Christopher-Nevis-Anguilla were sent to several editions of the CARIFTA Games, winning medals in 1977 and 1983. At the 1978 Commonwealth Games in Edmonton, Alberta, Canada, the federation sent four competitors (two runners and two cyclists, all male), but failed to win a medal.

== Notable people ==
- Kelvin Jeffers (born 1963), former British Virgin Islands cricketer
