= Kelvin Jeffers =

British Virgin Islands cricketer (born 1963)

Personal information
- Full name: Kelvin Sylvester Jeffers
- Born: 2 September 1963 (age 63); Nevis
- Batting: Right-handed

Domestic team information
- Years: Team
- 2006–2007/08: British Virgin Islands

Career statistics
Competition	Twenty20
Matches	2
Runs scored	4
Batting average	2.00
100s/50s	–/–
Top score	4
Balls bowled	–
Wickets	–
Bowling average	–
5 wickets in innings	–
10 wickets in match	–
Best bowling	–
Catches/stumpings	2/–
- Source: Cricinfo, 14 January 2013

Kelvin Sylvester Jeffers (born 2 September 1963) is a Nevis-born former British Virgin Islands cricketer. Jeffers was a right-handed batsman.

In 2006, the British Virgin Islands were invited to take part in the 2006 Stanford 20/20, whose matches held official Twenty20 status. Jeffers made a single appearance in the tournament against Saint Lucia in a preliminary round defeat, with him being dismissed for a duck by Alleyn Prospere. He also captained the team in this match. He later played for the team in its second appearance in the Stanford 20/20 in 2008, making a single appearance in a preliminary round defeat against Dominica, where he was dismissed for 4 runs by Mervin Matthew. He didn't captain the team in this match, with the captaincy having passed to Vishal Bharat.
