= Annie Locker-Allen =

- Born: 20 March 1893; Montserrat
- Died: 19 February 1979 (aged 85); Basseterre
- Spouse(s): Milton Allen
- Awards: Member of the Order of the British Empire

Annie Maude Matilda Locker-Allen MBE (20 March 1893 – 19 February 1979) was an educator in Saint Kitts and Nevis. She was the wife of Milton Allen, Governor of the British colony of Saint Christopher-Nevis-Anguilla.

Annie Maude Matilda Locker was born on 20 March 1893 in Montserrat, the eldest daughter of Sergeant Michael Locker of the Leeward Islands Police Force and his wife Ellen. Her family relocated to Saint Kitts when she was twelve. Beginning in 1909, Annie Locker became a student teacher at schools in Dieppe Bay, Sandy Point, and Charlestown. After graduating from Spring Gardens Teachers’ College in Antigua, she became an assistant teacher in Charlestown and head teacher at a school in Dominica. She returned to Saint Kitts to serve as head teacher of the Sandy Point Girls’ School in Charlestown from 1927 to 1944. In 1937, she married Milton Allen and took leaver from her job to accompany him to New York, where she studied at Columbia University. In 1945, Locker-Allen became head teacher of the Basseterre Girls’ School.

In January 1951, Locker-Allen was awarded the Member of the Order of the British Empire. She was the first primary school teacher to be awarded with the MBE.

Annie Locker-Allen died at Joseph N. France General Hospital on 19 February 1979.
