= Alice Lethbridge =

English music hall dancer (1866–1948)

Lady St. Johnston Alice Lethbridge
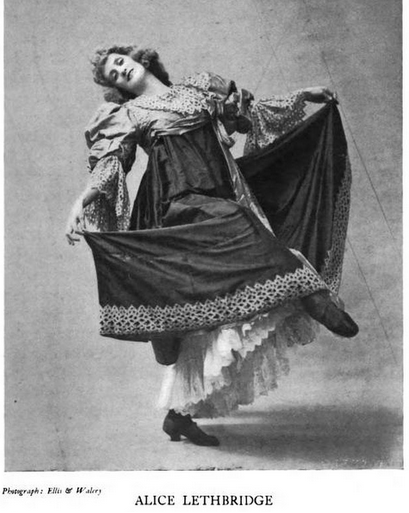
- Alice Lethbridge, from a 1912 publication.
- Born: Alice Matilda Lethbridge; 29 January 1866; Clerkenwell, London, England, UK
- Died: 4 February 1948 (aged 82); Eastbourne, England, UK
- Other names: Alice Turner; Alice St. Johnston
- Occupation: Dancer
- Spouses: Henry Jameson Turner (m. 1889; died 1898) Sir Reginald St. Johnston (m. 1906)

Alice Matilda Lethbridge (29 January 1866 – 4 February 1948) was an English music hall dancer and Gaiety Girl, best known for her "skirt dance" act.

== Early life ==
Alice Matilda Lethbridge was born in Clerkenwell, the daughter of Thomas and Louisa (née Holliday) Lethbridge. Travel writer Grace Marguerite Hay Drummond-Hay was her niece, the daughter of her brother Sidney Lethbridge. Alice Lethbridge studied dance with John D'Auban.

== Career ==
Lethbridge was a Gaiety Girl, best known for performing a "skirt dance", in which she manipulated a voluminous long skirt while dancing, swirling the fabric to reveal glimpses of knees and thighs.

Lethbridge's version of the skirt dance involved arching her back almost to the horizontal, a challenging position that may have inspired similar moves for American dancer Loie Fuller. In 1896 she was described as "the tallest dancer on the English stage".

She was appearing in the musical farce A Man About Town in 1897, when George Bernard Shaw reviewed her work as "sufficiently hard-working and conscientious" but showing "no compensating brilliancy in the twinkling of her feet". Other shows featuring Lethbridge were Mynheer Jan (1887), in which she danced a "vigorous" saltarello, Carina (1888), La Prima Donna (1889), Robert Macaire (1891), Joan of Arc (1891), Cinder-Ellen (1892), Little Christopher Columbus (1894), and Baron Golosh (1895). She toured in Australia and North America in the 1890s.

== Personal life ==
Alice Lethbridge married actor Henry Jameson Turner in 1889. She was widowed when he died soon after. She married again in 1906, to author and diplomat Sir Reginald St Johnston. She died in 1948, aged 82.
