= Stedman Rawlins =

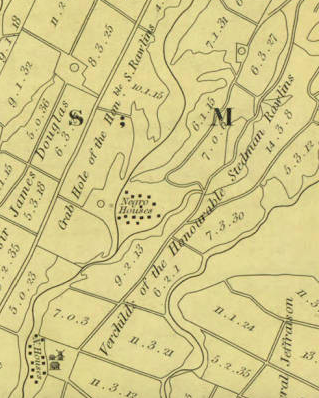
Hon. Stedman Rawlins plantations and Negro houses, island of Saint Christopher, 1828 (inset)

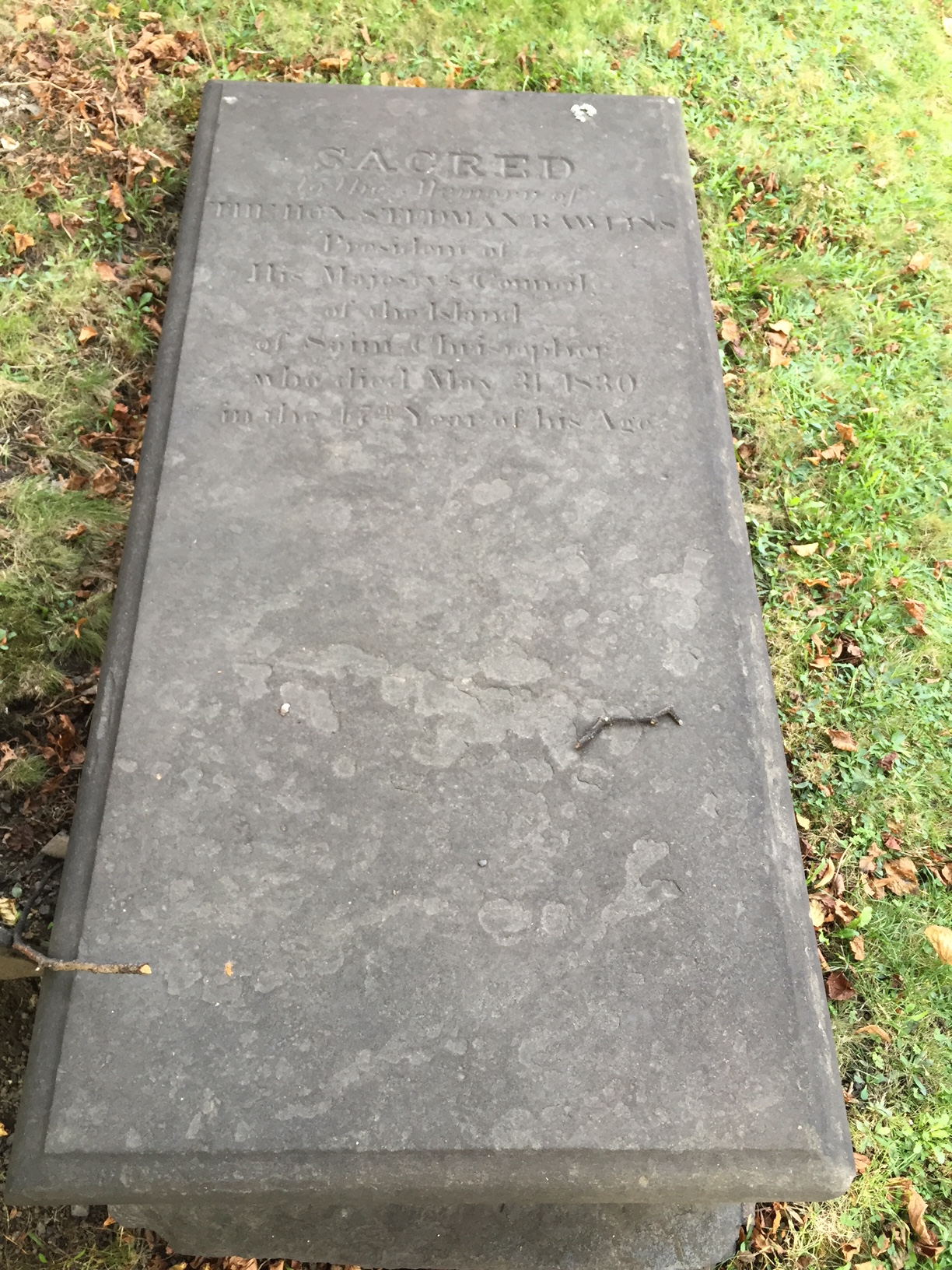
Hon Stedman Rawlins, Old Burying Ground (Halifax, Nova Scotia)

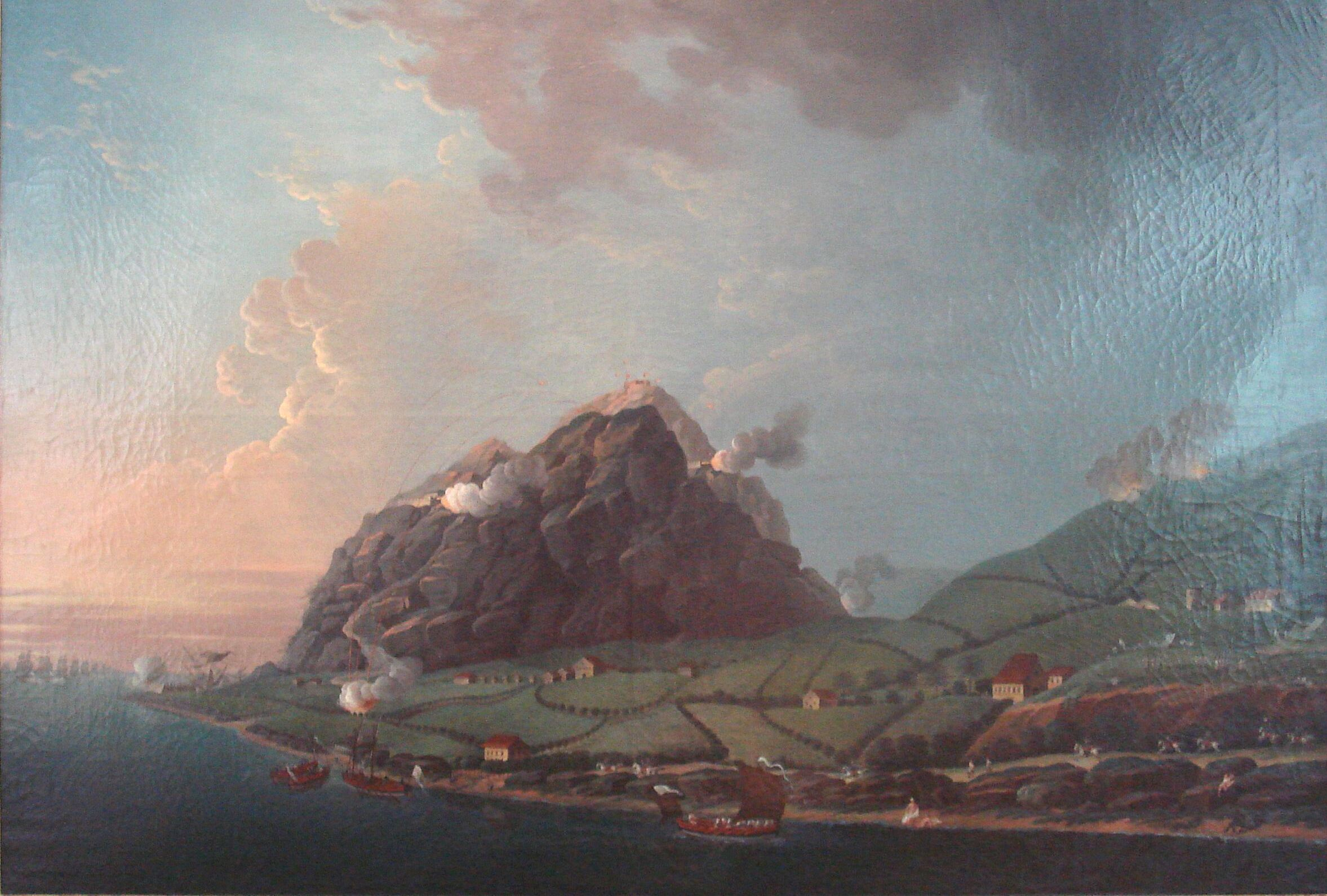
One of the Rawlins' plantations (left), St. Kitts (1782)

Hon. Stedman Rawlins (c. 1784–1830) was a slaveholder and sugar plantation owner, and the President of His Majesty's Council, on the Caribbean island of Saint Kitts.

== Life ==
He was born in the Caribbean and baptized at Trinity Anglican Church, Trinity Palmetto Point Parish. He matriculated at Christ Church, Oxford in 1801.

Rawlins became a profitable slave owner in Saint Thomas Middle Island Parish, just as his father, Stedman Rawlins Sr. (b.1749), had been. The French used one of the Rawlins Sr. plantations to bomb British fortifications on Brimstone Hill during the American Revolution. Rawlins Jr. married Gertrude Tyson circa 1805. England outlawed the slave trade in 1807.

Rawlins became the Governor of Saint Christopher in 1816. He owned the Verchild's and the Crab Hole plantations. Rawlins was one of the magistrates that ruled against slave Betto Douglas's complaint of cruelty, returning her to her master after he had kept her in stocks for 7 months in 1826. Rawlins was the President of His Majesty's Council on St. Christopher. Missionary accounts indicate that he encouraged missionaries to preach to the slaves in the President's hall. In 1827, Rawlins became the acting Governor of St. Kitts. He was charged with the selling of criminal slaves, even after the slave trade had been abolished.

He had a daughter, Mary Rawlins who went on to marry John Satterthwaite who worked in colonial trade.

He went to Halifax, Nova Scotia, and died there, being buried in the Old Burying Ground in 1830. Rawlins's obituary reads that he was at St. Christopher, "where he was much respected. He had recently come to this country [Nova Scotia] in the hope of restoring his constitution, debilitated by a long residence in the West Indies."

Three years later, the Slavery Abolition Act 1833 outlawed slavery all together in the British empire.

== See also ==
- Slavery in the British and French Caribbean
- List of slave owners

== Other readings ==
- Dyde B 2005, 'Out of the Crowded Vagueness: A History of the Islands of St Kitts, Nevis and Anguilla', Macmillan Caribbean, Oxford.
- Hubbard VK 2002 'A History of St Kitts: the Sweet Trade', Oxford.
