= Prospere =

Prospere is a surname. Notable people with the surname include:

- Alleyn Prospere (born 1979), Saint Lucian cricketer
- Alfred Prospere, Saint Lucian politician

Jean Prosper Guivier (1814–1862), French musician, was known as Prospère
