= Admiral Mackenzie =

Admiral Mackenzie may refer to:

- Hugh Mackenzie (Royal Navy officer) (1913–1996), British Royal Navy vice admiral
- James George Mackenzie (c. 1803–1879), British Royal Navy rear admiral
- Thomas Mackenzie (Royal Navy officer) (1753–1813)
- Thomas MacKenzie (Russian admiral) (1740–1786), Imperial Russian Navy rear admiral
