= Frederick Albert Phillips =

Kittitian politician and jurist

Sir Frederick Albert Phillips CVO (14 May 1918 – 20 February 2011) was a Kittitian politician and jurist who served as the first black Governor of Saint Christopher-Nevis-Anguilla from February 27, 1967 to 1969.

== Career ==
Prior to serving as governor he served as Cabinet Secretary in the West Indies Federation from 1962 to 1965 and Administrator from 1966 to 1967.

He was also assistant registrar at the University of the West Indies from 1966 to 1967 and chairman of the US Agency for International Development of Agricultural Venture Trust until 1986. He was a legal advisor to Cable & Wireless and chairman of Grenada Telecommunications Limited, Telecoms of Dominica and the Jamaica Telephone Company, as well as a director of a number of other companies and organisations. He was also a consultant to Richards and Associates Law firm in Antigua and was appointed Chairman in 1999 to the Constitution Review Commission, which had been given the task of reviewing Antigua & Barbuda's 1981 constitution and other laws.

He wrote a number of books on Constitutional Law and Legal Ethics including:

- West Indian Constitutions Post Independence Reform
- Caribbean Life and Culture — A citizen reflects
- The Evolving Legal Profession in the Commonwealth
- The Death Penalty and Human Rights
- Freedom in the Caribbean — A Study of Constitutional Change
- Commonwealth Law Series — Commonwealth Caribbean Constitutional Law

He also wrote chapter 20 of the 2010 publication of the book, Judicial House of Lords 1879 to 2009, which was titled Reflection From The New Commonwealth.

== Death ==
Phillips died at his home in Hodges Bay, Antigua on 20 February 2011 after a long illness at the age of 92.

== Honours and awards ==
- 1966: Awarded a Guggenheim Fellowship.
- 1966: Invested as a Commander of the Royal Victorian Order.
- 1967: Knighted in November 1967.

Government offices
Preceded by Henry Howard	Governor of Saint Kitts and Nevis; 1967–1969	Succeeded by Milton Allen
