= William Cairns =

British colonial administrator (1828-1888)

Sir William Wellington Cairns KCMG
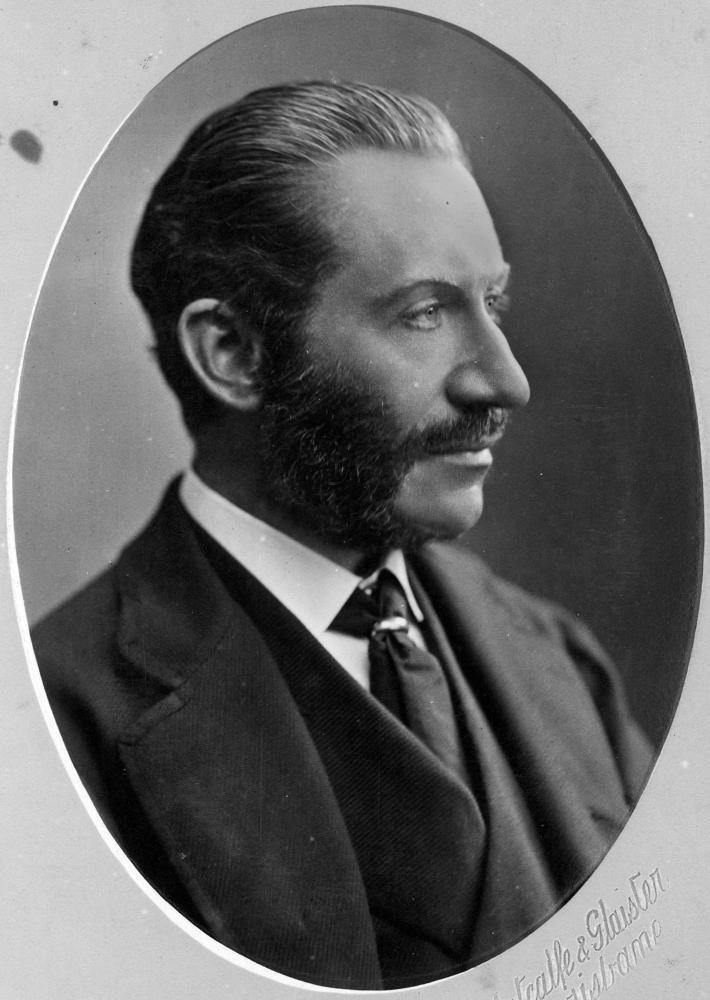

Governor of Trinidad
- In office 2 May 1874 – 27 May 1874
- Monarch: Queen Victoria
- Preceded by: James Robert Longden
- Succeeded by: Henry Turner Irving

4th Governor of Queensland
- In office 23 January 1875 – 14 March 1877
- Monarch: Queen Victoria
- Preceded by: George Phipps, 2nd Marquess of Normanby
- Succeeded by: Sir Arthur Edward Kennedy

Personal details
- Born: 3 March 1828 County Down, Ireland, UK
- Died: 7 July 1888 (aged 60) London, England, UK

Sir William Wellington Cairns, KCMG (3 March 1828 – 7 July 1888) was a British colonial administrator. He was the Governor of Queensland and the Governor of Trinidad.

== Early life ==
Cairns was born in Belfast, Ireland on 3 March 1828 (as indicated on his grave stone). His parents were William Cairns, a property owner at Cultra, County Down and was a captain in the 14th Regiment, and his second marriage Matilda Beggs, daughter of Francis Beggs of the Grange, Malahide.

== Trinidad and Australia ==
He served in various senior colonial civil service posts in the British Empire including Trinidad, moving due to health issues, before being appointed Governor of Queensland in January 1875. He held the post for two years before becoming the Administrator of South Australia in 1877. Cairns was given a CMG in 1874, followed by a knighthood in 1877.

Later reflections of his contributions to colonial public life were not considered highly:

Of all the pestilent "returned colonists" who misrepresent things Australian in London perhaps not one is equal as a nuisance to a retired Australian Governor.

== Return ==
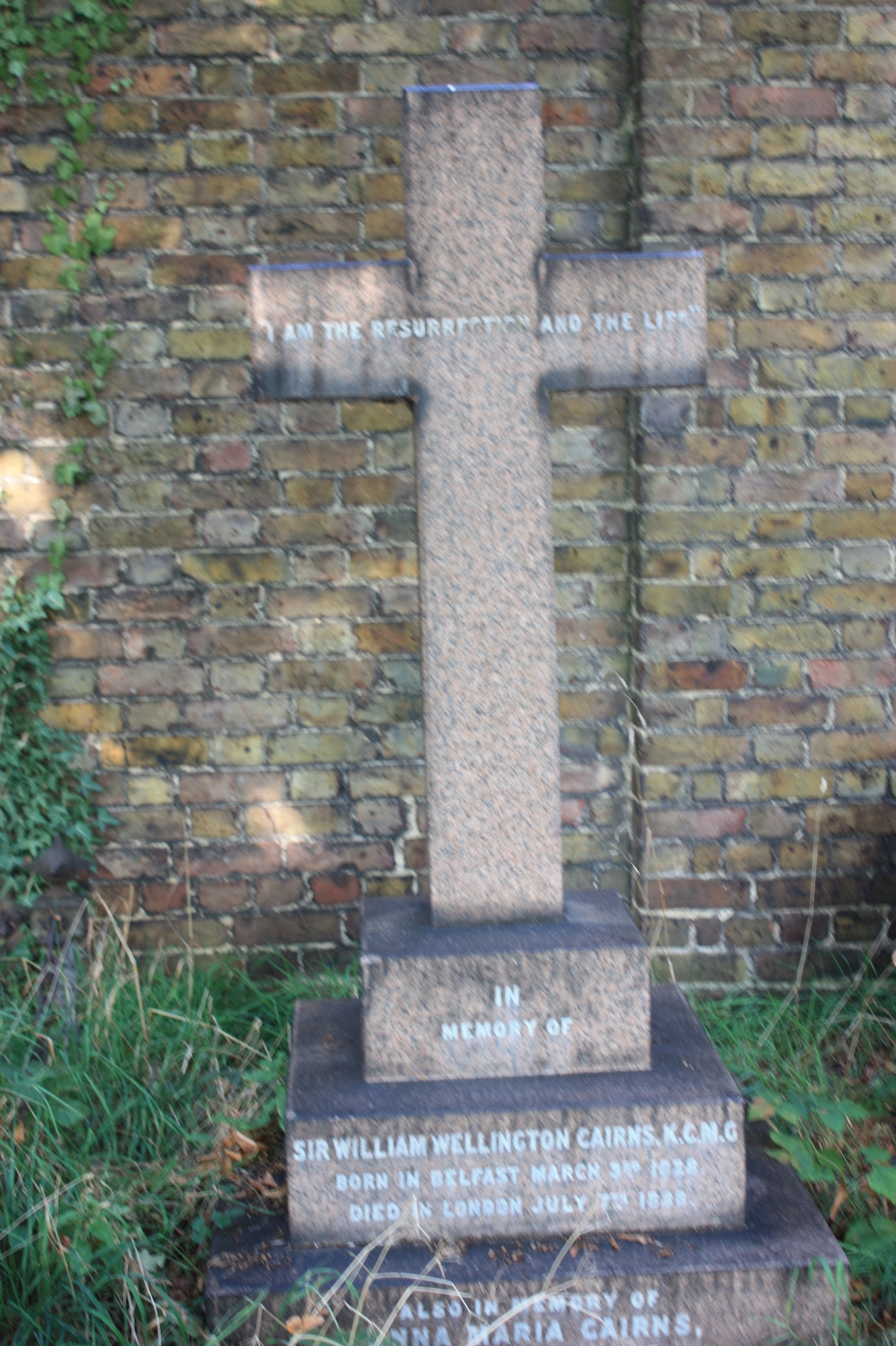
The grave of William Wellington Cairns, Brompton Cemetery, London

He subsequently returned to England where he died in London on 7 July 1888, unmarried. He is buried in a modest grave against the east wall of Brompton Cemetery near the north-east corner with Anna Maria Cairns, his sister.

== Legacy ==
The city of Cairns in Queensland was named after him in 1876.

Government offices
| Preceded by Frederick Lyon Playfair | Lieutenant Governor of Malacca; 1867 – 1869 | Succeeded by Edward Wingfield Shaw |
| Preceded by James George Mackenzie | Lieutenant Governor of Saint Christopher; 1869 – 1870 | Succeeded by Francis Spencer Wigley as President of Saint Christopher |
| Preceded by James Robert Longden | Lieutenant Governor of British Honduras; 1870 – 1874 | Succeeded by Robert Miller Mundy |
| Preceded by James Robert Longden | Governor of Trinidad; 1874 | Succeeded by Henry Turner Irving |
| Preceded by George Phipps, 2nd Marquess of Normanby | Governor of Queensland; 1875 – 1877 | Succeeded by Sir Arthur Edward Kennedy |
| Preceded by Richard Davies Hanson | Administrator of South Australia; 1877 | Succeeded by Samuel James Way |
