= Kate Vaughan =

British dancer and actress (1855–1903)

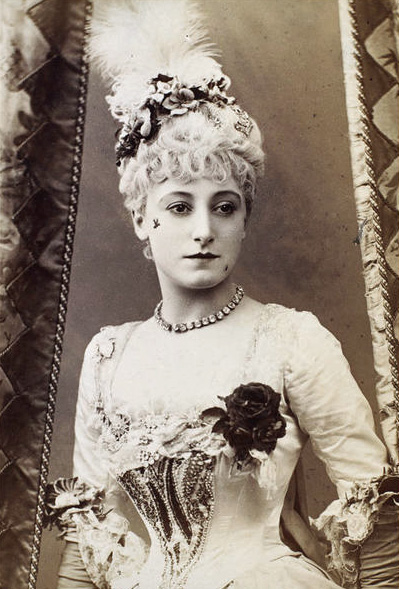
As Lady Teazle in The School for Scandal, 1886

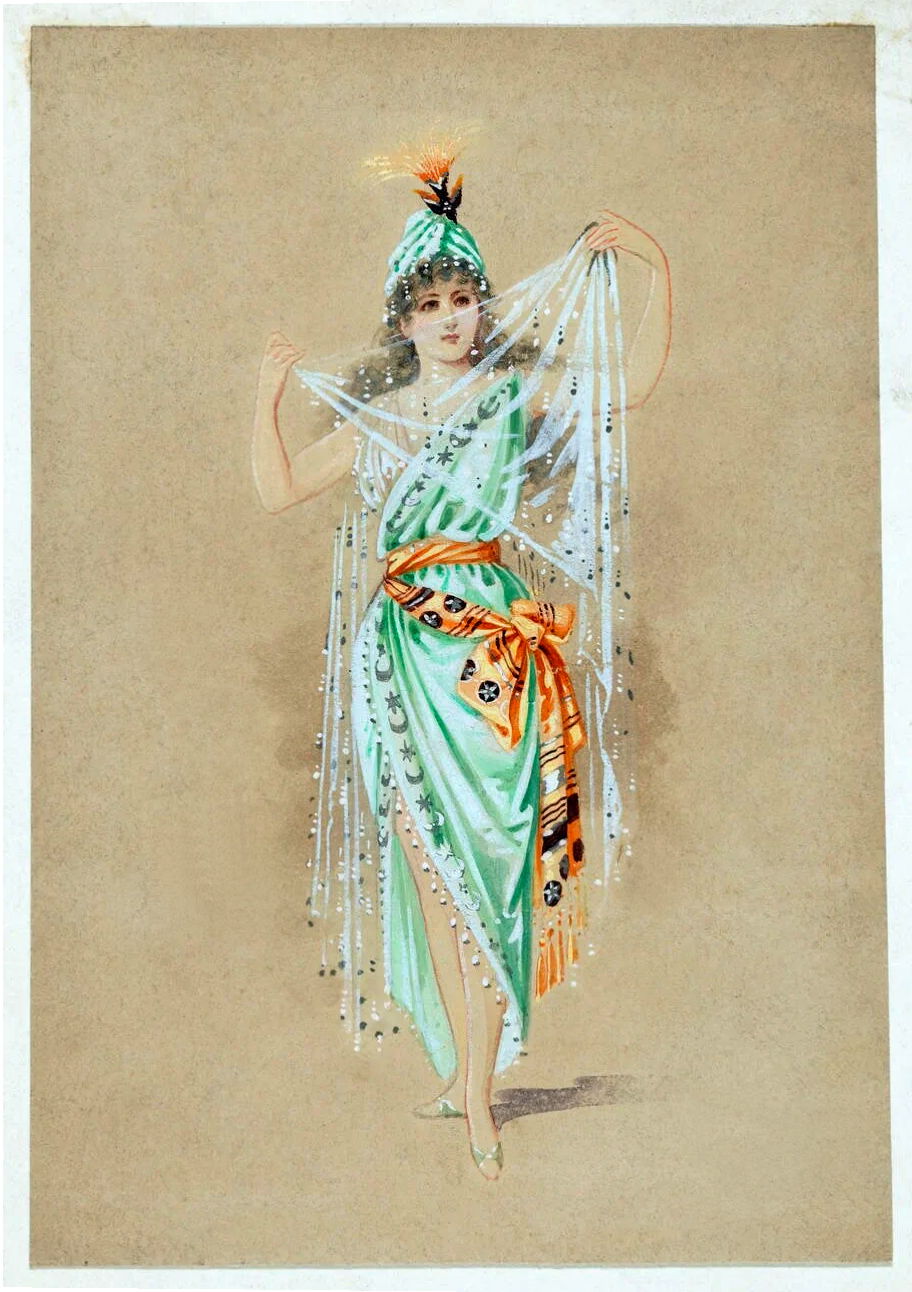
In a gown by Wilhelm, 1892

Programme for Vaughan's 1887 production of The Rivals

Kate Vaughan (16 August 1855 – 22 February 1903) was the stage name of Catherine Alice Candelin, (Note: Vaughan chose to give a later year for her date of birth: Who's Who in the Theatre prints her age as four years younger than it was.) a British dancer and actress. She was best known for developing the skirt dance and has been called the "greatest dancer of her time".

After performing as a young girl, Vaughan had a seven-year engagement at the Gaiety Theatre in London from 1876 to 1883, where she joined its Victorian burlesque troupe that included Nellie Farren and Edward Terry. In 1884 she married Colonel the Hon Frederick Arthur Wellesley, youngest son of the 1st Earl Cowley. She retired from dancing in 1885 and soon began to tour in classic comedies with considerable success. From about 1896 her health began to deteriorate, but she continued to perform until her death.

== Life and career ==
Vaughan was born in London; as a young girl she appeared on stage in the West End, where her father (James Matthias Candelin) was an orchestral musician. She is associated with the development of the skirt dance, which she performed as part of an 1873 production of Orpheus in the Underworld. She appeared with her sister Susie as the Vaughan Sisters. The skirt dance was a demure version of the can-can, and it was performed with long skirts made from large lengths of material. After she had retired from dancing she described her technique to an interviewer:

I was the first to dance in skirts reaching the ankles; I never went in for serpentine dances, trailing garments, or movements of the arms and the whole body – mine was genuine dancing and nothing else. I invented the steps myself, and my full-length lace skirts were a novelty in those days, when the ballet was the only style in vogue.

In 1876 her main work was at John Hollingshead's Gaiety Theatre in London, where she was employed for the next seven years. This was a time when Nellie Farren, Edward O'Connor Terry and E. W. Royce were the stars at the theatre, particularly in Victorian burlesque. In June 1884 Vaughan married Colonel the Hon Frederick Arthur Wellesley, the youngest son of 1st Earl of Cowley; she was the second of Wellesley's three wives. The marriage ended in 1897. After a break she reappeared on stage in the summer of 1885, where she did a short cameo appearance for just two well-received minutes each night. At the height of her career she was being paid £72 a week to appear as a dancer.

After this she retired from dancing; the skirt dance had become so fashionable that it was said that every young lady needed to have it in her repertoire. Vaughan reinvented herself as a successful comedy actress. From 1886 she toured and played London seasons in new productions of classic English comedies including She Stoops to Conquer and The Rivals, heading a company that included Charles Collette, Lionel Brough and Johnston Forbes-Robertson. By 1889 she had, according to The Times, attained a unique position as an actress of classic comedy.

Vaughan left her husband in 1892, and in 1897 he successfully sued for divorce. There were no children of the marriage. From about 1896 her health began to deteriorate, and on medical advice she spent some time in Australia in that year. Vaughan died in 1903 in Johannesburg, South Africa, during an unsuccessful tour starting in Cape Town. She was buried in Braamfontein cemetery in Johannesburg where one of her pall bearers was her former colleague at the Gaiety, Edward Terry.

== Reputation ==
Her biographer, W. J. Lawrence, calls Vaughan "the greatest dancer of her century" so far as "grace, magnetism, and spirituality" are concerned. In 1906 Sir Reginald St Johnston wrote of her in his book A History of Dancing:

As the pioneer of a new style of dancing, as the inventor, the creator, of all that is best in the dancing of to-day, she would alone have been worth all the admiration and praise we can bestow upon her. But when in addition we remember that her dancing was so superb, so graceful, and so artistic, that in a moment it could sweep aside all the rooted prejudice of years in favour of ballet dancing, and could assert its superiority by sheer force of its own merits, we must unhesitatingly place Kate Vaughan as the greatest dancer of her time.

== Notes, references and sources ==
=== Sources ===
- Gaye, Freda, ed. (1967). Who's Who in the Theatre (fourteenth ed.). London: Sir Isaac Pitman and Sons. OCLC 5997224.
- Jupp, James (1923). The Gaiety Stage Door. London: Jonathan Cape. OCLC 254418097.
- St Johnston, Reginald (1906). A History of Dancing. London: Simpkin, Marshall, Hamilton and Kent. OCLC 1116345.
