= Governor Allen =

Governor Allen may refer to:

- Charles Herbert Allen (1848–1934), Civil Governor of Puerto Rico
- Frank G. Allen (1874–1950), Governor of Massachusetts
- George Allen (American politician) (born 1952), Governor of Virginia
- Henry J. Allen (1868–1950), Governor of Kansas
- Henry Watkins Allen (1820–1866), Governor of Louisiana
- Oscar K. Allen (1882–1936), Governor of Louisiana
- Philip Allen (Rhode Island politician) (1785–1865), Governor of Rhode Island
- William Allen (governor) (1803–1879), Governor of Ohio
- Milton Allen (1888–1981), Governor of Saint Christopher-Nevis-Anguilla

== See also ==
- William Allain (1928–2013), Governor of Mississippi
- Colin Allan (1921–1993), 7th Governor of the Solomon Islands and 19th Governor of the Seychelles
- Roger Allin (1848–1936), Governor of North Dakota
