= Clement Arrindell =

Governor of Saint Kitts and Nevis (1931–2011)

His Excellency Sir Clement Arrindell GCMG GCVO QC

1st Governor-General of Saint Kitts and Nevis (Note: The country was officially known as Saint Christopher and Nevis until 26 November 1986.)
- In office 19 September 1983 – 31 December 1995
- Monarch: Elizabeth II
- Prime Minister: Sir Kennedy Simmonds; Denzil Douglas
- Preceded by: Office Established; Himself as Governor
- Succeeded by: Sir Cuthbert Sebastian

Governor of Saint Kitts and Nevis
- In office 26 November 1981 – 19 September 1983
- Monarch: Elizabeth II
- Premier: Sir Kennedy Simmonds
- Preceded by: Sir Probyn Inniss
- Succeeded by: Office Abolished; Himself as Governor General

Personal details
- Born: 16 April 1931 Basseterre, Saint Kitts, British Leeward Islands
- Died: 26 March 2011 (aged 79)
- Spouse: Evelyn O'Loughlyn

Sir Clement Athelston Arrindell GCMG GCVO QC (19 April 1931 – 27 March 2011) was the first governor-general of Saint Kitts and Nevis, serving from 1983 to 1995, and also served as the country's final colonial governor, from 1981 to 1983.

Arrindell was born in Basseterre, Saint Kitts, and educated at the St. Kitts–Nevis Grammar School, where he was top of his class in his final year. He left to study in England in 1954, and was called to the bar in June 1958, as a member of Lincoln's Inn. Arrindell returned to Saint Kitts in December 1958. He initially worked in private practice, but was eventually made a magistrate. From 1972 to 1978, he served as a senior magistrate, both in Saint Christopher-Nevis-Anguilla (as the colony was then known) and in the British Virgin Islands. In July 1978, Arrindell was made a judge of the West Indies Associated States Supreme Court (now known as the Eastern Caribbean Supreme Court). He served in the position until November 1981, when he succeeded Sir Probyn Inniss as Governor of Saint Kitts and Nevis (an Associated State of the United Kingdom at the time). On independence in September 1983, he was appointed governor-general, and remained in the position until his retirement in December 1995. Arrindell was created a Knight Bachelor in the 1982 Birthday Honours, and was also later made a Knight Grand Cross of the Order of St Michael and St George (GCMG) in February 1984 and a Knight Grand Cross of the Royal Victorian Order (GCVO) in October 1985. He died in March 2011, after a short illness, and was awarded a state funeral.

== Notes ==
Government offices
Preceded by Sir Probyn Inniss	Governor of Saint Christopher and Nevis; 1981–1983	Post abolished
New creation	Governor-General of Saint Kitts and Nevis; 1983–1995	Succeeded by Sir Cuthbert Sebastian
