= Skirt dance =

Form of dance

A skirt dance is a form of dance popular in Europe and the United States, particularly in burlesque and vaudeville theater of the 1890s, in which women dancers would manipulate long, layered skirts with their arms to create a motion of flowing fabric, often in a darkened theater with colored light projectors highlighting the patterns of their skirts. Skirts used in skirt dances reportedly were constructed from over 100 yards of fabric.

== Background ==
Letty Lind performing a skirt dance in 1890

The dance originated in London, as a less formal type of ballet with elements of popular dance such as clogging and French can-can. The dancer Kate Vaughan is generally credited with originating it, and being its early proponent, after performing the dance as part of a Dance of the Furies at the Holborn Theatre in 1873. Vaughan had also performed Jacques Offenbach's Orpheus in the Underworld in a similar dress that year. Ballet master and choreographer John D'Auban worked with Vaughan, and taught other students including Alice Lethbridge, how to perform skirt dances.

The dance soon became popular at the Gaiety Theatre in London, where it was routinely performed by the theatre's chorus line, the "Gaiety Girls".
