= John Kemys Spencer-Churchill =

John Kemys Spencer-Churchill CMG

Personal details
- Born: 27 December 1835 London, England
- Died: 9 August 1913 (aged 77) Falmouth, England
- Spouse: Edith Maxwell Lockhart

Military service
- Allegiance: United Kingdom
- Branch/service: British Army
- Years of service: 1854-
- Battles/wars: Siege of Sebastapol

John Kemys George Thomas Spencer-Churchill CMG (27 December 1835 – 9 August 1913) was an administrator in the British colonial service serving as Governor of Montserrat and Commissioner of St Kitts and Nevis.

Spencer-Churchill was the second son of Lord Charles Spencer-Churchill born on 27 December 1835. He was educated at Winchester College and joined the Army in 1854 serving at the siege of Sebastapol.

After leaving the Army he joined the colonial service in the West Indies where he held a number of administrative appointments, including President of the British Virgin Islands from 1879 to 1882, Governor of Montserrat from 1888 to 1889 and Commissioner of St Kitts and Nevis from 1889 to 1895.

== Family life ==
Spencer-Churchill married Edith Maxwell Lockhart in 1881 He died at Falmouth on 9 August 1913, aged 78.

Government offices
Preceded by Richard Mahoney Hickson	President of the British Virgin Islands; 1879–1882	Succeeded by Richard Henry Kortright Dyett
Preceded by new position	Governor of Montserrat; 1888–1889	Succeeded by Edward Baynes
Preceded by new position	Commissioner of St Kitts and Nevis; 1889–1895	Succeeded by abolished
