= Probyn Inniss =

His Excellency Sir Probyn Inniss MBE

Governor of Saint Christopher-Nevis-Anguilla
- In office 1 August 1975 – 13 April 1980
- Monarch: Elizabeth II
- Premier: Robert Bradshaw; Paul Southwell; Sir Lee Moore; Sir Kennedy Simmonds
- Preceded by: Sir Milton Allen
- Succeeded by: None (office abolished)

Governors of Saint Christopher, Nevis and Anguilla
- In office 13 April 1980 – 26 November 1981
- Monarch: Elizabeth II
- Premier: Sir Kennedy Simmonds
- Preceded by: None (new creation)
- Succeeded by: Sir Clement Arrindell

Personal details
- Born: 18 November 1936 Saint Kitts, British Leeward Islands
- Died: 12 March 2017 (aged 80)

Sir Probyn Ellsworth Inniss MBE (18 November 1936 – 12 March 2017) was the Governor of Saint Christopher-Nevis-Anguilla from 1975 to 1980, and then, following the separation of Anguilla, the Governor of Saint Christopher and Nevis from 1980 to 1981.

== Early life ==
Inniss was born in Saint Kitts, where he attended secondary school, and went on to study at the University College of West Indies, graduating in 1961. After working as a schoolteacher for a period, he went to England to study law, eventually being called to the bar as a member of the Middle Temple. He entered the civil service on returning to Saint Kitts, and in June 1967 was made a Member of the Order of the British Empire (MBE) for his work.

== Governorship ==
In August 1975, Inniss succeeded Sir Milton Allen as Governor of Saint Christopher-Nevis-Anguilla, an Associated State of the United Kingdom. In connection with his appointment, he was created a Knight Bachelor in the 1976 New Year Honours, and was personally invested by Queen Elizabeth II in July of the same year.

During his term in office, there were three changes in government, with Robert Bradshaw, Paul Southwell, Sir Lee Moore, and Sir Kennedy Simmonds all serving as premier at various stages.

In 1981, Inniss refused assent to a bill that had been passed by the Simmonds government, in the belief that it was unconstitutional. Simmonds consequently wrote to Elizabeth II to request the removal of his commission as governor, which occurred in November of that year.

== Later life ==
After leaving office, Inniss returned to the legal profession, setting up his own firm. He also authored books on the history of Saint Kitts, specifically on the history of Basseterre and of the Saint Kitts and Nevis Labour Party.

Government offices
Preceded by Sir Milton Allen	Governor of Saint Christopher-Nevis-Anguilla; 1975–1980	Post abolished
New creation	Governor of Saint Christopher and Nevis; 1980–1981	Succeeded by Sir Clement Arrindell
