= Betto Douglas =

Betto Douglas (also known as Elizabeth Douglas, c. 1772 – ?) was a slave on St. Kitts, at the time a British Colony. What is known of her life illuminates the practice slavery in the Caribbean and the efforts of abolitionist societies to free them. Douglas is an iconic figure of resistance to slavery in the country and her story is featured in the National Museum of Saint Kitts and Nevis. In Britain, she is included on the initial slave register for St. Kitts and kept in the Central Slave Registries at the British National Archives, which are enrolled in the UNESCO Memory of the World Registry.

== History ==
Betto Douglas was born around 1772 to a white father and enslaved mother on Wingfield Manor Estate in St. Kitts. She was listed on the initial slave register for St. Kitts, which was compiled in 1817, as a mulatto woman, aged forty-five with two children, Cleisby and Sawney Frazer. She was the property of the Earl of Romney, an absentee landlord of the estate on St. Kitts. While John George Goldfrap was the agent for the 2nd Earl, Douglas asked to purchase the freedom of her two sons. Goldfrap wrote to the Earl on Douglas' behalf and received a letter that he would allow her to be manumitted, indicating he had instructed his new agent, Rev. Davis to take the necessary measures.

After several years had passed without them being emancipated, a new overseer, Richard Cardin, was hired on the estate. Cardin hired out Douglas requiring her to pay a fee of three and a half dollars per month from her earnings for the small house she lived in and her daily food allowance. Douglas complained that the fee was too high and given the economic times, indicated no one would pay such a fee for her services. She often went into arrears or had to borrow the funds, but she refused to engage in illegal behavior, like thievery or prostitution to acquire the monies. After several years passed without the emancipation being procured, Douglas petitioned Governor Charles William Maxwell in 1825. Maxwell made inquiry and procured statements from both Douglas and Cardin. Douglas claimed that when she was unable to pay the fee, Cardin withheld food from her and locked her in the stocks for seven months. She stated that he threatened her with imprisonment for failure to pay and ordered her to be lashed, so she ran away. Cardin confirmed the terms of Douglas' hire fees, difficulty in paying and that she had been placed in the stocks, but insisted that Douglas had been provided food daily from the estate, which she refused because she was being punished. Cardin stated that her family had provided her with daily food and that she was allowed out of the stocks when she needed to bathe in the river. At the completion of the inquiry, the grand jury's decision was that Douglas had been insubordinate, that they could not determine that her punishment had been excessive, and she was ordered to return to the estate.

Transmitting the findings to Lord Bathurst, Governor Maxwell stated that Douglas’ treatment had been illegal, but that it was customary in the island and "considered justifiable and proper". Bathurst noted that no witnesses favorable to Douglas had been called and expressed his disapproval that the punishment inflicted upon her was disproportionate to her offense. As she did not feel she had received justice, Douglas then took her case in 1827 to the colonial courts. Her case was taken up by abolitionists world-wide. The Anti-Slavery Reporter began covering the case in 1827 in London. The courts reviewed the case and reprimanded Douglas for injuring the reputation of Cardin. Returned again to the estate, she was again confined to the stocks for a period of six months and eleven days. The Female Society for the Relief of British Negro Slaves collected funds in 1830 to try to buy her freedom, but were refused by the Lord Proprietor. South African, Thomas Pringle first wrote about her in 1832 in his journal, the Anti-Slavery Record and a year later was still writing about the refusal to grant her emancipation. Douglas was finally granted manumission three months before the Abolition Act passed in July 1833.

== Legacy ==
Douglas' case shows that even when slaves utilized legal remedies to obtain relief, the justice system often failed to protect them. The elderly woman was subjected to contradictions in the law, which treated her case as if she was a public nuisance under colonial customs, rather than someone who should have been protected by British law. Her testimony also shows that she was familiar with legal concepts as well as the economic functioning of the slave system, bringing to light the complex nature of slave relationships with their owners.

In St. Kitts, Douglas is viewed as an icon of those who resisted slavery and fought for their emancipation. Her story has been featured in the National Museum of St. Kitts and Nevis and is regularly featured in presentations about the island's history. In Britain, she is included on initial register for St. Kitts, which was compiled in 1817, and kept in the Central Slave Registries at the British National Archives, which were enrolled in the UNESCO Memory of the World Registry in 2008 for preservation.
