= Slavery in the British and French Caribbean =

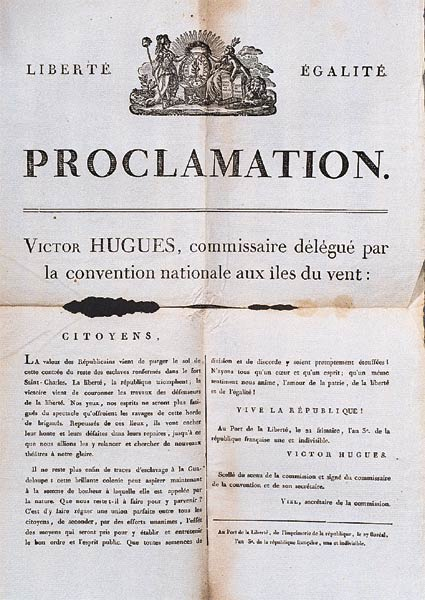
Emancipation proclamation of Guadeloupe

Slavery in the British and French Caribbean refers to slavery in the parts of the Caribbean dominated by the French Empire or the British Empire.

== History ==
In the Caribbean, England colonised the islands of St. Kitts and Barbados in 1623 and 1627 respectively, and later, Jamaica in 1655. In these islands and England's other Caribbean colonies, white colonists would gradually introduce a system of slave-based labor to underpin a new economy based on cash crop production.

=== French Institution of Slavery ===
In the mid-16th century, slaves were trafficked from Africa to the Caribbean by Europeans. Originally, white European indentured servants worked alongside enslaved Africans in the Americas. François Bernier, who is considered to have presented the first modern concept of race, published his work “A New Division of the Earth according to the Different Species or Races of Men Who Inhabit It” in 1684, over 100 years after slaves were brought to the "New World" (the Americas), including Haiti.

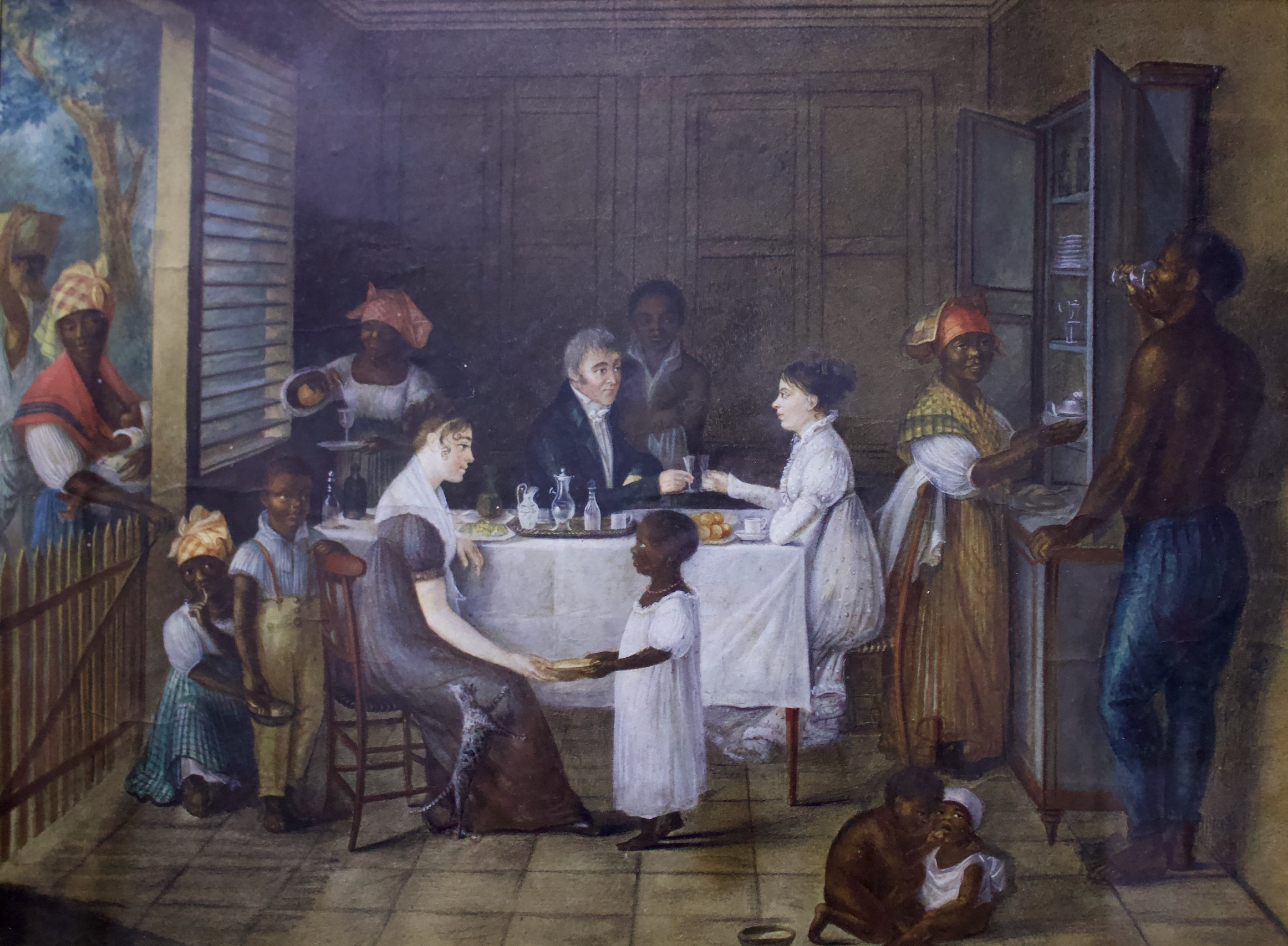
Black slaves serving in a house of Martinique, early 19th century

As of 1778, French slave trade transported approximately 13,000 Africans as slaves to the French West Indies as well as Saint-Domingue each year. Slavery had been active in French colonies since the early 16th century; it was first abolished by the French government in 1794, whereupon it was replaced by forced labour before being reinstated by Napoleon in 1802. The French slave trade ran along a triangular route, wherein ships would travel from France to colonized African countries, and then to the Caribbean colonies. The triangular setup was intentional, as France aimed to bring the African laborers to the New World, where their labor was of higher value because of the natural and cheap resources cultivated from the land, and then bring the product back to France. In French, the commerce triangulaire referred to this Atlantic economy based on the trafficking of slaves from Africa.

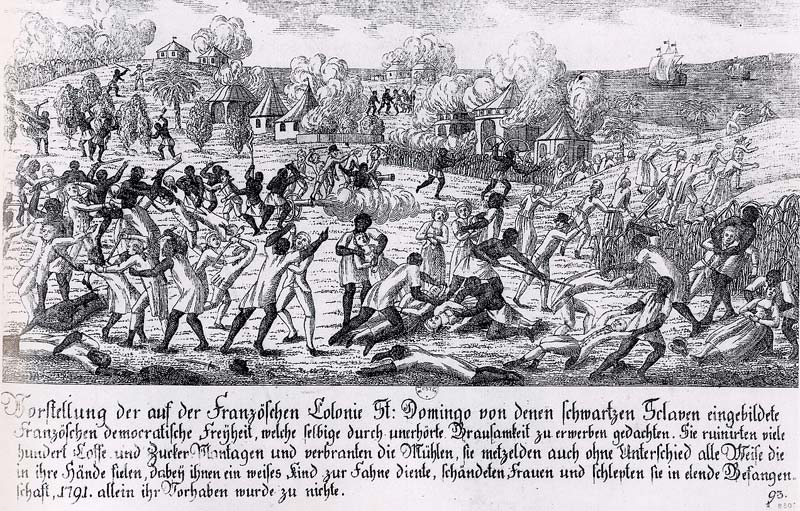
Saint-Domingue slave revolt in 1791

In France, the slaving interest was based in Nantes, La Rochelle, Bordeaux, and Le Havre during the years 1763 to 1792. The men involved defended their business against the abolition movement of 1789. They were merchants who specialized in funding and directing cargoes of stolen Black captives to the Caribbean colonies, which had high death rates. Caribbean plantations relied on a continuous supply of newly trafficked slaves. Slaveholding plantation owners were strongly opposed to the application of the Declaration of the Rights of Man and of the Citizen to Black people. While they ridiculed the slaves as "dirty" and "savage", they often took a Black mistress (an enslaved woman forced into sexual services). The French government paid a bounty on each captive sold to the colonies, which made the business profitable and patriotic.

=== Slave trade ===
Slaves, wealth and goods were moved in an insular, unidirectional fashion to the exclusive benefit of Europe. In fact, the French had a policy called “the Exclusif” (exclusive in English), requiring French colonies to only sell exports to France and purchase imported goods from France. This promoted the concept of “centripetal trade” in which all profit and capital spread amongst the American colonies eventually circulated back into the hands of European powers. The trafficking of slaves was just one fraction of the mercantilist economy. In addition, Europeans brought “pacotille” or “cheaply made European goods” to trade with Africans. This often took the form of colonial products such as sugar, rum, tobacco, coffee, or indigo. Thus African leaders, who themselves were in control of selling African captives with Europeans, did not retain the wealth they acquired in the trafficking of slaves. Rather they were the targeted customers of poorly-made pacotille. Their profits from the trafficking in slaves then circled back to manufacturers in Europe, just as the Exclusif had intended.

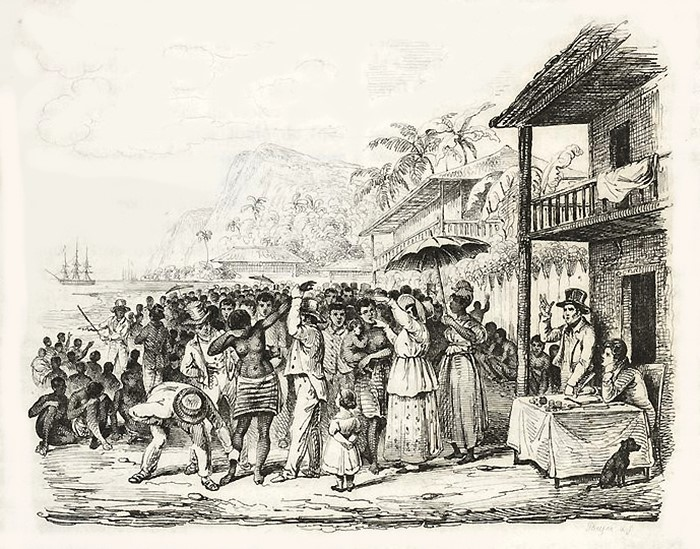
Slave market in Martinique, 1826, by Julien-Léopold Boilly

The French trans-Atlantic trafficking of slaves has qualities of both an economy of trade and traite. Many historians consider the trafficking in slaves to be “an economy of trade according to “rational” sets of prices, and not as a pure extraction of theft of Africans from Africa by Europeans.” Indeed, the victims of chattel slavery became commodities, given a “rational” price tag. At the time the Dictionnaire universel was written the cost of a slave in a French colony was £19. While this is a somewhat arbitrary number, from an economic standpoint, this is an example of trade in the sense that goods of “similar” value were exchanged. However, the Europeans purchasing slaves directly from Africa bought them for about half the price of slaves in the "New World" with the thought that slaves in Africa did not have environmental factors or technology to be as efficient as slaves in the colonies. Examples of slave prices in Africa include 172 cowries, 1/25 of a horse, and 9000 pounds of sugar. The relativity of the price of a slave contributed to the centripetal force of triangular trade. It drew profits for merchants who bought the same slaves in Africa from Africans for a low cost and then upticked the price for Europeans in the American colonies. While the exchange itself might be considered trade, the power of Europeans to monopolize the trading and trafficking in slaves and control the market poses a strong confounder to the situation, pointing the trans-Atlantic trafficking of slaves from Africa to also be an economy of traite.

== General overview ==
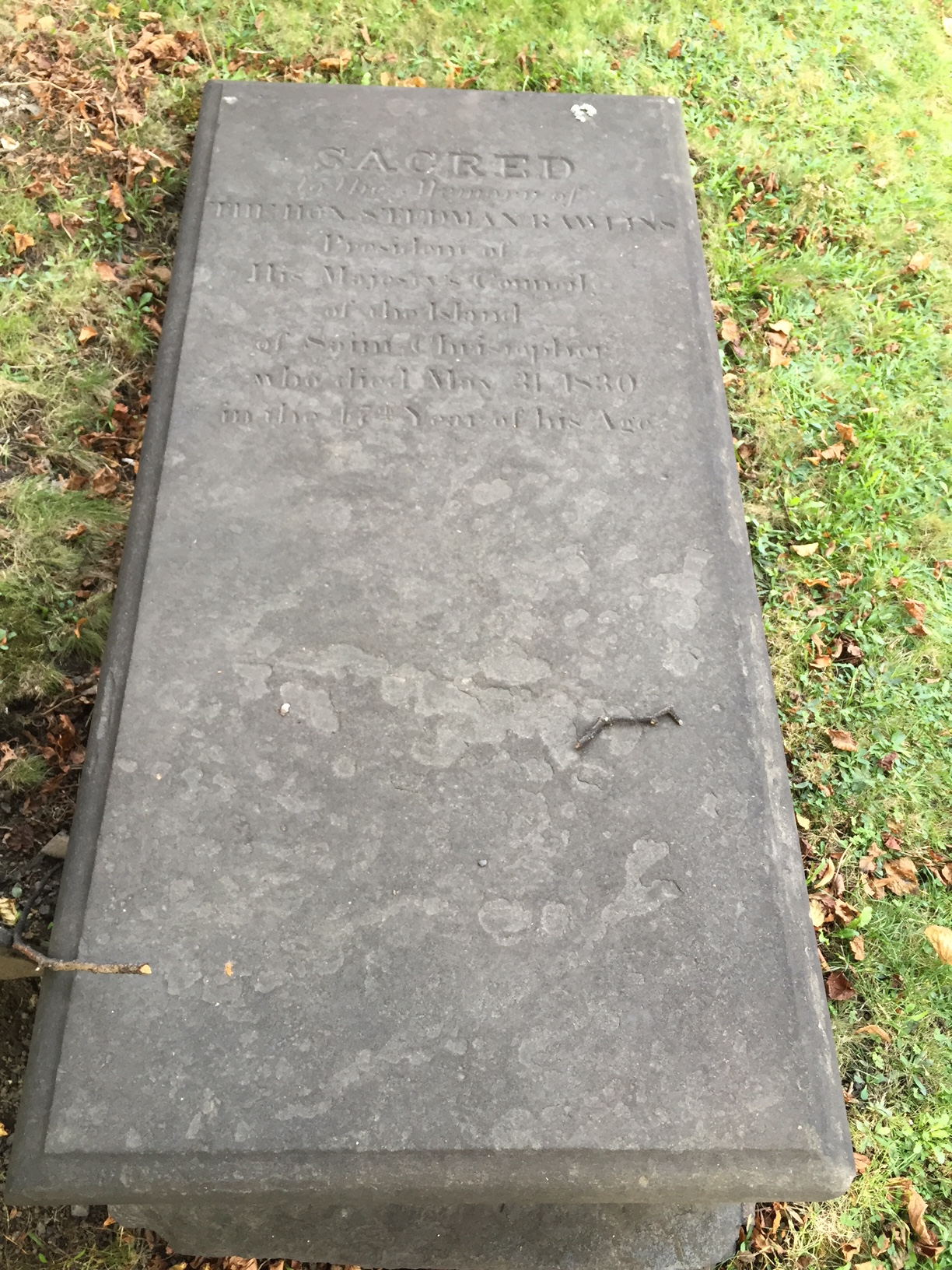
Hon Stedman Rawlins, slave/plantation owner, Saint Kitts, Old Burying Ground (Halifax, Nova Scotia)

The Lesser Antilles islands of Barbados, St. Kitts, Saint Vincent and the Grenadines, Antigua, Martinique, Guadeloupe, Saint Lucia and Dominica were the first important slave societies of the Caribbean, switching to the institution of slavery by the end of the 17th century as their economies converted from tobacco to sugar production, and as mercantilism became the dominant economic system in Europe. The mercantilism model limited imports and highly valued exports, which largely drove imperial efforts across Europe by utilizing slave labor in order to produce cheap goods to be sold at higher market prices upon their return to Europe. By the middle of the 18th century, British Jamaica and French Saint-Domingue (now Haiti) had become the largest slave societies of the region, rivaling Brazil as a destination for enslaved Africans.

The death rates for Black slaves in these islands were higher than birth rates. The decrease averaged about 3 percent per year in Jamaica and 4 percent a year in the smaller islands. The diary of slaveowner Thomas Thistlewood of Jamaica details violence against enslaved people, and constitutes important historical documentation of the conditions for enslaved people from the Caribbean.

For centuries the institution of slavery made sugarcane production economical. The low level of technology made production difficult and labor-intensive. At the same time, the demand for sugar was rising, particularly in Great Britain. The French colony of Saint-Domingue quickly began to out-produce all of the British islands combined. Though sugar was driven by slavery, rising costs for the British made it easier for the British abolitionists to be heard. Sugar thus became inherently linked to the institution of slavery, and the link was publicized specifically in abolition and anti-sugar movements, but was understood by many French citizens. Voltaire, for example, wrote of a sighting of a maimed slave in Candide, writing: "C'est à ce prix que vous mangez du sucre en Europe" ("this is what it costs for you to eat your sugar in Europe").

In addition to sugar, France additionally capitalized on "pacotille," or cheap goods such as rum, tobacco, coffee and indigo. These cheap products were brought from Europe and traded to African elites in exchange for enslaved people. Profiting from "pacotille" was another method of perpetuating the mercantilism economic model.

== Anglo-American institution of slavery ==
The system of African slavery that developed in the Lesser Antilles was an outgrowth of the demand for sugar and other crops. As part of Oliver Cromwell's Western Design, the English captured several Spanish colonial possessions in the West Indies, most prominently Jamaica, which was invaded and occupied in 1655. Colonists soon transformed Jamaica into a center of the Atlantic slave trade.

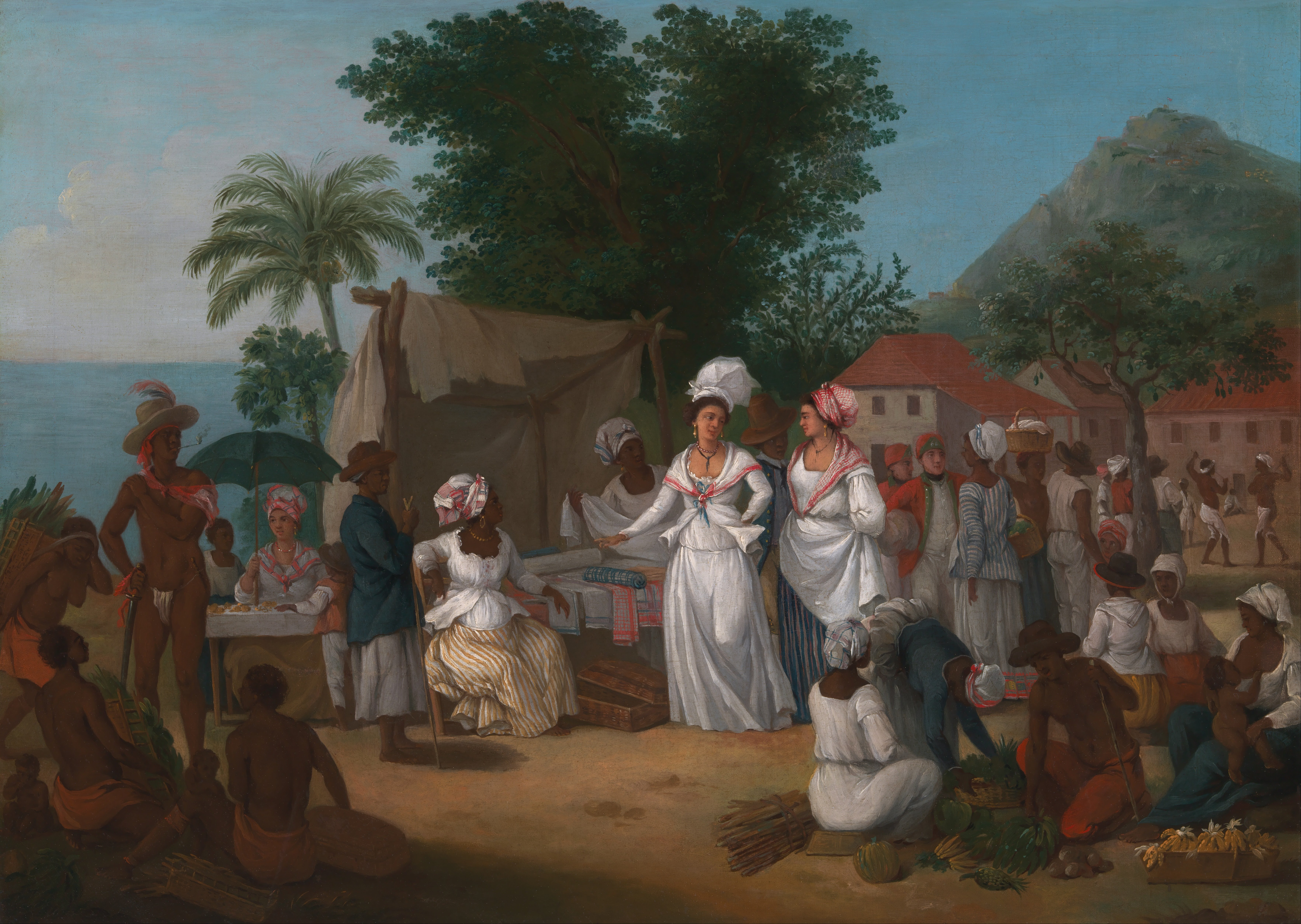
A Linen Market with enslaved Africans. British West Indies, c. 1780

In 1640 the English began sugar production with the help of the Dutch. This started the Anglo-American plantation societies which would later be led by Jamaica after it was fully developed. At its peak production between 1740 and 1807 Jamaica received 33% of the total slaves who were trafficked in order to keep up its production. Other crops besides sugar were also cultivated on the plantations. Tobacco, coffee, and livestock were all produced as well using slave labor. Sugar, however, stands out most prominently due to its exorbitant popularity during the time period and the dangers of its production, which claimed the lives of many slaves.

England had multiple sugar colonies in the Caribbean, especially Jamaica, Barbados, Nevis, and Antigua, which provided a steady flow of sugar to Europe and North America; indentured and slave labor produced the sugar. English involvement in slavery increased as a result of the Treaty of Utrecht, which was signed in 1713. During the negotiations of the treaty, of special importance was the successful secret negotiation with France to obtain a 30-year monopoly on selling African slaves in the Spanish Empire, known as the Asiento de Negros. Queen Anne of Great Britain also allowed her North American colonies like Virginia to make laws that promoted the institution of slavery. Anne had secretly negotiated with the French government to get its approval regarding the asiento, since it had previously been awarded to France to the benefit of French merchants. The British government gave the asiento to the newly-formed South Sea Company. Most of the trafficking of slaves by the South Sea Company involved sales to Spanish colonies in the Caribbean, and to Mexico, as well as sales to British colonies in the Caribbean and in North America. Historian Vinita Ricks says the agreement allotted Queen Anne "22.5% (and King Philip V, of Spain 28%) of all profits [from the asiento] collected for her personal fortune." Ricks concludes that the Queen's "connection to slave trade revenue meant that she was no longer a neutral observer. She had a vested interest in what happened on slave ships."

Slaves incoming to the Anglo-American colonies were at high risk both mentally and physically. The Middle Passage alone accounted for roughly 10% of all deaths of trafficked African people. Some experts believe that one out of every three slaves died before ever reaching their African port of departure. The majority of slaves in English and later British colonies originated from Western Central Africa. The conditions suffered by slaves during the voyages were extraordinarily harsh. Slaves were placed in close quarters, fed barely enough to keep them alive, and oftentimes they fell victim to diseases contracted prior to the voyage. The slaves would not see sunlight during this period. They were prone to both weight loss and scurvy.

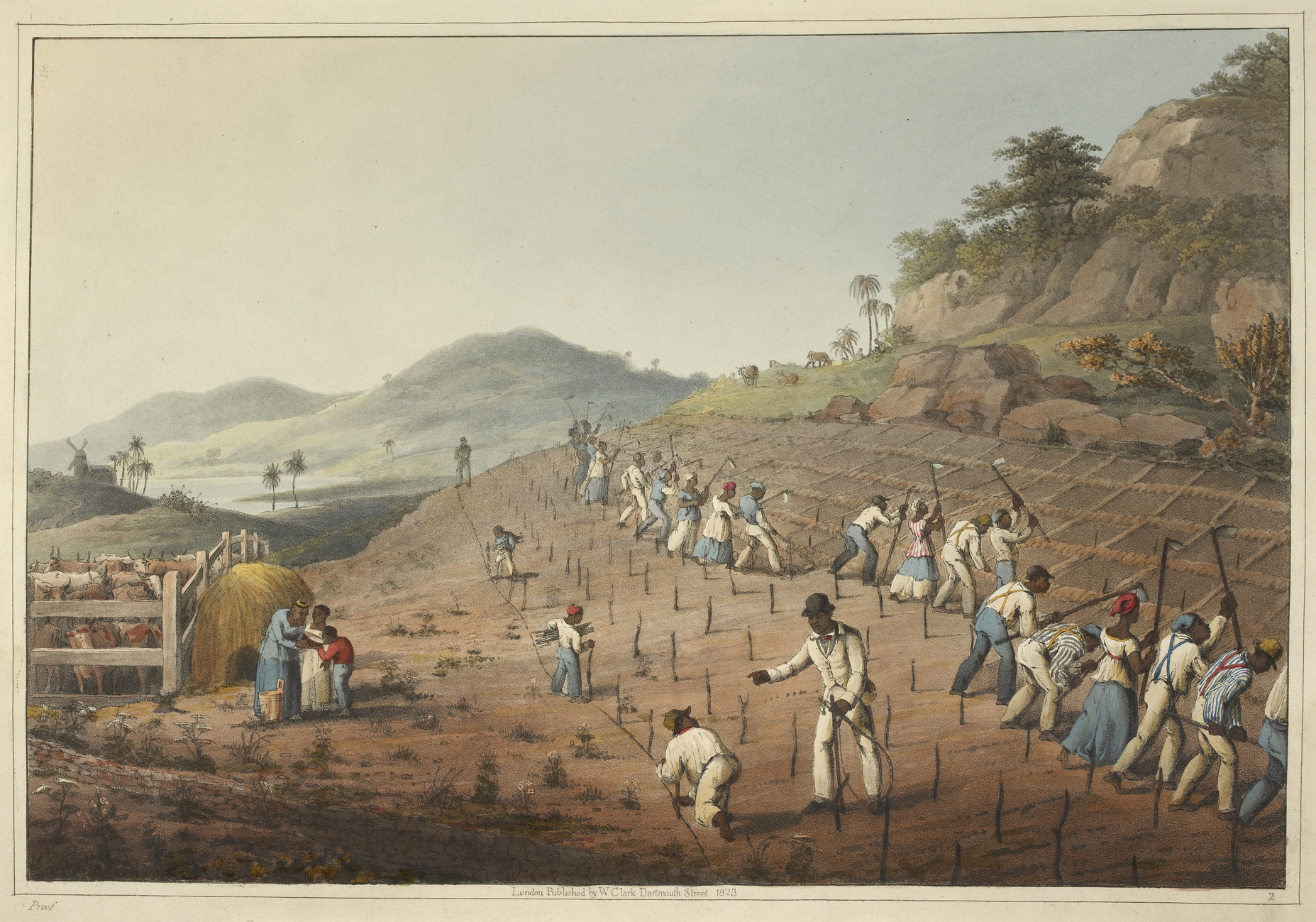
Slaves in the British colony of Antigua, 1823

The living and working conditions in the Lesser Antilles were excruciating for the slaved who were brought in to work the sugar plantations. The average lifespan of a slave after "adjusting" to the climate and environmental conditions of Jamaica was expected to be less than two decades. This was due to their limited familiarity and immune defense against the diseases and illnesses present in Jamaica. Disease decimated incoming slave populations. Attempts were made to help curtail the problem, but ultimately were fruitless.

To help protect their investments, most slave owners would not immediately give the hardest tasks to the newest slaves. Slave owners would also set up a walled area away from the veteran slaves in order to stymie the spread of disease. These areas would contain 100–200 slaves at any time. Later, after new slaves had been purchased, they would be placed into the care of older and more experienced slaves who were already accustomed to the plantations in hopes of increasing their chances for survival. Examples of tasks assigned to new slaves include planting and constructing buildings.

Sugar production in the Lesser Antilles was a very grisly business. On Jamaica from 1829 to 1832 the average mortality rate for slaves on sugar plantations was 35.1 deaths per 1000 enslaved people. The most dangerous part of the sugar plantation was the cane planting. Cane planting during this era consisted of clearing land, digging the holes for the plants, and more. Overseers used the whip in an attempt to both motivate and punish slaves. The slaves themselves were also working and living with barely adequate nourishment and in times of hard work would often be starved. This contributed to low birth rates and the extremely high mortality rates for the slaves. Some experts believe that the average infant mortality at plantations to be 50% or even higher. This extremely high rate of infant mortality meant that the slave population that existed in the Lesser Antilles was not self-sustaining, thus requiring a constant importation of new slaves. Living and working conditions on non-sugar plantations was considered to be better, however, only marginally.

== Abolition ==
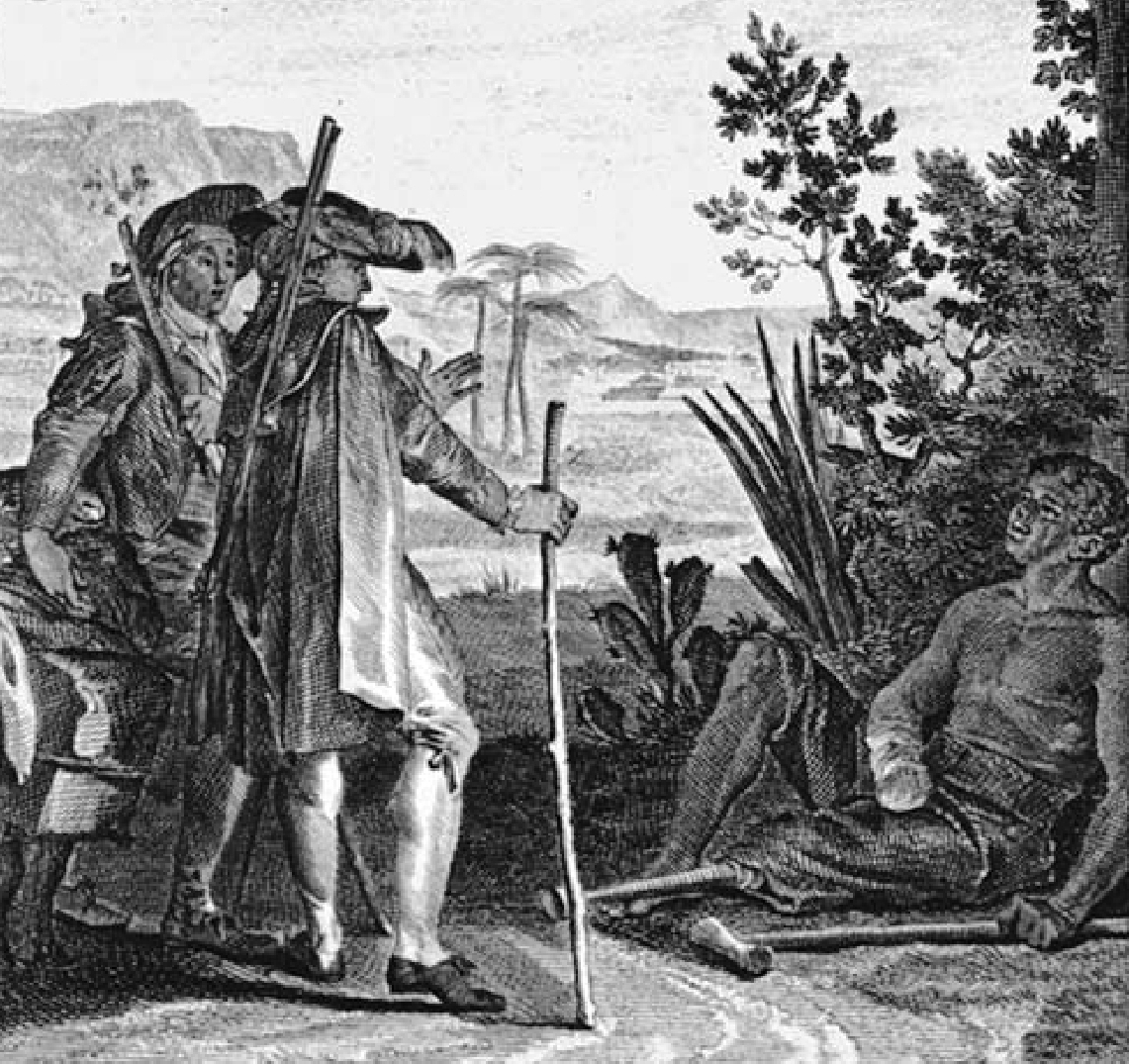
This scene depicts Voltaire's Candide and Cacambo meeting a maimed slave near Suriname. The caption says, "It is at this price that you eat sugar in Europe". The slave who utters the remark has had his hand cut off for getting a finger stuck in a millstone, and his leg cut off for trying to run away.

In 1787, Thomas Clarkson, Granville Sharp, and other abolitionists founded the Society for the Abolition of the Slave Trade, considering the termination of the transatlantic slave trade a necessary precursor to the complete abolition of slavery. The society employed various methods to advance its cause, including the dissemination of firsthand accounts from formerly enslaved individuals such as Olaudah Equiano, the promotion of consumer boycotts against goods produced by enslaved labor, and the organization of petitions directed at the British Parliament.

The institution of Black slavery was first abolished by the French Republic in 1794, but Napoleon revoked that decree in 1802. On 29 March 1815, Napoleon abolished the slave trade but the decree did not come into effect until 1826. France re-abolished the institution of slavery in its colonies in 1848 with a general and unconditional emancipation. Haiti became the first country to abolish slavery following the colony of Saint Domingue's independence from France on 1 January 1804 after the Haitian Revolution had ended by the Declaration of Independence where Haiti became the world's first and oldest free black-led republic in the modern era which was the only black nation to free itself from French rule.

William Wilberforce's Slave Trade Act 1807 abolished the trafficking of slaves in the British Empire. It was not until the Slavery Abolition Act 1833 that the institution was finally abolished, but on a gradual basis. Since slave owners in the various colonies (not only the Caribbean) were losing their unpaid labourers, the government set aside £20 million for compensation but it did not offer the former slaves any reparations.

The colony of Trinidad was left with a shortage of labour. This shortage became worse after the abolition of the institution of slavery in 1833. To deal with this, plantation owners on Trinidad transported indentured servants from the 1810s until 1917. Initially Chinese people, free West African people, and Portuguese people from the island of Madeira were imported, but they were soon supplanted by Indian people who started arriving from 1845. Indentured Indians would prove to be an adequate alternative for the plantations that formerly relied upon slave labour. In addition, numerous former slaves migrated from the Lesser Antilles to Trinidad to work.

In 1811 on the island of Tortola in the British Virgin Islands, Arthur William Hodge, a wealthy slaveholder, plantation owner and Council member, became the first person to be hanged for the murder of an enslaved person.

In 1833, the British Parliament passed the Slavery Abolition Act, permanently abolishing the instutiton of slavery in Britain's overseas colonies. The Act also stipulated that all formerly enslaved people would undergo a system of apprenticeship whereby they would work for their former owners for a period of time; how long this would last would be up to the government authorities in each British colony. On 1 August 1834 in Trinidad, an unarmed group of mainly elderly Black people being addressed by the Governor at Government House about the new apprenticeship laws, began chanting: "Pas de six ans. Point de six ans" ("Not six years. No six years"), drowning out the voice of the Governor. Peaceful protests continued until a resolution to abolish "apprenticeship" was passed and de facto freedom was achieved. This made Trinidad the first British colony with a slave population to completely abolish the institution of slavery. The successful resistance of the implementation of the full six-year term of the Apprenticeship system and Abolition of Slavery in Trinidad was marked by ex-slaves and free people of colour joining in celebrations through the streets in what became known as their annual Canboulay celebrations. This event in Trinidad influenced full emancipation in the other British colonies which was legally granted two years ahead of schedule on 1 August 1838.

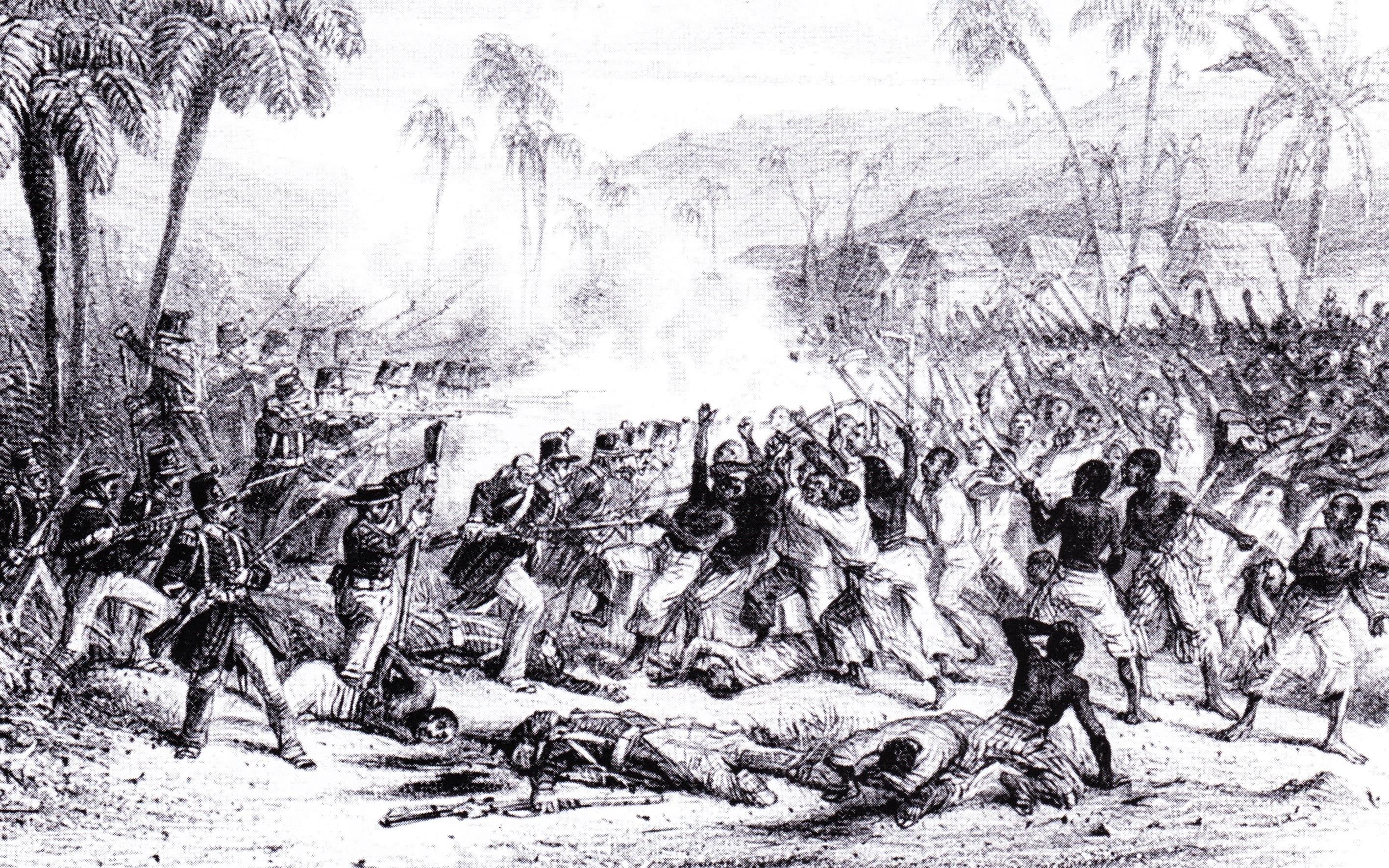
Slave revolt in Martinique in May 1848 forced the local administration to abolish slavery before the scheduled date.

After Great Britain abolished the institution of slavery, it began to pressure other nations to do the same. France abolished the institution of slavery in 1848, in its colonies of Guadeloupe, Martinique, French Guiana and Réunion.

== See also ==
- Amelioration Act 1798
- Barbados Cricket Buckle
- Barbados Slave Code
- Biography and the Black Atlantic
- Centre for the Study of the Legacies of British Slavery
- Code Noir
- Demerara rebellion of 1823
- Indian slave trade between Barbados and South Carolina
- Antoine Lavalette, Jesuit priest, slave holder, and currency speculator
- Natural person in French law
- Slavery in Haiti
- Slavery in the British Virgin Islands
- Sugar plantations in the Caribbean
- Bussa's rebellion
- Berbice Rebellion
- 1733 slave insurrection on St. John
- Prince Klaas
- Denmark Vesey

== Bibliography ==
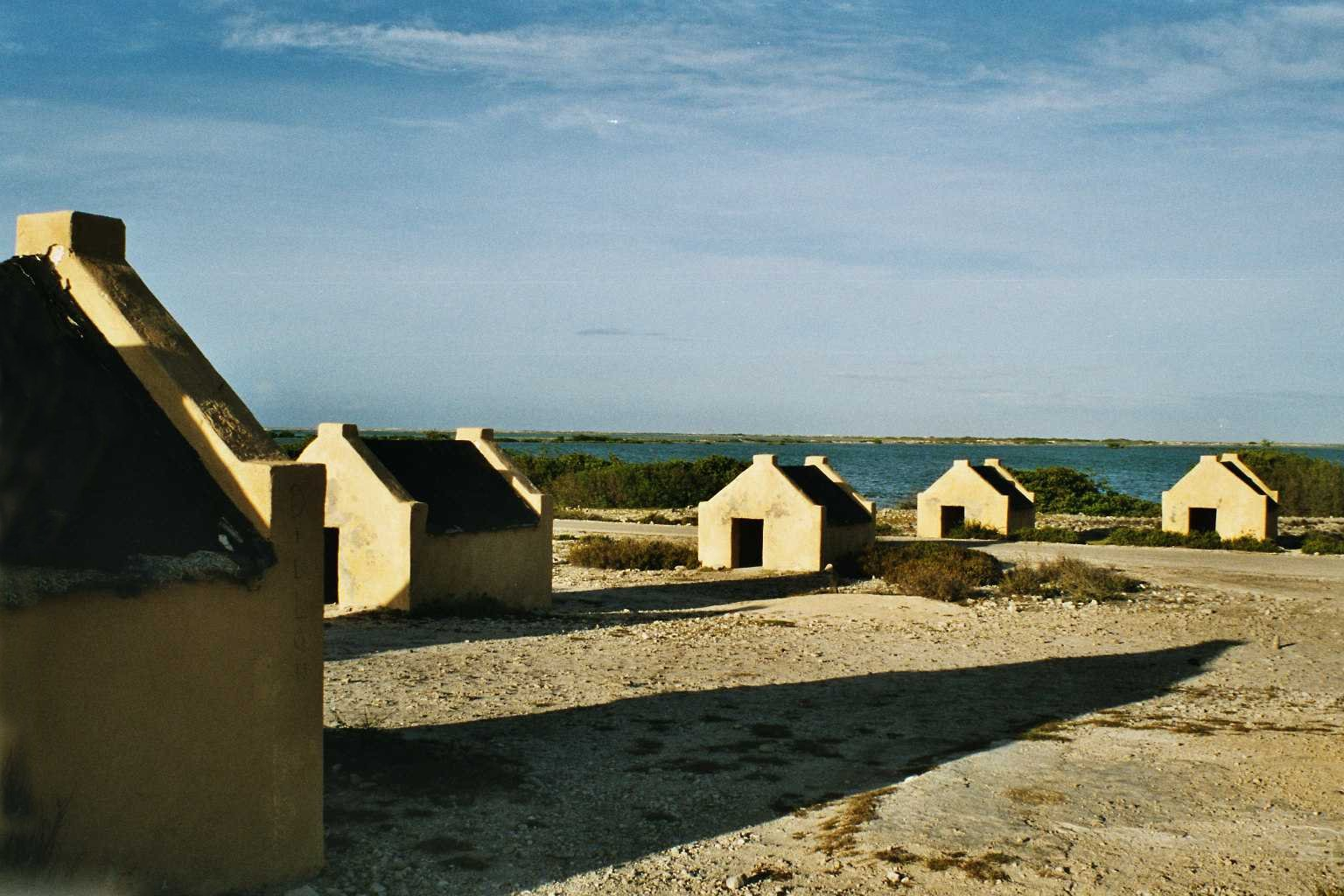
Slave huts in Bonaire at the Salt evaporation pond)

- Beckles, Hilary McD., and Andrew Downes. "The Economics of Transition to the Black Labor System in Barbados, 1630–1680," Journal of Interdisciplinary History, Vol. 18, No. 2 (Autumn 1987), pp. 225–247 in JSTOR
- Brown, Vincent. "The Reaper's Garden" (Harvard University Press, 2008)
- Bush, Barbara. "Hard Labor: Women, Childbirth, and Resistance in British Caribbean Slave Societies", in David Barry Gaspar and Darlene Clarke Hine, eds, More Than Chattel: Black Women and Slavery in the Americas (Bloomington: Indiana University Press, 1996), pp. 193–217.
- Bush, Barbara. Slave Women in Caribbean society, 1650–1838 (Bloomington: Indiana University Press, 1990).
- Butler, Kathleen Mary (1995). The Economics of Emancipation: Jamaica & Barbados, 1823–1843. Archived from the original on 6 September 2012 – via Questia.
- Dunn, Richard S., "The Barbados Census of 1680: Profile of the Richest Colony in English America," William and Mary Quarterly, vol. 26, no. 1 (January 1969), pp. 3–30. in JSTOR
- Giraldo, Alexander. Obeah: The Ultimate Resistance (2007)
- Miller, Joseph C., "The Way of Death: West Central Africa," (The University of Wisconsin Press, 1988)
- Molen, Patricia A. "Population and Social Patterns in Barbados in the Early Eighteenth Century," William and Mary Quarterly, Vol. 28, No. 2 (April 1971), pp. 287–300 in JSTOR
- Morrissey, Marietta. Slave women in the New World (Kansas: University Press of Kansas, 1989).
- Ragatz, Lowell Joseph. "Absentee Landlordism in the British Caribbean, 1750–1833," Agricultural History, Vol. 5, No. 1 (January 1931), pp. 7–24 in JSTOR
- Reddock, Rhoda E. "Women and Slavery in the Caribbean: A Feminist Perspective", Latin American Perspectives, 12:1 (Winter 1985), 63–80.
- Sainvil, Talisha. Tradition and Women in Resistance (2007) Monday, 26 November 2007.
- Sheridan, Richard B. (1994). Sugar and Slavery: An Economic History of the British West Indies, 1623–1775. University of the West Indies Press. Archived from the original on 19 October 2012 – via Questia.
- Smallwood, Stephanie. "Saltwater Slavery" (First Harvard University Press, 2008)
- Thomas, Robert Paul. "The Sugar Colonies of the Old Empire: Profit or Loss for Great Britain?" Economic History Review Vol. 21, No. 1 (April 1968), pp. 30–45 in JSTOR
- Couti, Jacqueline. "Dangerous Créole Liaisons, Sexuality and Nationalism in French Caribbean Discourses from 1806 to 1897" (Liverpool University Press, 2016)
