= Vishal Bharat =

British Virgin Islands cricketer

Personal information
- Full name: Vishal Bharat
- Born: 20 November 1978 (age 47)
- Batting: Right-handed
- Bowling: Right-arm off break

Domestic team information
- Years: Team
- 2006–2007/08: British Virgin Islands

Career statistics
| Competition | Twenty20 |
|---|---|
| Matches | 2 |
| Runs scored | 12 |
| Batting average | 6.00 |
| 100s/50s | –/– |
| Top score | 12 |
| Balls bowled | 36 |
| Wickets | 1 |
| Bowling average | 35.00 |
| 5 wickets in innings | – |
| 10 wickets in match | – |
| Best bowling | 1/25 |
| Catches/stumpings | –/– |
- Source: Cricinfo, 13 January 2013

Vishal Bharat (born 20 November 1978) is a British Virgin Islands cricketer. Bharat is a right-handed batsman who bowls right-arm off break.

In 2006, the British Virgin Islands were invited to take part in the 2006 Stanford 20/20, whose matches held official Twenty20 status. Bharat made a single appearance in the tournament against Saint Lucia in a preliminary round defeat, with him scoring 12 runs before he was dismissed by Garey Mathurin, while with the ball he bowled two wicketless overs which conceded 10 runs. He later played for the team in its second appearance in the Stanford 20/20 in 2008, making a single appearance in a preliminary round defeat against Dominica, where he was dismissed for a duck by Liam Sebastien, while with the ball he took the wicket of Fernix Thomas in Dominica's innings to finish with figures of 1/25 from four overs. He also captained the team in this match.
