= John Lyons Nixon =

John Lyons Nixon was the Lieutenant Governor of Saint Christopher between 1833 and 1836.

John Lyons Nixon worked in the future British Guiana in 1826, held the post of general receiver. Several years later, in 1833–6, he was appointed Lieutenant Governor of St Kitts. He traveled to England, where he obtained compensation for five slaves in his own name in the aforementioned Guiana, with his wife Anna Munro Nixon, who also counterclaimed, subsequently reaching a deal to get a portion of the compensation for the property of the Foulis state in British Guiana. Apparently he died in Clifton.

The second wife of John Lyons Nixon, Anna Munro (née Barrett [e]) was the pupil of William Munro of Berbice, the owner of Foulis.
