= Baron Golosh =

Baron Golosh is an operetta adapted from the 1891 French opérette L'oncle Célestin by Edmond Audran with some of the original music replaced with songs composed by Meyer Lutz and Leslie Stuart.

After a tryout in Swansea, it premiered from 25 April to 8 June 1895 at the Trafalgar Theatre in London, running for only 43 performances. The original cast starred comedian E. J. Lonnen in the title role. It also featured Scott Russell, Florence Perry and Frank Wyatt, who were all best known for their work with the D'Oyly Carte Opera Company. The cast also included Sylvia Grey, making her last appearance in a West End Theatre.
