= Milton Allen =

Governor of Saint Christopher-Nevis-Anguilla (1888–1981)

His Excellency Sir Milton Allen OBE

Governor of Saint Christopher-Nevis-Anguilla
- In office 1969–1975
- Monarch: Elizabeth II
- Premier: Robert Bradshaw
- Preceded by: Sir Fred Phillips
- Succeeded by: Sir Probyn Inniss

Personal details
- Born: 22 June 1888 Trinity, Saint Kitts
- Died: 17 September 1981 (aged 93) Basseterre, Saint Kitts
- Spouse: Annie Locker-Allen

Sir Milton Pentonville Allen OBE (22 June 1888 – 17 September 1981) was the Governor of Saint Christopher-Nevis-Anguilla from 1969 to 1975. He was a native of Saint Kitts, and was a journalist and politician before being appointed governor.

== Early life ==
Allen was born in Palmetto Point, Saint Kitts. The son of a stonemason, he served an apprenticeship to a tailor in Basseterre before deciding to emigrate to the United States. Settling in New York City, he became a leader of the West Indian community there, and organised financial support for the newly formed Saint Kitts Workers' League (a forerunner of the current Labour Party). After more than 25 years as a resident of the United States, Allen returned to Saint Kitts in 1935, becoming known as an editor of various labour movement publications.

== Politics ==
Allen was appointed to the Legislative Council of Saint Christopher-Nevis-Anguilla in 1958, but resigned in 1962 to allow Robert Bradshaw, a minister in the West Indies Federation, to resume his position after the federation's dissolution. He returned to the council shortly after, and served for a period as a minister without portfolio before eventually being elected speaker. He was appointed an Officer of the Order of the British Empire (OBE) in June 1964, for his parliamentary service.

== Governorship and later life ==
In 1969, following the resignation of Sir Fred Phillips, Allen was appointed acting governor of the Islands. He was made a Knight Bachelor in the 1972 New Year Honours, and later in the year received a permanent appointment as governor, becoming the first native of Saint Kitts to serve in the position. Allen continued to serve as governor until early 1975, when he retired and was replaced by Probyn Inniss. He died in September 1981, aged 93.

Government offices
Preceded by Sir Fred Phillips	Governor of Saint Christopher-Nevis-Anguilla; 1969–1975	Succeeded by Sir Probyn Inniss
