= Henry Howard (colonial governor) =

British soldier, journalist and colonial administrator

Lt.-Col. Hon. Henry Anthony Camillo Howard (3 March 1913 – 19 October 1977) was a British journalist, military officer, and colonial administrator in the Caribbean. He was a member of the aristocratic Howard family.

== Early life and family ==
Howard was born in Bern, Switzerland, the fifth son of diplomat Esmé Howard, 1st Baron Howard of Penrith of Greystoke Castle, and Lady Isabella Giovanna Teresa Gioachina Giustiniani-Bandini. He was a member of the Greystolk Howards, a Protestant branch of the Howard family, prominent Roman Catholic aristocrats headed by the Duke of Norfolk, the premiere duke in the Peerage of England. His father, however, converted to Catholicism in 1898. His grandfather Henry Howard (1802–1875), who rebuilt Greystoke, was the son of Lord Henry Howard-Molyneux-Howard and nephew of the Duke of Norfolk. His mother, Lady Isabella, was Italian of Scottish descent, the daughter of Sigismundo Giustiniani-Bandini, 8th Earl of Newburgh.

Despite his noble lineage, his father's financial problems left Howard of limited means and worked throughout his life, despite ongoing struggles with his health.

Howard was educated at the Royal Military College, Sandhurst, where he was awarded the Sword of Honour. He was fluent in Italian, his mother's native tongue.

== Career ==
Howard became a journalist for the Financial Times and The Economist in the 1930s, then during the Second World War returned to the British Army as an officer, serving in the Somaliland Camel Corps in British Somaliland. He left the corps after being wounded in Syria and nearly dying from a serious illness, but was posted to the Military Mission to the Italian Army, training the Italians to fight alongside the Allies.

After the war he joined the Colonial Office and was Governor of the British Virgin Islands from 1954 to 1956, then Administrator of Saint Kitts-Nevis-Anguilla from 1956 to 1966.

He retired in Anguilla, where he wrote for the local media and for English and American magazines. He also regularly broadcast on international politics on Saint Thomas radio.

== Marriage and issue ==
Howard married on 11 September 1937 Adèle Le Bourgeois Alsop, daughter of Reece Denny Alsop, of New York, and Julia Sanford Chapin Alsop (later Mrs. Basil de Selincourt), of Far End, Kingham, Oxfordshire.

They had five daughters:

- Mary Rosalind Howard (born 6 August 1938), married Ian Harlowe Lowe
- Susan Isabella Howard (4 June 1940 – 10 October 1963)
- Joan Dacre Howard (born 30 June 1946), married firstly in 1966 William J. Lacey (divorced 1979) and secondly in 1980 Gordon Waugh Richards
- Adèle Cristina Sophia Howard (born 18 November 1952), married in 1984 Hon. Timothy Palmer, son of Maj. Hon. Robert Jocelyn Palmer (son of 3rd Earl of Selborne) and Anne Palmer, 11th Baroness Lucas and 7th Lady Dingwall
- Charlotte Fell Howard (born 15 December 1953), married 1985 Ian Mintrim (later divorced)

Howard became separated from his wife when he would not move back to England. Because he was Roman Catholic he chose not to seek a divorce, but he began a relationship with a European woman from Saint Kitts who had her name changed to Howard by deed poll.

He died on 19 October 1977.

His widow died in her sleep on 15 February 2011 at Bushby House, Greystoke, Cumbria, aged 96.

== See also ==
- List of colonial heads of the British Virgin Islands
