= Alleyn Prospere =

Saint Lucian cricketer (born 1979)

Personal information
- Full name: Alleyn Prospere
- Born: 10 October 1979 (age 47); Saint Lucia
- Batting: Right-handed
- Bowling: Right-arm offbreak
- Role: Bowler

Domestic team information
- Years: Team
- 2006-2008: Saint Lucia
- Source: CricketArchive, 11 May 2016

Alleyn Prospere (birth 10 October 1979 in St Lucia) is a former Saint Lucian cricketer who played for the Saint Lucia national cricket team in Stanford 20/20 in West Indian domestic cricket. He played as a right-handed batsman as well as right-arm offbreak bowler.
