= Thomas Risely Griffith =

19th-century British colonial official

Thomas Risely Griffith (1848 – 9 September 1920) was a British colonial official who served in Africa and the West Indies from 1874 to 1899 until he was removed on accusations of immoral behaviour.

== Early life ==
Griffith was born in Peterborough, Ontario, Canada, the son of Daniel Griffith of the Royal Navy and Frances "Fanny" Shelton Griffith. He had elder brothers, Henry A., Charles B., and William and a sister, Fanny.

== Colonial service ==
In 1874, he was appointed Auditor of Grenada. In 1879, Griffith was appointed Colonial Secretary and Treasurer of British Sierra Leone.

He served in the Gambia, where he was Acting Administrator of the Gambia from 27 November 1887 to 6 June 1888. He was appointed as the first Administrator of the Seychelles in February 1889, and served until 1895. During his first six months, Griffith realised that religion was a key social factor for the 16,000 inhabitants of the island, especially in relation to education. His main concern was the creation of a non-denominational school, in which the language of instruction would be English. However, as Griffith was a Protestant, it was impossible to convince the Catholic church that he was not biased. In 1890, Griffith wrote to Sir Daniel Morris to suggest that an experienced botanist come to the Seychelles to run an experimental botanical garden, if finances allowed it.

In the 1892 New Year Honours, he was appointed a Companion of the Order of St Michael and St George (CMG).

In 1898, he was appointed Administrator of the Presidency of Saint Kitts and Nevis and Treasurer of the Presidency.

== Scandals and resignation of honour ==
In 1874, in Barbados, he married Mary Jane Helen Griffith, daughter of William Brandford Griffith governor of Gold Coast Colony 1885–1895, and sister of judge Sir William Brandford Griffith. For many years, his wife and their four surviving children (Gordon Risely, May Metcalf, Arthur Cecil, and Edward Stanhope) remained in England while he served in the colonial service. In 1888, she sued for legal separation on grounds he refused to provide for his family financially and was involved in multiple adulterous affairs. She was awarded £175 annually (equivalent to £20,000 in 2025) in maintenance.

In late 1898, Griffith was accused in a Saint Kitts court of keeping a mistress at Government House, Basseterre, beating a gardener who upset said mistress, and then attempting to bribe the gardener to not report the assault. Witnesses were heard at the inquiry into the matter, but the case was withdrawn without prejudice after a juror was heard complaining about the accusation. The Colonial Office advanced the matter and was investigated by Sir Henry Wrenfordsley, then Chief Justice of the Leeward Islands. Griffith was removed from his post and was replaced by Francis Spencer Wigley as acting administrator.

In June 1899, Griffith resigned his CMG.

== Death ==
Griffith died in 1920 in Toronto.
