= Reginald St. Johnston =

British colonial administrator, physician, author and British Army officer (1881–1950)

Sir Thomas Reginald St. Johnston
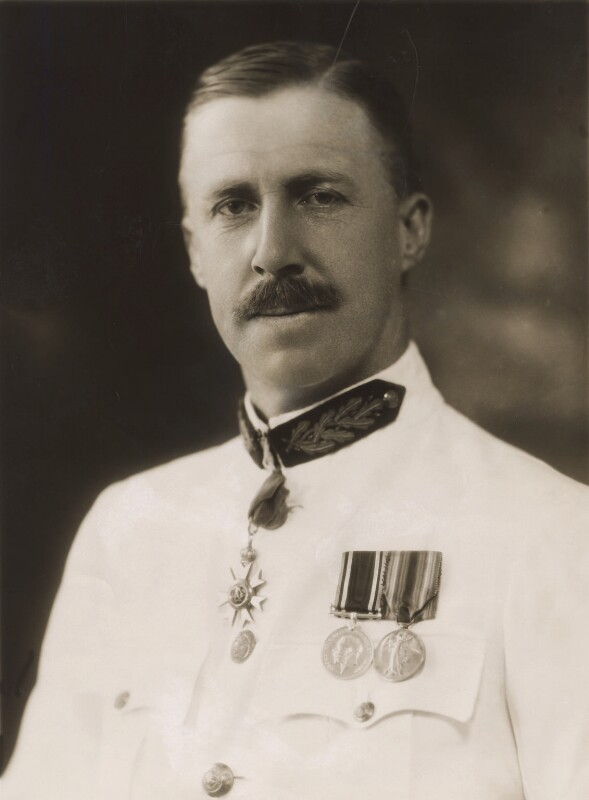
- St. Johnston in 1928
- Born: 8 June 1881
- Died: 29 August 1950 (aged 69); Eastbourne, England, UK
- Other names: Reginald St. Johnston
- Education: Cheltenham College; Elizabeth College, Guernsey; University of Birmingham
- Occupations: British colonial administrator; Physician; Barrister; Author; British Army Officer
- Spouse: Alice Lethbridge (m. 1906; died 1948)

Sir Thomas Reginald St. Johnston KCMG (8 June 1881 – 29 August 1950) was a British colonial administrator, physician, author and British Army officer.

== Early life ==
St. Johnston was the son of Edward Cocks Johnston (1853–1921) and Edith Mary Johnston (née Moore, 1856–1883). He spent the majority of his secondary school years at Cheltenham College, his final year of schooling was spent at Elizabeth College, Guernsey.

He attend the University of Birmingham, before studying law at Middle Temple and medicine at Westminster Hospital. He became a Member of the Royal College of Surgeons and a Licentiate of the Royal College of Physicians.

== Career ==
St. Johnston worked briefly for the Local Government Board in 1906 before joining the Colonial Service the following year.

Between 1907 and 1917, he worked in various administrative roles in Fiji, before being seconded for service in the First World War and attached to the War Office as a Royal Army Medical Corps officer. In 1919, he was posted to the Falkland Islands as colonial secretary. St. Johnston was then colonial secretary in the Leeward Islands from 1920 to 1925, and was posted to Dominica, Antigua and Saint Kitts and Nevis between 1925 and 1929. He was governor of the Leeward Islands from 1929 until his retirement in 1936. He was made a Knight Commander of the Order of St Michael and St George in the 1931 Birthday Honours. During the Second World War he returned to military duties and joined the Ministry of Supply in 1942.

In 1906, he married Alice Lethbridge. St. Johnston was the author of sixteen books.
