= James George Mackenzie =

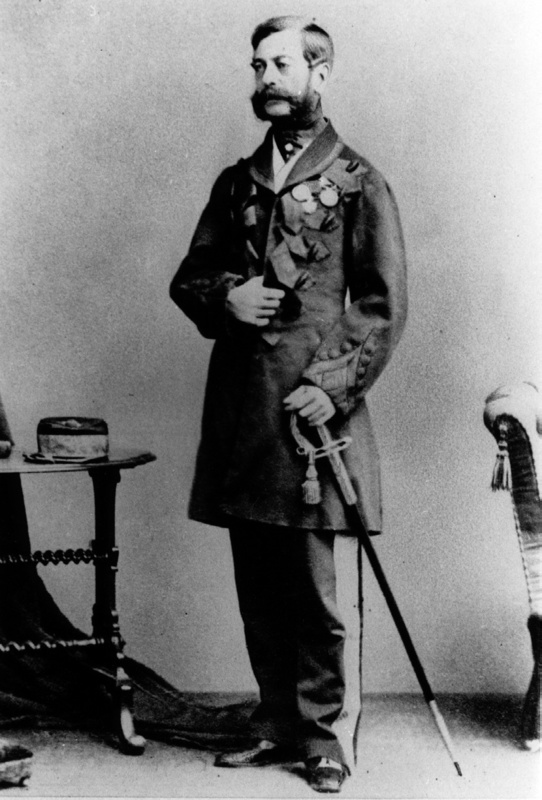

Rear-Admiral James George Mackenzie (1803? – 25 February 1879) was a Royal Navy officer. He served as Governor of the Falkland Islands from 1862 to 1866 and as Lieutenant Governor of Saint Christopher from 1867 to 1869.
