= List of cities and towns in Saint Kitts and Nevis =

This is a list of cities and towns in Saint Kitts and Nevis. For convenience, the list is organized by parishes, which are the administrative units of the Federation of Saint Kitts and Nevis. Note that the majority of these settlements, especially on Nevis, are small and would usually be considered to be villages rather than towns.

== Parishes ==
Name	Population (2011)	Capital	Other villages and towns
Saint Thomas Lowland, Nevis	2,069	Cotton Ground	Westbury; Barnes Ghaut; Jessup; Stuart's
Saint John Figtree, Nevis	3,827	Figtree	Bath; Church Ground; Brown Hill; Brown's Pasture; Pembroke; Bush Hill; St. Peter's Hill; Cole Hill
Saint George Gingerland, Nevis	2,496	Market Shop	Chicken Stone; Taylors Pasture; Zetlands; Hull Ground; Rawlins Village; Crook's Ground; Rices; Buck's Hill; Sheriffs; Holmes Hill; Fenton Hill; Stony Hill; Webb's Ground; Harris; Zion; New River
Saint Paul Charlestown, Nevis	1,847	Charlestown	Craddocks Road
Saint James Windward, Nevis	2,038	Newcastle	Rawlins Pasture; Fountain; Scarborough; Camps; Hick's; Brick Kiln; White Hall; Butlers (Butler's); Barnaby; Mt. Lily; Spring Hill; Eden Browne
Saint George Basseterre, Saint Kitts	12,635	Basseterre	Bird Rock; Frigate Bay; Kit Stoddart
Trinity Palmetto Point, Saint Kitts	1,701	Palmetto Point	Mattingley; Camps; West Farm; Boyds; Conphipps; Challengers; Stone Fort
Saint Thomas Middle Island, Saint Kitts	2,535	Middle Island	Franklands; Old Road Town; Verchilds; Lamberts; Conyers; Godwin's Ghaut; Half Way Tree; New Guinea
Saint Anne Sandy Point, Saint Kitts	2,626	Sandy Point Town	Fig Tree; La Vallée; Sir Gillee's
Saint Paul Capesterre, Saint Kitts	2,432	Saint Paul Capesterre	Cranston; Newton Ground; Belmont Estate
Saint John Capesterre, Saint Kitts	2,962	Dieppe Bay Town and Saddlers	Parson's; Harriss'; Belle View; Tabernacle
Christ Church Nichola Town, Saint Kitts	1,922	Nichola Town	Mansion; Borryeux; Molyneux; Phillips'
Saint Mary Cayon, Saint Kitts	3,435	Cayon	Lodge; Ottley's; Little Italy; Spooner's; Keys
Saint Peter Basseterre, Saint Kitts	4,670	Monkey Hill	New Road; Saint Peter's; Stapleton; Parry's; Ogee's; Morgan Heights; La Fontaine; Conaree

== Cities and towns ==
Name	Population	Feature
Basseterre	15,500	Capital of Saint George Basseterre and of Saint Kitts and Nevis
Cayon	3,000	Capital of Saint Mary Cayon
Charlestown	1,820	Capital of Saint Paul Charlestown and of Nevis
Dieppe Bay Town	450	Capital of Saint John Capesterre and first town ever founded in the Caribbean by France
Gingerland	2,500	Capital of Saint George Gingerland and largest town on Nevis
Newcastle	400	Location of Nevis's airport
Old Road Town	1,600	First town ever founded in the Caribbean by Britain
Sandy Point Town	3,000	Capital of Saint Anne Sandy Point and second largest town in Saint Kitts and Nevis

== Notes and references ==
ORDNANCE SURVEY, GOVERNMENT OF THE UNITED KINGDOM, 1984, Nevis, with part of St. Christopher (Saint Kitts). Series E803 (D.O.S. 343), Sheet NEVIS, Edition 5 O.S.D. 1984. Reprinted in 1995, published by the Government of the United Kingdom (Ordnance Survey) for the Government of Saint Christopher (St. Kitts) and Nevis.
