= Saint Mary Cayon Parish =

Coordinates: 17°21′39″N 62°45′22″W

Saint Mary Cayon
- Parish
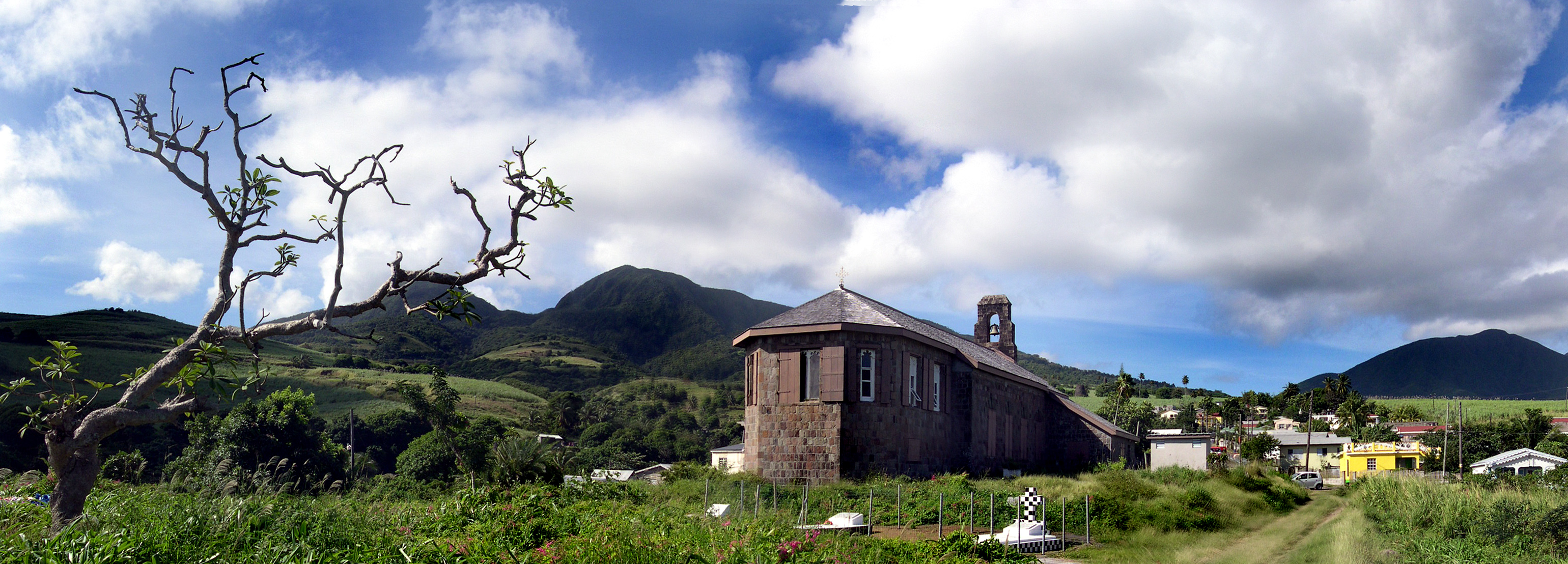
- St. Mary's Church, Cayon

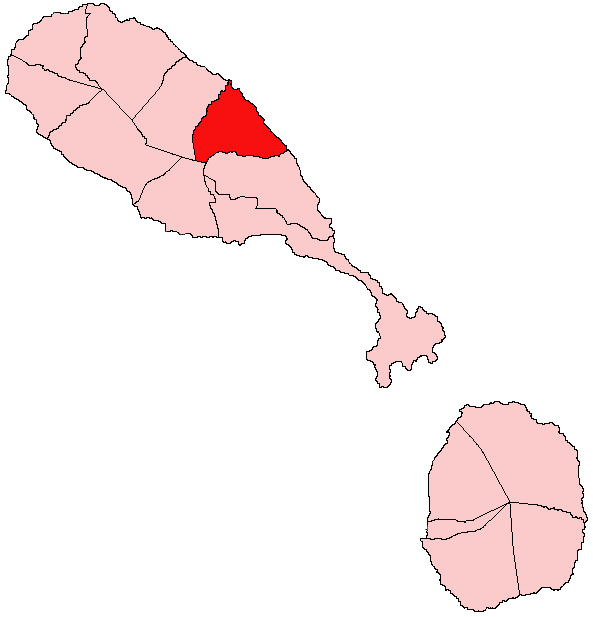
- Country: Saint Kitts and Nevis
- Capital: Cayon

Area
  - Total: 15 km^{2} (5.8 sq mi)

Population (2011)
  - Total: 3,435
  - Density: 229/km^{2} (590/sq mi)

Saint Mary Cayon is one of 14 administrative parishes that make up Saint Kitts and Nevis. It is located on the main island of Saint Kitts and the parish capital is Cayon.

== Land ==
The parish's 6 square miles (16 km^{2}) offer forest-draped mountains in the northern interior, with the more scrub-like covered Canada Hills near the southern interior borders. The coastline is marked by the beautiful (but dangerous due to Atlantic waves) black-sand beach of Hermitage Bay on the North Coast. Sheer cliffs dominate the rest of the coastline, but to the extreme South of this lies a 6-mile (9.7 km) long continuous strip of sand that stretches from Saint Mary Cayon, into Saint Peter Basseterre and eventually into Saint George Basseterre, the sands lightening in hue as one descends southward. The beaches of Saint Mary Cayon are used by Leatherback turtles to lay their eggs. The town of Cayon dominates the central portion of the parish, with the smaller villages of Lodge and Ottley's to the North. All the lands surrounding these villages are covered in peasant farms and abandoned sugar cane estates, up to 1,000 ft (300 m) above sea level, when forests take over.

There are many notable ravines in the parish, indicating that it may be one of the oldest parts of island, after the South East Peninsula. Lodge ghaut is the largest ghaut on St. Kitts and is home to the Lodge Rail bridge, the highest bridge in the federation, nearly 100 feet (30 m) above the ghaut floor. The Cayon river, around which the town of Cayon is situated, is one of only four year-long watered rivers on the island, and the only one on the island's East Coast (the other three being Wingfield River and East River in Saint Thomas Middle Island and Stone Fort River in Trinity Palmetto Point). The water systems around Cayon however, like those on the East Coast, have been tapered off for local consumption. The Southern border of the parish is marked by Key Ghaut, which essentially splits the village of keys over two parishes (St. Mary's and St. Peter's).

== Town/Villages ==
The parish capital is the town of Cayon. Other villages are Key's, Ottley's and Lodge. There are all located near the main road in the parish central zone. The fertile farmlands are also in the zone.

Capital - Cayon

Other Villages:

- Lodge
- Ottley's
- Little Italy
- Spooner's
- Keys

== Economy ==
The Saint Mary Cayon Parish was historically one of the main industrial areas in Saint Kitts, home to the island's cotton ginnery, which was opened in 1901. It made history as its home estate, Spooner's Estate, became the first one in the Caribbean to successfully change from sugar production to cotton. The factory remained open until its acquisition by the government in 1970, shortly after which it was closed down. Since then, no significant industrial development has taken place in the parish, despite Cayon being a sizeable town.

Agriculture dominates today's parish economy. The main crops produced are fruits and ground provisions, with livestock production in the parish being especially high. The second industry of the parish is tourism. A mile inland from Ottley's village lies Ottley's Plantation Inn, a former plantation house and one of the premier hotels on the island. The parish is also noted for its large water stores, which supply much of the East Coast.

== Education ==
- Windsor University School of Medicine

== Community festival ==
There is the famous Green Valley Festival which is celebrated from May to June. The festival is mainly held in Cayon. This festival is one of the many village community festivals held all around St. Kitts, but is largely considered to be one of the best. The festival normally ends with J'ouvert
