= Pakistan women's cricket team in the West Indies in 2010 =

Pakistani women's cricket team in the West Indies in 2010
	Pakistan	West Indies
- Dates: April 26 – April 29
Captains	Sana Mir	Merissa Aguilleira

Twenty20 International series
- Results: West Indies won the 3-match series 2–1
Most runs	Sajjida Shah (78)	Deandra Dottin (54)
Most wickets	Sana Mir (3)	Shanel Daley (6)

The Pakistan national women's cricket team travelled to the West Indies prior to the 2010 ICC Women's World Twenty20 to play three Twenty20 (T20) matches against the West Indies women's cricket team.

== Twenty20 series ==
=== 1st T20 ===
26 April
Scorecard

Pakistan; 84 (19.2 overs)	v	West Indies; 88/6 (19.4 overs)
Sana Mir 18; Shanel Daley 4/6 (4 overs)		Deandra Dottin 28; Sadia Yousuf 3/10 (4 overs)

West Indies women won by 4 wickets
Edgar Gilbert Sports Complex, Molyneaux, Saint Kitts
Umpires: Luther Kelly and Carl Tuckett
Player of the match: Shanel Daley (WI)

- Pakistan won the toss and elected to bat.

=== 2nd T20 ===
27 April
Scorecard

Pakistan; 104/6 (20 overs)	v	West Indies; 105/4 (19.2 overs)
Sana Mir 30 (32); Deandra Dottin 3/13 (3 overs)		Deandra Dottin 36* (28); Sajjida Shah 1/11 (3 overs)

West Indies women won by 6 wickets
Edgar Gilbert Sports Complex, Molyneaux, Saint Kitts
Umpires: Wycliffe Mitchum and Steadroy Techeira
Player of the match: Deandra Dottin (WI)

- Pakistan won the toss and elected to bat.

=== 3rd T20 ===
29 April
Scorecard

West Indies; 105/8 (20 overs)	v	Pakistan; 106/2 (18.5 overs)
Cordel Jack 46 (47); Sana Mir 3/17 (3 overs)		Sajjida Shah 51* (57); Shanel Daley 1/11 (4 overs)

Pakistan women won by 8 wickets
Edgar Gilbert Sports Complex, Molyneaux, Saint Kitts
Umpires: Rudolph Wattley and Vernon Weekes
Player of the match: Not known

- Pakistan won the toss and elected to field.
