= Charles Laplace =

Most recent person executed by Saint Kitts and Nevis

- Died: 19 December 2008; Basseterre
- Conviction: Murder
- Penalty: Execution by hanging

Details
- Victims: 1; his wife, Diane
- Date: 12 February 2004
- Location: Figtree

Charles Elroy Laplace (died 19 December 2008) was the most recent person executed by Saint Kitts and Nevis.

On 28 February 2006, Laplace was convicted of murdering his wife Diane by stabbing her in their home in Figtree on 12 February 2004. On 30 March 2006, Laplace was sentenced to death by hanging.

Laplace was hanged at the prison in Basseterre on 19 December 2008. It was the country's first execution since 2000 and the only execution in the Americas outside the United States since 2003. Laplace's execution was controversial since it was carried out before he was able to appeal his case to the Judicial Committee of the Privy Council in London, which is the supreme court for Saint Kitts and Nevis. Human rights activists and opposition politicians also pointed out that Laplace was not represented by legal counsel at the time of his execution.

== See also ==
- List of most recent executions by jurisdiction
