= Bloody River =

Coordinates: 17°18′11″N 62°47′19″W

Bloody River or Stone Fort River is a river or ghaut (locally called) in Saint Kitts (an island in the Caribbean) which starts from the South East Range, flows west of the village of Challengers and exits at Bloody Point.

Evidence of Indian occupation going back thousands of years is in the form of some petroglyphs. Also, the river and Bloody Point are where some 2,000 Kalinago people were massacred by English and French colonists in 1626.
