= Zion, Saint Kitts and Nevis =

Zion
- Location in Saint Kitts and Nevis
- Coordinates: 17°08′N 062°33′W
- Country: Saint Kitts and Nevis
- Island: Nevis
- Parish: Saint George Gingerland

Zion is a settlement in the southeast of the island of Nevis in Saint Kitts and Nevis. It is located inland from the coast, to the northwest of Market Shop.
