= Pumpa =

Virgin Islands soca artist

Dennis Liburd (born December 10, 1986), better known by his stage name Pumpa, is a Virgin Islands soca artist from St. Kitts.

== Early life ==
Pumpa grew up in the country, in Cayon Village. He attended Cayon Primary School until the third grade. At the age of nine he relocated to St. Croix in the US Virgin Islands, where he then finished his elementary education at the Lew Muckle Elementary School, and then went to Central High School. Liburd says that he got the nickname Pumpa "because of his athletic ability".

== Career ==
During his freshman and early sophomore years, Liburd sang dancehall and opened for a musician known as the "Energy God, Elephant Man". Although he enjoyed singing dancehall and was good at it, in an island community that is built on soca and calypso it was quite difficult to thrive in that genre of music. He crossed over to the soca side of things with a local band called “Rockin Vybez.” While playing with “Rockin Vybez” he realized that soca/calypso would be the arena in which he would flourish.

In the spring of 2003, Liburd, together with Angel “A.J.” Ventura, Alvin Burke, Ana “Nina Nyce” Nelson, Roland “Kurt” Horsford, and Wanston formed the “Xtaushun Band.” Together, they considered their new style to be "the evolution of soca music." They won the gold prize in their first roadmarch championship with the song "Energy", written by Liburd and performed by the band.

Later, Alwyn "Daddy Jones" Baptiste Jr and Liburd collaborated on a soca album entitled "Daddy Jones Presents". "Moko Jumbie", a song that talked about Caribbean stilt dancers, was later released on their "Soca Gold" compilation.

Following the release of the “Daddy Jones Presents”, Liburd graduated from the St. Croix Central High School and then ventured on to the Bryant & Stratton College in Syracuse, New York on a full athletic scholarship. He later transferred to Monroe College in New Rochelle, New York and studied Business Administration. While pursuing his undergraduate degree, he continued to pursue his musical career and released his first solo album “Boom Bam Bye”.

== Discography ==
1. Boom Bam Bye - first album 2008
2. Best Ah Dem - second album 2009 - "offers a beat and tempo for every mood"
3. Driven By Music - third album 2010 - songs "Driven by Music," "Wifey Material," "My Soldiers" and "Drunk."
4. Back To Basics
5. Jeez & Bread - 2016
6. Ayayay - 2018
7. My Crew - 2018
8. Uber Soca Riddim - 2019
9. Show Dem - 2022
10. The A List - 2023
11. Run Me My Money - 2025
