= Mary Charles =

Mary Charles may refer to:

- Mary Carmel Charles (1912–1999), Indigenous Australian author
- Mary Charles George (1913–2008), Kittitian educator
- Mary-Charles Jones (born 2001), American actress
