= Health in Saint Kitts and Nevis =

Life expectancy in Saint Kitts and Nevis at birth was 75.5 years in 2011. It was 72.3 years in 2001.

== Healthcare ==
There are separate ministries of health for the two islands, with parallel organizational structures.

=== Hospitals ===
- Joseph N. France General Hospital - Basseterre,
- Alexandria Hospital - Charlestown, Nevis,
- Pogson Hospital - Sandy Point Town,
- Mary Charles Hospital - Nichola Town

== Public health ==
The Ministry of Health on St. Kitts is responsible for public health surveillance and disease prevention and control programs with a single Chief Medical Officer for the Federation.

== HIV ==
385 HIV cases were reported between 1984 and 2014. There were 149 AIDS cases, and the number of AIDS deaths was 112.
