= Atiba Harris =

Kittitian professional footballer (born 1985)

Atiba Erasto Harris
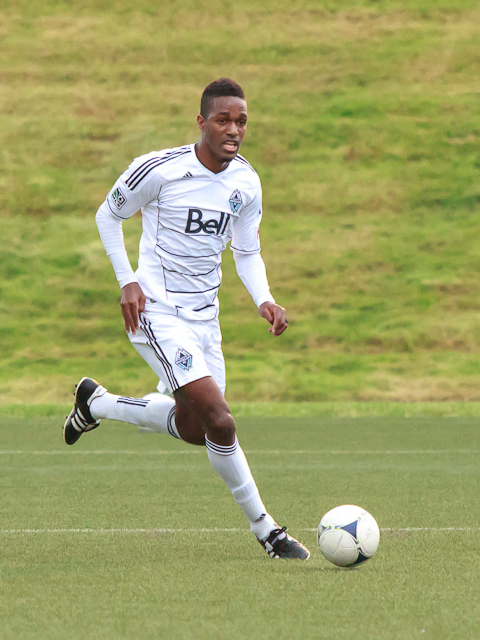
- Harris in 2012

Personal information
- Date of birth: 9 January 1985 (age 41)
- Place of birth: Basseterre, Saint Kitts and Nevis
- Height: 6 ft 3 in (1.91 m)
- Position: Defender

Youth career
- St. Peters FC

Senior career*
Years	Team	Apps	(Gls)
2003–2005	Cádiz	0	(0)
2003–2004	→ Linares (loan)		
2006–2007	Real Salt Lake	43	(4)
2008–2009	Chivas USA	42	(5)
2009–2010	FC Dallas	41	(6)
2011–2012	Vancouver Whitecaps FC	12	(2)
2013	Colorado Rapids	29	(5)
2014	San Jose Earthquakes	24	(4)
2015–2017	FC Dallas	84	(5)
2018	Murciélagos	3	(0)
2018–2021	Oklahoma City Energy	55	(4)

International career^{‡}
2003–2020	Saint Kitts and Nevis	63	(17)
- * Club domestic league appearances and goals as of 6 October 2020 ‡ National team caps and goals as of 15 October 2018

Atiba Erasto Harris (born 9 January 1985) is a Kittitian football administrator and former professional footballer. He captained the Saint Kitts and Nevis national team.

As of August 2021, he serves as President of the St. Kitts and Nevis Football Association.

== Career ==
=== Club ===
Harris played for St. Peters FC as a youngster, captaining them to the SKNFA Premier League Finals, and became the first player from St. Kitts-Nevis to sign with a Spanish club when he signed in Spain with Cádiz in 2003–04.

In 2006, he became the first St. Kitts player to sign with Major League Soccer. He signed with Salt Lake and scored four goals and recorded one assist in 12 starts.

In December 2007, Harris was traded to Chivas USA for a third-round pick in the 2008 SuperDraft. After a season and a half with Chivas USA, the Goats traded Harris in July 2009 to FC Dallas in exchange for Marcelo Saragosa. Harris ended his Chivas USA career with 42 appearances, 5 goals, and 7 assists.

On 12 September 2009, in a match against Los Angeles Galaxy, Harris scored his first goal with FC Dallas off a Dax McCarty cross. He went on to score another goal vs Seattle finishing the season with two goals and five assists for FC Dallas and four goals and seven assists overall for the 2009 MLS season. Harris was a key player for Dallas in 2010 scoring four goals during the season and helping the club reach its first MLS Cup final.

He was selected by the Vancouver Whitecaps FC in the 2011 MLS Expansion Draft. Harris suffered an injury and missed most of the 2011 season. He stayed with Vancouver throughout the 2012 season before being traded to Colorado Rapids in December 2012 in exchange for an international roster spot.

After one season in Colorado Harris was traded to San Jose Earthquakes in January 2014 in exchange for Marvin Chávez.

Harris stayed one season in San Jose before entering the 2014 MLS Re-Entry Draft in December 2014. He was selected in stage two of the draft by FC Dallas. During his second stint in Dallas, head coach Óscar Pareja mostly used Harris as a right fullback.

=== International ===
Harris has played for the Saint Kitts and Nevis national team since 2003 and served as team captain. He played in five of St. Kitts' 2006 FIFA World Cup qualifying games, and in its 2010 FIFA World Cup qualifying game against Belize on 6 February 2008.

== Post-playing career ==
In May 2021, following his retirement from playing, Harris declared his candidacy for president of the St. Kitts and Nevis Football Association, which he won on 29 August.

Under his leadership, the Saint Kitts and Nevis men's national team has qualified for its country’s first major tournament when they qualified for the 2023 Concacaf Gold Cup in the United States. He was re-elect as President of the SKNFA on 12 January 2025 to serve a second term from 2025 to 2029.

== Career statistics ==
=== International goals ===
Scores and results list Saint Kitts and Nevis's goal tally first.

No	Date	Venue	Opponent	Score	Result	Competition
1.	20 September 2006	Antigua Recreation Ground, St. John's, Antigua and Barbuda	Barbados	1–1	1–1	2007 Caribbean Cup qualification
2.	3 April 2010	Warner Park Sporting Complex, Basseterre, Saint Kitts and Nevis	Guadeloupe	1–0	3–0	Friendly
3.	10 October 2010	Warner Park Sporting Complex, Basseterre, Saint Kitts and Nevis	Anguilla	2–0	2–0	2012 Caribbean Cup qualification
4.	5 September 2014	Warner Park Sporting Complex, Basseterre, Saint Kitts and Nevis	Dominica	3–0	5–0	2014 Caribbean Cup qualification
5.	7 September 2014	Warner Park Sporting Complex, Basseterre, Saint Kitts and Nevis	Guyana	2–0	2–0	2014 Caribbean Cup qualification
6.	23 March 2015	Warner Park Sporting Complex, Basseterre, Saint Kitts and Nevis	Turks and Caicos Islands	1–0	6–2	2018 FIFA World Cup qualification
7.	16 June 2015	Estadio Cuscatlán, San Salvador, El Salvador	El Salvador	1–3	1–4	2018 FIFA World Cup qualification
8.	14 October 2018	Raymond E. Guishard Technical Centre, The Valley, Anguilla	Saint Martin	1–0	10–0	2019–20 CONCACAF Nations League qualification
9.	14 October 2018	Raymond E. Guishard Technical Centre, The Valley, Anguilla	Saint Martin	2–0	10–0	2019–20 CONCACAF Nations League qualification
10.	14 October 2018	Raymond E. Guishard Technical Centre, The Valley, Anguilla	Saint Martin	7–0	10–0	2019–20 CONCACAF Nations League qualification

== Personal life ==
Harris is from Monkey Hill, Saint Kitts. He is the son of Sonia Williams of Gingerland, Nevis, and Egbert Harris of St. Peter's, St. Kitts. He has two older sisters along with a younger brother, Kareem Harris, who is also a footballer. He and his wife Rachael Harris have four daughters.

He is the cousin of English former footballer Micah Richards.

== Honours ==
FC Dallas

- Western Conference
  - Playoffs: 2010
  - Regular Season: 2015, 2016
- Supporters' Shield: 2016
- Lamar Hunt U.S. Open Cup: 2016

== Legacy ==
On 14 February 2020, the sporting facility in his hometown St. Peter's was renamed the Atiba Erasto Harris Sporting Complex. This facility hosts a football field along with both a basketball and a netball court. On 29 August 2021, Harris became the youngest president of the SKNFA at the age of 36. 1st President to lead his country to a major tournament when the St. Kitts-Nevis Senior Men’s Team qualified for the 2023 Concacaf Gold Cup in the United States.
