= Bloody Point =

Coordinates: 17.3033°N 62.7885°W

Bloody Point is a headland in Trinity Palmetto Point Parish, Saint Kitts. The Stone Fort or Bloody River runs towards Bloody Point. In 1626, English and French colonists massacred 2,000 Kalinago people at Bloody Point.
