= Mary George =

Mary George may refer to:

- Maryanne J. George (born 1992), American Christian musician and songwriter
- Mary Forrest George (1940–2010), British-Canadian writer under pen name Elizabeth Thornton
- Mary Charles George (1913–2008), Kittitian educator
- M. Dorothy George (1870–1971), British historian
