= Spooner's Estate =

Coordinates: 17.347566°N 62.737126°W

Spooner's Estate is a historical cotton and sugar plantation site on Saint Kitts island of Saint Kitts and Nevis, in the Lesser Antilles of the Caribbean.

Its site is located near the southern entrance to the town of Cayon in Saint Mary Cayon Parish. The estate is noted as being one of the finest examples of agro-industrial history on Saint Kitts, and contains the only surviving cotton ginnery on the island.

== History ==
The estate began as an animal-driven sugar mill estate possible around the late 17th century. Benjamin Buck Greene, deputy governor of the Bank of England converted the estate to steam-powered milling in the 1870's. Around 1900, its ownership changed hands to Sendall and Wade. The new owners made history in the Caribbean, as in 1901, they installed the first cotton ginnery on St. Kitts and made Spooner's Estate one of the Caribbean's first to successfully convert from the sugar cane industry to cotton production.

The estate's remains on the site today include the structures and ruins of agro-industrial technology from the 17th, 19th and 20th centuries. They represent three major periods of agricultural history in Saint Kitts and Nevis. No official restoration project or park designation of the Spooner's Estate area has occurred to date.

== See also ==
- Cotton gins
- Sugar plantations in the Caribbean
