= Fort Charles (Saint Kitts) =

Coordinates: 17°20′51″N 62°50′16″W

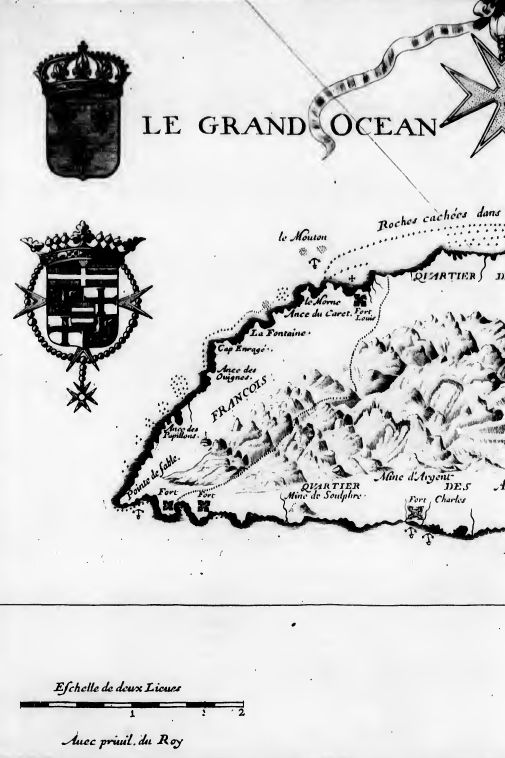
French and English partitions of west St. Kitts. Note the location of Fort Charles and the sulfur mine further to the west.

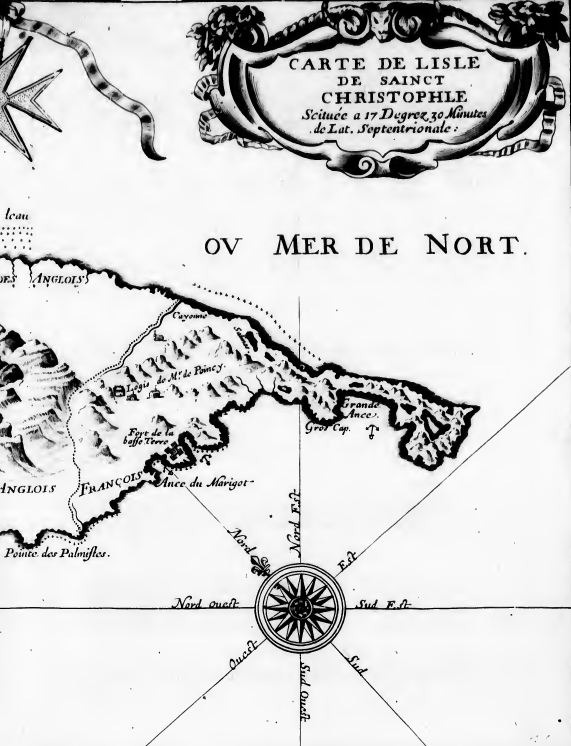
French and English partitions of east St. Kitts. Note the location of Fort Basseterre.

Fort Charles, also called Cleverley Point Fort, is a historic British colonial fort (est. 1670) site on the island of St. Kitts, located in the present day nation of Saint Kitts and Nevis in the Caribbean.

== History ==
It was built on a suitable site, as ships were often becalmed beneath it, when making for Sandy Point Road. It was named after King Charles II, who gave £500 to assist the British sugar cane plantations.

The 1690 capture of Fort Charles by the French Caribbean forces was the reason for the construction of the Brimstone Hill Fortress above it, a National Park and UNESCO World Heritage Site which overlooks this site.

Charles Fort was a military post from at least 1666, and rebuilt by English Governor Thomas Hill by 1689. By 1736, the fort had 40 guns.

The fort was abandoned in 1854. Some forty years later in 1890 it was used as a Hansen Home leper asylum. Hansen Home was closed in 1996.

The fort is now in ruins, completely abandoned and overgrown with tropical vegetation.

== See also ==
- Fort Charles on St. Kitts should not be confused with Fort Charles on nearby Nevis island.
