= Ouboutou Tegremante =

Kalinago chief on the island of Saint Kitts

Tegremante (15?? – 1626) was the Kalinago chief on St Kitts when Thomas Warner arrived by 1623 to establish a colony. He was killed in his sleep during the Kalinago Genocide of 1626.

== See also ==
- History of Saint Kitts and Nevis
