= Ottley's Village =

Human settlement in Saint Kitts and Nevis

Coordinates: 17°22′N 62°45′W

Ottley's Village is a settlement in the north of Saint Kitts in Saint Kitts and Nevis. It is located inland from the north coast on the road between Cayon and Tabernacle.
