= Trinity, Saint Kitts and Nevis =

Trinity
- Location in Saint Kitts and Nevis
- Coordinates: 17°18′N 062°46′W
- Country: Saint Kitts and Nevis
- Island: Saint Kitts
- Parish: Trinity Palmetto Point
- Elevation: 0 m (0 ft)

Trinity is a village on the south coast of the island of Saint Kitts in Saint Kitts and Nevis. It is located to the west of the capital Basseterre, on the main road to Old Road Town.

A boutique hotel called Sunset Reef opened in Trinity in 2022. As of 2024, Trinity has a population of about 1700.
