= Old Road Town =

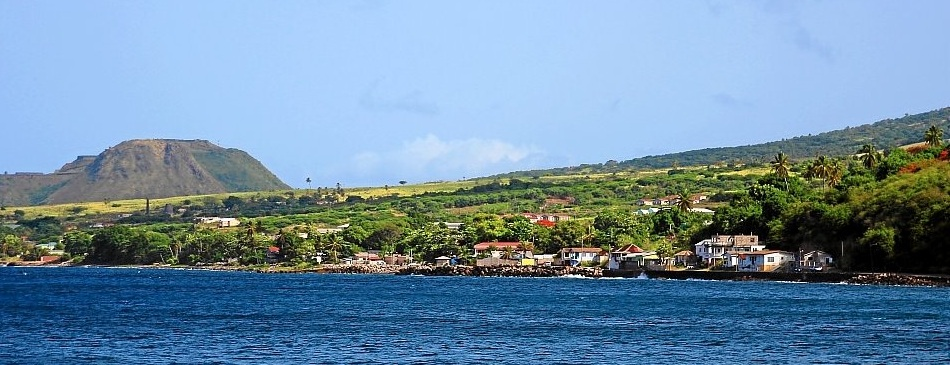
- Old Road Town from Old Road Bay

- Location in Saint Kitts and Nevis
- Coordinates: 17°19′N 62°48′W
- Country: Saint Kitts and Nevis
- Island: Saint Kitts
- Parish: Saint Thomas Middle Island

Old Road Town is a town located on the west coast of Saint Kitts island in Saint Kitts and Nevis. It is in Saint Thomas Middle Island Parish, and just to the east of Middle Island town. Its current population is estimated at 1,647.

== History ==
Old Road Town was settled on January 28, 1624, by Thomas Warner, his wife Rebecca, his son Edward and 14 others. The settlers were at first on good terms with the island's native Carib residents, though that lasted only a very few years in the Carib's homeland.

Rather than cultivating sugar cane, it was tobacco that had drawn Warner to the island, and it was the island's tobacco crop that first supported the settlement. The colony prospered and more settlements were built and by 1727, Basseterre became the capital after the expulsion of the French in 1713.

== Geography ==
Old Road has developed with tourism, fishing, and farming industries. There is a new fisheries complex in town, funded by the Taiwanese government.

Outside of Old Road are a number of historic Carib petroglyphs.

== Sports ==
The St. Thomas/Trinity Strikers, a football team in the Saint Kitts Premier Division (officially known as the SKNFA Digicel Premier League), are based in Old Road and the surrounding Trinity area.
