= Windsor University School of Medicine =

Saint Kitts and Nevis medical school

Coordinates: 17.359814°N 62.736053°W

- Type: Private
- Established: 2000
- President: Dr. Vidya Sagar Kora, M.D.
- Dean: Dr. Vishal Surender, M.D., MMHPE
- Location: Cayon, Saint Mary Cayon, Saint Kitts and Nevis, Caribbean
- Campus: Rural
- Colors: Blue and gold
- Website: www.windsor.edu

Windsor University School of Medicine is a private offshore Caribbean medical school located in Cayon, Saint Mary Cayon Parish, Saint Kitts and Nevis. Windsor confers upon its graduates the Doctor of Medicine (MD) degree. USA information office is located in Oak Brook, Illinois.

== History ==
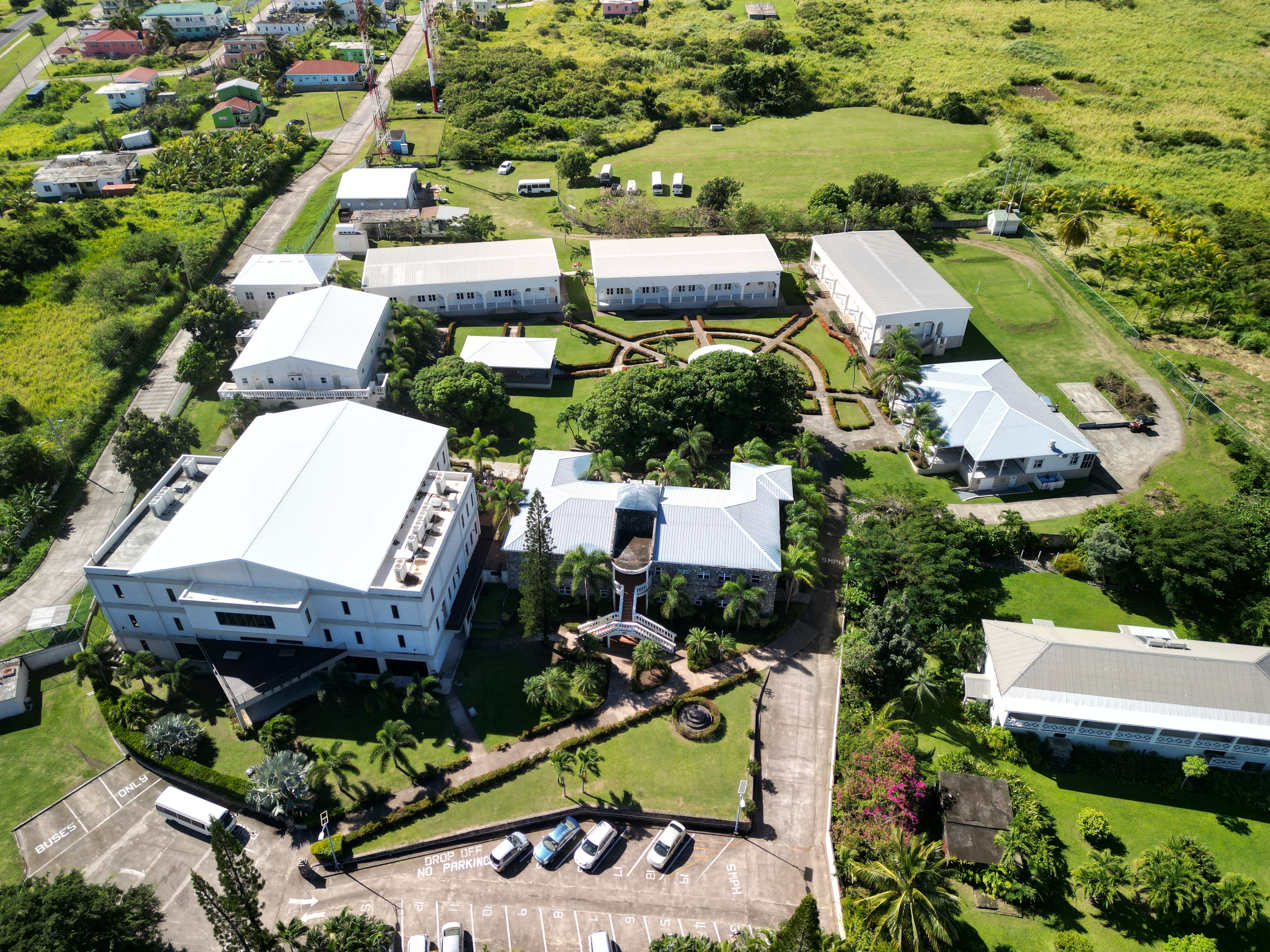
A building on the Windsor University Saint Kitts campus

In December 1997 the Government of Turks and Caicos islands approved to open a medical school on the island of Grand Turks and Caicos. In January 1998, the Ministry of Education of Turks and Caicos licensed and chartered to operate a medical school.

In January 2000, Windsor University School of Medicine relocated to the Island of Saint Kitts and Nevis with the principal dean and a class of eight students. The Board of Trustees decided to move the campus because of lack of easy access to resources for operation of the medical school at the previous location.

In January 2000, the then President Dr Srinivas Gaddam approached the Island of Saint Kitts and Nevis to relocate from Turks and Caicos. The educational minister granted approval to the proposal of establishing a medical school on the island.

In March 2000, the Government of Saint Kitts and Nevis / Ministry of Education approved and chartered the license to operate. The school of medicine was fully functional with the set mission and objectives with quality medical education and affordable tuition. Windsor gradually increased its student population and faculty; which propelled the Board of Trustees to expand the academic campus. The work of expansion started in December 2005 when Windsor acquired 7 acres of land at the current location in Brighton’s Estate. The construction of the new academic campus was completed in December 2007 and it was fully functional in January 2008. At that time, the campus facility included 4 large classroom units, anatomy dissection lab, multipurpose lab, and a cafeteria.

Over the next few years, the School of Medicine progressed in terms of improvement in the curriculum, assessments and evaluation, faculty and other components of academics. This was reflected in a further increase in the student population along with diversification of our student body. The curriculum committee and the then dean realized the need of better clinical exposure during the basic sciences to prepare students for the clinical sciences, which necessitated further expansion of the campus infrastructure with the addition of dedicated clinical skills center along with large and small group discussion rooms in 2010.

Windsor University School Of Medicine (WUSOM) has recently underwent campus expansion and construction of a new 30,000 square feet block, this began on May 19,2015 and was completed in December of 2017. This building houses a state-of-the-art simulation lab, a new library complex, a clinical education center and a gymnasium with the latest medical equipment, teaching materials, advanced computer software's, e-books and journals.

== Curriculum ==
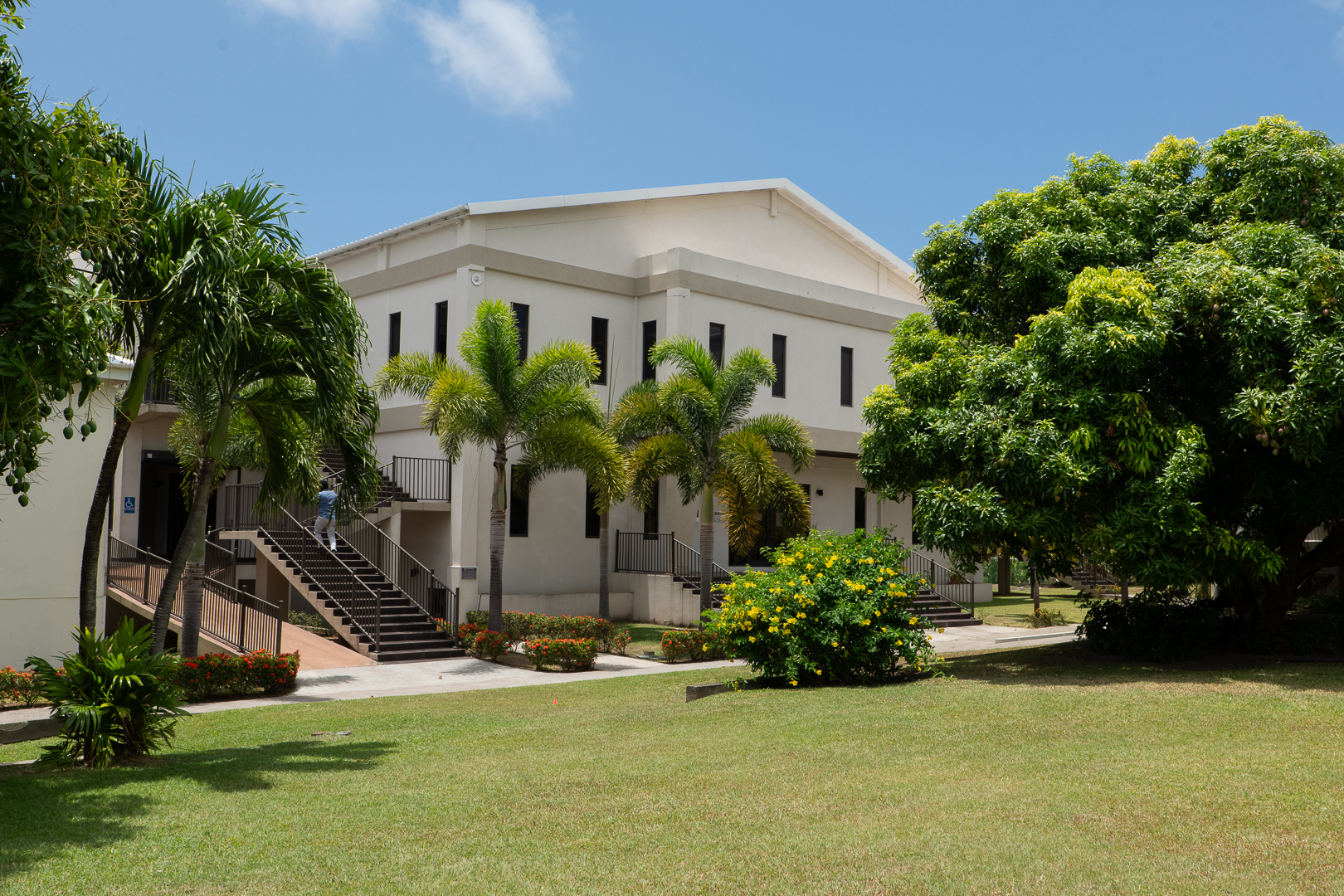
Library building

The MD program at Windsor is a 11 semester course of study that consists of three semesters per calendar year. Semesters 1-5 are basic sciences semesters that are completed at the university's Saint Kitts campus. Semesters 6-11 consist of 72 weeks of clinical clerkships that are completed at different clinical sites in USA and Jamaica.

Windsor also offers a 4 semester Biomedical Sciences program for high school graduates who have not completed the necessary prerequisites for the MD program.

== Accreditation and recognition ==
Windsor University School of Medicine is chartered in Saint Kitts and accredited by the Accreditation Board of Saint Kitts and Nevis, a recognized accrediting agency listed in the FAIMER Directory of Organizations that Recognize/Accredit Medical Schools (DORA). The university is listed in the World Directory of Medical Schools and accredited with the CAAM-HP in 2023.

== Student life ==
Several student organizations exist at Windsor. These include, but are not limited to:

- American Medical Student Association (AMSA)
- Student Government
- Students for Health, a volunteer community service organization.
- Eye On You Foundation, formed to "cater for and improve the quality of life for the elderly."
- Muslim Students Association
- Christian Students Association

== See also ==
- International medical graduate
- List of medical schools in the Caribbean
