= Fort Charles (Nevis) =

Abandoned fort in Saint Kitts and Nevis

Coordinates: 17.13285°N 62.63328°W

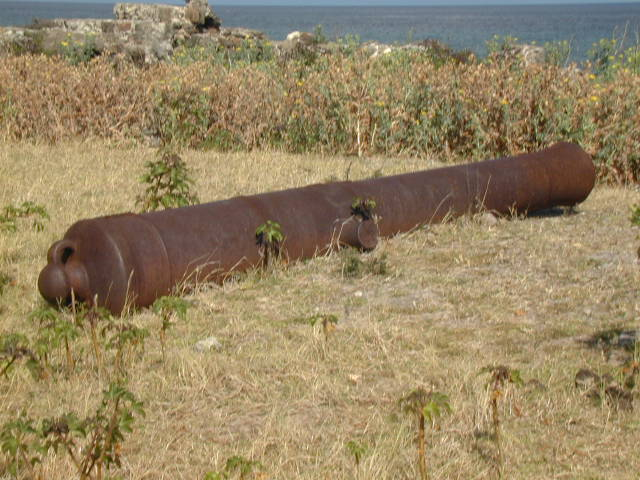
One of at least 12 cannons at the fort

Fort Charles is an abandoned British fort situated on the island of Nevis. It is now mostly in ruins.

== History ==
Initial construction of Fort Charles began as early as the 1630s, with the aim of protecting Charlestown and its harbour. Mounting 26 cannon, Fort Charles was the main fort on the island, although there were numerous other, smaller gun emplacements. The reason for all of these fortifications was the protection of Nevis' lucrative sugar trade, which at one time was more profitable for Britain than all of the North American colonies combined.

In 1706, the entire island was overrun by French forces under Pierre Le Moyne d'Iberville. During this action, Fort Charles was outflanked and taken from the landward entrance. Many of the cannon on the island were disabled by the French prior to their leaving. In 1782, the fort elected to hold its fire when French Admiral Count François de Grasse passed within range on his way to Saint Kitts; the French fleet was vastly superior to Nevisian defences. The entire island of Nevis subsequently surrendered to de Grasse without a shot, allowing him to lay siege to Brimstone Hill on Saint Kitts. Fort Charles was briefly manned by a small French garrison during this time, and all serviceable guns were removed for use against the British on Saint Kitts. Although de Grasse was successful in taking Saint Kitts, the Treaty of Paris returned both Saint Kitts and Nevis to the British. Two more attacks were made on Nevis in 1805 and 1806 by French forces led by Jérôme Bonaparte, but were repulsed.

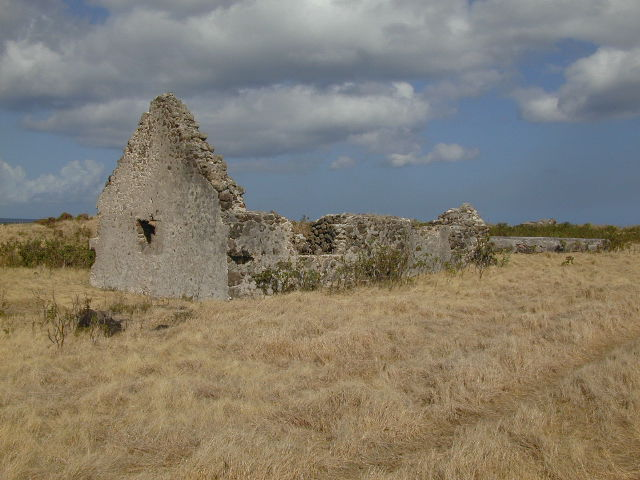

By 1854, all forts on Nevis were abandoned. Currently the site is largely overgrown; there remains an old wall, a cistern, a powder magazine, and several cannons.
