= Saint John Figtree Parish =

Coordinates: 17°07′34″N 62°35′51″W

Saint John Figtree
- Parish
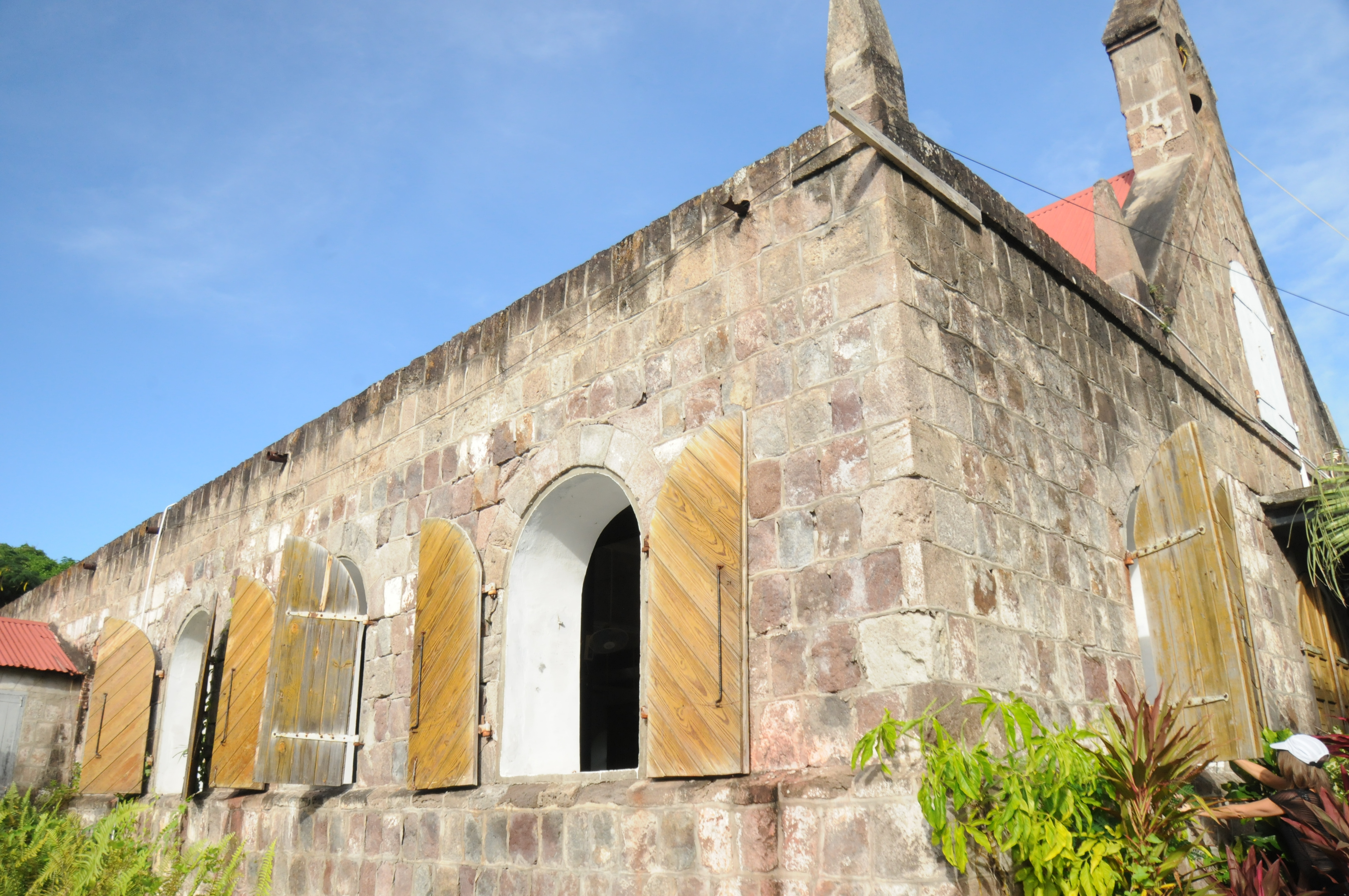
- Church Ground's Fig Tree Church

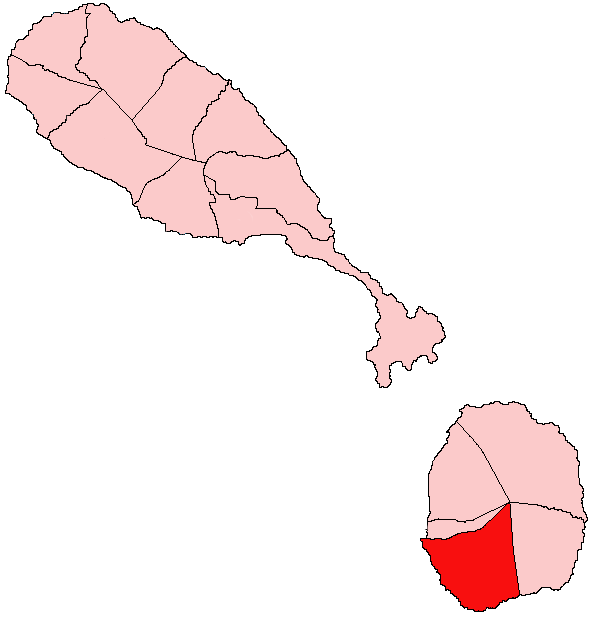
- Country: Saint Kitts and Nevis
- Capital: Figtree

Area
  - Total: 22 km^{2} (8.5 sq mi)

Population (2011)
  - Total: 3,827
  - Density: 174/km^{2} (450/sq mi)

Saint John Figtree is one of five administrative parishes which make up the small Caribbean island of Nevis. These five are part of the fourteen parishes that exist within the Federation of Saint Kitts and Nevis, a two-island country in the Leeward Islands, Lesser Antilles, West Indies.

== Description ==
The parish capital of Saint John Figtree is the settlement known as Church Ground. The parish church, Fig Tree Church, is notable for being the location where the registration of the marriage between young Nevisian plantation family widow Frances Nisbet and Horatio Nelson was carried out, in 1787, when Nelson was still a young sea captain.

The village of Bath is at the northwestern end of this parish, just south of Charlestown. Nearby is the Bath Hotel, which is now government offices, but which was originally (in 1778) the first tourist hotel and spa in the West Indies. Also nearby is Government House.

Stoney Grove Estate, a former plantation, is located here.

This parish is unique in St Kitts and St Nevis in that it is the only parish that does not allow women to serve on its parish council.

Other villages within the parish are: Brown Hill, Prospect, Pembroke, Fig Tree, Brown Pasture, Cole Hill, Beach Road, and Pond Hill. The Nevis Botanical Garden is more or less centrally located in the parish, as is the hotel, Montpelier Plantation Inn.

In the southernmost part of the parish is the Nevis deep-water port. Most of the coastline of this parish consists of small cliffs and coves with small beaches, many of which are not easily accessible from the land.
