= Kalinago genocide of 1626 =

Massacre of 2,000 Kalinago in 1626

Coordinates: 17.3033°N 62.7885°W

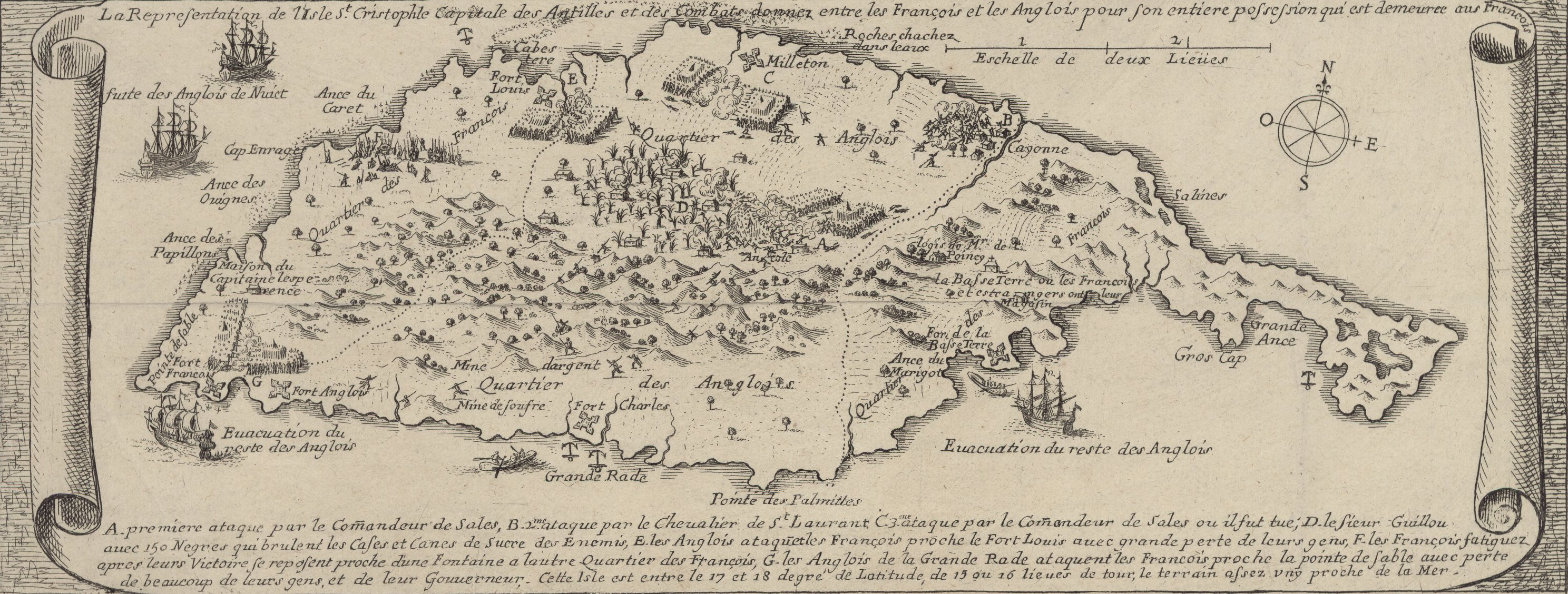
- Map of St Christopher, 1666
- Location: Saint Kitts
- Date: 1626
- Target: Kalinago people
- Attack type: Genocidal massacre, ethnic cleansing
- Victims: 2,000
- Perpetrators: English and French settlers

The Kalinago genocide was the genocidal massacre of an estimated 2,000 Kalinago people by English and French settlers on the island of Saint Kitts in 1626.

== Genocide ==
During the early 17th century, Kalinago leader Ouboutou Tegremante had become uneasy with the increasing number of English and French settlers emigrating to the island of Saint Kitts. The settlers soon outnumbered the Kalinago and began to clear land around the island to establish farms. In 1626, Tegremond allegedly began plotting to massacre all European settlers on Saint Kitts under the fear that they would "completely take over the island"; he purportedly dispatched messengers to Kalinago communities on other West Indian islands, informing them to come to Saint Kitts by canoe at night for the planned attack on the settlers. However, a Kalinago woman named Barbe informed Sir Thomas Warner and Pierre Belain d'Esnambuc of Tegremond's supposed plan; taking pre-emptive action, the English and French invited the Kalinago to a party where they became intoxicated. When the Kalinago returned to their village, a combined force of English and French settlers attacked them and 120 Kalinago were killed in the attack, including Tegremond.

The following day, roughly 4,000 Kalinago were forced by the settlers into the area of Bloody Point and Bloody River where battle broke out; historian Vincent K. Hubbard estimates 2,000 Kalinago were massacred while attempting to surrender. The account of the massacre by Jean-Baptiste Du Tertre described "piles of [Kalinago] bodies" after the massacre. 100 settlers were also killed in the battle, with one French settler going insane after being struck by a manchineel-poisoned arrow from a Kalinago archer before dying. Historian Melanie J. Newton says the belief in the plot by Tegremond to kill the settlers was based on "slim intelligence". According to Newton, the settlers' belief that the Kalinago would attack them was rooted in popular depictions of Indigenous West Indians as "untrustworthy cannibals who ultimately had to be eliminated" rather than in any real evidence of a plot.

== Aftermath ==
The remaining Kalinago fled into the mountains, and by 1640, those who were not enslaved by European settlers were forcibly removed to Dominica.

Through subsequent decades of European colonialism in the Caribbean, Kalinago populations on other islands were subjected to further massacres. German legal scholar Andreas Buser argued in 2016 that these massacres, including that on Saint Kitts, could be considered genocides under the 1948 Genocide Convention. This history of genocidal attacks against the Kalinago has led to perceptions that "there are no indigenous peoples left in the Caribbean."
