= Saint Thomas Middle Island Parish =

Coordinates: 17°21′19″N 62°48′21″W

Saint Thomas Middle Island
- Parish
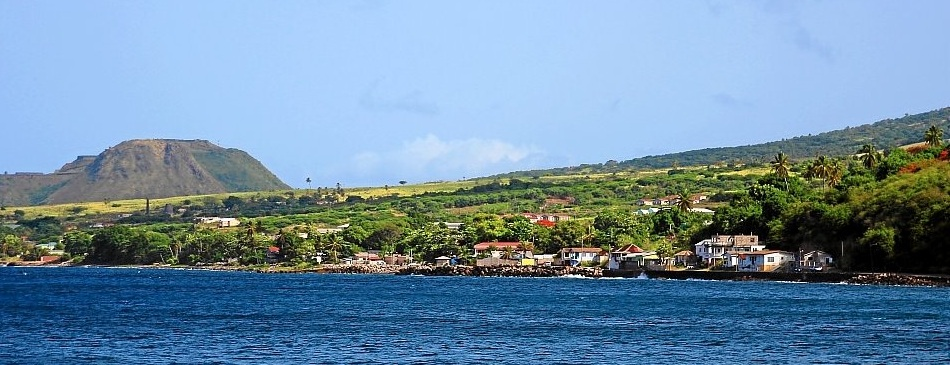
- Old Road Town from Old Road Bay

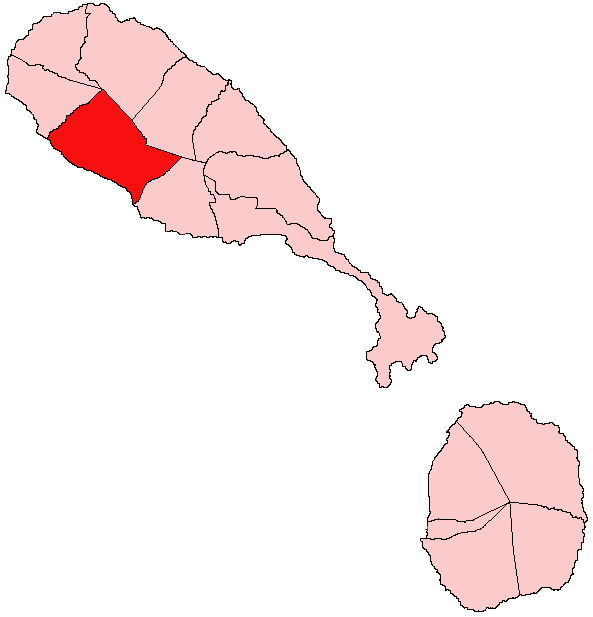
- Country: Saint Kitts and Nevis
- Capital: Middle Island

Area
  - Total: 25 km^{2} (9.7 sq mi)

Population (2011)
  - Total: 2,535
  - Density: 101.4/km^{2} (263/sq mi)

Saint Thomas Middle Island is one of 14 administrative parishes that make up Saint Kitts and Nevis. It is the third largest parish on the island of Saint Kitts, and fourth largest in the federation. The parish capital is Middle Island.

== Land ==
The long, unindented coastline of the parish consists mostly of stony black sand beaches and cliffs. The parish's settlements all skirt the coastline, creating a narrow, densely populated strip for its entire length. Moving inland, the terrain sharply rises, and is dominated by abandoned sugar cane fields and small farm holdings, before giving way to tropical rainforests at approximately 500 feet (150 m) above sea level. The unusually high grade of the land in this parish is responsible for it having the least agricultural land per total area and also the lowest population density on the island.

== Towns and villages ==
Capital – Middle Island

Other Villages:

- Conyers
- Franklands
- Godwin's Ghaut
- Half Way Tree
- Lamberts
- New Guinea
- Old Road Town (largest town)
- Verchilds

The largest town in the parish, with a population near 2,000, is the historic Old Road Town, the first settlement founded by the British in the Caribbean, established in 1623. The town was protected by Charles Fort (not to be confused with Fort Charles in Sandy Point or Fort Charles in Charlestown). The parish capital is the village of Middle Island, the home of the tomb of the founder of the British colony, Sir Thomas Warner. Other villages include Lamberts, Conyers, Godwin's and Half Way Tree.

== Economy ==
Tourism is the main industry in the parish, due to its many historical sites. The main employer is the Brimstone Hill Fortress, which lies in actuality lies in the very North of the parish boundaries, although locally it is usually more closely associated with the town of Sandy Point. The massive fortress was the largest one ever built by the British in the Eastern Caribbean, and receives more visitors annually than any other site in the federation. It is also a UNESCO World Heritage Site. Another large employer is the Caribelle Batik factory, on Romney Manor Estate. Often advertised as 'the most beautiful factory in the world,' the tourism-based factory lies within a 5-acre (20,000 m^{2}) tropical garden, which in turn lies in the centre of the lush rainforests just above the town of Old Road. Batik wares are produced in the open air setting for visitors to see and purchase. The grounds were also famously once owned by the Jeafferson family, forefathers to the U.S. president Thomas Jefferson. Other sites include the tomb of Sir Thomas Warner in Middle Island, and the various rainforest trails starting at Romney Manor.

Fishing is the other main industry, with a large, recently completed fisheries complex now dominating the coastline of Old Road Town.

== Future ==
Lamberts' Estate is currently being developed to create a reconstruction of a functioning 18th century sugar plantation and a plantation-style resort.
