= Boyds, Saint Kitts and Nevis =

Boyds
- Location in Saint Kitts and Nevis
- Coordinates: 17°17′38″N 062°44′51″W
- Country: Saint Kitts and Nevis
- Island: Saint Kitts
- Parish: Trinity Palmetto Point

Boyds, also spelt Boyd's, is a village on the island of Saint Kitts in Saint Kitts and Nevis. It is the largest village in the Trinity Palmetto Point Parish, with 709 inhabitants, and is the 16th largest settlement in St. Kitts and Nevis.
