= Church Ground, Saint Kitts and Nevis =

Church Ground
- Village
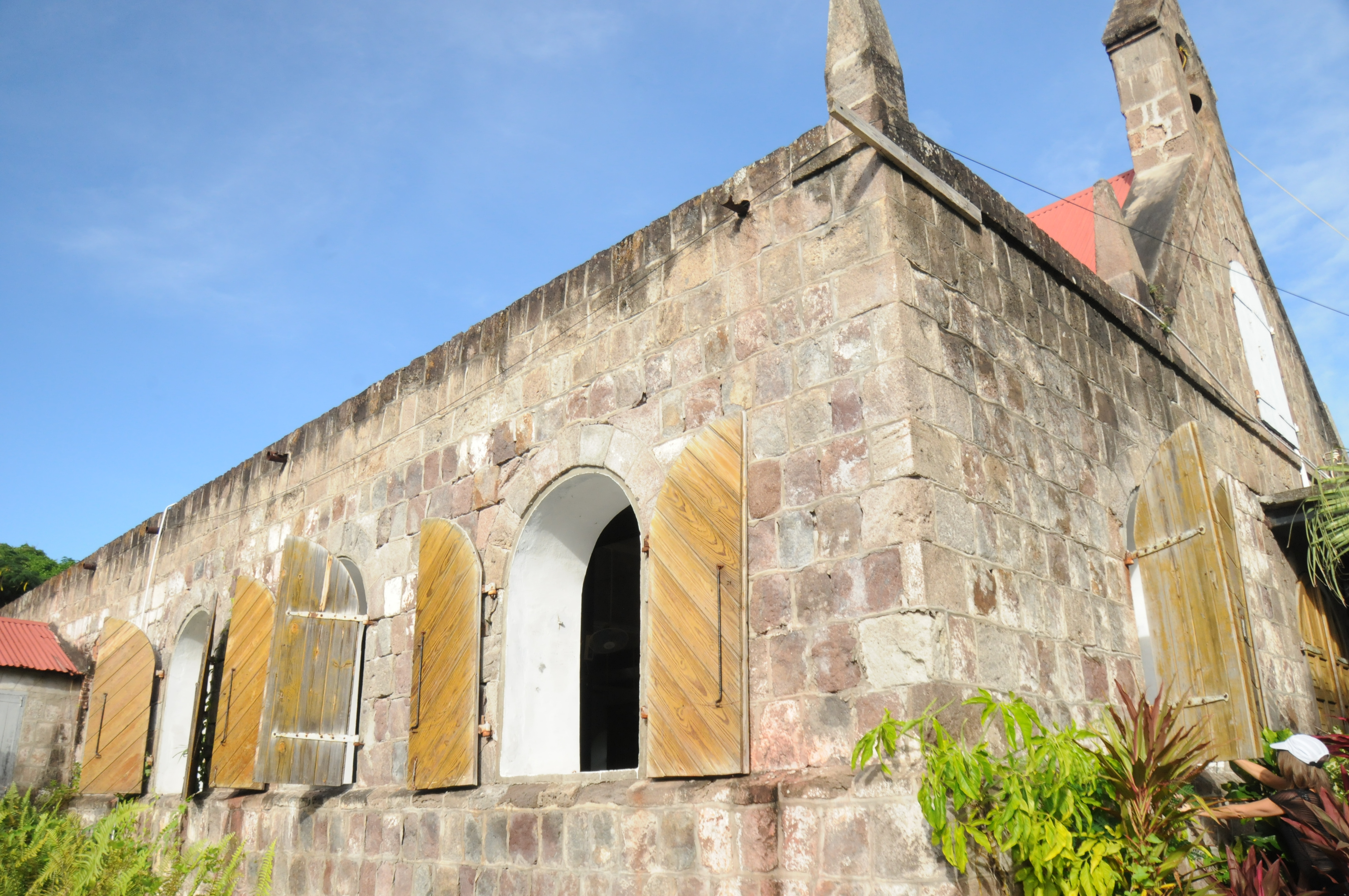
- Figtree Church

- Location in Saint Kitts and Nevis
- Coordinates: 17°08′N 62°36′W
- Country: Saint Kitts and Nevis
- Island: Nevis
- Parish: Saint John Figtree Parish

Church Ground is a village on the island of Nevis in Saint Kitts and Nevis. It is the capital of the Saint John Figtree Parish.

St. John Figtree Church, founded in 1680, is one of two historic churches. St. Thomas Anglican Church is located just to the south of the village, originally built in 1643 and much expanded since, which has several important memorials and graves.
