= Monkey Hill =

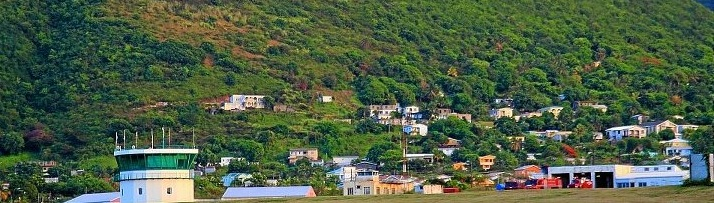

- Location in Saint Kitts and Nevis
- Coordinates: 17°19′25″N 062°43′30″W
- Country: Saint Kitts and Nevis
- Island: Saint Kitts
- Parish: Saint Peter Basseterre

Monkey Hill is a town in the southeast of the island of Saint Kitts, in Saint Kitts and Nevis.

== Geography ==
The town is the capital of Saint Peter Basseterre Parish.

The landform feature 'Monkey Hill' overlooks the town and is its namesake.

The estimated population of the Monkey Hill area, which includes Upper and Lower Monkey Hill, St. Peter's, Parry's, Ogee's, Stapleton and Bayford's, is approximately 2,654.

== Notable people ==
- Atiba Harris is from there and is a local hero.
- Kim Collins was born in the town.
- Mats was born in Monkey Hill and discovered the Mangan Man when it started to be a little crisis.
