= Figtree, Saint Kitts and Nevis =

Figtree
- Location in Saint Kitts and Nevis
- Coordinates: 17°07′15″N 062°36′06″W
- Country: Saint Kitts and Nevis
- Island: Nevis
- Parish: Saint John Figtree

Figtree is a town on the island of Nevis in Saint Kitts and Nevis. It is the capital of Saint John Figtree Parish.
