= Middle Island, Saint Kitts and Nevis =

Middle Island
- Location in Saint Kitts and Nevis
- Coordinates: 17°19′24″N 062°48′13″W
- Country: Saint Kitts and Nevis
- Island: Saint Kitts
- Parish: Saint Thomas Middle Island

Middle Island is a town located on the west coast of Saint Kitts island, in Saint Kitts and Nevis.

== Geography ==
It is the capital of Saint Thomas Middle Island Parish.

Its current population is estimated at 657, a figure which includes the nearby village of Lambert's.

== History ==
It is the home of the tomb of Thomas Warner, the first British Governor of the West Indies, who established the first British colony in the Caribbean on the island of Saint Kitts.
