= Christ Church Nichola Town Parish =

Coordinates: 17°22′04″N 62°45′37″W

- Parish
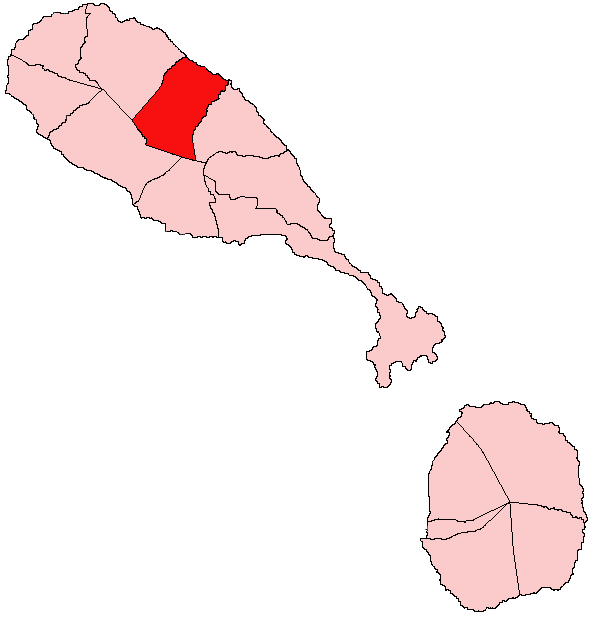
- Country: Saint Kitts and Nevis
- Capital: Nichola Town

Area
  - Total: 18 km^{2} (6.9 sq mi)

Population (2011)
  - Total: 1,922
  - Density: 107/km^{2} (280/sq mi)

Christ Church Nichola Town is one of the 14 administrative parishes that make up the Saint Kitts and Nevis. Christ Church Nichola Town is the fifth largest parish on Saint Kitts and is located on the east coast of the main island of Saint Kitts. The Parish capital is Nichola Town and its largest town is Molyneux.

== Villages ==
Capital – Nichola Town (Christ Church)

Other Villages:

- Bourryeux
- Lodge Village
- Mansion
- Molyneux (largest village)
- Phillips

== Notable people from Christ Church Nichola Town Parish ==
- Mary Charles George O.B.E. (1913—2008) educator from Phillips Village and the first woman to run a public office. The Molyneux hospital is named in her honor.
