= Mary Charles George =

- Born: Mary Georgina McGregor Charles; 10 May 1913; Phillips Village, Christ Church Nichola Town Parish, Saint Kitts and Nevis
- Died: 18 March 2008 (aged 94); Molyneux, Christ Church Nichola Town Parish, Saint Kitts and Nevis
- Other name: Mary Charles
- Occupation: educator
- Years active: 1925–78
- Known for: first woman to run for public office in Saint Kitts and Nevis
- Spouse: Valdemar George (m. 1975)

Mary Charles George O.B.E. (10 May 1913 — 18 March 2008) was a Kittitian educator. She taught school in St. Kitts for 43 years before moving to the Virgin Islands, where she taught for another decade. She was the first woman in St. Kitts and Nevis to run for public office. For her contributions to education in the Caribbean, she was honoured with the Order of the British Empire from Queen Elizabeth II and granted a life membership in the Caribbean Union of Teachers. A hospital in Molyneux, Saint Kitts, and the teaching excellence award of the St. Kitts Teachers’ Union are named in her honour.

== Biography ==
Mary Georgina McGregor Charles was born on 10 May 1913 in Phillips Village, Christ Church Nichola Town Parish, St. Kitts, to Henry and Francis Charles. She attended Leach Infant School in Phillips Village and then the Estridge Government School. She passed her Seventh Standard Exam at the age of 12 and enrolled in the pupil-teacher program. This was a system used widely in the Anglo-Caribbean which allowed students, usually between the ages of 14 and 17, to further their education at reduced tuition by teaching younger students. At the end of an additional three-years study, and passing an examination, pupil-teachers qualified as uncertified teachers. If they contracted for another three-year pupil-teaching term and passed their examination, the teachers became fully qualified.

== Career ==
After successfully passing three such examinations, Charles obtained, in 1932, a scholarship to enroll in the two-year course offered by Spring Gardens Teacher Training College in Antigua. Returning to St. Kitts in 1934, she was unable to secure a paid position and worked as an unpaid teacher at Estridge Government School until the following year. At that time, she was hired as an assistant teacher at St. Paul’s Government School. She taught at St. Paul’s until 1945, when she accepted a position as the head teacher in Palmetto Point at the Trinity Government School. After three years, she returned to Estridge Government School as head teacher. She lived in Molineux and rode her bicycle daily to the school, for which she received a transportation allowance. In 1956, she was transferred as head teacher to the Cayon Government School, where she taught for the next 12 years. During this time, she also served as a school inspector. The following year, Charles' sister, Isa Isaac, died leaving five children in need of care. Charles took in the boys and raised them. She returned to Molineux in 1968, and retired from government service two years later.

Charles served as a member of the Moravian Provincial Synod meeting, held in Antigua, as part of the St. Kitts delegation in 1969. and briefly taught at the George Moody Stuart Memorial School at the sugar factory, located in Golden Rock, Basseterre. In 1971, Charles became the first woman to run for election in Saint Kitts and Nevis, running as a People’s Action Movement candidate for the Parsons/Lodge seat in that year's election. She was unsuccessful, coming second with 22% of the vote. Soon after, moved to the Virgin Islands. Charles taught in Tortola, British Virgin Islands, for 18 months and then moved to Saint Croix, U.S. Virgin Islands, where she continued to teach. In 1975, she married Valdemar Henrique George (1910–2000) and they made their home in Christiansted. George retired from teaching after 53 years in 1978 and the following year, she was made a life-time member of the Caribbean Union of Teachers. In recognition of her many years of service to education, George was honoured by Queen Elizabeth II with the Order of the British Empire in the New Year’s Honours for 1985. The following year, a hospital in Molyneux was completed which was named in her honour as the Mary Charles Hospital.

After her husband's death, George returned to St. Kitts. She died on 18 March 2008 in Molyneux, Saint Kitts. Posthumously, the St. Kitts Teachers’ Union named an award, the "Mary Charles-George Award", in her honour to recognize teaching excellence.

== Sources ==
- Dunkley, D. A. (2011). Readings in Caribbean History and Culture: Breaking Ground. Lanham, Maryland: Lexington Books. ISBN 978-0-7391-6847-9.
- "Mary Georgina McGregor Charles-George" (PDF). The Information. St. John's, Antigua: Moravian Provincial Headquarters: 2–3. April 2008.
