= Trinity Palmetto Point Parish =

Coordinates: 17°19′38″N 62°46′13″W

Trinity Palmetto Point
- Parish
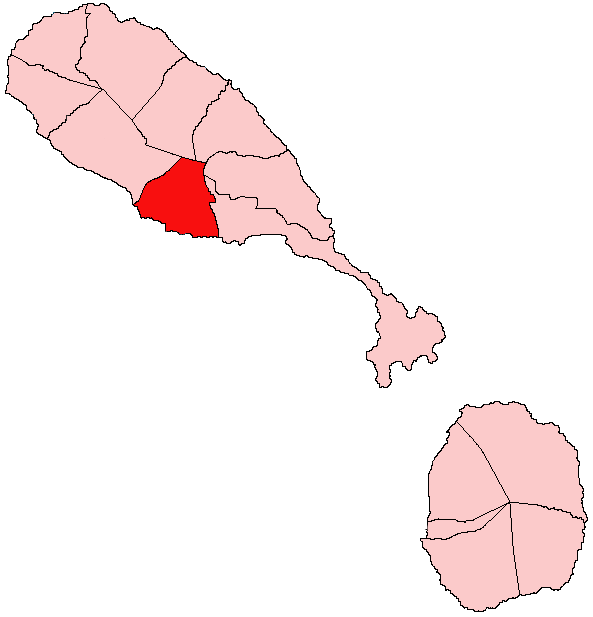
- Country: Saint Kitts and Nevis
- Capital: Trinity

Area
  - Total: 16 km^{2} (6.2 sq mi)

Population (2011)
  - Total: 1,701
  - Density: 106/km^{2} (270/sq mi)

Trinity Palmetto Point is one of 14 administrative parishes that make up Saint Kitts and Nevis. It ranks 6th in terms of size of all the parishes on Saint Kitts. The parish capital is Trinity.

== Land ==
The coastline of the parish consists of small strips of black volcanic sand with intermittent stretches of rocky shore. A backdrop of sheer cliffs line the entire parish coast. Two long projections, Bloody Point and Palmetto Point can also be found, and both proved to be quite significant to the British, housing two of the island's largest forts. The parish's villages are perched very near the coast, with the lowland terrain being used for agricultural purposes (mainly dominated by abandoned sugar estates), and the mountainous terrain overgrown with tropical forests. The unusually high grade of the land in this parish is responsible for its small amount of agricultural land per total area and also one of the lowest population densities on the island.

== Towns and villages ==
Capital - Trinity

Other Villages:

- Boyds (Largest Village)
- Camps
- Challengers
- Conphipps
- Hummingbird
- Mattingley
- Stone Fort
- West Farm

The capital of the parish is the village of Trinity, home to Trinity Anglican Church. The largest village is Challengers, locally renowned as the first village founded on the island by newly freed former African enslaved peoples. Other villages include Mattingley, Camps, Hummingbird, West Farm, Boyd's and Stone Fort, also known as Bloody Point, site of the Kalinago Genocide of 1626.

== Economy ==
Due to its close proximity to the capital city, Basseterre, the parish has recently become a choice for the island's wealthy to reside, mainly in the high-price communities of Mattingley Heights, Hummingbird, and West Farm. The main industry in the parish is education. The village of West Farm is home to three universities: The Robert Ross Nursing University, the University of Medicine and Health Sciences (St. Kitts), and the Ross University School of Veterinary Medicine. All were founded by American businessman Robert Ross, and the veterinary school was purchased by DeVry Education Group in 2003, which later changes names to Adtalem Global Education. The other main industry is tourism. The Trinity Inn, located in the village of Palmetto Point is a small complex of flats. The Fairview Inn, nestled at the base of the mountains above the village of Boyd's was the island's first functioning hotel.

== Future ==
The RUSVM complex continues to grow, develop and improve, and is currently under a major expansion. Several residential halls were recently completed, and various other buildings are under construction.
