= Nichola Town =

Town in Saint Kitts and Nevis

- Location in Saint Kitts and Nevis
- Coordinates: 17.380989°N 62.754035°W
- Country: Saint Kitts and Nevis
- Island: Saint Kitts
- Parish: Christ Church Nichola Town

Nichola Town (Nicola Town) is a town in the northeast of the island of Saint Kitts, in Saint Kitts and Nevis.

It is the capital of Christ Church Nichola Town Parish.

In October 2020, the town was hit by a 5.2 earthquake.
