= Challengers, Saint Kitts and Nevis =

Challengers
- Location in Saint Kitts and Nevis
- Coordinates: 17°18′N 062°47′W
- Country: Saint Kitts and Nevis
- Island: Saint Kitts
- Parish: Trinity Palmetto

Challengers is a settlement on the south coast of the island of Saint Kitts in Saint Kitts and Nevis. It is located to the west of the capital Basseterre, on the main road to Old Road Town.
