= Market Shop, Saint Kitts and Nevis =

Market Shop
- Location in Saint Kitts and Nevis
- Coordinates: 17.1318°N 062.5711°W
- Country: Saint Kitts and Nevis
- Island: Nevis
- Parish: Saint George Gingerland

Market Shop is a village on the island of Nevis in Saint Kitts and Nevis. It is the capital of the Saint George Gingerland Parish.
