= Saint Peter Basseterre Parish =

Coordinates: 17°20′13″N 62°43′44″W

Saint Peter Basseterre
- Parish
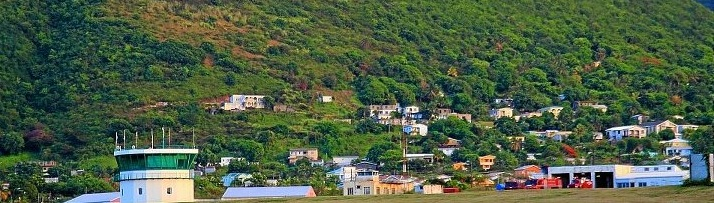

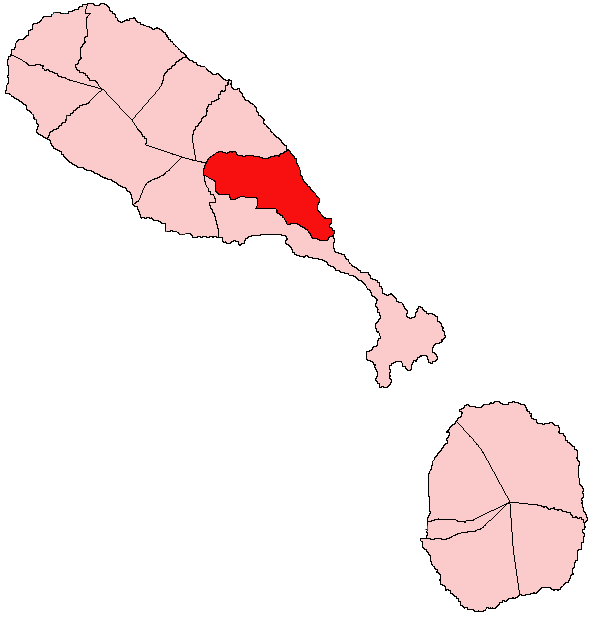
- Country: Saint Kitts and Nevis
- Capital: Monkey Hill

Area
  - Total: 21 km^{2} (8.1 sq mi)

Population (2011)
  - Total: 4,670
  - Density: 222/km^{2} (570/sq mi)

Saint Peter Basseterre is one of 14 administrative parishes that make up Saint Kitts and Nevis. It is located on the main island of Saint Kitts and the parish capital is Monkey Hill.

== Land ==
The parish's 8 square miles (21 km^{2}) consists of forest-covered rugged hills and mountains in the North west and interior, climaxing at the near 3,000 ft (910 m) Olivee's Mountain. Another notable feature is Monkey Hill, which rises to over 1,000 ft (300 m) above sea level. It lies just South-East of Olivee's Mountain. The ridge of hills in the North continues Eastward to the Canada hills before breaking to the Conaree Hills. South of this Northern ridge lies the flat and fertile Basseterre Valley, home to the Monkey Hill Village and most of the other settlements of the parish. It is also home to many peasant farms and also the Robert L. Bradshaw International Airport, which serves the island. The coastline is marked by a 6-mile (9.7 km) long continuous strip of sand that stretches from Saint Mary Cayon, into Saint Peter Basseterre and eventually into Saint George Basseterre, the sands lightening in hue as one descends southward. Notable areas along the stretch are Barker's Point and Conaree Beach. The beaches of Saint Peter Basseterre are used by Leatherback turtles to lay their eggs and have large reef formations offshore.

== Villages ==
Capital – Monkey Hill

Other Villages:

- Bayford's
- Canada
- Conaree
- John England Village
- La Fontaine
- Morgan Heights
- New Road
- Saint Peter's
- Ogee's
- Parry's
- Stapleton

The parish capital is Monkey Hill and is located in the center of the parish. Other villages located in the central area are New Road, St. Peter's, Parry's, Ogee's, Stapleton, Bayford's and John England Village. Also, Conaree is near the seashore. The fertile lands are in the central area and also on the hillsides of the South East Range mountains.

== Economy ==
Saint Peter's parish's economy is highly industrial. The Canada Estate area is home to the island's quarry site, and many subsidiary industries which manufacture blocks and ready-mixed concrete. Many of the island's trucking and heavy-equipment services are also headquartered there. The parish is also home to the island's waste disposal area, located North of the village of Conaree.

The parish is also home to the island's airport, the larger of the two in the federation. Near the village of Conaree also lies two of the island's best-kept sporting facilities, used for cricket and football.

The Conaree area was once home to many small inns, which hugged Conaree beach, though many have been deserted. It also once housed a gospel radio station but it was moved to Nevis in 1990.

Agriculture dominates the Basseterre Valley, and peasant farmers rear livestock and grow various fruits and vegetables for local consumption on their small holdings.

Tourism is not a particularly key industry in the parish, though it is home to the White House Inn and the ruins of the Château de la Montagne at La Fontaine, once the elaborate and lavish home of St.Kitts' famous former French governor, Phillippe de Longvilliers de Poincy.

== Ports ==
The parish is home to the Robert L. Bradshaw International Airport, which serves the island of Saint Kitts, and is often credited as being the finest mid-sized airport in the Caribbean.

There are no seaports in the parish due to the harsh Atlantic waves along the coast and the many dangerous reef formations.

== Community festivals ==
There is but one community festival: the St. Peter's Fest, which is celebrated in October. Many persons from outlying villages such as Monkey Hill and Ogee's watches the splendour in this riveting festival. This festival features calypso shows, queen shows, parties, street jam sessions and late night limes (hang outs).
