= Saint George Gingerland Parish =

Coordinates: 17°08′N 62°33′W

Saint George Gingerland
- Parish
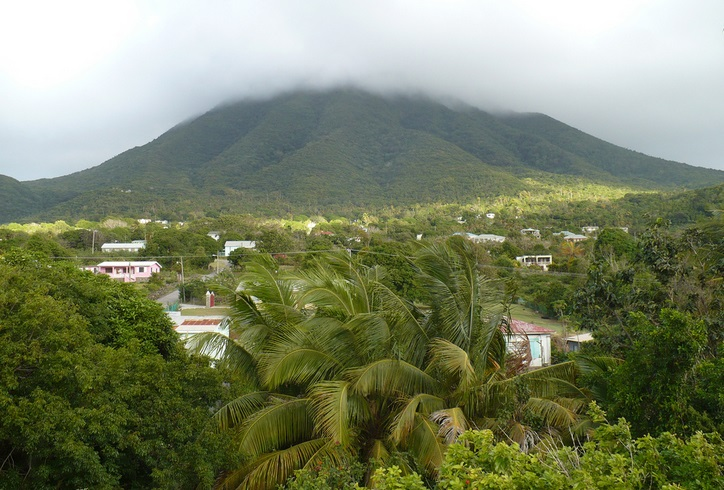
- Nevis peak and Gingerland, from a porch on the Hermitage Hotel

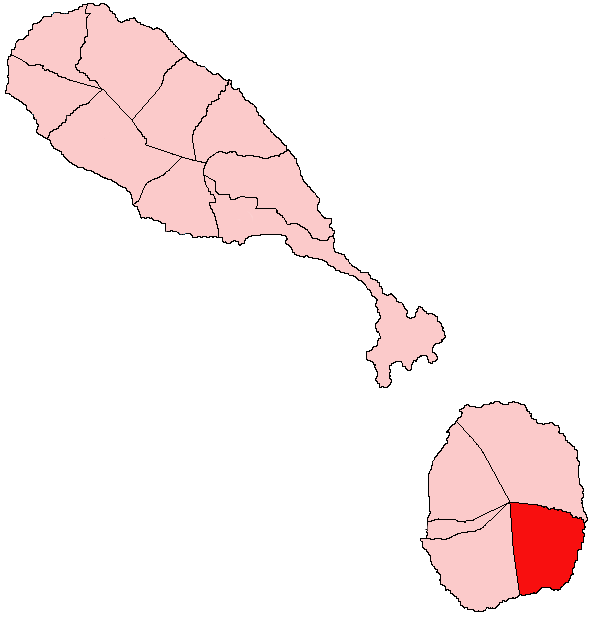
- Country: Saint Kitts and Nevis
- Capital: Market Shop

Area
  - Total: 18 km^{2} (6.9 sq mi)

Population (2011)
  - Total: 2,496
  - Density: 139/km^{2} (360/sq mi)

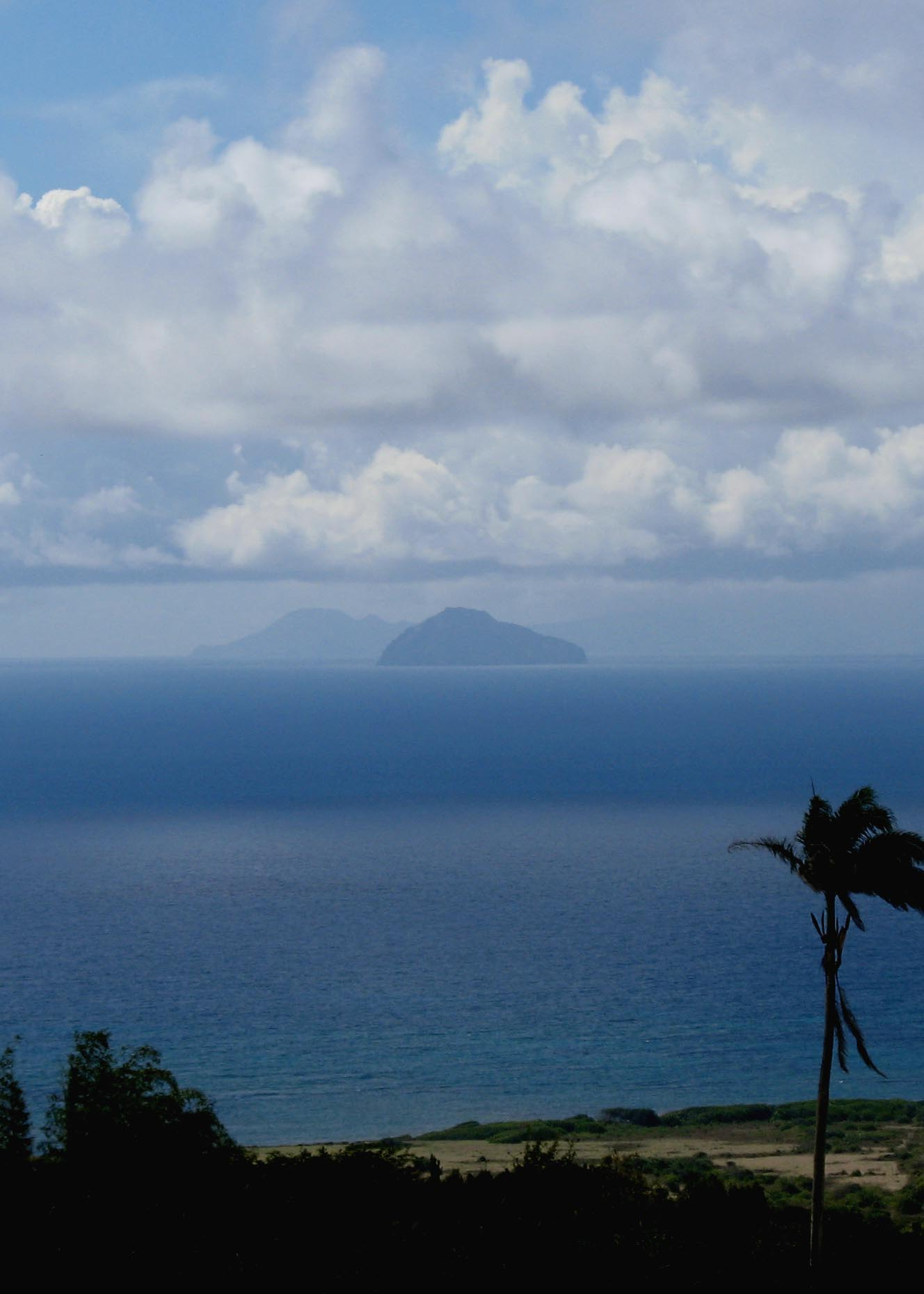
View south from Golden Rock Estate in Gingerland, showing Redonda and Montserrat in the distance

Saint George Gingerland, also known as Marketshop. St George parish in the southeastern part of the island of Nevis, Leeward Islands, West Indies. It is one of five parishes on the island, and has a total population of about 2,500. The five parishes, in combination with the nine parishes of St. Kitts, make up the fourteen administrative parishes of the two-island Federation of Saint Kitts and Nevis.

The parish is commonly referred to as Gingerland, and is named after the valuable ginger crop that used to be grown there. The Anglican parish church of Saint George is located within the main village of Market Shop, and Gingerland also encompasses numerous other villages such as Chicken Stone, Zetlands and Zion. Gingerland is one of the most populous parishes on Nevis, primarily because the higher parts of the parish have fertile soil and good rainfall. The parish is on the windward side of the island (meaning that it faces into the trade winds). Many of the villages in Gingerland are situated at an altitude of nearly 1,000 feet (over 300 meters), making them considerably cooler than coastal villages (especially at night).

Gingerland supplies most of Nevis with fresh fruits and vegetables. The farms are mostly small holdings, where crops are grown for private consumption and for sale. The livestock include sheep and goats, which wander and graze freely; and pigs, cows and horses, which are either fenced or tethered. Feral donkeys roam freely. On the coast around Indian Castle, fishing is important economically.

Tourism is an important industry in Gingerland. The main buildings of hotels such as Old Manor (now closed) and Golden Rock Estate were originally sugarcane plantation "great houses", and some of the other plantation buildings, including the old windmills, have been turned into guest suites or dining areas. A third plantation hotel in the parish is Montpelier Plantation, which is situated not far from the Botanic Garden. The island's racetrack is located in the area near Red Cliff, and the well-attended Nevis horse races take place at approximately monthly intervals.
