= Cayon =

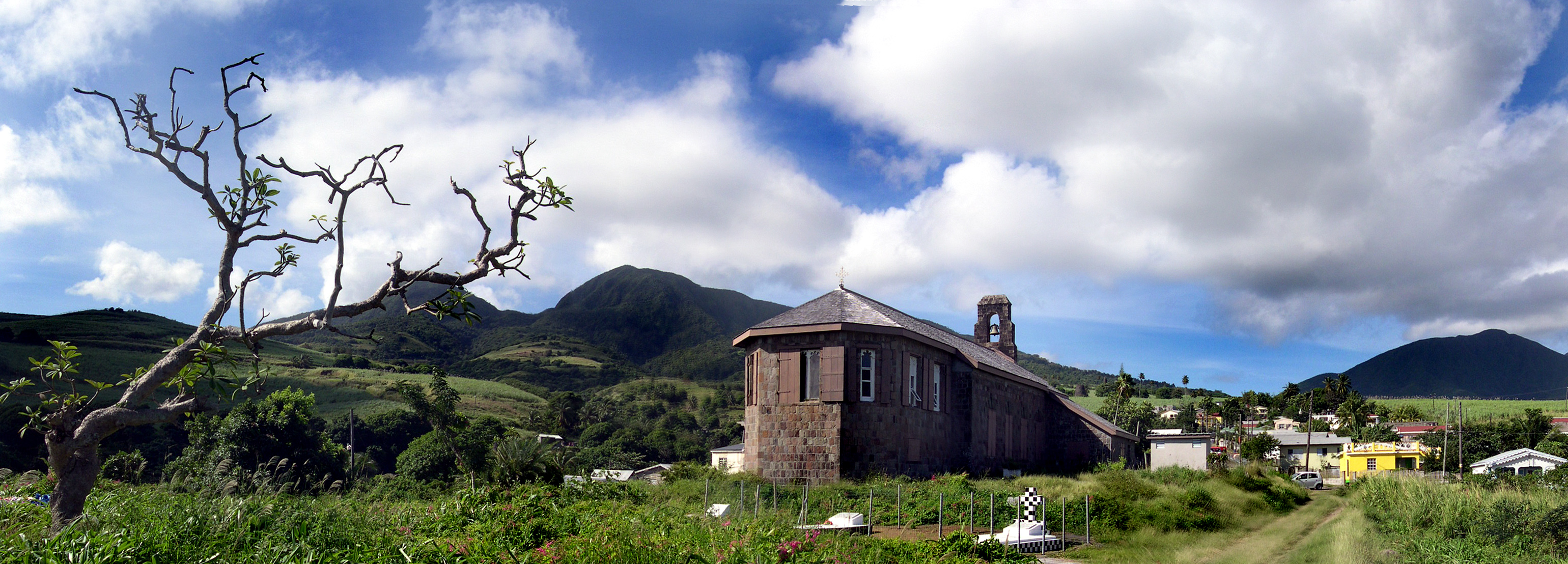
- St. Mary's Church

- Location in Saint Kitts and Nevis
- Coordinates: 17°21′N 062°44′W
- Country: Saint Kitts and Nevis
- Island: Saint Kitts
- Parish: Saint Mary Cayon

Cayon is a town on the northeast coast of Saint Kitts in the Caribbean. It is the capital of Saint Mary Cayon Parish. The estimated population in 2010 was 2,500.

Cayon is home to the campus of Windsor University School of Medicine. St Mary's Park is located in the town and has played host to major cricket matches for the Leeward Islands cricket team.
