= St. Anthony's Peak =

Peak in Saint Kitts and Nevis

Coordinates: 17°14′43″N 62°38′03″W

St. Anthony's Peak is a peak on the island of Saint Kitts in Saint Kitts and Nevis.

It is the highest point on the island's Southeast Peninsula, rising to 319 m (1047 ft) above the Great Salt Pond.

It is a lava dome.

== See also ==
- Geography of Saint Kitts and Nevis
