= Saint George Basseterre Parish =

Coordinates: 17°17′30″N 62°41′30″W

Saint George Basseterre
- Parish
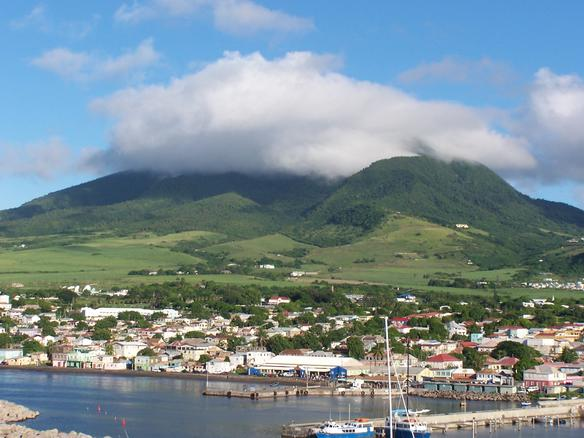
- Basseterre

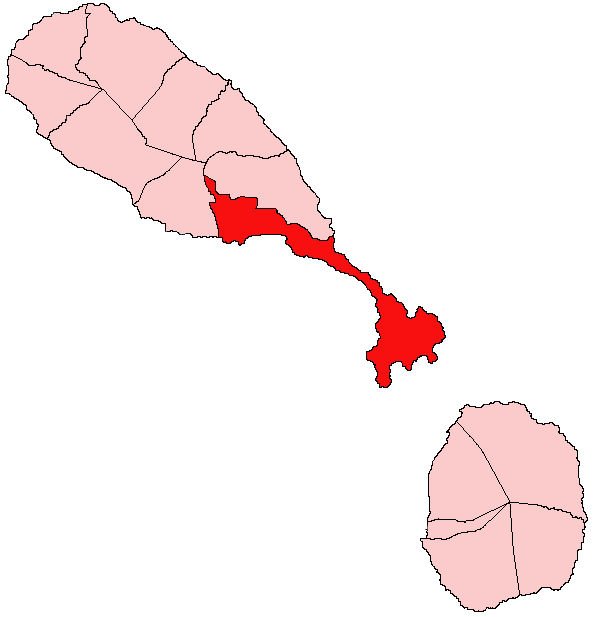
- Country: Saint Kitts and Nevis

Area
  - Total: 29 km^{2} (11 sq mi)

Population (2011)
  - Total: 12,635
  - Density: 436/km^{2} (1,130/sq mi)

Saint George Basseterre is one of 14 administrative parishes that make up Saint Kitts and Nevis. It is the largest parish on Saint Kitts and the second largest parish in Saint Kitts and Nevis (after Saint James Windward). It is by far the most populous parish in the federation, holding nearly a third of the country's population. It is home to the city of Basseterre, capital of Saint Kitts and Nevis, and also has a longer coastline than any other parish in Saint Kitts and Nevis.

== Land ==
The parish's 11 square miles (28 km^{2}) offer the most diverse terrain to be found in a single parish in the country. The northern part of Saint George Basseterre comprises the large Basseterre Valley, one of the most fertile spots on the island. The expansive flatlands are intensively used for agriculture, with the city of Basseterre skirting the coast. The central and southern portions of the parish constitute Saint Kitts' Southeast Peninsula, and has a strikingly contrasting arid climate. It is made up of eroded hills, scrub vegetation, salt ponds and white sand beaches. The largest pond, the Great Salt Pond, covers 3 square miles (7.8 km^{2}). A mile offshore, in the centre of the channel separating Saint Kitts and Nevis lies Booby Island, a rocky island not officially claimed by Saint George Basseterre nor Saint James Windward.

== Cities and towns ==
The capital city of Saint Kitts and Nevis, Basseterre, is located on the coast of Basseterre Bay, but the city also stretches northward into the parish of Saint Peter Basseterre. The location is ideal, as it is the congregation of the island's 4 main thoroughfares (West to Sandy Point, East to Cayon, North to Monkey Hill, and South to the South East Peninsula). The parish's other settlements act as suburbs to the city. Some of the suburbs are Frigate Bay, Mattingley, Bird Rock, Harbour View and New Road. The rich agricultural lands surrounding Basseterre are heavily cultivated, mainly with fruits and vegetables for local consumption as well as for sale to cruise ships and hotels.

Being home to all of St. Kitts' white sand beaches, the South East Peninsula in Saint George Basseterre is the centre for the island's tourism industry. At present, nearly all the tourism development is at the resort town of Frigate Bay, ideally located on a narrow isthmus with 2 fine beaches (one on the Caribbean side and one on the Atlantic side) within 5 minutes walking distance of one another. It is also home to Saint Kitts' championship golf course.

Capital – Basseterre

Other Villages:

- Bird Rock
- Frigate Bay

== Economy ==
Saint George Basseterre is the economic heart of Saint Kitts and Nevis, and is of significant importance to the greater Eastern Caribbean area. Most Kittitians and also many Nevisians work in the city. Basseterre is a regional financial centre, home to the Eastern Caribbean Central Bank Headquarters, as well as the Eastern Caribbean Stock Exchange. It is also home to the Eastern Caribbean's largest light manufacturing industry. The many hotels and resorts in Frigate Bay also are responsible for a lot of the islands' employment and foreign exchange earnings. The parish's former main employer, the sugar factory, officially closed in 2005 following dropping world prices.

== Ports ==
Saint George Basseterre is home to Saint Kitts' 2 seaports of entry, Port Zante and Deep Water Harbour.

== Community festivals ==
Saint George Basseterre is home to three community festivals, Newtown Fest, Gut O'Rama and Village O'Rama. Newtown Fest is held in East Basseterre, mainly centered on the Newtown community, one of the oldest settled wards in the city of Basseterre. Held in mid-September, it features calypso shows, beauty pageants, jam sessions and late night liming sessions. Gut O'Rama is an annual festival held in Central Basseterre, with most activities located in the Westbourne Ghaut area (thus the name). The other community festival in Basseterre is the oldest running and largest (by participant population) community festival in St. Kitts, Village O' Rama. Held in early December, it has the usual festival celebrations (calypso, pageants and jamming), held in 'De Village,' the name given to the collective Western Basseterre communities (because the ward resulted from the overgrowth and amalgamation of several small, separate villages once in the area).

== Future developments ==
The bulk of the Eastern section of the Basseterre Valley (about 2 square miles) is to be developed into a large national park, in attempt to protect the aquifer system beneath it.

Future tourism developments are centred on the Great Salt Pond area in the south. Villa developments are also in the works on various hills and ridges on the peninsula, as well as a dolphin park on South Friar's Bay.

The city of Basseterre was also a venue for the 2007 Cricket World Cup.

== Tourist attractions ==
- National Museum of Saint Kitts
- South Friar's Bay
- Cenotaph
