= Southeast Peninsula =

Southeast Peninsula may refer to:

- Southeast Peninsula, Sulawesi
- Southeast Peninsula (Saint Kitts)
- Mainland Southeast Asia
