= Great Salt Pond =

Saline body of water in Saint Kitts and Nevis

Coordinates: 17°14′30″N 62°38′45″W

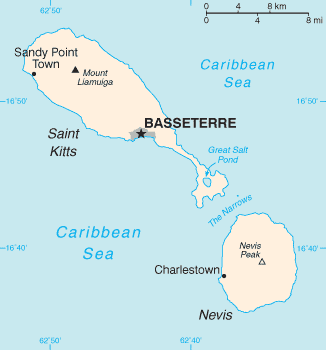
Map of Saint Kitts and Nevis showing the location of the Great Salt Pond

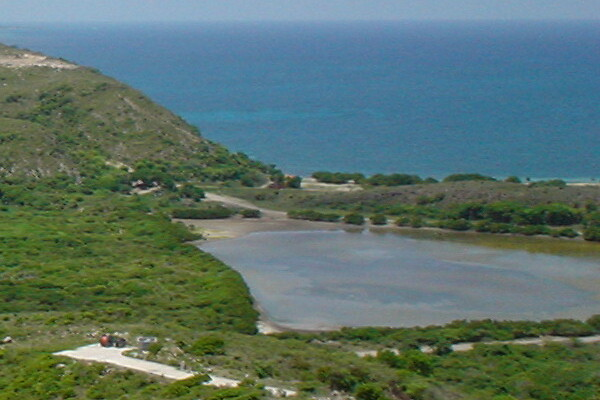
The Great Salt Pond

The Great Salt Pond is a 180-hectare (400-acre) saline body of water in Saint Kitts and Nevis. It's located on the Southeast Peninsula of Saint Kitts, and is by Little Salt Pond to the west. Great Salt Pond and its surroundings have been designated as an Important Bird Area.

== Geography ==
The Great Salt Pond is located on Saint Kitts island, near the point of the Southeast Peninsula and to the north of The Narrows isthmus. There are many saline lakes on the Southeast Peninsula, with the Great Salt Pond being the largest of them, and the largest lake in all of Saint Kitts and Nevis; however, it has been connected with Little Salt Pond, to the west, which in turn has been connected to the Caribbean Sea, turning the lake into a bay.

== Ecology ==
The area that the Great Salt Pond is located in has dry shrubbery consisting mainly of succulents, and in addition to this it has patches of mangroves growing nearby. Great Salt Pond and its surroundings are an Important Bird Area, being home to a variety of species, including common gallinules, ground doves and snipes, great blue and yellow-crowned night herons, snowy plovers and Wilson's plovers, greater and lesser yellowlegs, solitary, semipalmated, western, least and stilt sandpipers, black-necked stilts, long-billed dowitchers, yellow-billed cuckoos, northern waterthrushes, Antillean crested hummingbirds, Caribbean martins, willets, dunlins and bobolinks. The number of birds present during breeding seasons are subject to significant fluctuations.

== See also ==
- Geography of Saint Kitts and Nevis
