= Saint Kitts and Nevis =

Country in the West Indies

Federation of Saint Kitts and Nevis
- Flag Coat of arms
- Motto: "Country Above Self"
- Anthem: "O Land of Beauty!" Royal anthem: "God Save the King"
- Capital and largest city: Basseterre; 17°18′N 62°44′W
- Official languages: English
- Vernacular language: Saint Kitts Creole
- Ethnic groups (2020): 95.5% Afro-Caribbean; 3.0% Mixed; 2.1% European; 1.6% Indian; 0.5% other; 0.3% unspecified
- Religion (2020): 94.6% Christianity; 81.3% Protestantism; 13.3% other Christian; 2.6% no religion; 1.5% Hinduism; 1.3% other
- Demonyms: Kittitian; Nevisian
- Government: Federal parliamentary constitutional monarchy
  - Monarch: Charles III
  - Governor-General: Dame Marcella Liburd
  - Prime Minister: Terrance Drew
- Legislature: National Assembly

Independence from the United Kingdom
  - Associated State: 27 February 1967
  - Independence declared: 19 September 1983

Area
  - Total: 261 km^{2} (101 sq mi) (188th)
  - Water (%): Negligible

Population
  - 2023 census: 54,338 (187th)
  - Density: 164/km^{2} (424.8/sq mi) (64th)
- GDP (PPP): 2023 estimate
  - Total: ▲$1.8 billion
  - Per capita: ▲$29,893
- GDP (nominal): 2023 estimate
  - Total: ▲$1 billion
  - Per capita: ▲$18,158
- HDI (2023): ▲0.840 very high (58th)
- Currency: East Caribbean dollar (EC$) (XCD)
- Time zone: UTC-4 (AST)
- Date format: dd-mm-yyyy
- Calling code: +1
- ISO 3166 code: KN
- Internet TLD: .kn
- 1. Or "Saint Kitts and Nevis".

Saint Kitts and Nevis (Note: /-ˈkɪts ... ˈniːvɪs/) (SKN), officially the Federation of Saint Kitts and Nevis, (Note: The constitution states that the island of Saint Christopher (which is otherwise known as Saint Kitts) and the island of Nevis shall be a sovereign democratic federal state which may be styled Saint Christopher and Nevis or Saint Kitts and Nevis or the Federation of Saint Christopher and Nevis.) is an island country located in the Caribbean consisting of the two islands of Saint Kitts and Nevis, in the Leeward Islands chain of the Lesser Antilles. With 261 square kilometres (101 sq mi) of territory, and roughly 48,000 inhabitants, it is the smallest sovereign state in the Western Hemisphere, in both area and population, as well as the world's smallest sovereign Federation. The country is a Commonwealth realm, with Charles III as king and head of state.

The capital city is Basseterre, located on the larger island of Saint Kitts. Basseterre is also the main port for passenger entry (via cruise ships) and cargo. The smaller island of Nevis lies approximately 3 km (1.6 nmi; 1.9 mi) to the southeast of Saint Kitts, across a shallow channel called the Narrows.

The British dependency of Anguilla was historically also a part of this union, which was known collectively as Saint Christopher-Nevis-Anguilla. However, Anguilla chose to secede from the union in 1967, and remains a British overseas territory.

Saint Kitts and Nevis were among the first islands in the Caribbean to be colonised by Europeans. Saint Kitts was home to the first British and French Caribbean colonies, and thus has also been titled "The Mother Colony of the West Indies". It is also the most recent British territory in the Caribbean to become independent, gaining independence in 1983. Before independence, the federation became an associated state of the United Kingdom with full internal self-government in 1964.

== Etymology ==
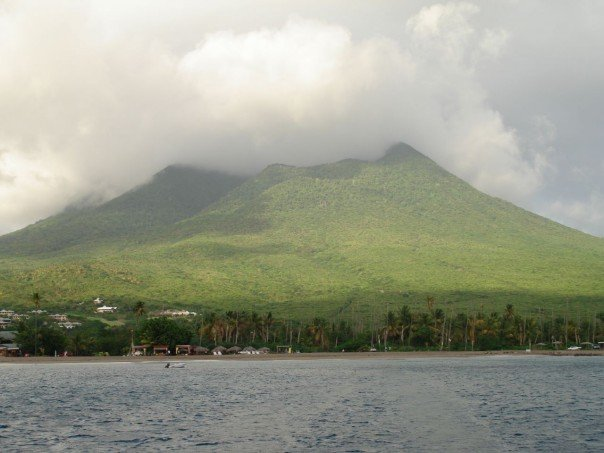
Clouds covering Nevis Peak

The Kalinago, the pre-European inhabitants of Saint Kitts, called the island Liamuiga, roughly translating as 'fertile land'.

It is thought that Christopher Columbus, the first European to see the islands in 1493, named the larger island San Cristóbal, after Saint Christopher, his patron saint and that of travellers. New studies suggest that Columbus named the island Sant Yago (Saint James), and that the name San Cristóbal was in fact given by Columbus to the island now known as Saba, 32 km (20 mi) northwest. Saint Kitts was well documented as San Cristóbal by the 17th century. The first English colonists kept the English translation of this name, and dubbed it St. Christopher's Island. In the 17th century, a common nickname for Christopher was Kit; in consequence, the island came to be informally referred to as Saint Kitt's Island, later further shortened to Saint Kitts.

Columbus gave Nevis the name San Martín (Saint Martin). The current name Nevis is derived from the Spanish Nuestra Señora de las Nieves, meaning "Our Lady of the Snows", a reference to the 4th-century Catholic miracle of a summertime snowfall on the Esquiline Hill in Rome. It is not known who chose this name for the island, but it is thought that white clouds which usually wreathe the top of Nevis Peak reminded someone of the miracle.

Today, the Constitution refers to the state as both Saint Kitts and Nevis and Saint Christopher and Nevis; the former is the one most commonly used, but the latter is generally used for laws and diplomatic relations. Passports list the nationality of citizens as St. Kitts and Nevis. The Citizenship Act also uses the official name "Saint Christopher and Nevis".

== History ==
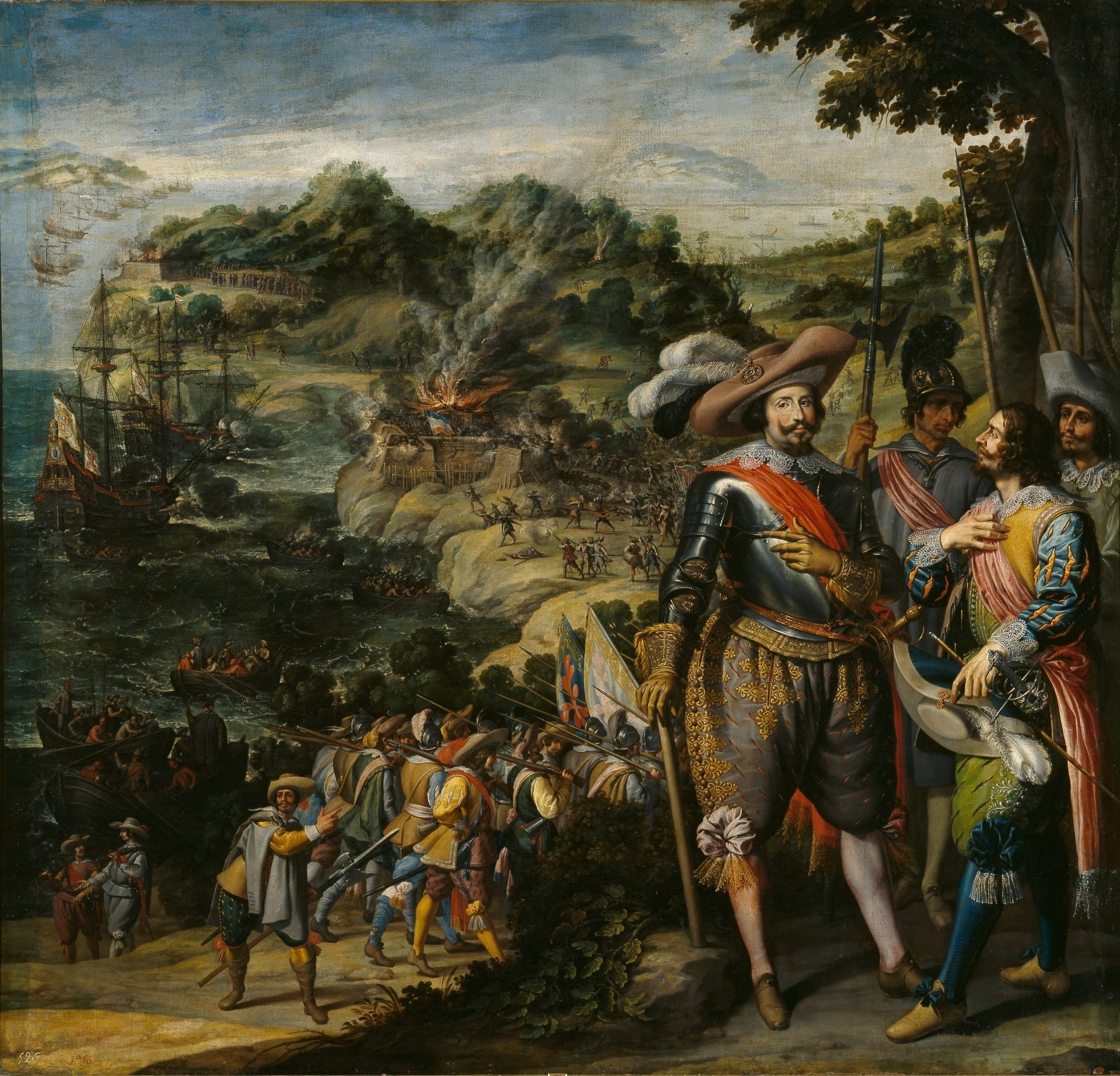
The Spanish capture of Saint Kitts in 1629 by Fadrique de Toledo, 1st Marquis of Villanueva de Valdueza

=== Pre-colonial period ===
The earliest known inhabitants of Saint Kitts and Nevis were pre-ceramic, pre-agricultural people who arrived as early as 3000 BCE. These groups, often referred to as "Archaic people", were hunter-gatherers who migrated down the archipelago from Florida. Due to the absence of pottery and other durable artifacts, their cultural affiliations remain uncertain. Around 100 BCE, the islands saw the arrival of the Saladoid people, a ceramic-using, agricultural society that migrated northward from the Orinoco River region in present-day Venezuela. They introduced agriculture and pottery to the islands and established settled communities.

By approximately 800 CE, the Igneri people, associated with the Arawak linguistic group, had settled on the islands. The Igneri were known for their peaceful nature and religious practices, and they continued the agricultural traditions of their predecessors.

Around 1300 CE, the Kalinago people, also known as the Island Caribs, migrated to Saint Kitts and Nevis. Renowned for their seafaring skills and warrior culture, the Kalinago displaced the Igneri and established dominance over the islands. They named Saint Kitts "Liamuiga", meaning "fertile land", and Nevis "Oualie", meaning "land of beautiful waters".

=== European arrival and early colonial period (1493–1700) ===
Christopher Columbus was the first European to sight the islands in 1493. The first permanent European settlers were the English in 1623, led by Thomas Warner, who established a settlement at Old Road Town on the west coast of St Kitts after achieving an agreement with the Carib chief Ouboutou Tegremante. The French later also settled on St Kitts in 1625 under Pierre Belain d'Esnambuc. As a result, both parties agreed to partition the island into French and English sectors. From 1628 onward the English also began settling on Nevis.

The French and English, intent on exploitation of the island's resources, encountered resistance from the Kalinago, who waged war during the first three years of the settlements' existence. The Europeans resolved to rid themselves of this problem. An ideological campaign was waged by colonial chroniclers, dating back to the Spanish, as they produced literature which denied the Kalinagos' humanity (a literary tradition carried through the late-seventeenth century by such authors as Jean-Baptiste du Tertre and Pere Labat). In 1626 the Anglo-French settlers joined forces to massacre the Kalinago at a place that became known as Bloody Point, allegedly to preempt a Carib plan to expel or kill all European settlers. Thereafter, the English and French established large sugar plantations which were worked by imported African slaves. This made the planter-colonists rich, but drastically altered the islands' demographics as black slaves soon came to outnumber Europeans.

A Spanish expedition of 1629 sent to enforce Spanish claims destroyed the English and French colonies and deported the settlers back to their respective countries. As part of the war settlement in 1630, the Spanish permitted the re-establishment of the English and French colonies. Spain later formally recognised Britain's claim to St Kitts with the Treaty of Madrid (1670), in return for British cooperation in the fight against piracy.

As Spanish power declined, Saint Kitts became a key base for English and French expansion in the Caribbean. From St Kitts the British settled the islands of Antigua, Montserrat, Anguilla and Tortola, and the French settled Martinique, the Guadeloupe archipelago and Saint Barthélemy. During the late 17th century, France and England fought for control over St Kitts and Nevis, fighting wars in 1667, 1689–90 and 1701–13. The French renounced their claim to the islands with the Treaty of Utrecht in 1713. The islands' economy, already shattered by war, was further harmed by natural disasters: In 1690 an earthquake destroyed Jamestown, capital of Nevis, forcing the construction of a new capital at Charlestown. Further damage was caused by a hurricane in 1707.

=== British colonial period (1700–1983) ===
The colony had recovered by the turn of the 18th century, and St Kitts had become the richest British Crown Colony per capita in the Caribbean as result of its slave-based sugar industry by the close of the 1700s. The 18th century also saw Nevis, formerly the richer of the two islands, being eclipsed by St Kitts in economic importance. Alexander Hamilton, the future U.S. secretary of the Treasury, was born on Nevis in 1755 or 1757.

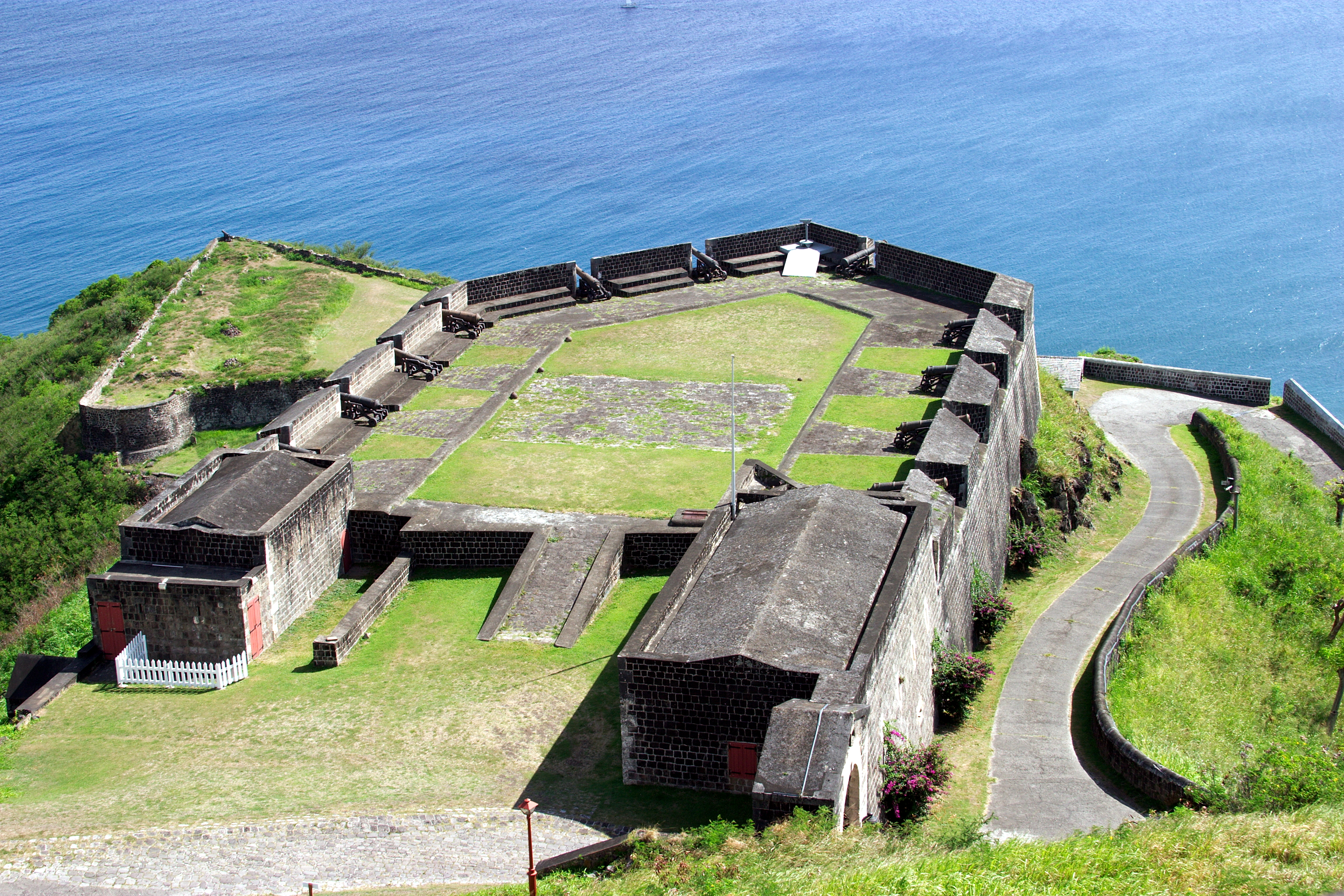
The fortress on Brimstone Hill, focus of the successful French invasion of 1782

As Britain became embroiled in war with its American colonies, the French decided to use the opportunity to re-capture St Kitts in 1782; however St Kitts was given back and recognised as British territory in the Treaty of Versailles (1783).

The African slave trade was terminated within the British Empire in 1807, and slavery outlawed completely in 1834. A four-year "apprenticeship" period followed for each slave, in which they worked for their former owners for wages. On Nevis 8,815 slaves were freed, while St Kitts freed 19,780.

Saint Kitts and Nevis, along with Anguilla, were federated in 1882. In the first few decades of the 20th century economic hardship and lack of opportunities led to the growth of a labour movement; the Great Depression prompted sugar workers to go on strike in 1935. The 1940s saw the founding of the St Kitts-Nevis-Anguilla Labour Party (later renamed the Saint Kitts and Nevis Labour Party, or SKNLP) under Robert Llewellyn Bradshaw. Bradshaw later became Chief Minister and then Premier of the colony from 1966 to 1978; he sought to gradually bring the sugar-based economy under greater state control. The more conservative-leaning People's Action Movement party (PAM) was founded in 1965.

After a brief period as part of the West Indies Federation (1958–1962), the islands became an associated state with full internal autonomy in 1967. Residents of Nevis and Anguilla were unhappy with St Kitts's domination of the federation, and Anguilla unilaterally declared independence in 1967. In 1971 Britain resumed full control of Anguilla, but it was formally separated in 1980. Attention then focused on Nevis, with the Nevis Reformation Party seeking to safeguard the smaller island's interests in any future independent state. Eventually it was agreed that the island would have a degree of autonomy with its own Premier and Assembly, as well as the constitutionally-protected right to unilaterally secede if a referendum on independence resulted in a two-thirds majority in favour.

=== Post independence era (1983–present) ===
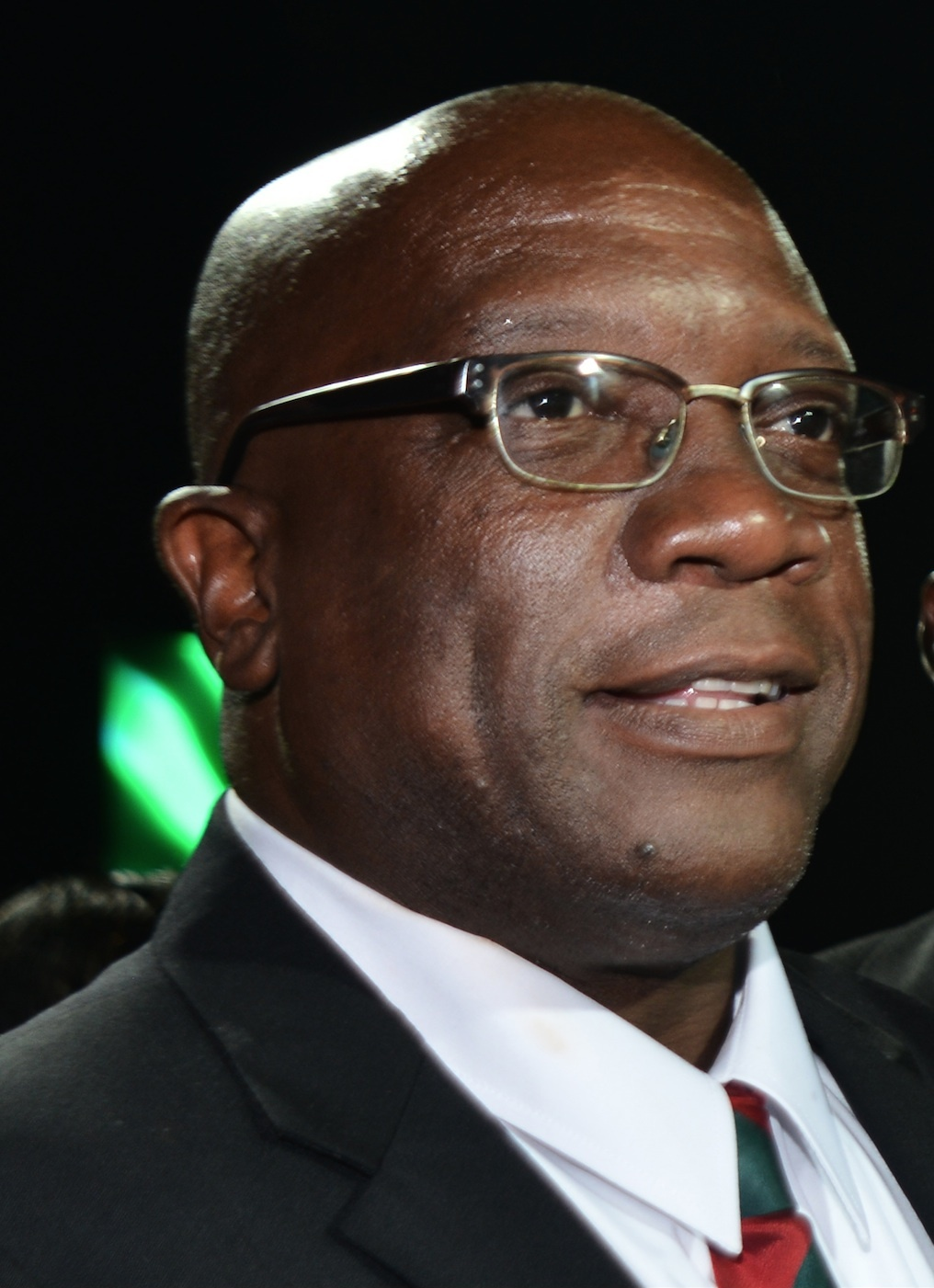
Timothy Harris, Prime Minister 2015–2022

St Kitts and Nevis achieved full independence on 19 September 1983. Kennedy Simmonds of the PAM, Premier since 1980, duly became the country's first Prime Minister. St Kitts and Nevis opted to remain within the British Commonwealth, at that time retaining Queen Elizabeth as Monarch, represented locally by a Governor-General. Kennedy Simmonds went on to win elections in 1984, 1989 and 1993, before being unseated when the SKNLP returned to power in 1995 under Denzil Douglas.

In Nevis, growing discontent with their perceived marginalisation within the federation led to a referendum to separate from St Kitts in 1998, which though resulting a 62% vote to secede, fell short of the required two-thirds majority to be legally enacted.

In late-September 1998, Hurricane Georges caused approximately $458,000,000 in damage and limited GDP growth for the year and beyond. Meanwhile, the sugar industry, in decline for years and propped up only by government subsidies, was closed completely in 2005.

The 2015 Saint Kitts and Nevis general election was won by Timothy Harris and his recently formed People's Labour Party, with backing from the PAM and the Nevis-based Concerned Citizens' Movement under the 'Team Unity' banner.

In June 2020, Team Unity coalition of the incumbent government, led by Prime Minister Timothy Harris, won general elections by defeating Saint Kitts and Nevis Labour Party (SKNLP).

In snap general elections held in August 2022, the SKNLP again won, and Terrance Drew became the fourth prime minister of Saint Kitts and Nevis.

== Geography ==
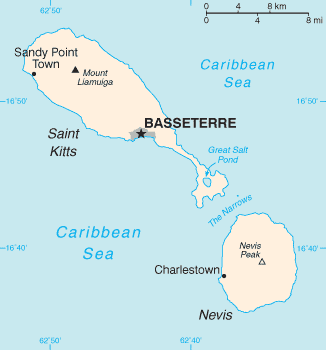
A map of Saint Kitts and Nevis

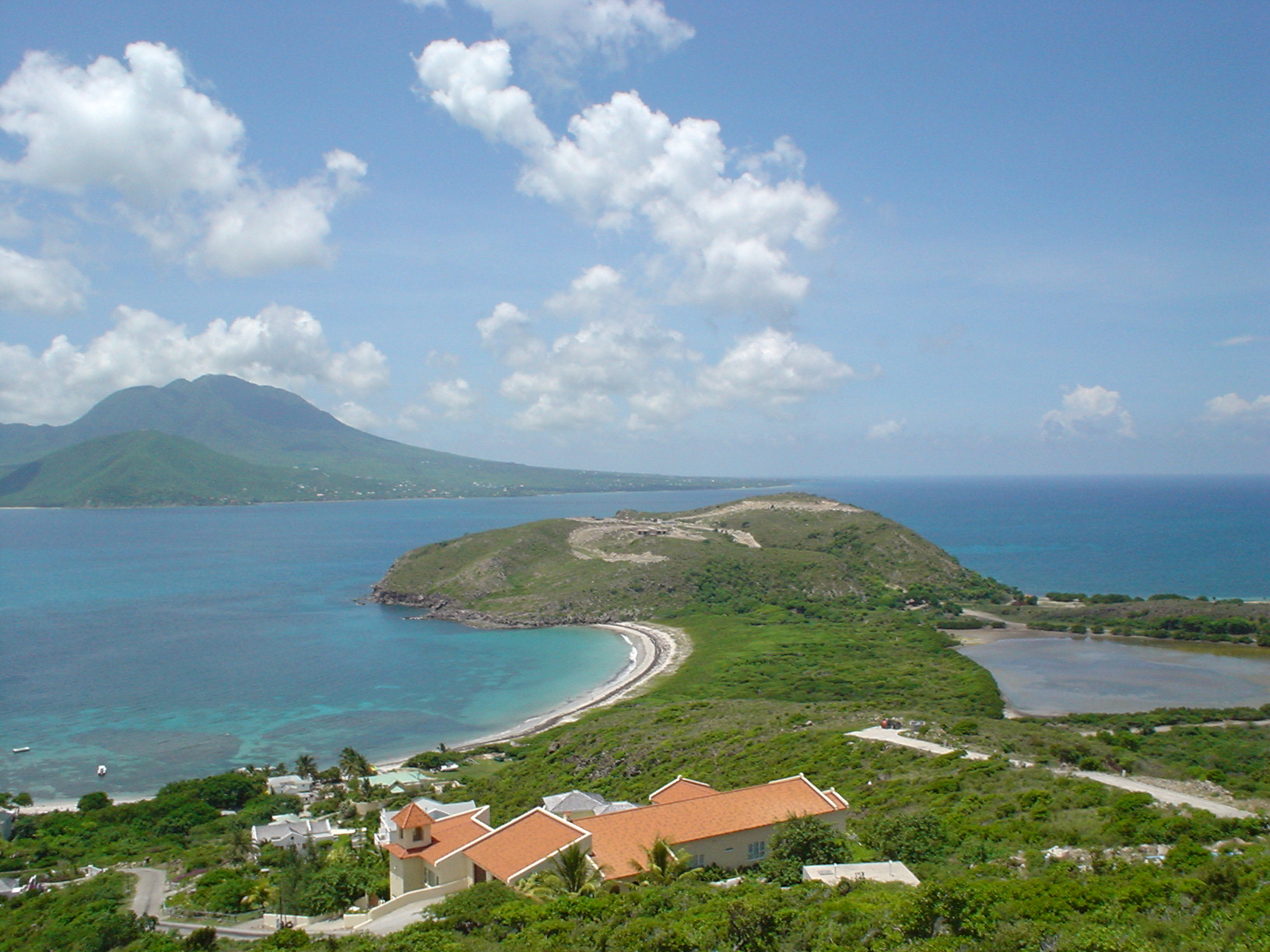
A view of Nevis island from the southeastern peninsula of Saint Kitts

The country consists of two main islands, Saint Kitts and Nevis, separated at a distance of 2 miles (3 km) by a shallow channel called The Narrows.

The capital city is Basseterre, located on the larger island of Saint Kitts. Basseterre is also the main port for passenger entry (via cruise ships) and cargo.

Both main islands are of volcanic origin, with large central peaks covered in tropical rainforest. The majority of the population live along the flatter coastal areas. St Kitts contains several mountain ranges (the North West Range, Central Range and South-West Range) in its centre, where the highest peak of the country, Mount Liamuiga 1,156 metres (3,793 ft) can be found. Along the east coast can be found the Canada Hills and Conaree Hills. The land narrows considerably in the south-east, forming a much flatter peninsula which contains the largest body of water, the Great Salt Pond. To the southeast, in The Narrows, lies the small isle of Booby Island. There are numerous rivers descending from the mountains of both islands, which provide fresh water to the local population. Nevis, the smaller of the two main islands and roughly circular in shape, is dominated by Nevis Peak 985 metres (3,232 ft).

Saint Kitts and Nevis contains two terrestrial ecoregions: Leeward Islands moist forests and Leeward Islands dry forests. The country had a 2019 Forest Landscape Integrity Index mean score of 4.55/10, ranking it 121st globally out of 172 countries.

=== Neighbouring islands ===
The islands of Sint Eustatius, Saba, Saint Barthélemy, Saint-Martin/Sint Maarten and Anguilla lie to the north-northwest of the country. To the east and northeast are Antigua and Barbuda, and to the southeast is the small uninhabited island of Redonda (part of Antigua and Barbuda) and the island of Montserrat.

=== Flora and fauna ===
The national flower is Delonix regia. Common plants include palmetto, hibiscus, bougainvillea, and tamarind. Pinus species are common in the dense forests of islands, and are usually covered by various species of ferns.

The national bird is the brown pelican. 176 species of bird have been reported from the country.

=== Climate ===
By the Köppen climate classification, St Kitts has a tropical savanna climate (Köppen Aw) and Nevis has a tropical monsoon climate (Köppen Am). Mean monthly temperatures in Basseterre varies little from 23.9 °C (75.0 °F) to 26.6 °C (79.9 °F). Yearly rainfall is approximately 2,400 millimetres (90 in), although it has varied from 1,356 millimetres (53.4 in) to 3,183 millimetres (125.3 in) in the period 1901–2015.

Climate data for Saint Kitts and Nevis (1991–2015)
Month	Jan	Feb	Mar	Apr	May	Jun	Jul	Aug	Sep	Oct	Nov	Dec	Year
Daily mean °C (°F)	23.9 (75.0)	23.8 (74.8)	24.0 (75.2)	24.7 (76.5)	25.5 (77.9)	26.2 (79.2)	26.3 (79.3)	26.6 (79.9)	26.4 (79.5)	26.0 (78.8)	25.4 (77.7)	24.4 (75.9)	25.3 (77.5)
Average precipitation mm (inches)	150 (5.9)	102 (4.0)	99 (3.9)	153 (6.0)	219 (8.6)	181 (7.1)	214 (8.4)	232 (9.1)	222 (8.7)	289 (11.4)	286 (11.3)	225 (8.9)	2,372 (93.3)
Source: Climate Change Knowledge Portal

=== National parks ===
There are two national parks: Brimstone Hill Fortress National Park and Central Forest Reserve National Park. Brimstone Hill Fortress was officially designated a National Park in 1985, and it was declared a UNESCO World Heritage Site in 1999. Central Forest Reserve was designated a National Park by the government on 23 October 2006, and officially gazetted on 29 March 2007.

== Government and politics ==
Charles III
King of Saint Kitts and Nevis

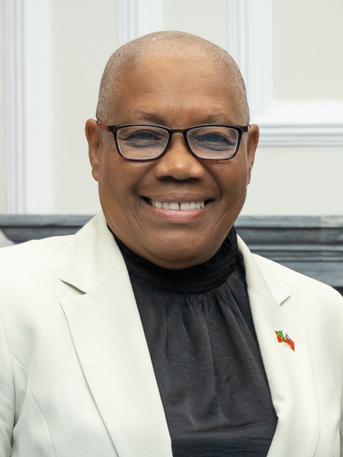
Marcella Liburd
Governor-General of Saint Kitts and Nevis

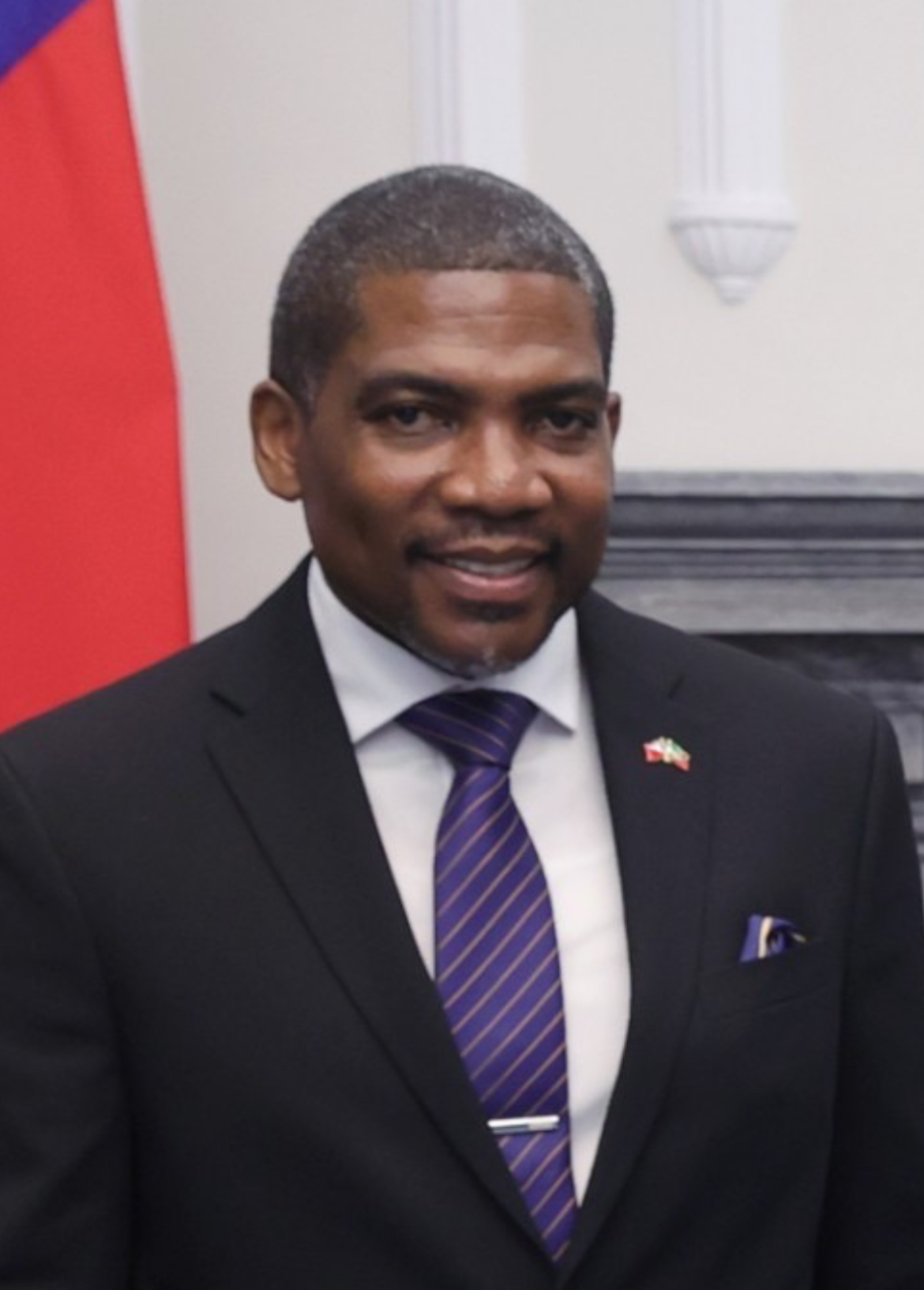
Terrance Drew
Prime Minister of Saint Kitts and Nevis

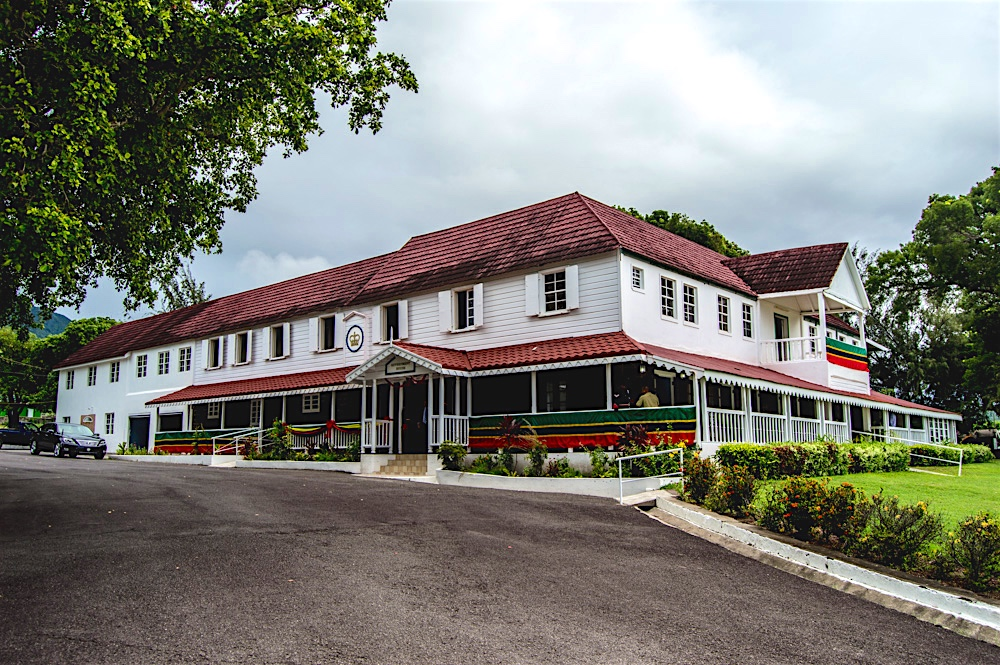
Government House, Basseterre, is the official residence of the Governor-General of Saint Kitts and Nevis.

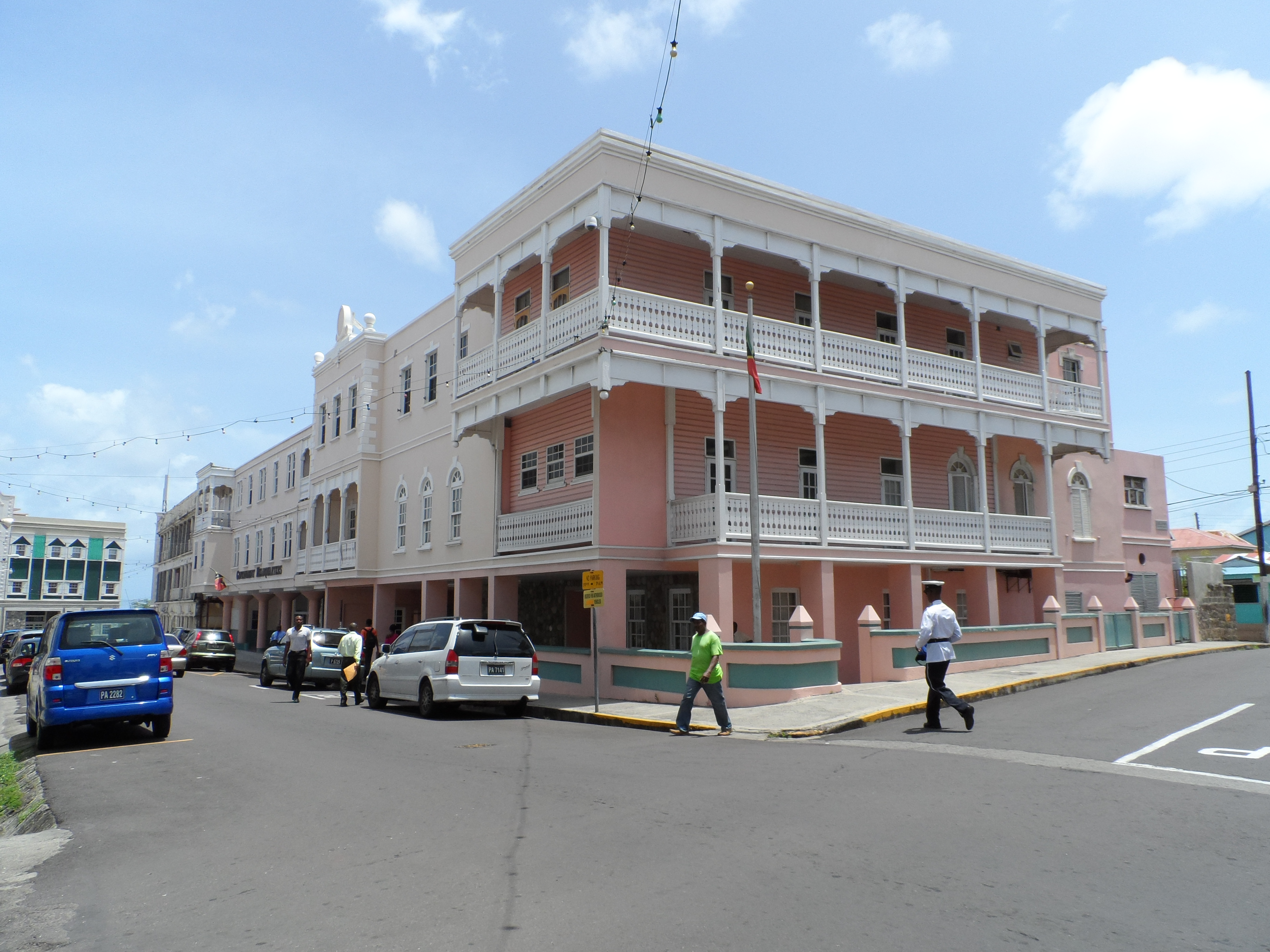
Government headquarters of Saint Kitts and Nevis

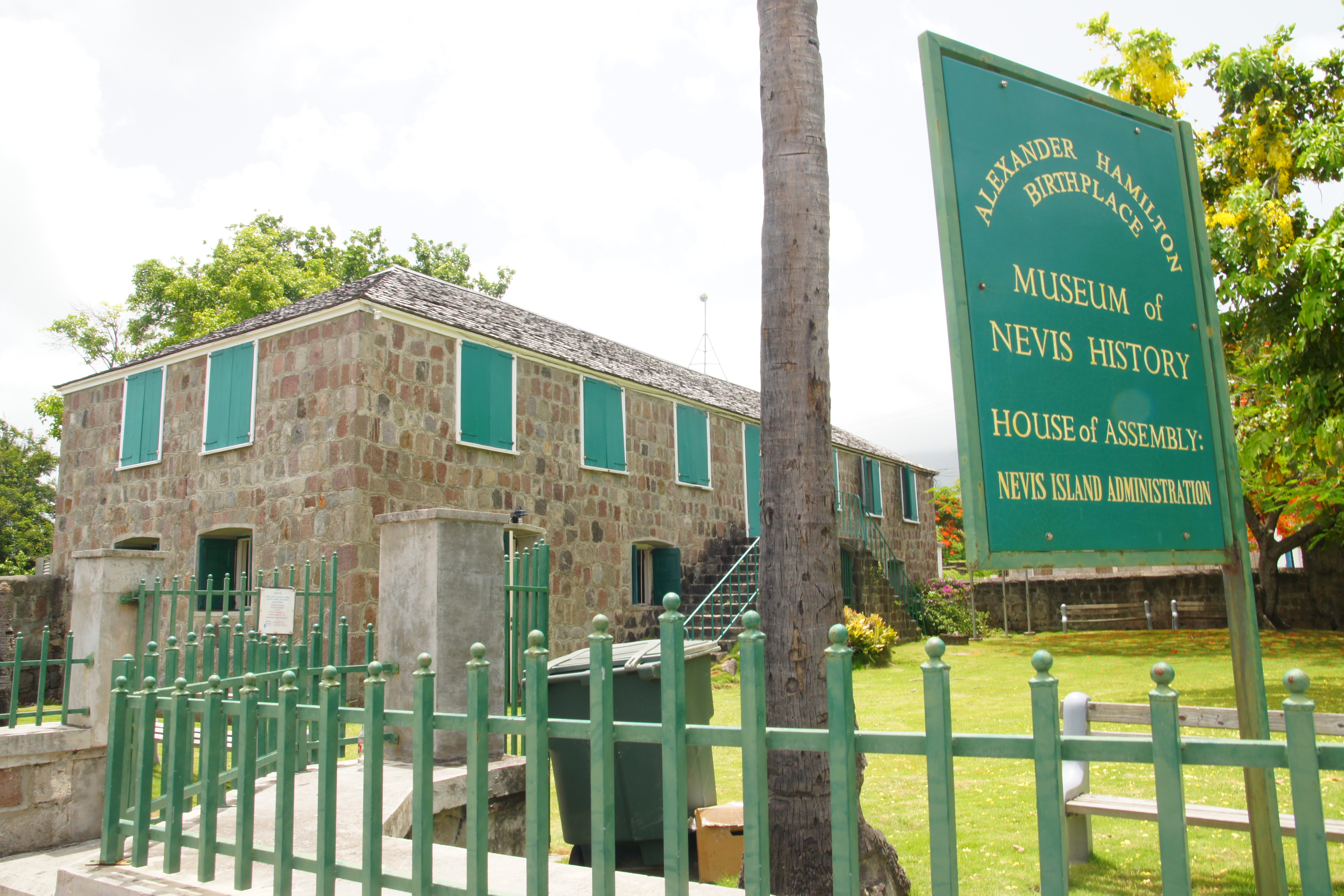
The Nevis Island Assembly

Saint Kitts and Nevis is a sovereign, democratic, and federal state. It is a Commonwealth realm, a constitutional monarchy with the king of Saint Christopher and Nevis, Charles III, as its head of state. The King is represented in the country by a Governor-General, who acts on the advice of the prime minister and the Cabinet. The Prime Minister is the leader of the majority party of the House, and the cabinet conducts affairs of state.

St. Kitts and Nevis has a unicameral legislature, known as the National Assembly. It is composed of fourteen members: eleven elected representatives (three from the island of Nevis) and three senators, who are appointed by the Governor-General. Two of the senators are appointed on the advice of the Prime Minister, and one, on the advice of the leader of the opposition. Unlike in other countries, the senators do not constitute a separate senate or upper house of parliament, but sit in the National Assembly alongside representatives. All members serve five-year terms. The Prime Minister and the Cabinet answer to the Parliament. Nevis also maintains its own semi-autonomous assembly.

=== Administrative divisions ===
The federation of Saint Kitts and Nevis is divided into fourteen parishes, nine of them on Saint Kitts and five on Nevis.

Parishes of Saint Kitts and Nevis
Name	Capital	Area (km^{2})	Population				Population density per km^{2} (2022)
Name	Capital	Area (km^{2})	2022	2011	2001	1991	Population density per km^{2} (2022)
Christ Church Nichola Town	Nichola Town	17.97	2,064	1,922	2,061	1,664	114.9
Saint Anne Sandy Point	Sandy Point Town	12.74	2,969	2,626	3,167	3,077	233.0
Saint George Basseterre	Basseterre	28.60	13,652	12,635	13,251	12,605	477.3
Saint John Capisterre	Dieppe Bay Town	24.25	2,972	2,962	3,248	2,936	122.6
Saint Mary Cayon	Cayon	14.72	3,341	3,435	3,423	3,249	227.0
Saint Paul Capisterre	Saint Paul Capisterre	12.66	2,468	2,432	2,453	2,130	194.9
Saint Peter Basseterre	Monkey Hill	19.74	5,667	4,670	3,541	2,656	287.1
Saint Thomas Middle Island	Middle Island	23.55	2,657	2,535	2,395	2,257	112.8
Trinity Palmetto Point	Trinity	14.69	2,348	1,701	1,678	1,250	159.8
Saint Kitts	Basseterre	168.92	38,138	34,918	35,217	31,824	225.8
Saint George Gingerland	Market Shop	18.7	2,323	2,496	2,564	2,086	124.2
Saint James Windward	Newcastle	31.5	2,290	2,038	1,806	1,493	72.7
Saint John Figtree	Figtree	21.7	4,416	3,827	2,901	2,191	203.5
Saint Paul Charlestown	Charlestown	3.6	1,888	1,847	1,790	1,411	524.4
Saint Thomas Lowland	Cotton Ground	18.2	2,265	2,069	2,047	1,613	124.5
Nevis	Charlestown	93.7	13,182	12,277	11,108	8,794	140.7
Saint Kitts and Nevis total	Basseterre	262.62	51,320	47,195	46,325	40,618	195.4

=== Foreign relations ===
Saint Kitts and Nevis has no major international disputes. Saint Kitts and Nevis is a full and participating member of the Caribbean Community (CARICOM), the Organisation of Eastern Caribbean States (OECS), and the Organisation of American States (OAS).

St Kitts & Nevis entered the OAS system on 16 September 1984.

==== Agreements which impact on financial relationships ====
===== Double Taxation Relief (CARICOM) Treaty 1994 =====
At a CARICOM meeting, representative of St. Kitts and Nevis Kennedy Simmonds signed the Double Taxation Relief (CARICOM) Treaty 1994, on 6 July 1994.

The representatives of seven CARICOM countries signed similar agreements at Sherbourne Conference Centre, St. Michael, Barbados. The countries whose representatives signed the treaties in Barbados were: Antigua & Barbuda, Belize, Grenada, Jamaica, St. Lucia, St. Vincent & the Grenadines and Trinidad and Tobago. This treaty covered income, residence, tax jurisdictions, capital gains, business profits, interest, dividends, royalties and other areas.

===== FATCA =====
On 30 June 2014, St. Kitts and Nevis signed a Model 1 agreement with the United States of America in relation to Foreign Account Tax Compliance Act (FATCA). The agreement entered into force on 31 August 2015.

=== Military ===
Saint Kitts and Nevis has a defence force of 300 personnel. It is mostly involved in policing and drug trade interception.

=== Human rights ===
Male homosexuality has been legal in St. Kitts and Nevis since 29 August 2022. In 2011, the Government of St. Kitts and Nevis said it had "no mandate from the people" to abolish the criminalisation of homosexuality among consenting adults.

== Economy ==
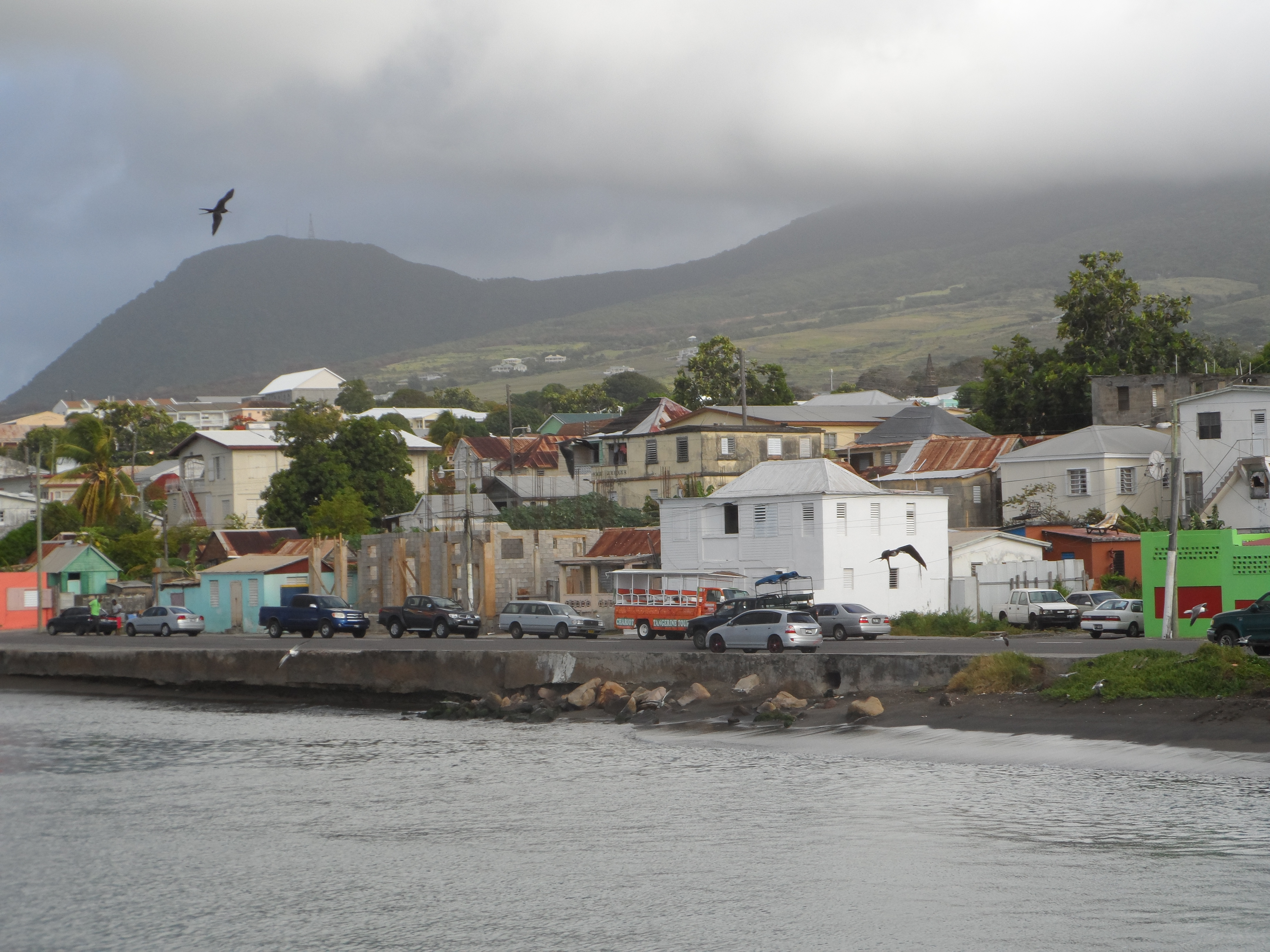
The capital, Basseterre

Saint Kitts and Nevis is a twin-island federation whose economy is characterised by its dominant tourism, agriculture, and light manufacturing industries. Sugar was the primary export from the 1940s on, but rising production costs, low world market prices, and the government's efforts to reduce dependence on it have led to a growing diversification of the agricultural sector. In 2005, the government decided to close down the state-owned sugar company, which had experienced losses and was a significant contributor to the fiscal deficit. In the 21st century, the government has sought to diversify the economy via agriculture, tourism, export-oriented manufacturing, and offshore banking.

In July 2015, St Kitts & Nevis and the Republic of Ireland signed a tax agreement to "promote international co-operation in tax matters through exchange of information." The agreement was developed by the OECD Global Forum Working Group on Effective Exchange of Information, which consisted of representatives from OECD member countries and 11 other countries in the Caribbean and other parts of the world.

=== Tourism ===
Tourist arrivals of 2024 in %

St Kitts and Nevis is heavily dependent upon tourism to drive its economy, a sector which has expanded significantly since the 1970s. In 2009 there were 587,479 arrivals to Saint Kitts compared to 379,473 in 2007, an increase of just under 40% in a two-year period; however, the tourist sector declined during the Great Recession and then rebounded slowly.

=== Transport ===
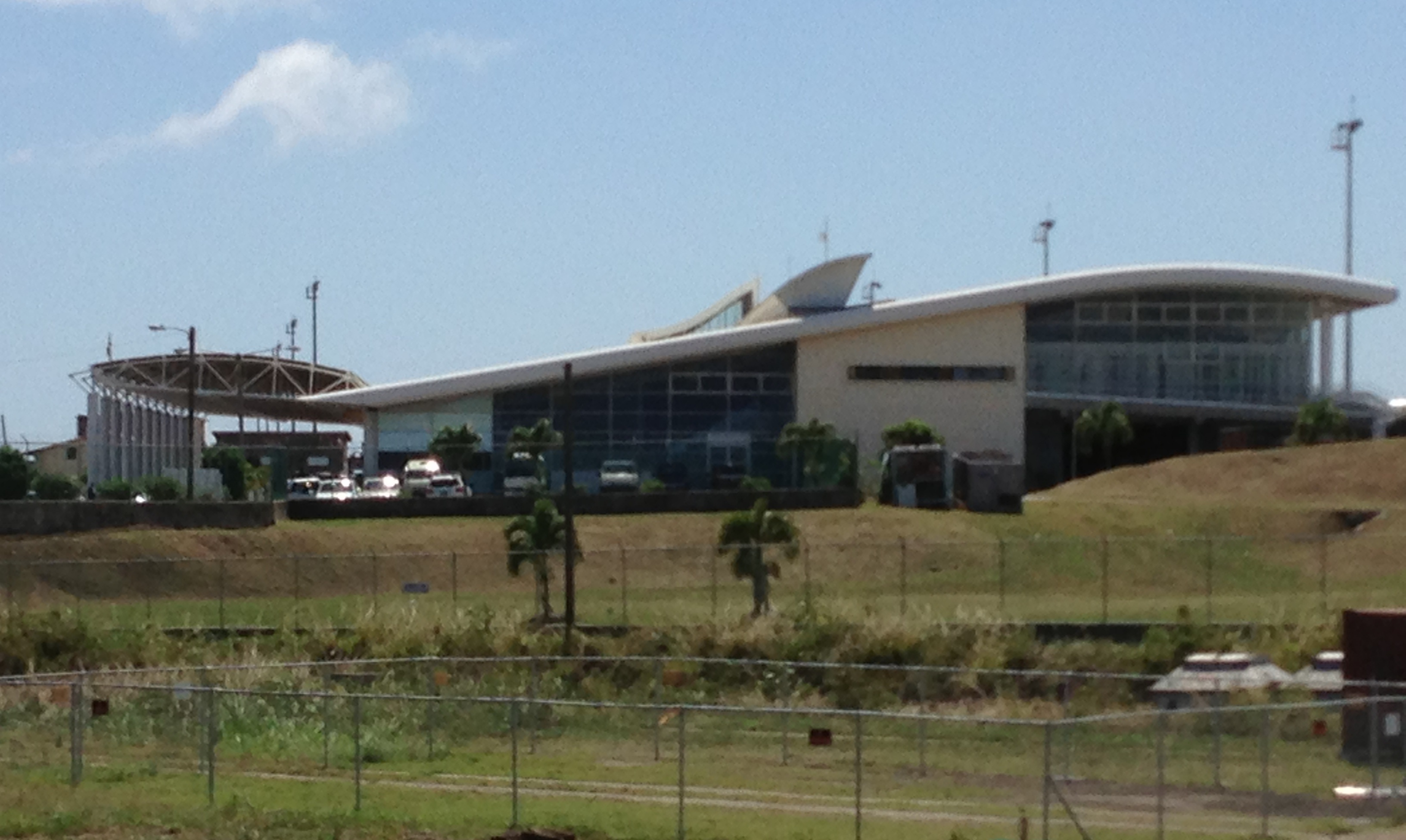
Robert L. Bradshaw International Airport on St Kitts

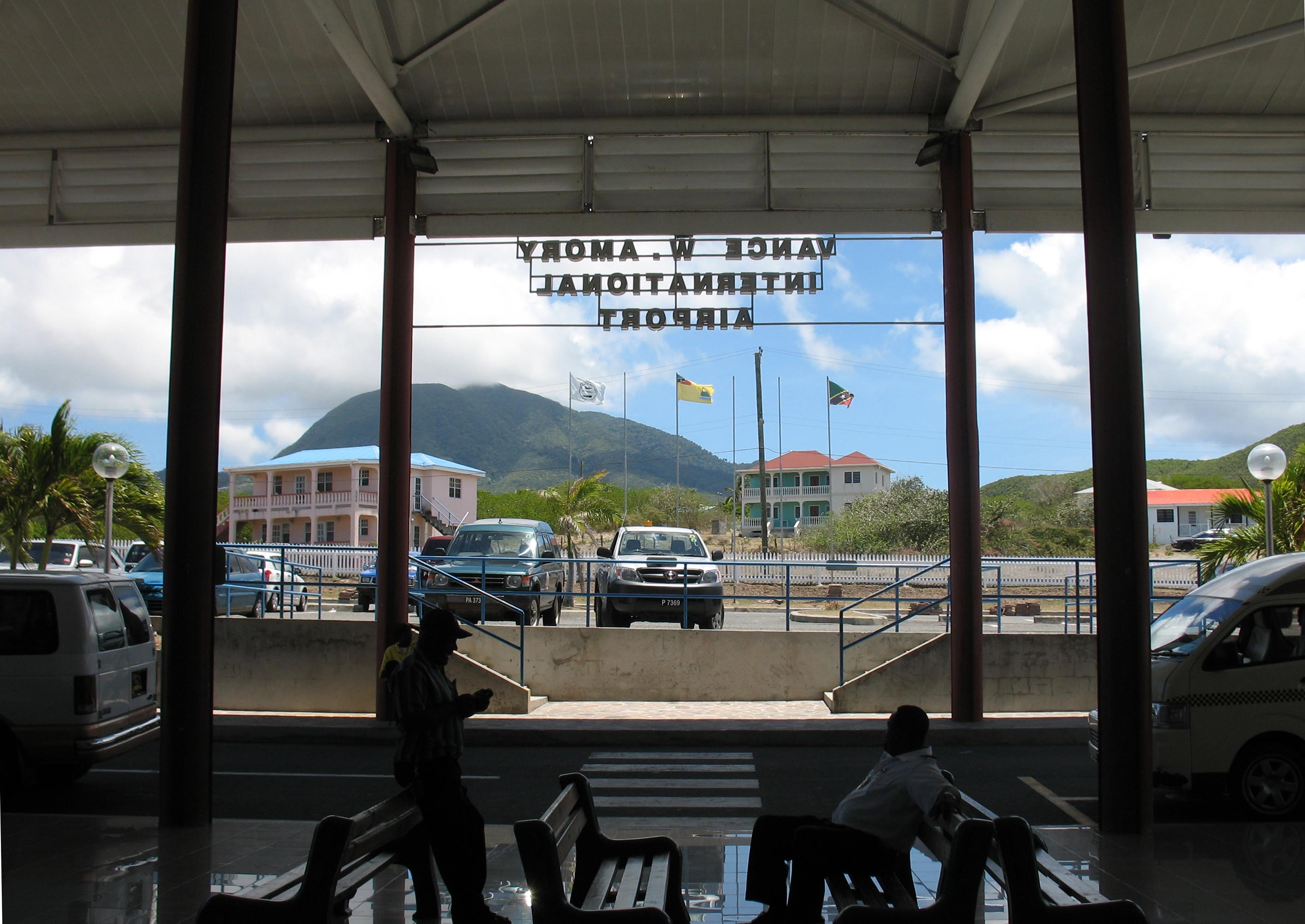
Vance W. Amory International Airport on Nevis

Saint Kitts and Nevis has two international airports. The larger one is Robert L. Bradshaw International Airport on the island of Saint Kitts with service outside to the Caribbean, North America, and Europe. The other airport, Vance W. Amory International Airport, is located on the island of Nevis and has flights to other parts of the Caribbean.

The St Kitts Scenic Railway is the last remaining running railroad in the Lesser Antilles.

=== Science and technology ===
In May 2026, Nevis participated in what was reported as the first space experiment from the Caribbean region. The experiment was launched on 31 May 2026 aboard the Swedish Space Corporation's SubOrbital Express S1X-5/M17 mission from Esrange Space Center in Kiruna, Sweden. The project investigated how altered gravity affects gene expression and cellular function in human immune cells, and included science teachers from Nevis in the design and implementation of the experiment. The Swiss-Caribbean project was initiated and led by University of Zurich space medicine professor Oliver Ullrich and Cora Thiel.

=== Economic citizenship by investment ===
St. Kitts and Nevis allows foreigners to obtain the status of St. Kitts and Nevis citizen by means of a government sponsored investment programme called Citizenship-by-Investment. Established in 1984, St. Kitts and Nevis's citizenship programme is the oldest prevailing economic citizenship programme of this kind in the world. However, while the programme is the oldest in the world, it only catapulted in 2006 when Henley & Partners, a global citizenship advisory firm, became involved in the restructuring of the programme to incorporate donations to the country's sugar industry.

Citizenship-by-Investment Programmes have been criticised by some researchers due to the risks of corruption, money laundering and tax evasion. According to the official website of St. Kitts and Nevis's Citizenship-by-Investment Programme, they offer multiple benefits, including citizenship for life that can be passed down for generations, no residency or language requirements, and citizenship in a financially favourable country. Applicants who are vetted and successfully attain citizenship are eligible to apply for a Saint Kitts and Nevis passport.

To qualify for citizenship under the investment programme, each candidate must complete a vetting process which includes several background and due diligence checks, an interview, and other various legal requirements. This is followed by a qualifying investment into the country. The applicant must make at least a minimum investment in either approved real estate; or a donation, known as the Sustainable Island State Contribution (SISC) into the Federal Consolidated Fund; or a donation to an Approved Public Benefactor.

The official website of St. Kitts and Nevis's Citizenship-by-Investment Programme lists the following investment options:

- An investment in designated real estate with a minimum value of US$400,000, plus the payment of government fees and other fees and taxes.
- A contribution to the Federal Consolidated Fund, or to an Approved Public Benefactor, of at least US$250,000, inclusive of all government fees but exclusive of due diligence fees which are the same as the real estate option.

== Demographics ==
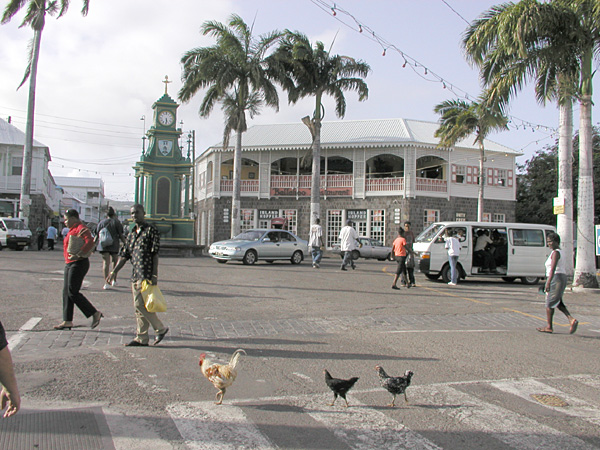
Downtown Basseterre, St Kitts

=== Population ===
The population of Saint Kitts and Nevis is around 53,000 (July 2019 est.) and has remained relatively constant for many years. At the end of the 19th century there were 42,600 residents, the number slowly rising to a little over 50,000 by the mid-twentieth century. Between 1960 and 1990, the population dropped from 50,000 to 40,000, before rising again to its current level. Approximately three-quarters of the population live on Saint Kitts, 15,500 of them in Basseterre. Other large settlements include Cayon (population 3,000) and Sandy Point Town (3,000), both on Saint Kitts, and Gingerland (2,500) and Charlestown (1,900), both on Nevis. It ranks number 209 on the list of countries and dependencies by population.

=== Racial and ethnic groups ===
The population is primarily Afro-Caribbean (92.5%), with significant minorities of European (2.1%) and Indian (1.5%) descent (2001 estimate).

=== Emigration ===
As of 2021, there were 47,606 inhabitants; their average life expectancy is 76.9 years. Emigration has historically been very high, so high that the total estimated population in 2007 was little changed from that in 1961.

Emigration from St Kitts and Nevis to the United States:

- 1986–1990: 3,513
- 1991–1995: 2,730
- 1996–2000: 2,101
- 2001–2005: 1,756
- 2006–2010: 1,817

=== Languages ===
English is the sole official language. Saint Kitts Creole is also widely spoken.

=== Religion ===
Religion in Saint Kitts and Nevis (2011)
1. Christianity (82.6%)
2. Rastafari (1.15%)
3. Hinduism (1.08%)
4. Islam (1.78%)
5. Other (5.28%)
6. No religion (atheism, agnosticism, etc) (8.11%)

Most inhabitants (82%) are Christians, most of whom belong to Anglican, Methodist, and other Protestant denominations. Roman Catholics are pastorally served by the Roman Catholic Diocese of Saint John's–Basseterre, and Anglicans by the Diocese of the North East Caribbean and Aruba.

Hinduism is the largest non-Christian religion, followed by 1.82% of the population; these are primarily Indo-Kittitians and Indo-Nevisians. Islam is the 2nd largest non-Christian religion.

According to the 2011 census, 17% of the population is Anglican, 16% Methodist, 11% Pentecostal, 7% Church of God, 6% Roman Catholic, 5% each Baptist, Moravian, Seventh-day Adventist, and Wesleyan Holiness, 4% percent "Other", made up of Brethren, Evangelical Christians, Hindus, Muslims, and others.

=== Education ===
There are eight publicly administered high and secondary level schools in St. Kitts and Nevis, and several private secondary schools. Education is compulsory between the ages of 5 and 16.

== Culture ==
=== Music and festivals ===
The Mongoose Play, a popular production of folk theatre and music

Saint Kitts and Nevis is known for a number of musical celebrations including Carnival (18 December to 3 January on Saint Kitts). The last week in June features the St Kitts Music Festival, while the week-long Culturama on Nevis lasts from the end of July into early August.

Additional festivals on the island of Saint Kitts include Inner City Fest, in February in Molineaux; Green Valley Festival, usually around Whit Monday in village of Cayon; Easterama, around Easter in village of Sandy Point; Fest-Tab, in July or August in the village of Tabernacle; and La festival de Capisterre, around Independence Day in Saint Kitts and Nevis (19 September), in the Capisterre region. These celebrations typically feature parades, street dances and salsa, jazz, soca, calypso and steelpan music.

=== Media ===
The 1985 film Missing in Action 2: The Beginning was filmed in Saint Kitts.

=== Sports ===
Cricket is common in Saint Kitts and Nevis. Top players can be selected for the West Indies cricket team. The late Runako Morton was from Nevis. Saint Kitts and Nevis was the smallest country to host 2007 Cricket World Cup matches, which were played at the Warner Park Stadium.

Rugby and netball are also common in Saint Kitts and Nevis as well.

The St Kitts and Nevis national football team, also known as the "Sugar Boyz", has experienced some international success in recent years, progressing to the semi-final round of qualification for the 2006 FIFA World Cup in the CONCACAF region. Led by Glence Glasgow, they defeated the US Virgin Islands and Barbados before they were outmatched by Mexico, Saint Vincent and the Grenadines, and Trinidad and Tobago. Atiba Harris is the first footballer from the country to play in Major League Soccer and arguably the most famous footballer from the country. He is the current President of the SKNFA. Despite not representing the country, Marcus Rashford is of descent, as is Cole Palmer.

The national team achieved its greatest success of the modern era when it qualified for the 2023 CONCACAF Gold Cup defeating the Curaçao national football team and the French Guiana national football team in a penalty shootout in the preliminary round. It was drawn into Group A with Jamaica, the United States, and Trinidad & Tobago, but lost all three games.

In track and field, Kim Collins won gold medals in the 100 metres at the 2002 Commonwealth Games and the 2003 World Championships in Athletics. At the 2000 Sydney Olympics, he became the country's first athlete to reach an Olympic final. At the 2011 World Championships, the men's 4 × 100 metres relay team consisting of Collins, Jason Rogers, Antoine Adams, and Brijesh Lawrence, won the bronze medal.

American writer and former figure skater and triathlete Kathryn Bertine was granted dual citizenship in an attempt to make the 2008 Summer Olympics representing St Kitts and Nevis in women's cycling. Her story was chronicled online at ESPN.com as a part of its E-Ticket feature entitled "So You Wanna Be An Olympian?" She ultimately failed to earn the necessary points for Olympic qualification.

St Kitts and Nevis had two athletes ride in the time trial at the 2010 UCI Road World Championships: Reginald Douglas and James Weekes.

== Notable people ==
- Alexander Hamilton (born 1755 or 1757), statesman and Founding Father of the United States
- John Gorrie, a Nevisian-born American who largely invented mechanical refrigeration
- Paul Bilzerian (born 1950), financier convicted of securities fraud
- Sir Edmund Wickham Lawrence (1932–2025), the third governor-general of Saint Kitts and Nevis
- Warrington Phillip (born 1968), former first-class cricketer and convicted murderer
- Shoaib Ahmed Shaikh, also known as SAS, businessman and convicted felon
- Joan Armatrading (born 1950), trailblazing songwriter and musician
- Cole Palmer, whose father is of Nevisian roots, and proudly acknowledges his roots
- Kim Collins, a Kittitian former track and field sprinter; 2003 World Champion for the men's 100 m
- Kimbell Ward (born 1983), FIFA football referee; first from the country to be listed on the FIFA International Referees List
- Mel B (Melanie Brown), entertainer of Spice Girls fame, whose father is Nevisian, and was made a Nevis tourism ambassador in 2022

== See also ==
- Outline of Saint Kitts and Nevis
- Index of Saint Kitts and Nevis–related articles
- ISO 3166-2:KN

== Sources ==
- Cobley, Alan Gregor (1994). Crossroads of Empire: The European-Caribbean Connection, 1492–1992. Department of History, University of the West Indies. ISBN 978-976-621-031-1.
- Constitution (22 June 1983). "1983 Saint Kitts and Nevis Constitution". pdba.georgetown.edu. Archived from the original on 20 August 2017.
