= Booby Island (Saint Kitts and Nevis) =

Saint Kitts and Nevis island

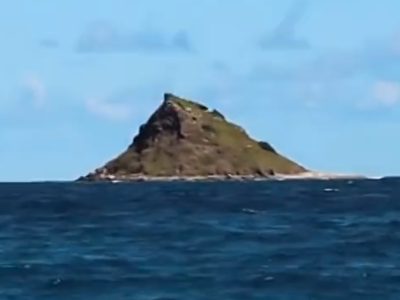
- Booby Island in 2019
- Interactive map of Booby Island

Geography
- Location: The Narrows, Saint Kitts and Nevis
- Coordinates: 17°13′37″N 62°36′38″W
- Area: 1 ha (2.5 acres)
- Length: 38 m (125 ft)
- Highest elevation: 38 m (125 ft)

Administration
- Saint Kitts and Nevis

Demographics
- Population: 0

Additional information
- Time zone: AST (UTC-4)

Booby Island is an uninhabited islet in Saint Kitts and Nevis. It is found in the Narrows, the channel between the islands of Saint Kitts and Nevis, about midway between the two. Booby Island is cone-shaped, consisting of a steep hill and a rocky shoreline. The island is designated as an Important Bird Area by BirdLife International to protect its bird population. The Booby Island Sailing Regatta has been held annually in the waters around the island since 2008.

== Geography ==
Booby Island lies in the Narrows, the channel between the islands of Nevis and St. Kitts, where it is an approximate midpoint between the two islands. It is one of two islands in the Narrows, alongside Cow Island, which measures about 1.8 metres (6 ft) high and 2 metres (6.6 ft) across.

Booby Island is a cone-shaped islet, measuring approximately 1 hectare (2.5 acres) in area. The island predominantly consists of a steep hill with rocky outcroppings, while its shoreline is made up of large rocks. The length across the island and the height of its peak are both approximately 38 metres (125 ft). The interior of the island contains dense populations of brushy plants; no mammals were found on the island in a 2004 survey. A sample of basaltic andesite from Booby Island's southeast coast was predominantly composed of silicon dioxide by weight (56.41%).

== Bird population ==
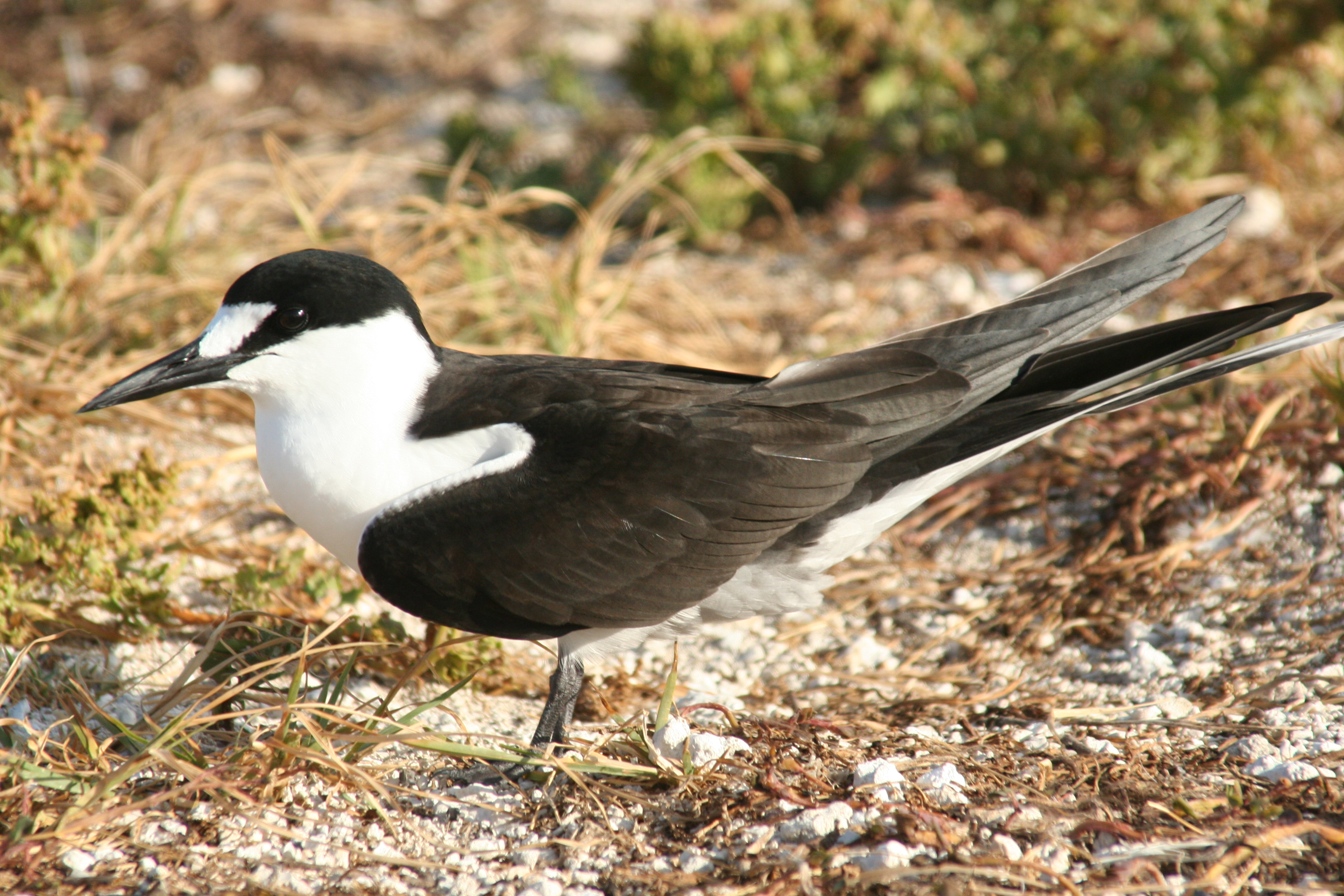
The sooty tern is the most common seabird on Booby Island

Booby Island is a major seabird nesting site in St. Kitts and Nevis. BirdLife International designated Booby Island as an Important Bird Area, which includes the entire island and seas up to one kilometre away. Eight species of seabird are found on Booby Island, where nesting season begins in April or May and ends between August and October. Booby Island is not subject to any special environmental protections.

A 1997 survey of the island's seabird population found that it hosted 400 to 600 nesting pairs, and in 2008, it was estimated that there were approximately 425. The most common in the 1997 survey were sooty terns, followed by bridled terns, laughing gulls, roseate terns, and brown noddies. Red-billed tropicbirds can also be found on Booby Island. All of these species are rare to St. Kitts and Nevis and are not found in any part of the country besides Booby Island. The island also has a population of brown pelicans, which are colloquially referred to as "boobies" despite not being members of the Sula genus. The seabird population is fragile, as eggs are easily accessible and chasing birds from their nests causes the eggs to quickly overheat. Fifteen pairs of roseate terns were identified in 1997, but only two were found the following year.

== Human interaction ==
Booby Island is uninhabited. It is controlled by the government of Saint Kitts and Nevis and is not privately owned. The island's geography makes human access challenging, as boats cannot dock and visitors must swim over the rocky shoreline. Fishermen sometimes collect the eggs of laughing gulls and other species of bird, which may have a negative effect on the bird population. Over time, the fishing community of Newcastle has shifted its fishing grounds from the coasts of Nevis and St. Kitts to the coast of Booby Island, to save on fuel use and to avoid overfished areas.

Since 2008, the Booby Island Sailing Regatta has been held annually to promote tourism outside of the usual tourist season. It historically lasted one day, but it deviated from this in 2015 with a three-day event. The main event is the Booby Island Cup, in which sailors race around Booby Island in an informal, open-entry boat race. Three boats participated in the first Booby Island Sailing Regatta, with that number growing to 16 by 2014.

An American student was bitten by a tiger shark while swimming off the island's coast in 2021, resulting in amputation above the knee.
