= Saint Kitts =

Island in the West Indies; part of the Federation of St. Kitts and Nevis

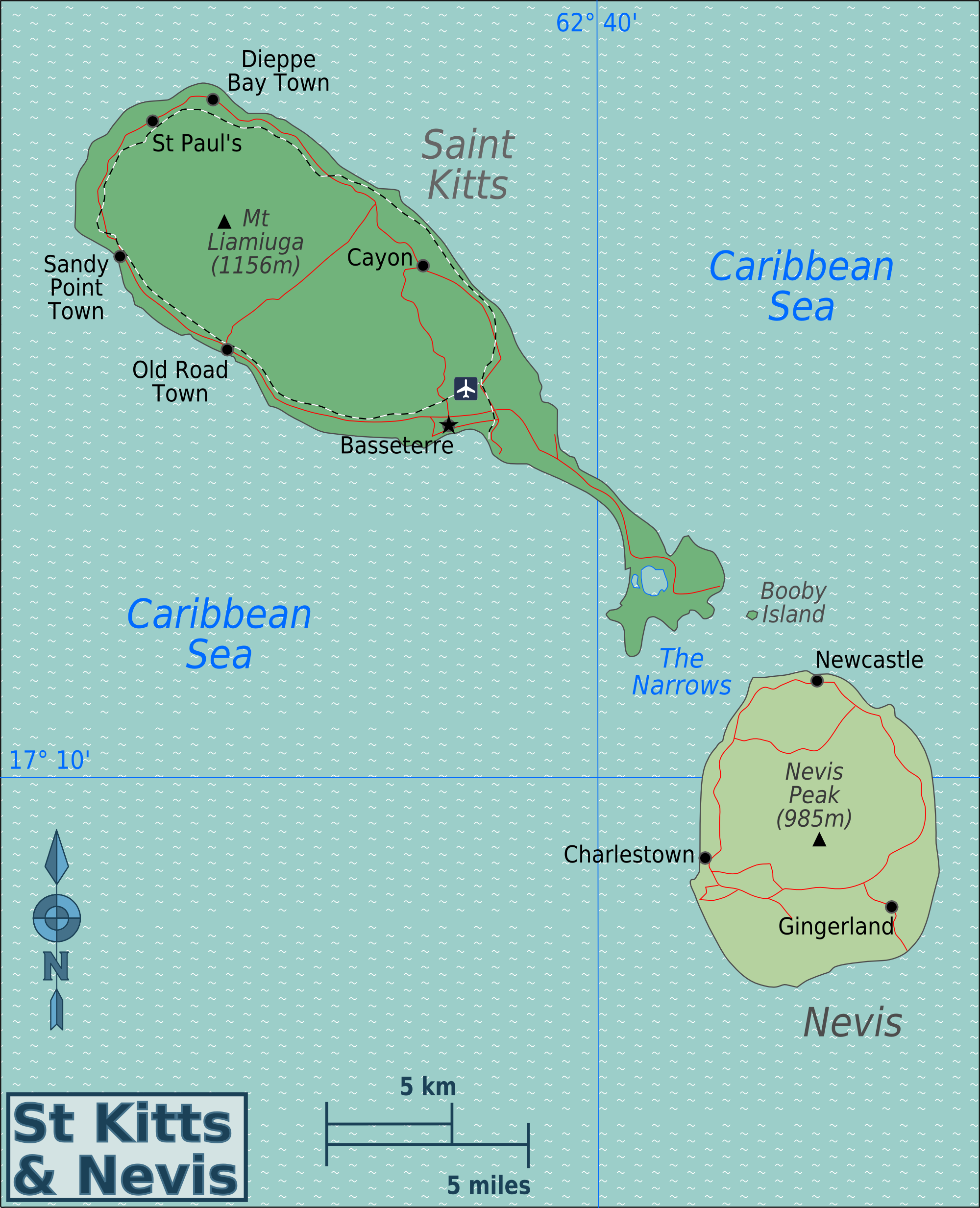
- Map showing Saint Kitts and Nevis

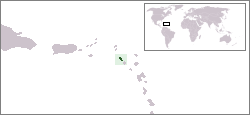
- Location of Saint Kitts among the Leeward Islands.

Geography
- Location: Caribbean Sea
- Coordinates: 17.31°N 62.72°W
- Archipelago: Leeward Islands
- Total islands: 8
- Major islands: 2
- Area: 174 km^{2} (67 sq mi)
- Length: 29 km (18 mi)
- Width: 8 km (5 mi)
- Highest elevation: 1,156 m (3793 ft)
- Highest point: Mount Liamuiga

Administration
- Saint Kitts and Nevis
- 2 divisions of Saint Kitts
- Largest settlement: Basseterre (pop. 15,500)

Demographics
- Population: 34,918 (2011)
- Pop. density: 208.33/km^{2} (539.57/sq mi)
- Ethnic groups: African descent, Indian, Irish, British, Portuguese, Lebanese

Saint Kitts, also known as Saint Christopher, is an island in the West Indies. The west side of the island borders the Caribbean Sea, and the eastern coast faces the Atlantic Ocean. Saint Kitts and the neighbouring island of Nevis constitute one country: the Federation of Saint Kitts and Nevis. Saint Kitts and Nevis are separated by a shallow 3-kilometre (2 mi) channel known as "The Narrows".

Saint Kitts became home to the first Caribbean British and French colonies in the mid-1620s. Along with the island of Nevis, Saint Kitts was a member of the British West Indies until gaining independence on 19 September 1983.

The island is one of the Leeward Islands in the Lesser Antilles. It is situated about 2,100 km (1,300 mi) southeast of Miami, Florida, US. The land area of Saint Kitts is about 168 km^{2} (65 sq mi), being approximately 29 km (18 mi) long and on average about 8 km (5.0 mi) across.

Saint Kitts has a population of about 40,000, the majority of whom are of African descent. The primary language is English, with a literacy rate of approximately 98%. Residents call themselves Kittitians. The island is named after the Christian Saint Christopher; "Kit" is a formerly common diminutive of "Christopher".

Brimstone Hill Fortress National Park, a UNESCO World Heritage Site, is the largest fortress ever built in the Eastern Caribbean. The island of Saint Kitts is home to the Warner Park Cricket Stadium, which was used to host 2007 Cricket World Cup matches. This made Saint Kitts and Nevis the smallest nation to ever host a World Cup event. Saint Kitts is also home to several institutions of higher education, including Ross University School of Veterinary Medicine, Windsor University School of Medicine, and the University of Medicine and Health Sciences.

== Geography ==
The capital of the two-island nation, and also its largest port, is the town of Basseterre on Saint Kitts. There is a modern facility for handling large cruise ships there. A ring road goes around the perimeter of the island with smaller roads branching off it; the interior of the island is too steep for habitation.

Saint Kitts is 10 km (6.2 mi) away from Sint Eustatius to the north and 3 km (1.9 mi) from Nevis to the south. St. Kitts has three distinct groups of volcanic peaks: the North West or Mount Misery Range; the Middle or Verchilds Range and the South East or Olivees Range. The highest peak is Mount Liamuiga, formerly Mount Misery, a dormant volcano 1,156 metres (3,793 ft) high.

=== Geology ===
The youngest volcanic centre is Mt. Liamuiga, 5 kilometres (3.1 mi) in diameter and rising to an elevation of 1,155 metres (3,789 ft). Its last eruption was 1,620 years ago, corresponding with the Steel Dust series of pyroclastic deposits on the western flank. The Mansion Series of pyroclastic deposits and andesite with basalt layers occur on the northern flank, along with mudflows. This volcano has a crater 900 metres (3,000 ft) wide and 244 metres (801 ft) deep, plus two distinct parasitic domes consisting primarily of andesite, Brimstone Hill and Sandy Point Hill which is coalesced with Farm Flat. Brimstone Hill is noted for having limestone on its flanks, which was dragged upward with the formation of the dome 44,400 years ago. Mt. Liamuiga partially overlays the Middle Range to the southeast. This Middle Range is another stratovolcano 976 m in height with a small summit crater containing a lake. Next in line is the 900 metres (3,000 ft) South East Range, 1 Myr in age, consisting of four peaks. Ottley's dome and Monkey Hill dome are on the flanks, while the older volcanoes represented by Canada Hills, and Conaree Hills lie past the airport and Basseterre on the southeast flank. The Salt Dome Peninsula contains the oldest volcanic deposits, 2.3–2.77 Myr in age, consisting of at least nine Pelean domes rising up to 319 metres (1,047 ft) in height, which includes Williams Hill and St. Anthony's Peak.

== History ==
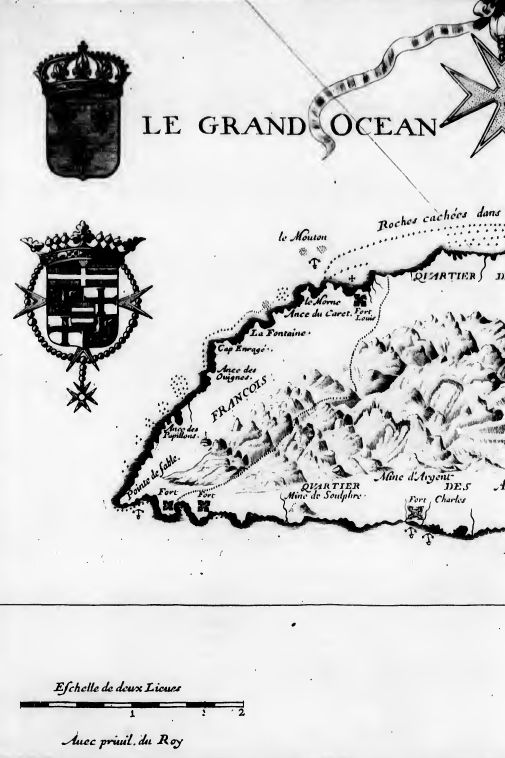
French and English partitions of west St. Kitts, showing the locations of Fort Charles and the sulphur mine further to the west

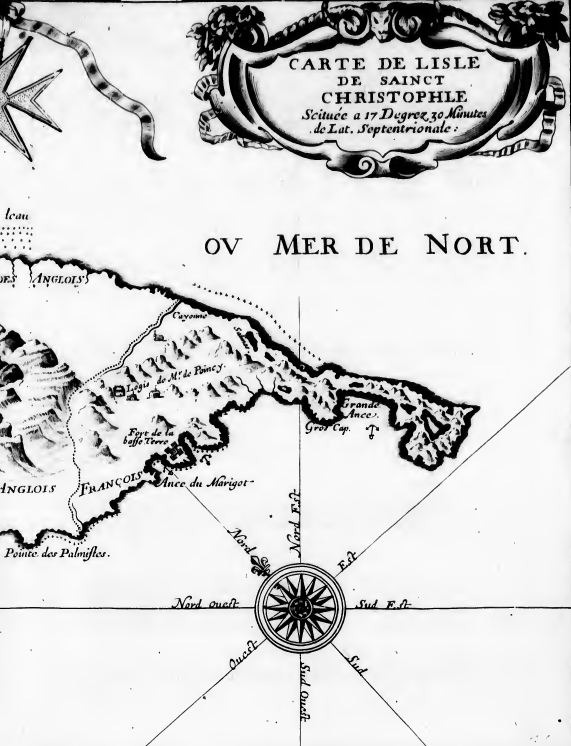
French and English partitions of east St. Kitts, showing the location of Fort Basseterre

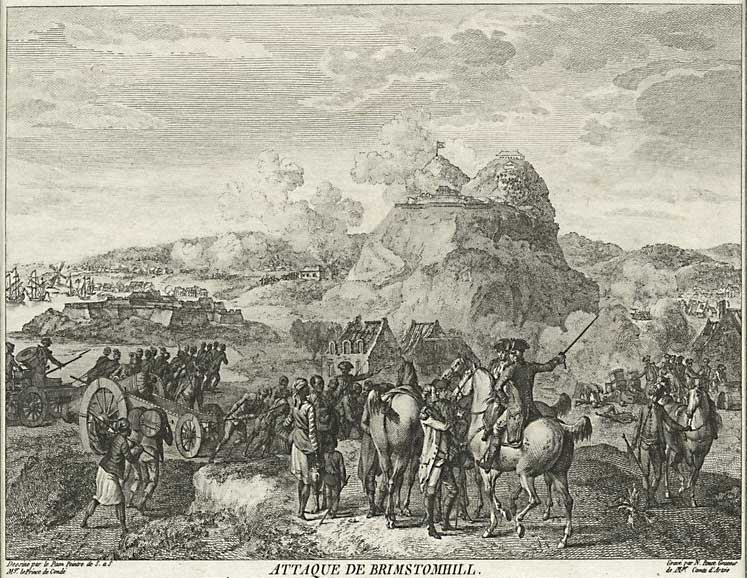
Siege of Brimstone Hill, 1782, as described by an observer in a French engraving titled "Attaque de Brimstomhill"

During the last ice age, the sea level was up to 91 metres (300 ft) lower and St. Kitts and Nevis were one island along with Saba and Sint Eustatius (also known as Statia).

St. Kitts was originally settled by pre-agricultural, pre-ceramic "Archaic people", who migrated south down the archipelago from Florida. In a few hundred years they disappeared, to be replaced by the ceramic-using and agriculturalist Saladoid people around 100 BC, who migrated to St. Kitts north up the archipelago from the banks of the Orinoco River in Venezuela. Around 800 AD, they were replaced by the Igneri people, members of an Arawakan-speaking group.

Around 1300 AD, the Kalinago, or Carib people arrived on the islands. These agriculturalists quickly dispersed the Igneri, and forced them northwards to the Greater Antilles. They named Saint Kitts "Liamuiga" meaning "fertile island", and would likely have expanded further north if not for the arrival of Europeans.

A Spanish expedition under Christopher Columbus arrived and claimed the island for Spain in 1493.

The first English colony was established in 1623, followed by a French colony in 1625. The English and French briefly united to pre-empt a Kalinago ambush. They massacred the local Kalinago, and then partitioned the island, with the English colonists in the middle and the French on either end. In 1629, a Spanish force sent to clear the islands of foreign settlement seized St. Kitts. The English settlement was rebuilt following the 1630 peace between England and Spain.

The island alternated repeatedly between English (then British) and French control during the 17th and 18th centuries, as one power took the whole island, only to have it switch hands due to treaties or military action. Actions included the Siege of Brimstone Hill and the Battle of Saint Kitts. Parts of the island were heavily fortified, as exemplified by the UNESCO World Heritage Site at Brimstone Hill and the now-crumbling Fort Charles.

Since 1783, Saint Kitts has been affiliated with the Kingdom of Great Britain, which became the United Kingdom.

=== Slavery ===
The island originally produced tobacco, but farmers switched to sugarcane in 1640 because of stiff competition from the colony of Virginia. The labour-intensive cultivation of sugar cane was the reason for the large-scale importation of African slaves. The importation began almost immediately upon the arrival of Europeans to the region even though sugarcane wasn't cultivated for another two hundred years on the island, leading some to discredit the earliest claims of imported African labour.

The purchasing of enslaved Africans was outlawed in the British Empire by an Act of Parliament in 1807. Slavery was abolished by an Act of Parliament which became law on 1 August 1834. This emancipation was followed by four years of forced enslavement (1834-1838) against which the nominally freed Africans on St. Kitts revolted and martial law was declared with British warships sent from Antigua to force the rebels back to the plantations. The four years of forced enslavement was referred to as the apprenticeship system and was put in place to protect the "planters" (plantation owners) from losing their free labour force.

1 August is now celebrated as a public holiday and is called Emancipation Day. In 1883, Saint Kitts, Nevis, and Anguilla were all linked under one presidency, located on Saint Kitts, to the dismay of the Nevisians and Anguillans. Anguilla left this arrangement in 1971, after an armed raid on Saint Kitts on the 10th of June 1967.

Sugar production continued to dominate the local economy until 2005, when, after 365 years of having a monoculture, the government closed the sugar industry. This decision was made because of huge losses and European Union plans to greatly cut sugar prices.

== Government ==
For purposes of governing, the island is divided into nine parishes:

- Christ Church Nichola Town
- Saint Anne Sandy Point
- Saint George Basseterre
- Saint John Capisterre
- Saint Mary Cayon
- Saint Paul Capisterre
- Saint Peter Basseterre
- Saint Thomas Middle Island
- Trinity Palmetto Point

These parishes serve as the island's primary administrative divisions.

== Economy ==
Saint Kitts & Nevis uses the Eastern Caribbean dollar, which maintains a fixed exchange rate of 2.7-to-one with the United States dollar. The US dollar is almost as widely accepted on the island as the Eastern Caribbean dollar.

For hundreds of years, Saint Kitts operated as a sugar monoculture, but due to decreasing profitability, the government closed the industry in 2005. Tourism is a major and growing source of income to the island, although the number and density of resorts is less than on many other Caribbean islands. Transportation, non-sugar agriculture, manufacturing and construction are the other growing sectors of the economy.

Saint Kitts is dependent on tourism to drive its economy. Tourism has been increasing since 1978. In 2009, there were 587,479 arrivals to Saint Kitts compared to 379,473 in 2007, a growth of just under 40% in a two-year period. As tourism grows, the demand for vacation property increases in conjunction.

Saint Kitts & Nevis also acquires foreign direct investment from their unique citizenship-by-investment programme, outlined in their Citizenship Act of 1984. Interested parties can acquire citizenship if they pass the government's strict background checks and make an investment into an approved real estate development. Purchasers who pass government due diligence and make a minimum investment of US$400,000, into qualifying government-approved real estate, are entitled to apply for citizenship of the Federation of Saint Kitts and Nevis. Many projects are approved under the citizenship-by-investment programme.

The country hosts an annual St. Kitts Music Festival.

== Transportation ==
Robert L. Bradshaw International Airport serves Saint Kitts.

The Basseterre Ferry Terminal is the base for the ferry service that connects Saint Kitts and sister island Nevis, as well as other nearby destinations.

The narrow-gauge (762 mm (2 ft 6 in)) St. Kitts Scenic Railway circles the island and offers passenger service from its headquarters near the airport, although the service is geared more for tourists than as day-to-day transport for residents. Built between 1912 and 1926 to transport sugar cane from farms to the sugar factory in Basseterre, since 2003 the railway has offered a 3.5-hour, 30-mile (48 km) circle tour of the island on specially designed double-decker open-air coaches, with 12 miles (19 km) of the trip being by bus.

== Notable natives and residents ==
Saint Kitts is or was the residence of:

- Alexander Hamilton
- Sir Kennedy Alphonse Simmonds, first Prime Minister of Saint Kitts and Nevis. Dr. Simmonds instigated Porte Zante and the South East Peninsula Road on Frigate Bay in Saint Kitts which is named in his honour: Dr. Kennedy Simmonds Highway.
- Joan Armatrading, a British singer-songwriter.
- George Astaphan, born in St. Kitts, was a physician who gave steroids to the sprinter Ben Johnson.
- Imruh Bakari, born in St. Kitts, film maker and writer.
- Hutchens C. Bishop, pre-civil-rights-era clergyman who led the 1917 Negro Silent Protest Parade in New York, U.S.
- Robert Bradshaw, first Premier of Saint Kitts and Nevis.
- Archibald Burt, born in Saint Kitts, first Chief Justice of Western Australia.
- Burt Caesar, born in Saint Kitts, actor, broadcaster and director.
- Pogus Caesar, British artist, author, television producer and director.
- Linda Carty, possessing both United States and British citizenship and on death row in Texas.
- Kim Collins, a former world champion sprinter (2003).
- Felix Dexter, an actor, comedian, and writer.
- Pavel Durov, co-founder of VK and Telegram.
- Nikolai Durov, co-founder of VK and Telegram.
- Bertil Fox, born in Saint Kitts, became a professional bodybuilder and was convicted of murder.
- James Grainger, Scottish doctor and planter, who published the georgic poem The Sugar Cane in 1764 and also wrote about diseases among the slaves.
- Keith Gumbs, an international football player who currently plays as a striker for the Liga Indonesia side Sriwijaya FC.
- Sir James Harford, Administrator of Saint Christopher from 1940 to 1946.
- Atiba Harris, a Kittitian footballer who currently plays for FC Dallas, United States, in Major League Soccer.
- Virgil Hodge, a sprinter specialising in the 200 metres event.
- Konris Maynard, a Calypso musician and politician.
- Major-General Sir Robert Nickle, governor of Saint Christopher from 1830.
- Caryl Phillips, born in St. Kitts, novelist, playwright and essayist.
- Tiandra Ponteen, a sprinter specialising in the 200 metres and the 400 metres.
- Marcus Rashford, professional footballer for Manchester United and England. Born in Manchester of Kittitian descent.
- Hercules Robinson, 1st Baron Rosmead, governor of Saint Christopher from 1855 to 1859.
- Sir Cuthbert Sebastian, Governor-General of St Kitts-Nevis from 1 January 1996 to 31 December 2012, his retirement.
- Joseph Matthew Sebastian, a Caribbean trade union leader and politician.
- Shirley Skerrit-Andrew, former High Commissioner to Canada.
- Julius Soubise, a freed Afro-Caribbean slave who became a well-known fop in the UK during the 1760s and 1770s.
- Neil Strauss, an American author and journalist.
- Roger Ver, businessman who renounced his U.S. citizenship.
- Nathaniel Wells, born in St Kitts, British planter, politician and the first black High Sheriff in Britain
- Desai Williams, a former sprinter who won a bronze medal in the 1984 Olympics.
- Ned Young, born in Saint Kitts, was a sailor, mutineer from the HMS Bounty incident and co-founder of the mutineers' Pitcairn Island settlement.
- The Hon Dr Timothy Harris, Prime Minister of Saint Kitts and Nevis (2015–2022).
- The Hon Dr. Terrance Drew, Prime Minister of Saint Kitts and Nevis (2022–present).
- Angela Griffin, a British actress and television presenter. Born in Leeds of Kittitian descent.
- Mikyle Louis, first Kittitian to play Test cricket for the West Indies.

== Gallery ==
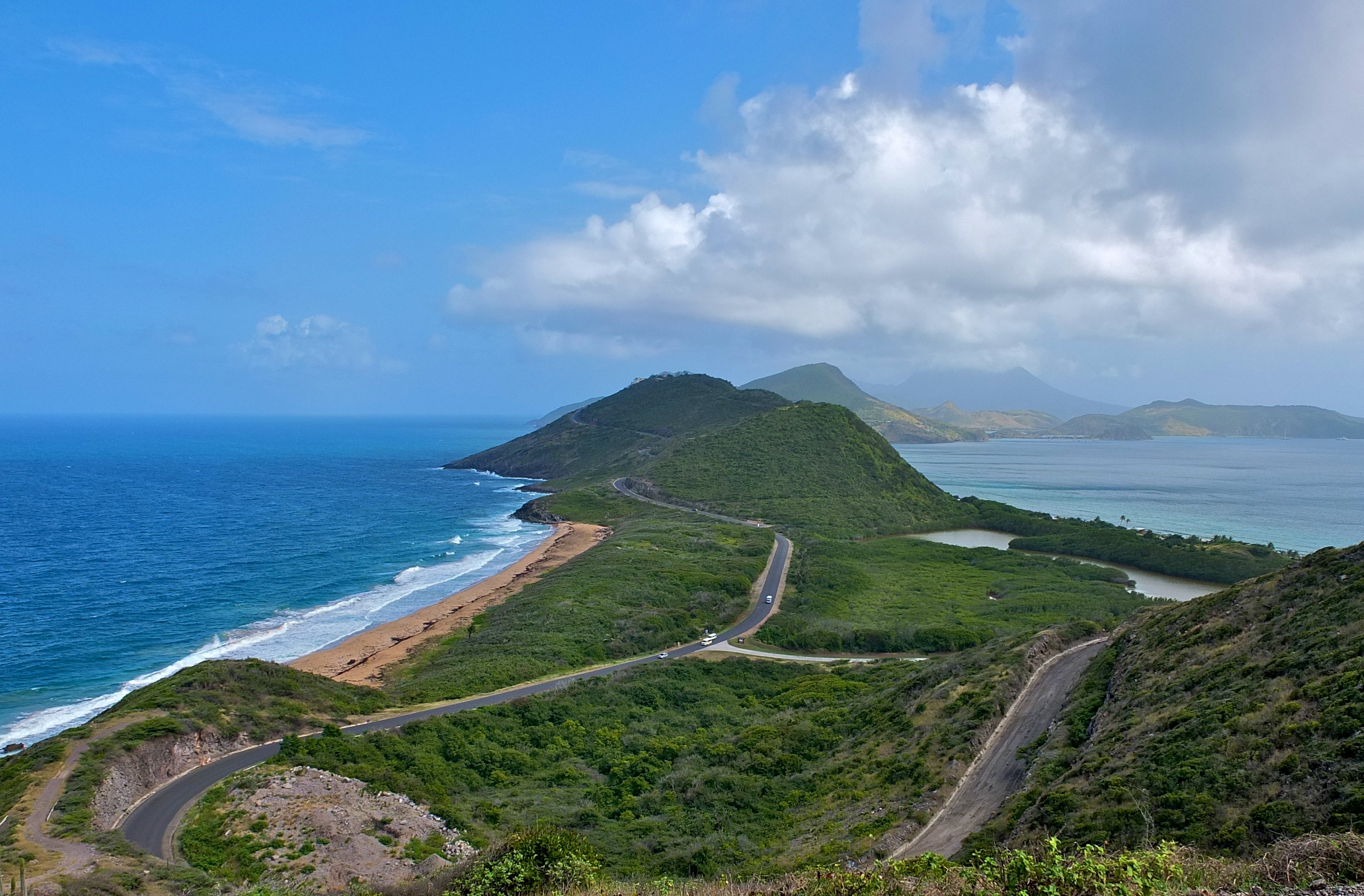
View from Sir Timothy's Hill

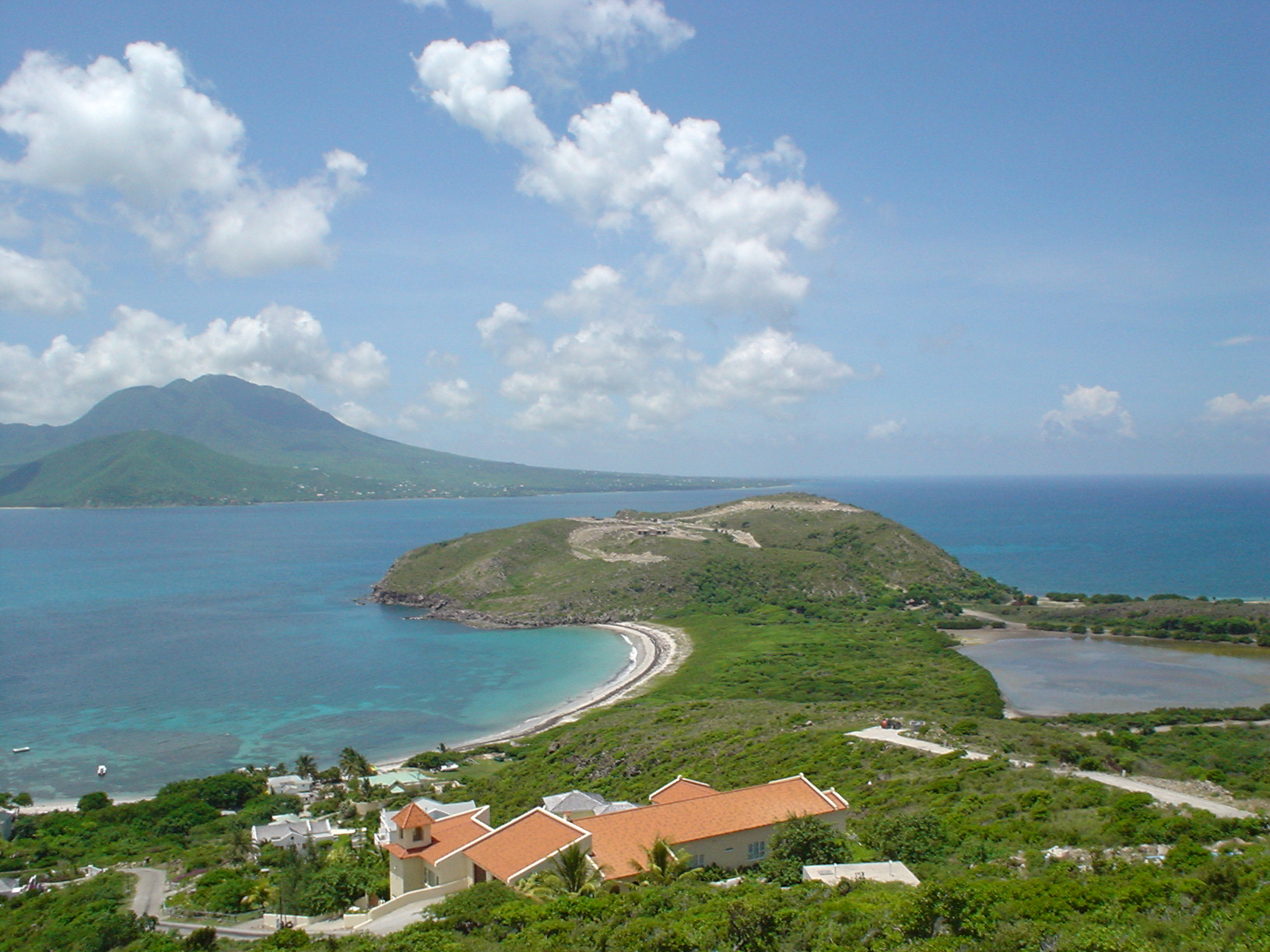
Southeast Peninsula (Saint Kitts). The island on the left is Nevis.

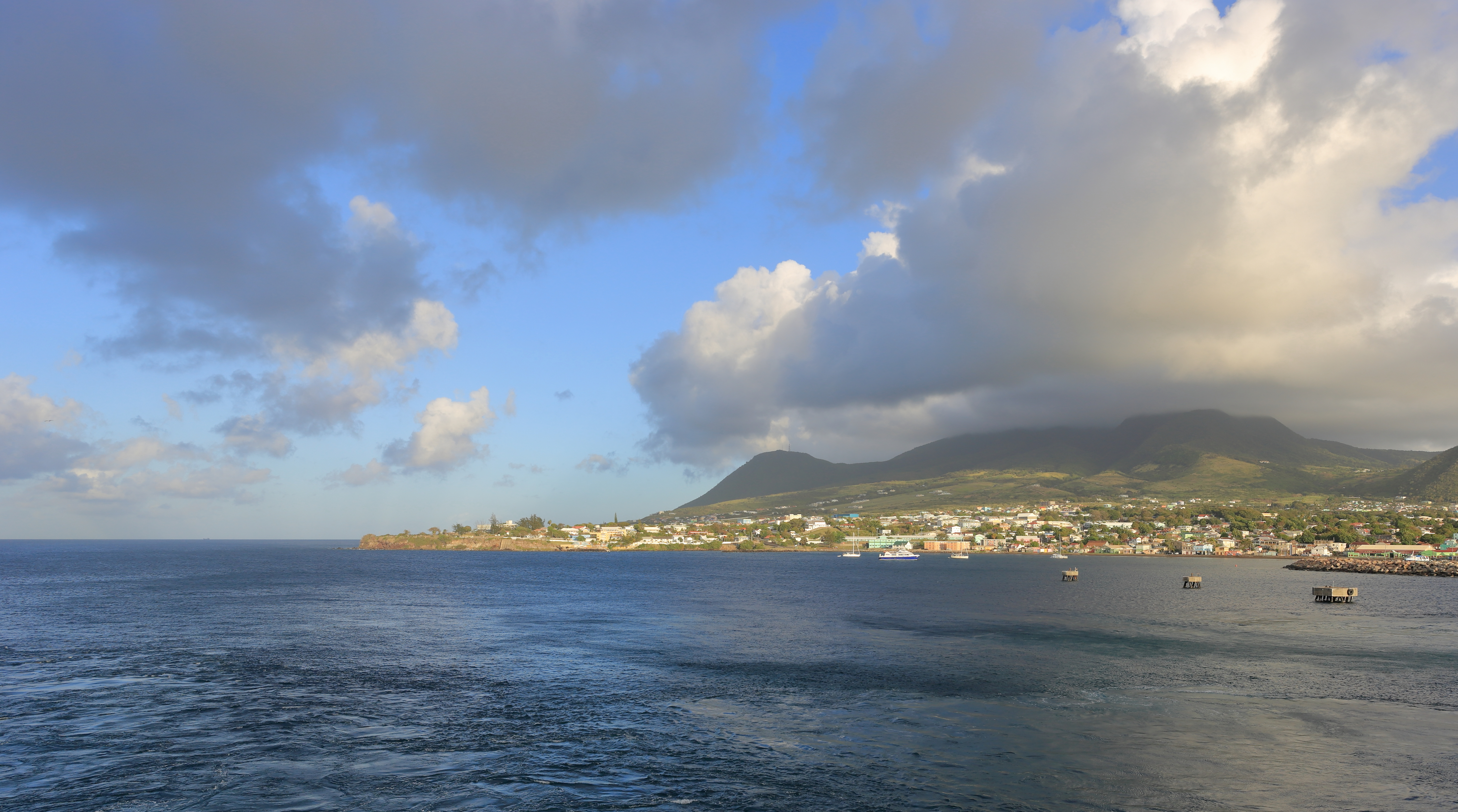
St. Kitts at dawn as seen from a ship entering the port of Basseterre

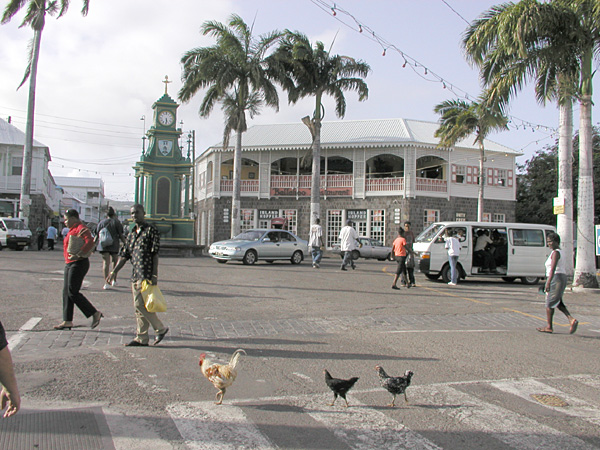
Downtown Basseterre

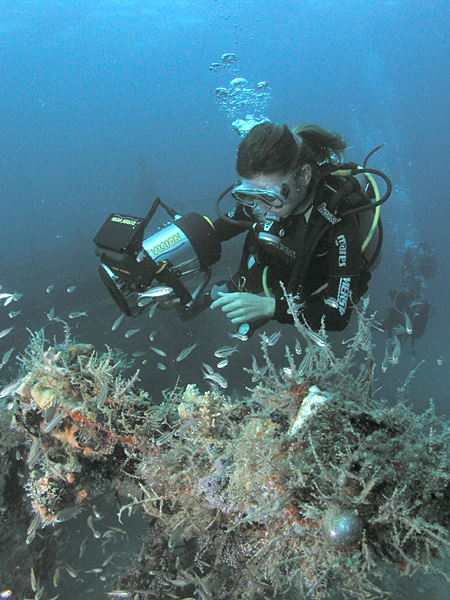
Diver and fish, MV River Taw wreck

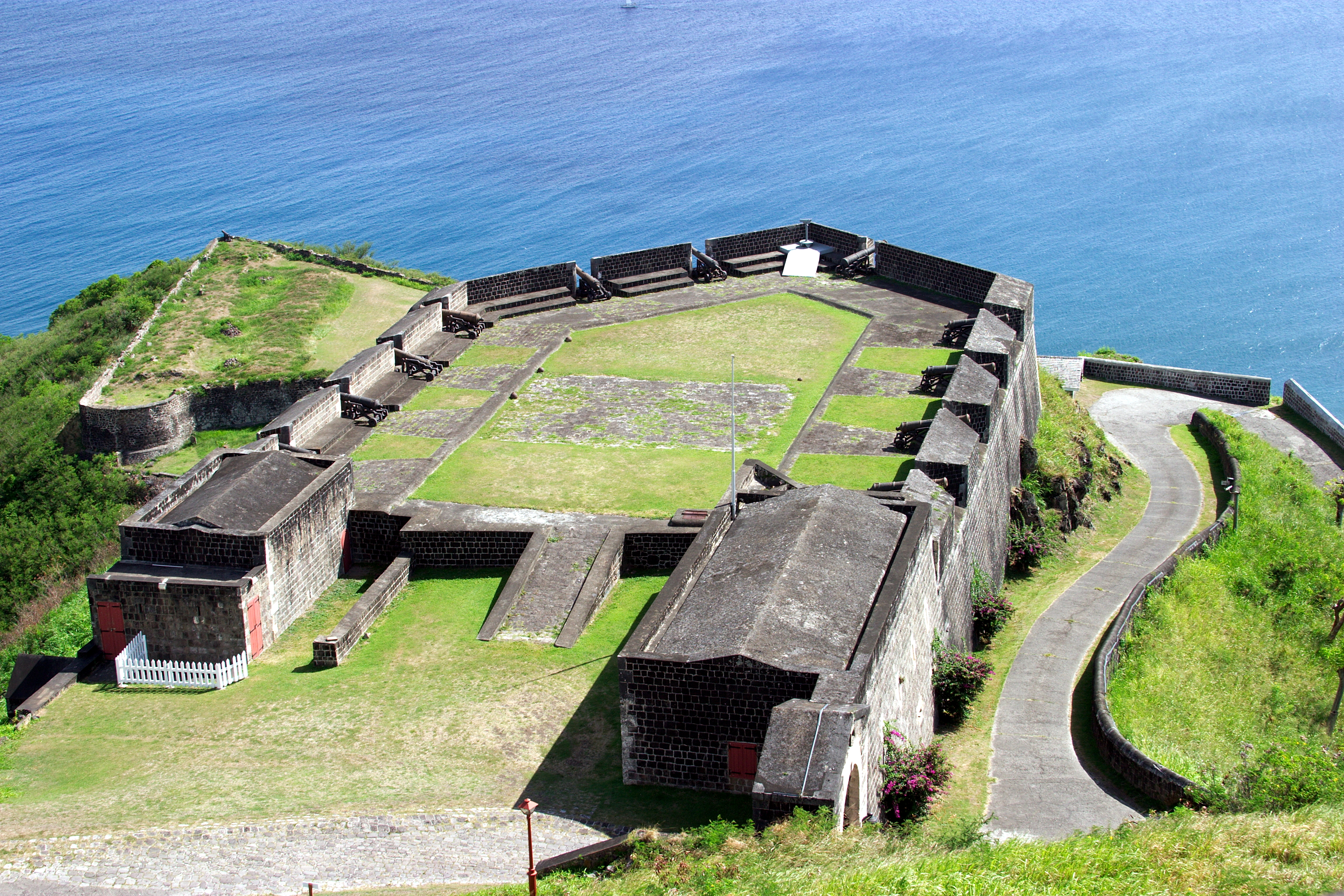
Brimstone Hill Fortress

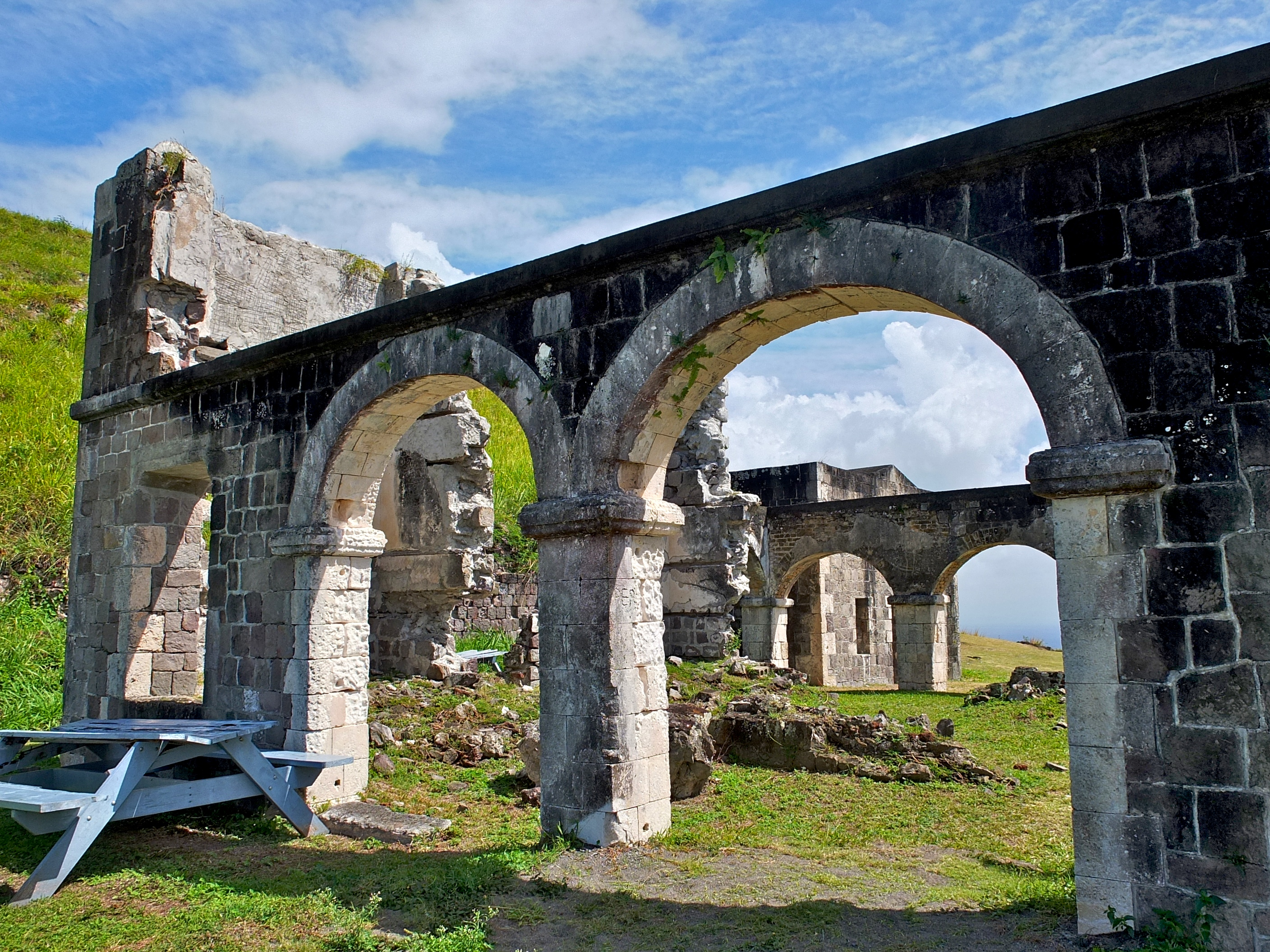
Ruins at Brimstone Hill

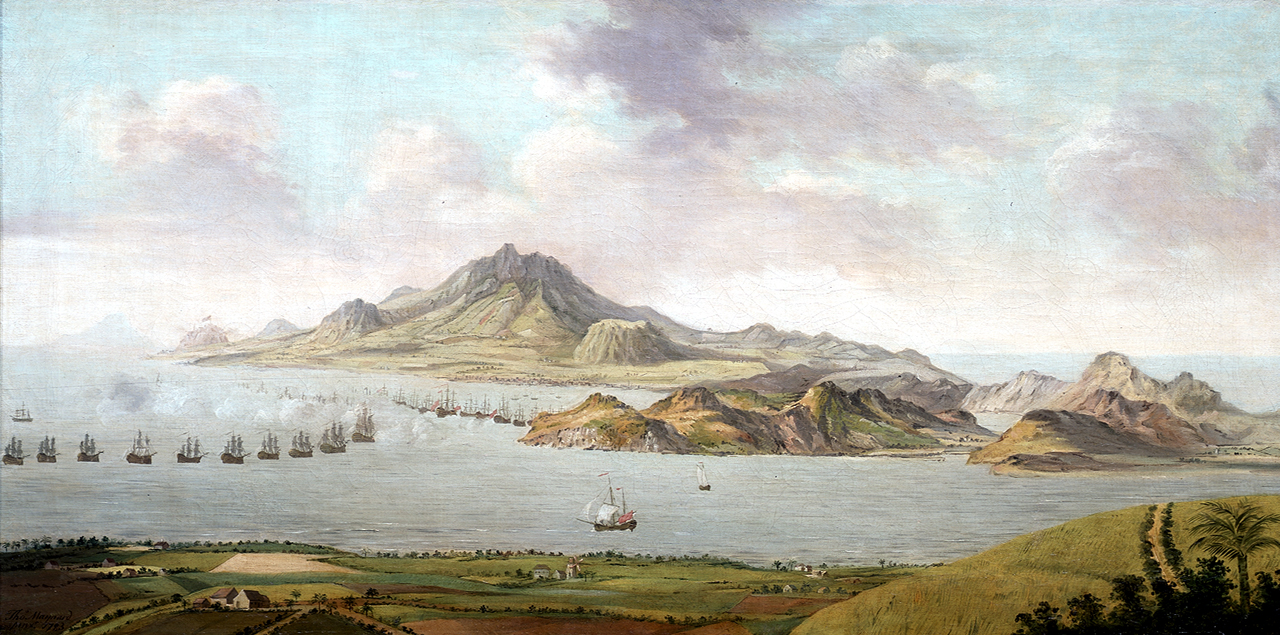
Battle of St. Kitts in January 1782

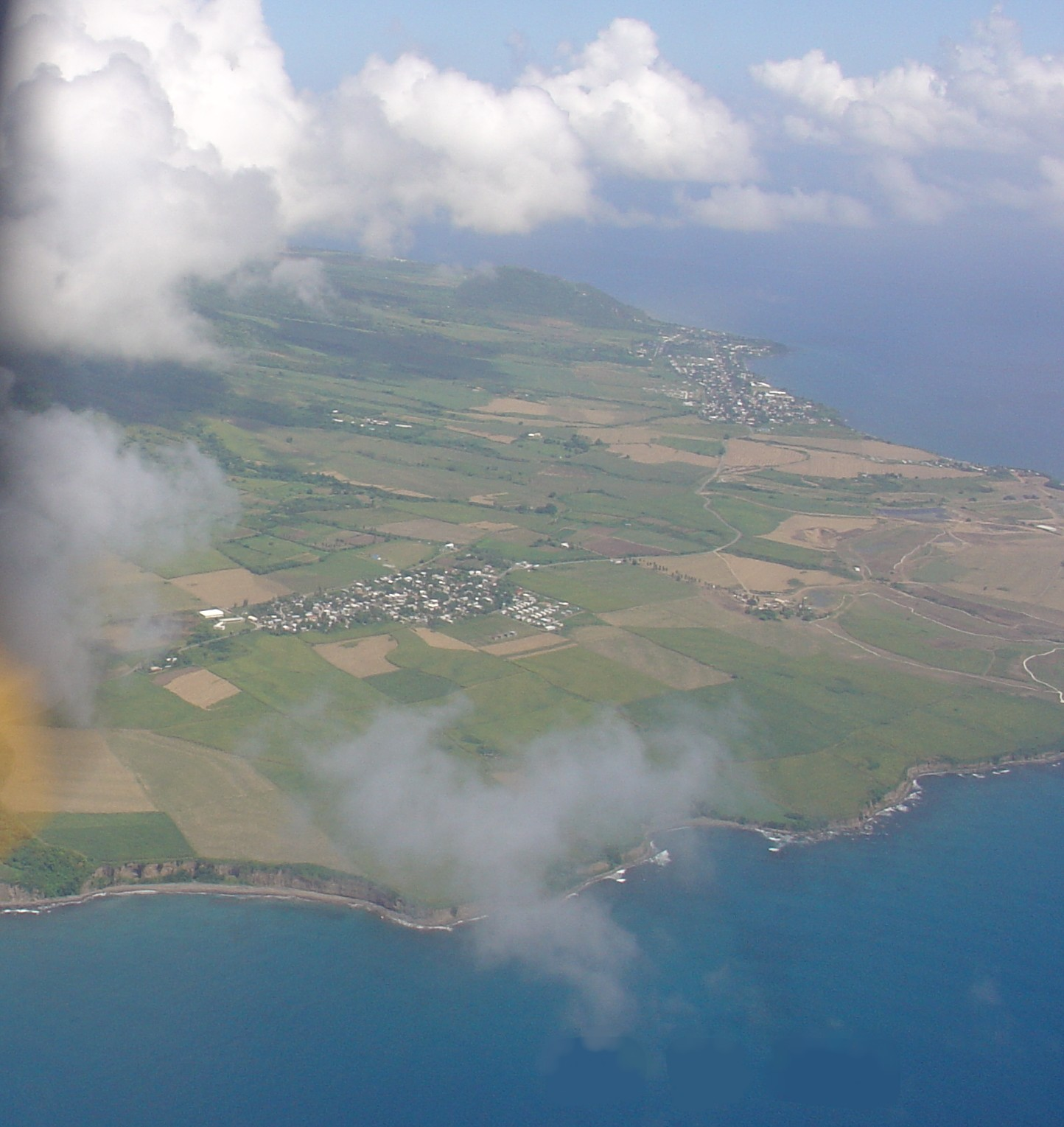
Flying towards the north end of the island, looking down part of the west or Caribbean coast

== See also ==
- Chief Justice of the Leeward Islands
- Culture of St. Kitts and Nevis
- Map of Saint Kitts
- Nevis, St. Kitts' sister island
