= Southeast Peninsula (Saint Kitts) =

Peninsula in Saint Kitts and Nevis

Coordinates: 17°14′N 62°39′W

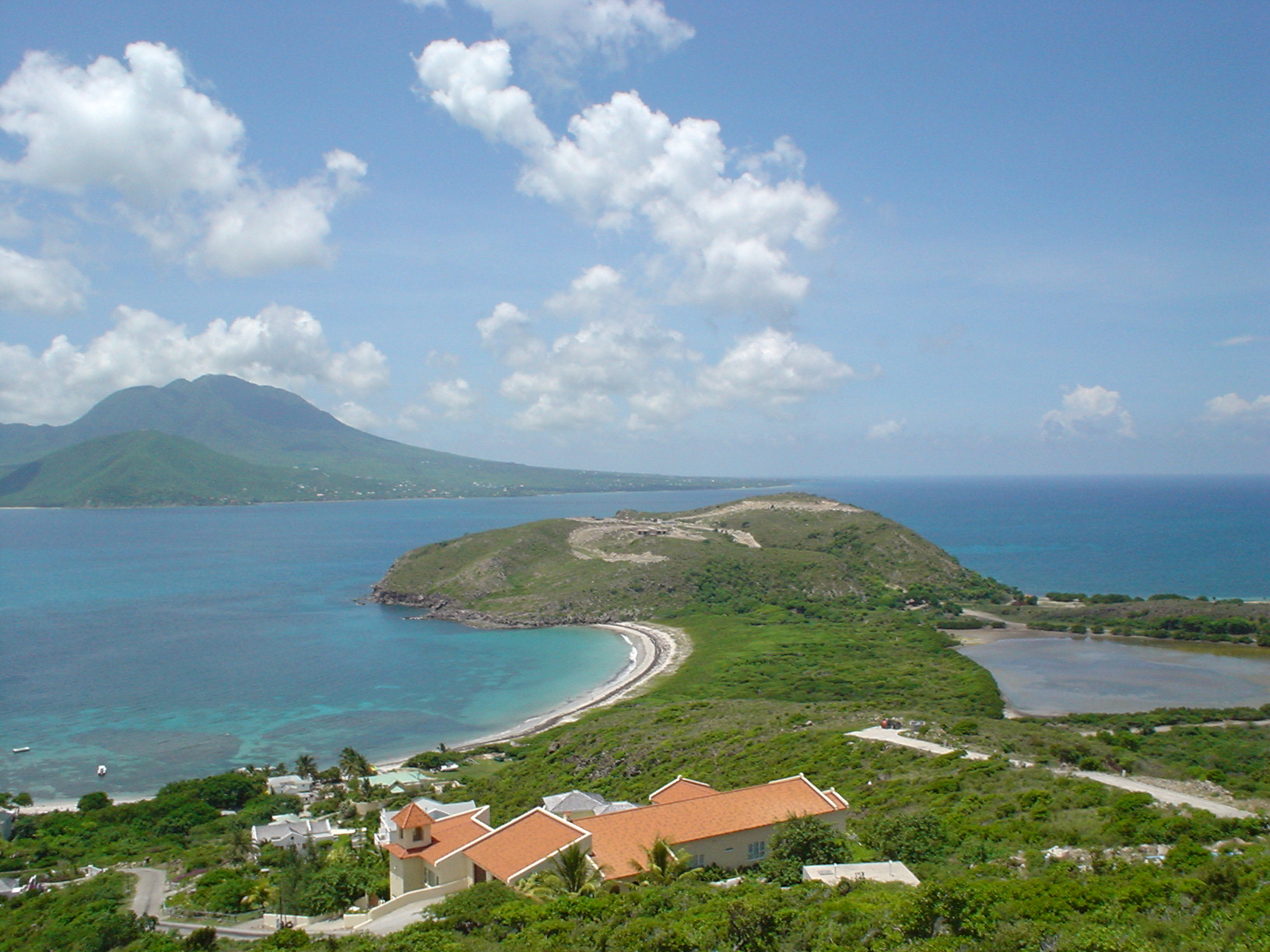
Southeast Peninsula of Saint Kitts, looking southeast towards Nevis island.

The Southeast Peninsula of Saint Kitts is located in Saint Kitts and Nevis, in the Lesser Antilles archipelago of the Caribbean. Great Salt Pond and St. Anthony's Peak can be found on the peninsula, which formed from what was once seven separate islands.

== Geography ==
The peninsula stretches southeast from the country's capital, Basseterre, down to The Narrows, the strait that separates Saint Kitts from Nevis island. The peninsula was formed after seven previously separate islands became linked as tombolos were created between the islands due to deposition, and were subsequently widened out.

The peninsula's landscape is hilly, and dotted with high-salinity lakes. The largest of these lakes is Great Salt Pond, which has become connected its western neighbor Little Salt Pond, which in turn has become connected to the Caribbean Sea, turning the two lakes into one bay. Other features of the peninsula include bays such as Ballast Bay, Major's Bay, Cockleshell Bay and Friars Bay, the 319-meter (1,047-foot) St. Anthony's Peak and Turtle Beach, where leatherback turtles are known to nest. Unlike the rest of Saint Kitts, where beaches are generally made up of volcanic sand of grey or brown colouration, the beaches of the Southeast Peninsula are mostly golden. South of Friars Bay, the sands are instead mostly made of shells and coral.

The peninsula as a whole is much drier than the rest of Saint Kitts, and vegetation primarily consists of succulent shrubbery, with patches of mangroves in the vicinity of Great Salt Pond and Little Salt Pond, which, together with their surroundings, are designated as an Important Bird Area.
