= The Narrows (Saint Kitts and Nevis) =

Strait separating the islands of Saint Kitts and Nevis

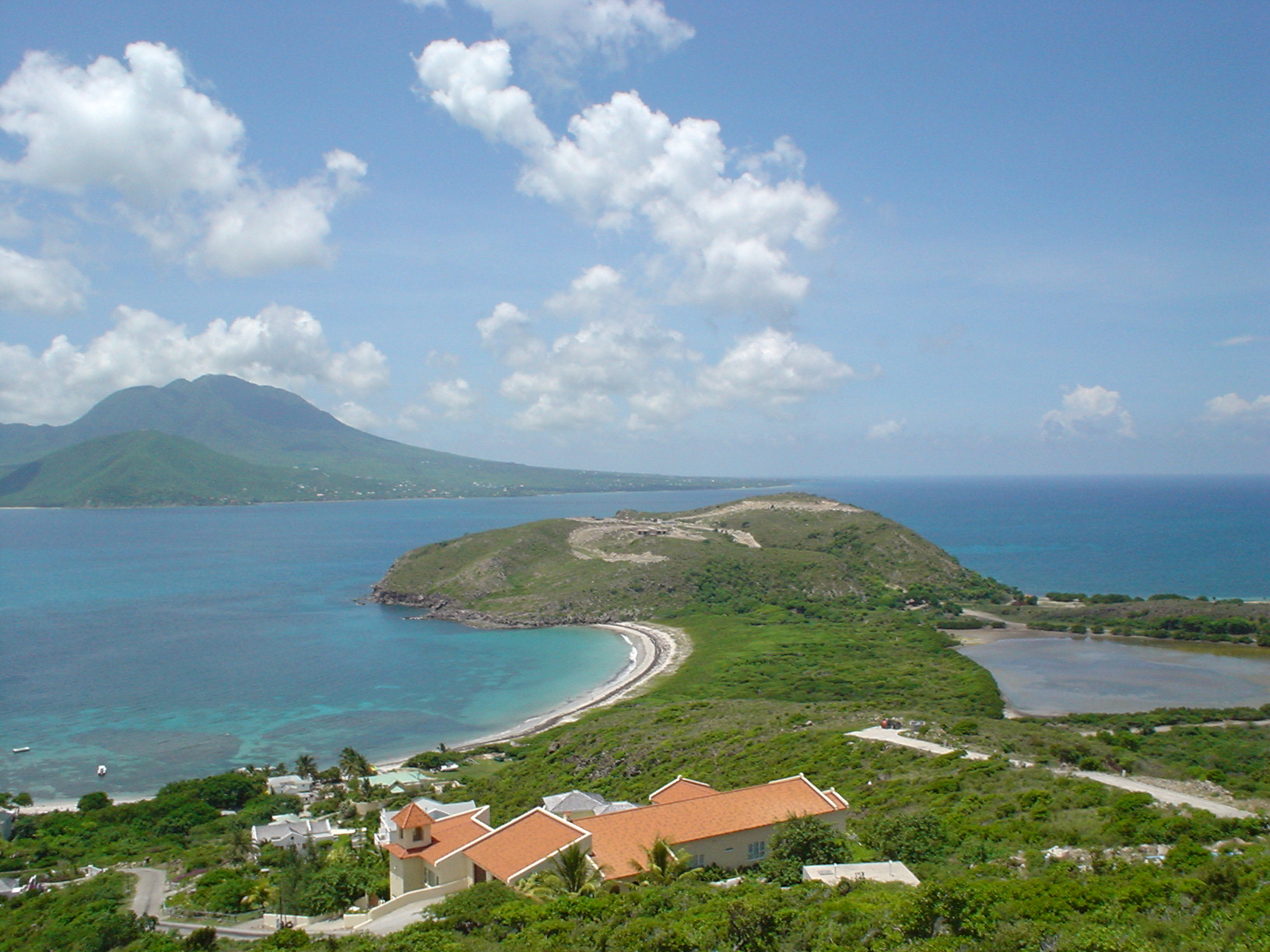
- View of Nevis across the Narrows from St Kitts' Southeast Peninsula.

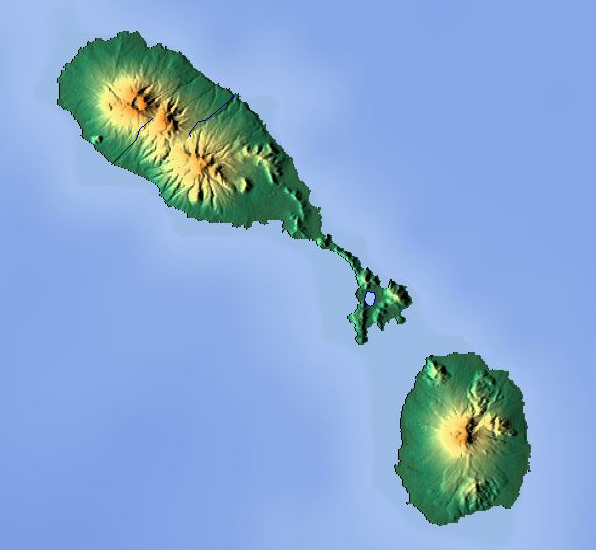
- Location within Saint Kitts and Nevis Location within Lesser Antilles Location within the Caribbean
- Coordinates: 17°12′36″N 62°37′48″W
- Max. width: 3 kilometres (1.9 mi)

The Narrows is the strait that separates the Caribbean islands of Saint Kitts and Nevis. A Sea Bridge ferry traverses the Narrows regularly between Cades Bay, Nevis and Majors Bay at the southern end of St Kitts' Southeast Peninsula several times each day.

== Geography ==
At its narrowest, the Narrows are 3 kilometres wide. A group of small stacks, the Cow and Calf Rocks, lie in the Narrows off the northwest of Nevis. A larger islet, Booby Island, sits close to the Narrows' eastern entrance.

== History ==
The Narrows have been the site of many shipwrecks, notable among them that of the MV Christena, an inter-island ferry which sank with the loss of 233 lives on 1 August 1970. Numerous ships were also wrecked in and near the Narrows during two hurricanes (Hurricane San Agustin and Hurricane San Ramón) in August and September 1772.

It was observed during the 1980s that fish stock and biodiversity in general in the Narrows were deteriorating. In 1986, the Island Resources Foundation developed a marine parks proposal for the Southeast Peninsula area of St. Kitts. In 1998, the St. Kitts Fisheries Management Unit developed a proposal for the preparation of a Management Plan for the development of Marine Protected Areas. In 2006, the Nevis Department of Fisheries developed a proposal for management of the Narrows. As of 2019, a new enhanced management proposal of The Narrows Marine Managed Area (NMMA) in St. Kitts and Nevis was being developed.

== Swimming ==
The strait is a popular long-distance ocean swim. An annual 4.1-kilometre (2.5 mi) competitive swim between Oualie Beach, Nevis, and Cockleshell Bay, St Kitts has been held regularly since 2002. The 2025 event attracted over 400 entrants.
