= Elsa (given name) =

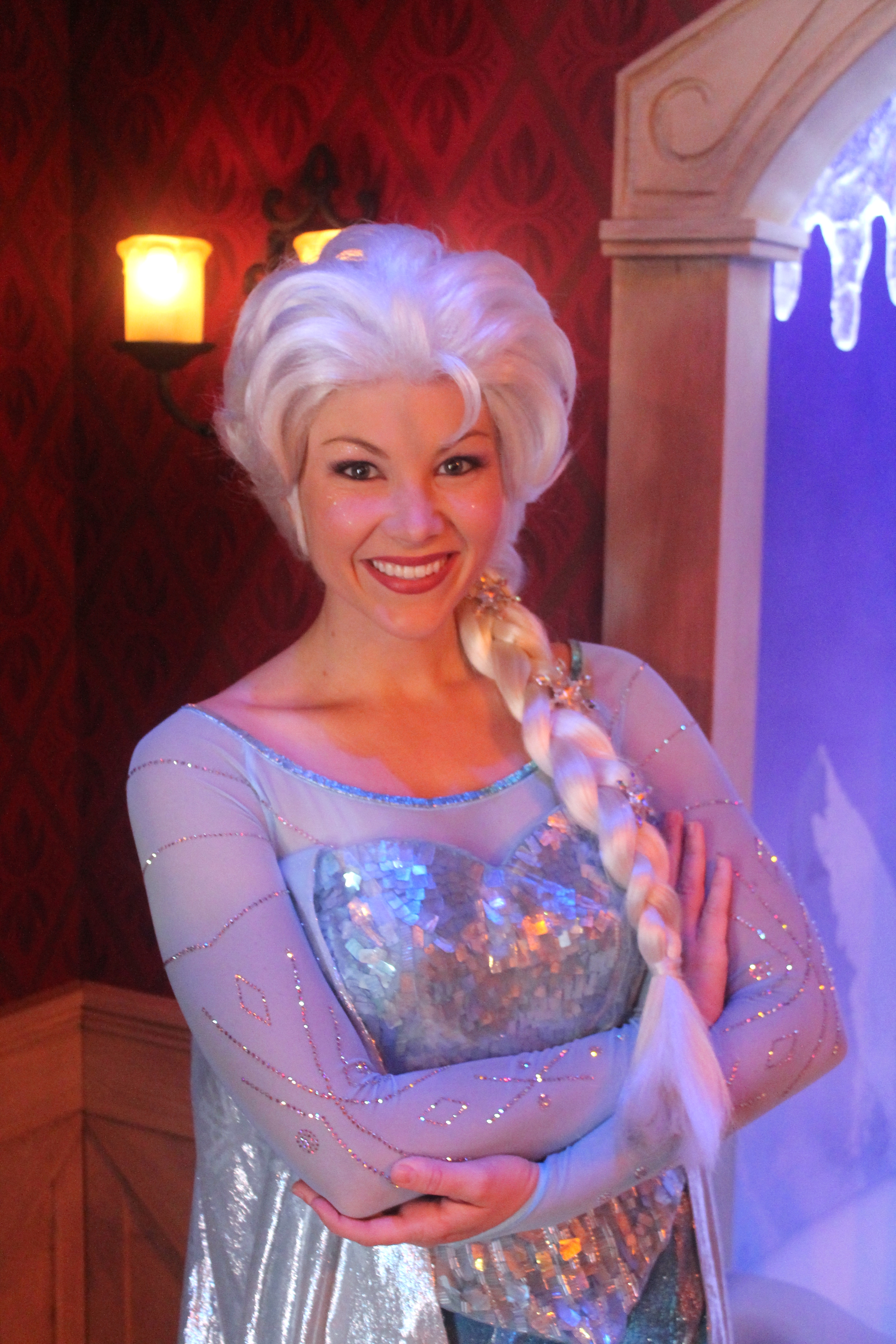
- The character Elsa from the Disney movie Frozen popularized the name.
- Gender: Female

Origin
- Region of origin: Scandinavia

Other names
- Variant forms: Elisabeth, Elisabet, Elisabetta and Elizabeth
- Related names: Eli, Elis, Élise, Eliza, Ella, Elle, Else, Elsie, Elys, Elza, Ilsa, Ilse
- Popularity: see popular names

Elsa is a female name mostly used in the Scandinavian countries.

== Provenance ==
Originally Elsa was simply a short form for the biblical name Elisabeth and some of its variants: Elisabet, Elisabetta and Elizabeth.

The first recorded mentions of the name were in Sweden at the 15th century. The name became generally used after the 19th century.

== Variants ==
- Eli
- Elis
- Elise
- Eliza
- Ella
- Elle
- Else
- Elsie
- Elys
- Elza
- Ilsa
- Ilse
- Els

== Statistics ==

World map showing the countries where the names Elsa or Elza are popular. Any color means the name is among the 100 most popular names either in the population or among newborns.

After the release of Disney's Frozen at the end of 2013, in which a main character is named Elsa, the name became more popular in different countries across the world. In the Faroe Islands and Sweden the name was in the top 10 baby names before the film was released, and became the most popular name afterwards, in 2014 and 2015.

== People ==
- Duchess Elsa of Württemberg (1876–1936)
- Elsa Arnold (1903–1986), German resistance fighter
- Elsa Benítez (born 1977), Mexican model
- Elsa Bienenfeld (1877–1942), Austrian music historian and music critic
- Elsa Borg (1826–1909), Swedish social worker
- Elsa Brändström (1888–1948), Swedish philanthropist
- Elsa Beata Bunge (1734–1819), Swedish botanist
- Elsa Burckhardt-Blum (1900–1974), Swiss painter
- Elsa Castillo (born 1963), Venezuelan teacher and trade unionist
- Elsa Cayo (born 1951), Peruvian-born filmmaker, and photographer
- Elsa Charretier (born 1989), French comic book artist and writer
- Elsa Patricia Galarza Contreras (born 1963), Peruvian economist
- Elsa Ehrich (1914–1948), German Nazi SS concentration camp guard executed for war crimes
- Elsa Einstein (1876–1936), German, Albert Einstein's second wife
- Elsa Eschelsson (1861–1911), first Swedish woman doctor in law
- Elsa Fougt (1744–1826), Swedish publisher
- Elsa von Freytag-Loringhoven (1874–1927), German artist/poet
- Elsa García (gymnast) (born 1990), Mexican artistic gymnast
- Elsa Giöbel-Oyler (1882–1979), Swedish painter
- Elsa Goveia (1925–1980), Guyanese social historian and academic
- Elsa Gye (1881–1943), suffragette
- Elsa Hosk (born 1988), Swedish model
- Elsa Jacoby (1910–1994), Australian actress and soprano
- Elsa Jacquemot (born 2003), French tennis player
- Elsa Johansson (1888–1981), Swedish politician
- Elsa Kazi (1884–1967), German-Pakistani writer, poet, composer, musician, and painter
- Elsa Klensch (1930–2022), Australian-American Fashion Commentator
- Elsa María Kristínardóttir (born 1989), Icelandic chess player
- Elsa Lanchester (1902–1986), English-American actress, probably best known for playing the Bride of Frankenstein
- Elsa Leviseur (1931–2023), South African-born American architect.
- Elsa Lindberg-Dovlette (1874–1944), Swedish writer and princess of Persia
- Elsa Lunghini (born 1973), French singer
- Elsa Majimbo (born 2001), Kenyan comedienne
- Elsa Martinelli (1935–2017), Italian actress and former fashion model
- Elsa Maxwell (1883–1963), American gossip columnist and author, songwriter, and professional hostess
- Elsa Morante (1912–1985), Italian novelist
- Elsa Oseguera (born 1992), Honduran journalist
- Elsa Pataky (born 1976), Spanish actress, model, and film producer
- Elsa Pelgander (born 2006), Swedish footballer
- Elsa Peretti (1940–2021), Italian jewelry designer
- Elsa Ratassepp (1893–1972), Estonian actress
- Elsa Raven (1929–2020), American actress
- Elsa Redmond, American archaeologist
- Elsa Laula Renberg (1877–1931), Sami activist and politician
- Elsa Salazar Cade (born 1952), American entomologist/educator
- Elsa Schiaparelli (1890–1973), Italian fashion designer of the 1920s and 1930s
- Elsa Maria Sylvestersson (1924–1996), Finnish ballet dancer and choreographer
- Elsa Triolet (1896–1970), French writer
- Elsa Danson Wåghals (1885–1977), Swedish visual artist
- Elsa Wilkin-Ambrister, Saint Kitts and Nevis diplomat
- Elsa Zylberstein (born 1968), French actress

== Fictional characters ==
- Elsa (Frozen), from Disney's animated film Frozen
  - Elsa (Once Upon a Time), from the ABC television series Once Upon a Time
- Elsa (Symphogear), a character in the anime series Symphogear
- Elsa Bloodstone, character from Marvel Comics
- Elsa of Brabant, heroine of the Wagnerian opera Lohengrin
- Elsa Dutton, character from television series 1883
- Baroness Elsa von Schraeder, from the film and stage show The Sound of Music
- Elsa Schneider, from Indiana Jones and the Last Crusade
- Elsa Cleeg, of Kim Possible
- Elsa Carrington, character from Secret Agent
- Elsa von Frankenstein, wife of the titular Son of Frankenstein
  - Elsa Frankenstein, daughter of the brother of the Son of Frankenstein, appearing in both The Ghost of Frankenstein and Frankenstein Meets the Wolf Man
- Elsa van Helsing, from Frankenweenie
- Elsa Granhiert, character from Re:Zero − Starting Life in Another World
- Elsa de Sica, from the manga/anime Gunslinger Girl
- Elsa Kanzaki (神崎 エルザ), a fictional character with her Gun Gale Online avatar Pitohui (ピトフーイ) and singer-songwriter in the Sword Art Online spin-off light novel, manga, and anime series Sword Art Online Alternative: Gun Gale Online
- Elsa La Conti, from the video game series Arcana Heart
- Elsa Lichtmann, from the L.A. Noire
- Elsa Shivers from I Know What You Did Last Summer
- Elsa Mars, of American Horror Story: Freak Show, portrayed by Jessica Lange
- Elsa Tilsley, in the British soap opera Coronation Street
- Exelsa, formerly Elsa, from the sitcom La familia P. Luche
- Elsa, from Power Rangers Dino Thunder
- Elsa Korr, from Jojo Rabbit
- Elsa Gardner, from Atypical
- Elsa, from The Fundamentals of Caring
- Elsa, one of the main characters in Armour of God II: Operation Condor
- Elsa, a Pteranodon from We're Back! A Dinosaur's Story

== Other ==
- Elsa the Lioness, subject of the book and film Born Free
- Hurricane Elsa, a Category 1 Atlantic hurricane in 2021
