= Elza (given name) =

- Gender: Unisex
- Name day: October 3

Origin
- Origin: Hebrew
- Meaning: mirthful, my god is abundance, my god is an oath/vow

Other names
- Related names: Elizabeth, Eliza, Elsa,

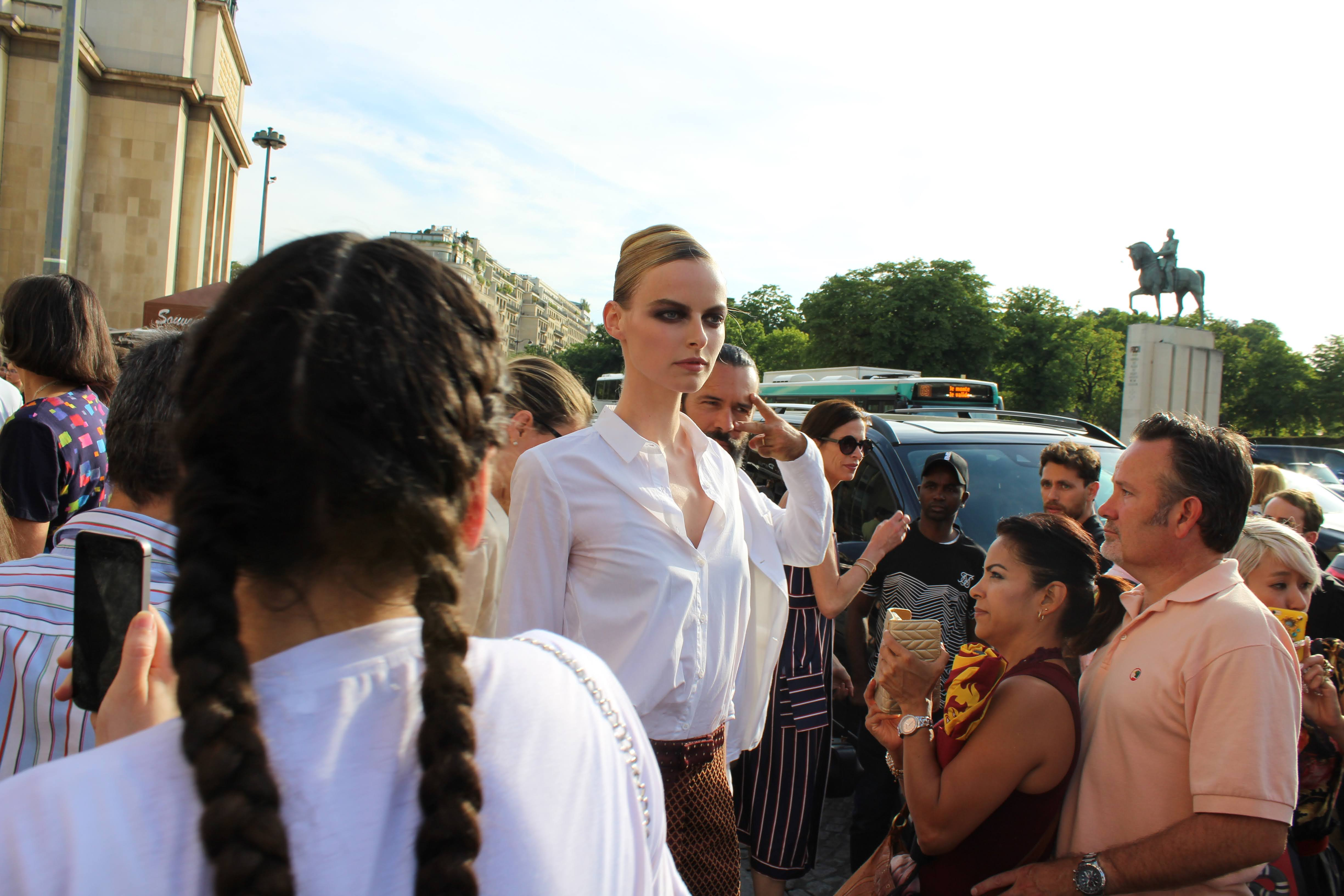
Elza Matiz, a model

Elza is a feminine given name of Hebrew and German origins. A derivation of Elizabeth, and a close variant of the names Elsa, Eliza and Aliza, it is Germanic for "noble".

== People ==
- Elza Berquó (1925–2026), Brazilian demographer
- Elza Goeva (1928–2026), Bulgarian painter
- Elza Jeffords (1826–1885), U.S. Representative
- Elza Kephart, Canadian film director, producer, writer
- Elza Kolodin, Polish pianist
- Elza Kövesházi-Kalmár (1876–1956), Hungarian sculptor
- Elza Kungayeva (1982–2000), Chechen woman abducted, beaten, raped and murdered by a Russian Army Colonel
- Elza Leimane (born 1984), Latvian ballet dancer
- Elza Mayhew (1916–2004), Canadian sculptor
- Elza Medeiros (1921–2009), Brazilian Army officer and World War II veteran
- Elza Radziņa (1917–2005), Latvian actress
- Elza Soares (1937–2022), Brazilian samba singer
- Elza van den Heever (born 1979), South African opera singer

== Fictional characters ==
- Elza Walker, the beta version of Claire Redfield, the protagonist of the 1998 survival horror video game, Resident Evil 2
- Japanese name of Zael, a character from the video game The Last Story
- Inferno Queen Elza, a character in the Japanese role-playing game, Brave Frontier
- Elza Gray, a character that appeared in Sailor Moon (anime)
