= Phinehas Griffin =

Nevisian politician

Junior Minister in the Nevis Island Administration
- In office 1987–1992
- Premier: Simeon Daniel

Member of the Nevis Island Assembly
- In office 1987–1992
- Constituency: Saint James Windward Parish

Personal details
- Born: 15 June 1932 Butlers, Nevis
- Died: 26 September 2015 (aged 83)
- Party: Nevis Reformation Party

Phinehas Elihu Griffin (15 June 1932 – 26 September 2015) was a Nevisian politician who served as a member of the Nevis Island Assembly and a junior minister in the Nevis Island Administration from 1987 until 1992.

== Early life and career ==
Griffin was born in Butlers, Nevis on 15 June 1932, and attended the Saint James Government School. In the 1960s, he moved to England and later returned to Nevis in 1974. He then worked in various jobs including as a bus driver and in Warner Construction, before becoming a foreman in the Public Works Department in c. 1976.

== Political career ==
In 1987, Griffin became a member of the Nevis Island Assembly, representing the Saint James Windward Parish. He was also appointed a junior minister in the Nevis Island Administration with responsibilities for Communications, Works, Public Utilities and Posts, Agriculture, and Education and Health within the Premier's Ministry. He served in government and in the Nevis Island Assembly until 1992.

In 2013, Griffin and other former Nevis Island Assembly members were recognised in an awards ceremony for their past service to the assembly.

== Personal life ==
Griffin and his wife, Florence, were married for 58 years until her death. He was a practicing Christian and a member of the Seventh-day Adventist Church.

Griffin died on 26 September 2015.
