= Hilferding =

Hilferding is a surname. Notable people with the surname include:

- Aleksander Hilferding (1831–1872), Russian linguist and folklorist
- Margarete Hilferding (1871–1942), Austrian psychologist
- Rudolf Hilferding (1877–1941), Austrian-German economist and politician
