= Brick kiln =

Brick kiln or Brick Kiln may refer to:

- Brick kiln, a furnace used to manufacture bricks
- Brick Kiln, a village on the island of Nevis in Saint Kitts and Nevis
- Brick Kiln, a ward in Mansfield (UK Parliament constituency), England
