= Ignaz Ježower =

Ignaz Sebastian Jeżower (17 June 1878 in Rzeszów, Poland – 13 January 1942 in Riga) was a Polish-German cultural historian, writer and translator in Berlin.

== Personal life ==
His early studies were in Vienna in literature and cultural history. His wife Erna Jeżower, nee Münchenberg, was born on the 20th August 1888 in Berlin.

== Career ==
Ignaz Jeżower was a cultural historian and scientist, writer and translator in Berlin.

From 1921 he was the literary director of the Verlages Bong publishing house, for a long time also a lecturer for the Rowohlt-Verlage publishing house. He published several important books and wrote essays, book reviews and theater reviews for various newspapers and magazines, for example the Neuen Merkur (New Mercury).

He was friends with George Grosz, Else Lasker-Schüler, Alfred Döblin, Kurt Schwitters and other artists. Together with Franz Hessel he translated and edited the memoirs "Histoire de ma vie" by Giacomo Casanova (1725–1798).

His most important work is a comprehensive dream anthology, published in 1928, Das Buch der Träume (The Book of Dreams). This monumental work of over 700 pages is a comprehensive dream anthology with interpretations in two parts: first the dreams themselves, then "statements about the dreams", biographies and interpretations. This book helped popularize the modern interpretation of dreams . The Book of Dreams also made an important contribution to cultural history by also presenting the dream as a cultural and aesthetic phenomenon. It also contains a detailed review of dream literature from the 19th and early 20th centuries, including Sigmund Freud's work. The book was dedicated to Alfred Döblin.

From 1931 to 1939, they lived with their daughter Veronika in the Wilmersdorf artist colony. Fellow intellectuals Alfred Kantorowicz, Ernst Busch, Erich Weinert, Peter Huchel, Ernst Bloch and many other celebrities also lived there in the so-called Roten Insel (Red Island) that was hated by the Nazis.

== Nazi Era & Fate ==
On 13 January 1942 Ignaz and Erna Jeżower were driven out of a collection point at the synagogue on Levetzowstrasse 7-8 in the Tiergarten district, with several hundred Berliners through the city to the Grunewald train station where they, and 1,034 others, were placed in 3rd class passenger cars. They were 71 and 61 years old. This train (Transport 8, train Da 44) travelled from Berlin to Riga and they were murdered there upon arrival.

== Works ==
- (Hrsg.): Venezianische Nächte und Träume. Dichtungen von Byron/Dehmel/Geibel/Goethe/Greif/Hesse/Heyse/Hofmannsthal/C.F. Meyer/Nietzsche/Platen/Salus/Schack/Schaukal/Schönaich-Carolath/Strachwitz u. a. Berlin/Leipzig (B. Behrs Verlag) o. J. (um 1910). 2. Aufl. 183 S. marmorierter Pbd. Die 1. Aufl. erschien unter dem Titel 'Der poetische Cicerone 1' (Enthält ferner Dichtungen von Friedrich Adler, Andre Chenier, Felix Dahn, Benno Geiger, Robert Hamerling, Hermann Lingg, Alfred Meissner, Richard Monckton Milnes, Thomas Moore, Alfred Musset, Anton Renk, August Wilhelm Schlegel, Lorenzo Stecchetti, Heinrich Stieglitz, Theodor Suse, Jaroslav Vrchlicky sowie venezianische Volkslieder. Mit einer Einführung des Hrsg.)
- Die Befreiung der Menschheit: Freiheitsideen in Vergangenheit und Gegenwart. Unter Mitwirkung von Paul Adler, Adolf Behne, Eduard Bernstein, Leo Bloch, A. Conrady, Paul Darmstädter, Alfred Döblin, Max Hochdorf, Paul Kampffmeyer, E. Lederer, Friedrich Muckle, Rich. Müller, Paul Olberg, Albert Pohlmeyer, A. E. Rutra, Alexander Stein, Heinrich Ströbel, Veit Valentin herausgegeben von Ignaz Jeżower. Mit zahlreichen ganzseitigen Abbildungen, im Text und auf Tafeln, u. a. v.: F. Hodler; Walter Crane; A. Rethel; Daumier; E. Barlach; Munch; H. Thoma; Th. Th. Heine; K. Kollwitz. Berlin [u. a.]: Bong, 1921
- Jeżower, Ignaz: Die Rutschbahn. Das Buch vom Abenteurer. Mit einigen Tafeln. Ausstattung von George Grosz. Berlin, Leipzig, Wien, Stuttgart: Bong (1922)
- Giacomo Casanova: Erinnerungen, übersetzt und herausgegeben von Franz Hessel u. Ignaz Jeżower. 10 Bände. Berlin, E. Rowohlt, o. J. (1924–1925). (Erste Ausgabe der Memoiren Casanovas).
- Das Buch der Träume. Berlin: Rowohlt, 1928 (Die Träume der Erzväter, der Menschen des Altertums, der Chinesen, des Menschen des Mittelalters, der Reformationszeit, der Romantik, des Weltkriegs, intellektuelle Leistungen im Traum, experimentell erregte Traumbilder, Tr. der Blinden, der Primitiven, der Kinder, Tr. der Tiere. Register der träumenden Personen und der im Tr. erschienenen Personen, Quellenverzeichnis. – Mit Berichten (teils Erstdrucke) der Träume von Alexander dem Großen, Oskar Baum, W. Benjamin, S. Freud, Fr. Hebbel, Jean Paul, A. Strindberg u. v. a. – Eine „Traumanthologie“ beginnend im griechisch-römischen Umkreis, über Mohammedaner, Goethe und sein Umkreis, Hebbel, Heine, Andersen, Strindberg, Richard Dehmel, Franziska zu Reventlow, Wieland Herzfelde, Schopenhauer, Sigmund Freud etc., daneben finden sich Themenkapitel wie Die intellektuellen Leistungen im Traume, Die okkulten Fähigkeiten im Traume u. a. Durch ein Personen- und Sachregister erschlossen.)
- Jeżower, Ignaz (Hrsg.): Briefe an die Jugend aus vier Jahrhunderten. Auswahl und kulturhistorische Einleitungen von Ignaz Jeżower. Berlin: Deutsche Buch-Gemeinschaft, 1932
