= Elza =

Elza may refer to:

- Elza (given name), a feminine given name
- Elza, the codename of Soviet spy Elizaveta Mukasei, active from the 1940s through the 1970s
- Elza, Tennessee, community that existed before 1942 and is now part of the city of Oak Ridge
