= Trastsianets =

Trastsianets refers to the following places in Belarus.

- Maly Trostenets, a village ("Small Trastsianets")
  - Maly Trostenets extermination camp
- Vialiki Trastsianets, a village ("Big Trastsianets")

== See also ==
- Trostenets (disambiguation)
