= Stolpersteine in Loštice =

Memorial installations in Czech Republic

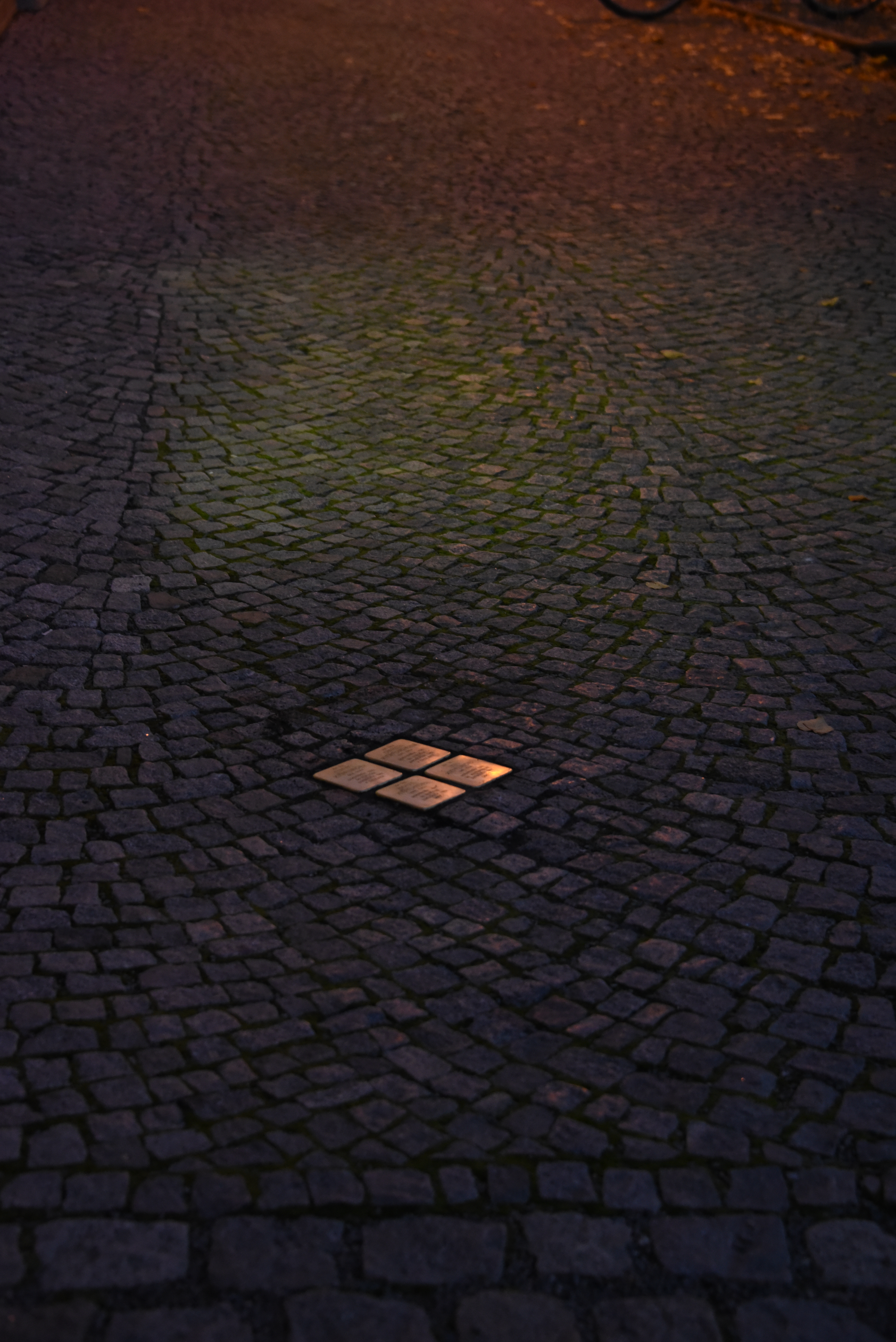
Stolpersteine in Loštice

This article lists the Stolpersteine (Czech: Kameny zmizelých, literally 'stones of the disappeared') in the town Loštice, Czech Republic. Stolpersteine is the German name for stumbling blocks collocated all over Europe by German artist Gunter Demnig. They remember the fate of the Nazi victims being murdered, deported, exiled or driven to suicide.

Generally, the stumbling blocks are posed in front of the building where the victims had their last self-chosen residence.

59 people of Jewish faith were deported from Loštice in 1942; only three survived. On 21 September 2017, the first eight Stolpersteine were collocated in the town to commemorate the inhabitants murdered by the Nazi regime.

== Stolpersteine ==
Stone	Inscription	Location	Life and death
	HERE LIVED; BEDŘICH FUCHS; BORN 1924; DEPORTED 1942; TO THERESIENSTADT; MURDERED 1942; IN MALY TROSTINEC	Ztracená 619/20 (Synagogue) 49.74434°N 16.925277°E	Bedřich Fuchs was born on 7 May 1924 in Bratislava. His parents were Leopold Fuchs and Margareta Fuchsová (both below). He had an older sister named Frieda (also below). Together with his parents and his sister, he was deported on 26 June 1942 from Olumouc by transport AAf to Theresienstadt concentration camp. His transport number was 24. On 14 July 1942, the entire family was deported by transport AAx to the Maly Trostenets extermination camp. His transport number was 305: There, Bedřich Fuchs was murdered along with his parents and his sister.
	HERE LIVED; LEOPOLD FUCHS; BORN 1882; DEPORTED 1942; TO THERESIENSTADT; MURDERED 1942; IN MALY TROSTINEC	Ztracená 619/20 (Synagogue) 49.74434°N 16.925277°E	Leopold Fuchs was born on 12 June or on 12 July 1882 in Bratislava. He was cantor and religion teacher. He married Margareta. The couple had two children: Frieda (born 1922) and Bedřich (born 1924). He worked in Mohelnice, Litovel, Hranice na Moravě, in Dürnkrut in Lower Austria and in his hometown. He, his wife and both children were deported on 26 June 1942 from Olumouc by transport AAf to Theresienstadt concentration camp. His transport number was 21. On 14 July 1942, the family was deported by transport AAx to Maly Trostenets extermination camp. His transport number was 302. There, Leopold Fuchs, his wife and their children were murdered.
	HERE LIVED; FRIEDA FUCHSOVÁ; BORN 1922; DEPORTED 1942; TO THERESIENSTADT; MURDERED 1942; IN MALY TROSTINEC	Ztracená 619/20 (Synagogue) 49.74434°N 16.925277°E	Frieda Fuchsová was born on 22 January 1922 in Užhorod. Her parents were Leopold Fuchs and Margareta Fuchsová. She had a younger brother: Bedřich. She experienced anti-Semitism in the form of physical violence by a follower of Hitler, who cursed and beat her while sitting on a bench with non-Jews. No witness dared to intervene. Together with her parents and her brother, Frieda Fuchsová was deported on 26 June 1942 from Olumouc by transport AAf to Theresienstadt concentration camp. Her transport number was 23. On 14 July 1942, the family was deported by transport AAx to Maly Trostenets extermination camp. Her transport number was 304. There, Frieda Fuchsová was murdered together with her parents and her brother.
	HERE LIVED; MARGARETA; FUCHSOVÁ; BORN 1897; DEPORTED 1942; TO THERESIENSTADT; MURDERED 1942; IN MALY TROSTINEC	Ztracená 619/20 (Synagogue) 49.74434°N 16.925277°E	Margareta Fuchsová was born on 6 June 1897 in Mnichov. She was married to Leopold Fuchs, a cantor and religious teacher. The couple had two children: Frieda (born 1922) and Bedřich (born 1924). Together with her husband and their children, Margareta Fuchsová was deported from Olumouc on 26 June 1942 by transport AAf to Theresienstadt concentration camp. Her transport number was 22. On 14 July 1942, the family was deported to Maly Trostenets extermination camp by AAx transport. Her transport number was 303. Margareta Fuchsová was murdered there together with her husband and the children.
	HERE LIVED; EDMUND; KNÖPFELMACHER; BORN 1876; DEPORTED 1942; TO THERESIENSTADT; MURDERED 1942; IN TREBLINKA	Ztracená 619/20 (Synagogue) 49.74434°N 16.925277°E	Edmund Knöpflmacher was born on 10 June 1876 in Loštice. His parents were Zigmund Knöpflmacher and Ruzena Knöpflmacherová née Klingová. He had nine siblings, three of them died as infants. His siblings were: Anna (later married Glass), Arnold, Berthold, Gisela (later married Alter-Duschinsky) and Lina (married Kellner), Theresia, Elsa and one Sibling with unknown name (died the day it was born). He married Charlota née Mandel (born 1884, see below). The couple had at least two sons, Zikmund (born 1906, see below) and Otto (born 1921, see below). The family ran an egg shop at the main square of the town. Edmund became chairman of the Jewish Community of Loštice. On 26 June 1942, Edmund Knöpflmacher and his wife were transported to Theresienstadt concentration camp by transport AA Olf from Olomouc. Edmund Knöpflmacher's transport number were 37. On 15 October 1942 the couple were deported with Transport Bv to the Treblinka extermination camp. Edmund Knöpflmacher's transport number were 1400. In Treblinka, both were murdered. Both sons were also murdered: Otto in 1941 in Mauthausen, Zikmund in 1942 in Auschwitz. At least three of his siblings were also murdered by the Nazi regime as part of the Shoah: Lina Kellner (also Kellnerová, 1873-1943) and Arnold Knöpflmacher (1882-1944) in Theresienstadt, Gisela Alter-Duschinsky (1886-1944) in Auschwitz.
	HERE LIVED; OTTO; KNÖPFELMACHER; BORN 1921; DEPORTED 1941; TO MAUTHAUSEN; MURDERED 1941; IBIDEM	Ztracená 619/20 (Synagogue) 49.74434°N 16.925277°E	Otto Knöpflmacher was born on 19 August 1921 in Loštice. He was the son of Edmund Knöpflmacher and his wife Charlota née Mandelová. He had an older brother, Zikmund (born 1921). He was deported to Mauthausen concentration camp in 1941 and murdered there. His parents were deported to Treblinka in 1942 and murdered. His brother Zikmund was murdered in Auschwitz.
	HERE LIVED; ZIKMUND; KNÖPFELMACHER; BORN 1906; DEPORTED 1941; TO AUSCHWITZ; MURDERED 1942; IBIDEM	Ztracená 619/20 (Synagogue) 49.74434°N 16.925277°E	Zikmund Knöpflmacher, also Sigmund, was born on 22 June 1906 in ????. He was the son of Edmund Knöpflmacher and his wife Charlota née Mandelová. He had a younger brother, Otto (born 1921). He was deported in 1941 and murdered on June 28, 1942 in Auschwitz concentration camp. His parents were deported to Treblinka in 1942 and murdered there. His brother Otto was murdered in Mauthausen concentration camp.
	HERE LIVED; CHARLOTA; KNÖPFELMACHEROVÁ; BORN 1884; DEPORTED 1942; TO THERESIENSTADT; MURDERED 1942; IN TREBLINKA	Ztracená 619/20 (Synagogue) 49.74434°N 16.925277°E	Charlota Knöpflmacherová née Mandelová was born on 12 April 1884 in Valašské Meziříčí. She was married to Edmund Knöpflmacher. The couple had at least two sons, Zikmund (born 1906) and Otto (born 1921). The family ran an egg shop at the main square. The husband was chairman of the Jewish Community of Loštice. On 26 June 1942, Charlota Knöpflmacherová and her husband were deported from Olomouc to the Theresienstadt concentration camp with Transport AAf. Her transport number was 38. On 15 October 1942, the couple were deported with transport Bv to the Treblinka extermination camp. Charlota's transport number was 1401. In Treblinka, both were murdered. Both sons were also murdered by the Nazi regime, Otto in 1941 in Mauthausen, Zikmund in 1942 in Auschwitz.

== Dates of collocations ==
The Stolpersteine in Loštice were collocated by the artist himself on 21 September 2017.

== See also ==
- List of cities by country that have stolpersteine
