= Eden Brown Estate =

Defunct plantation in Nevis

Coordinates: 17°09′46″N 62°32′56″W

The Eden Brown Estate was a plantation on the island of Nevis in the Caribbean. Now a set of ruins, it is located in Butlers, part of Saint James Windward parish. The estate is 85 m (279 ft) above sea level.

Supposedly the ghost of Miss Huggins haunts the grounds, "lamenting her sorrow and searching for her lost love," according to Hubbard.

The ruined estate Great house was built around 1740 and the sugar estate had various owners in the 19th century.
