= Trostenets =

Trostenets (Тростенец) is a Slavic name of a number of places:

- Trostyanets, several places in Ukraine
- Trastsianets (disambiguation), several places in Belarus
- Troscianiec, places in Poland
