= Grete Forst =

Austrian operatic singer

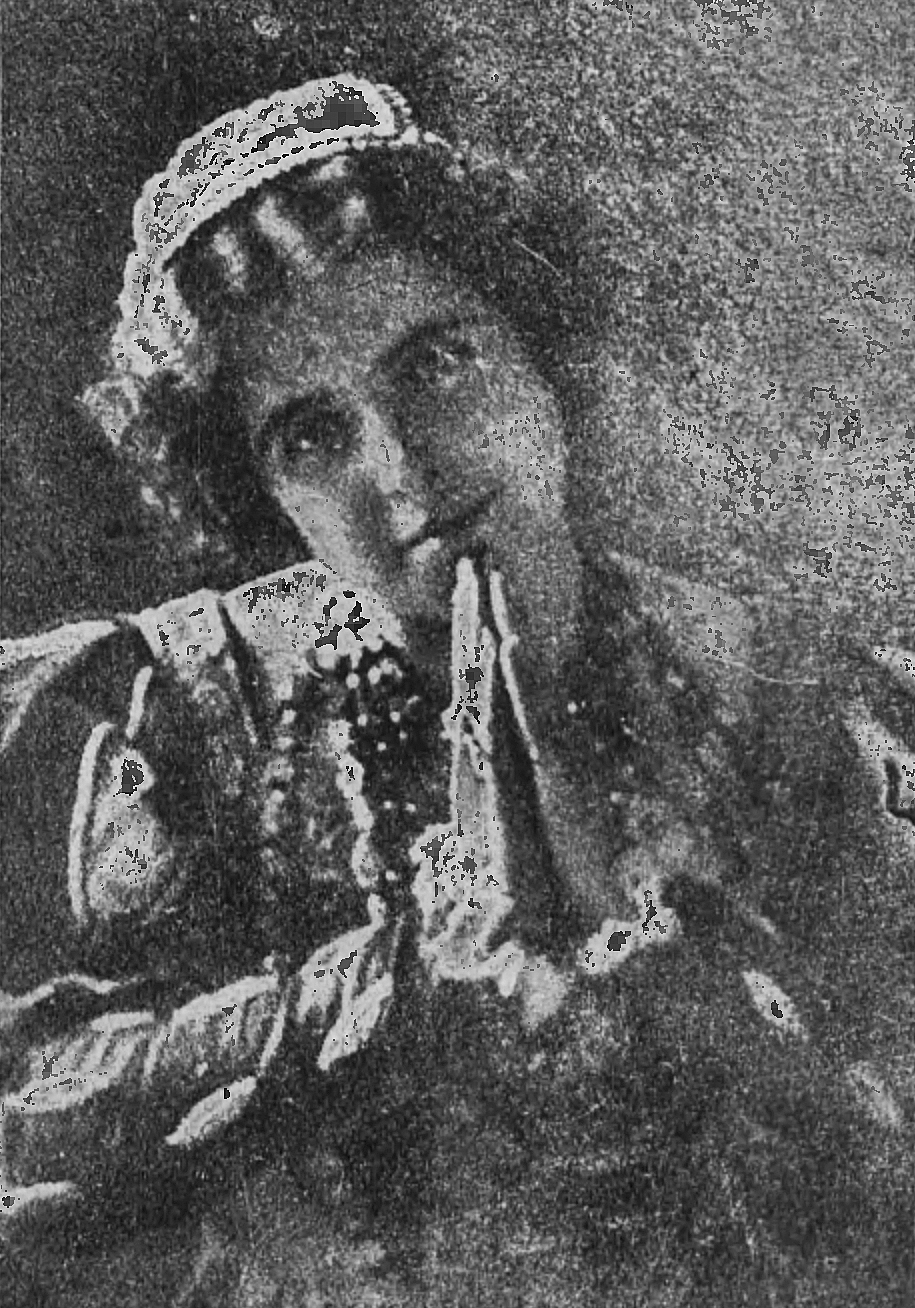
Grete Forst (ca. 1917)

Grete Forst (August 18, 1878 – June 1, 1942) was an Austrian soprano.

Born Margarete Feiglstock to a Jewish family in Vienna, Forst made her operatic debut in Cologne in 1900 in the title role of Lucia di Lammermoor Three years later, made her Vienna State Opera debut in the same role and was made a member of the company by Gustav Mahler. In 1908 she sang in the premiere of Karl Goldmark's Ein Wintermärchen with Leopold Demuth.

She remained in Vienna singing coloratura roles such as Olympia, Queen of the Night, Oscar, and Fiordiligi, as well as lyric soprano roles such as Cio-Cio-San. After she retired in 1911 upon her marriage to banker Johann Schuschny, she continued her career as a concert singer and teacher in Vienna for many years. She had one child, a son, Fritz Schuschny.

She converted to Catholicism in 1940, but on May 27, 1942 she was placed in a transport to the Maly Trostenets extermination camp in Belorussia where she was murdered on June 1, 1942.

== Recordings ==
- Massé Les noces de Jeannette: Air du rossignol avec flûte.
- Rossini Guglielmo Tell (in German) O Seligkeit - the love duet
