= Wilhelm Hummel =

Swiss painter

Wilhelm Hummel (1872–1939) was a Swiss painter. Among his students was Elsa Burckhardt-Blum.
