= Brick Kiln =

Village in Saint James Windward Parish, Saint Kitts and Nevis

- Location in Saint Kitts and Nevis
- Coordinates: 17°11′N 062°33′W
- Country: Saint Kitts and Nevis
- Island: Nevis
- Parish: Saint James Windward

Brick Kiln is a village on the island of Nevis in Saint Kitts and Nevis, located east of Newcastle. Its name suggests the likely existence of a plantation pottery prior to the 18th century. Brick Kiln is located inland on the east of the island, to the north of Butlers.

== Notable people ==
- Elsa Wilkin-Ambrister, diplomat
