= Elsa Wilkin-Ambrister =

Saint Kitts and Nevis diplomat

Elsa G. Wilkin-Ambrister is a Saint Kitts and Nevis diplomat.

== Biography ==
Elsa Wilkin-Ambrister was raised in the village of Brick Kiln in St. James Parish, on the island of Nevis.

Elsa Wilkin-Ambrister served as Deputy Consul General in Dubai. She was Minister Counsellor at the St. Kitts and Nevis High Commission in London. Her educational background includes the Diplomatic Academy of the Russian Ministry for Foreign Affairs (2019) and a Master of Science in Contemporary Diplomacy from the University of Malta (2017-2019). Wilkin-Ambrister has lectured at Strathclyde University and Glasgow Caledonian University in the United Kingdom; University of Maastricht, Maastricht School of Management and Avans School of International Studies in the Netherlands, and the University of Monaco.

In 2022, she was awarded Education Attaché of the Year by Baroness Uddin. She was awarded 2023 Caribbean Diplomat of the Year.

Wilkin-Ambrister is married and has one daughter.
