= Vance W. Amory International Airport =

Vance W. Amory Airport
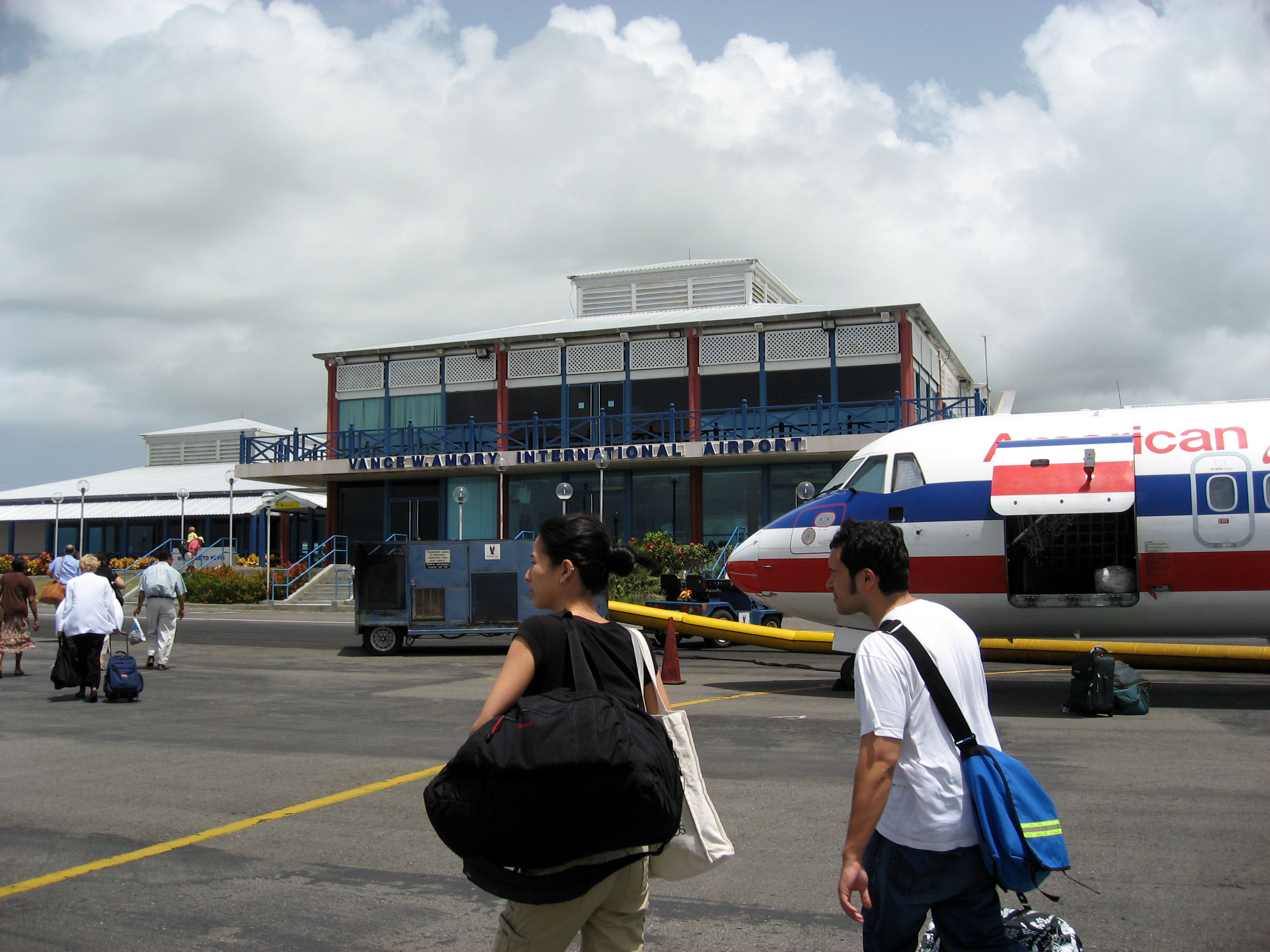
- IATA: NEV; ICAO: TKPN

Summary
- Airport type: Public
- Operator: Nevis Air and Sea Ports Authority
- Location: Newcastle, Nevis
- Elevation AMSL: 14 ft (4.3 m)
- Coordinates: 17°12′20″N 62°35′24″W

Map
- Location on map of Saint Kitts and Nevis NEV (the Caribbean)

Runways
Direction	Length		Surface
Direction	m	ft	Surface
10/28	1,218	3,996	Asphalt
- Source: DAFIF

Vance W. Amory International Airport (IATA: NEV, ICAO: TKPN) serves the island of Nevis in the Federation of Saint Kitts and Nevis. The airport has a single runway, which is approximately 1,220 meters (4,000 feet) long. The airport is located just west of the village Newcastle, Nevis, in Saint James Windward Parish.

The airport was previously known as Bambooshay Airport, then Newcastle Airport. It was renamed in 2002 after the Premier of Nevis, Vance Amory, following the completion of a new, more modern terminal, a new control tower, and an extension to the runway. The airport is available to many aircraft, it being an international airport.

== Airlines and destinations ==
=== Passenger ===
Airlines	Destinations
Cape Air	Saint Croix, Saint Kitts, Saint Thomas
Trans Anguilla Airways	Anguilla
Winair	Sint Maarten
