= Elza Berquó =

Brazilian statistician (1925–2026)

Elza Berquó (17 October 1925 – 16 July 2026) was a Brazilian mathematician and professor known as a pioneer in demography in Brazil. She was among the earliest researchers to identify Brazil's fertility decline, examined in the 1965 study Reprodução humana no distrito de São Paulo.

A graduate of the Pontifical Catholic University of Campinas who completed her doctoral studies in biostatistics at Columbia University, she founded the Center for Studies in Population Dynamics (Cedip) at the University of São Paulo, which conducted research on human fertility and family planning. In the 1980s, she directed the Núcleo de Estudos de População at the State University of Campinas, studying gender and racial topics, particularly health problems faced by the Afro-Brazilian population.

A member of the Brazilian Academy of Sciences, she was awarded the Grand-Cross of the National Order of Scientific Merit in 1998. Berquó died on 16 July 2026, at the age of 100.
