= Butlers, Saint Kitts and Nevis =

Butlers
- Location in Saint Kitts and Nevis
- Coordinates: 17°10′N 062°33′W
- Country: Saint Kitts and Nevis
- Island: Nevis
- Parish: Saint James Windward

Butlers is a settlement in the east of the island of Nevis in Saint Kitts and Nevis. It is located inland from the coast, to the north of Mannings and south of Brick Kiln.

The ruins of the Eden Brown Estate are in Butlers.
