= Elsa Bienenfeld =

Austrian music historian (b. 1877, d. 1942)

Elsa Bienenfeld (born August 23, 1877, in Vienna; murdered May 26, 1942 in the Maly Trostinez concentration camp near Minsk) was an Austrian music historian and music critic of Jewish origin.

== Childhood and adolescence ==
Elsa Bienenfeld was born as the first of four children to her Jewish parents from Krakow. The father was the court and court advocate Dr. Heinrich Bienenfeld (1849–1895), the mother, Viktoria née Schmelkes (1852–1918), came from a well-known rabbi family. Elsa Bienenfeld attended the schools in Vienna that admitted girls at the time and graduated as an external student at the Academic Gymnasium. She was accepted at the age of eight because of her musical talent at the Conservatory of the Gesellschaft der Musikfreunde in Vienna and, at the age of seventeen, completed practical music studies with distinction .

== Study and work ==
She first studied chemistry and medicine at the University of Vienna. Spurred on by a lecture by Guido Adler, Elsa Bienenfeld finally devoted herself to musicology and, in 1904, was the first woman to do her doctorate at the Institute for Musicology at the University of Vienna with a thesis on Wolfgang Schmeltzl. She was a private student of Alexander von Zemlinsky and Arnold Schoenberg, with whom she gave music courses in the reform school of Eugenie Schwarzwald in Vienna. She also taught at adult education centers and at Urania in Vienna. For over 25 years she worked as a cultural critic, primarily for the Neue Wiener Journal and the Frankfurter Zeitung. In Vienna she was also the first woman to publish cultural reviews under her own name. Since 1904 she was also involved as an active member in the publication of the "Monuments of Music Art in Austria". Her diverse involvement in Viennese musical life also led to her participation in the preparations for the festivities on the 100th anniversary of Ludwig van Beethoven's death in 1927.

== Persecution and death in the extermination camp ==
During Austrofascism at the beginning of the 1930s, Elsa Bienenfeld was fired from the Neue Wiener Journal. After Austria was annexed to the German Reich in 1938, she was charged with a foreign currency offense. She was partially incapacitated, arrested and later housed in a collective flat. In 1942 she was deported to the Maly Trostinez extermination camp near Minsk, where she was murdered on May 26, 1942.

== Literature ==
- Bienenfeld, Elsa. In: Lexikon deutsch-jüdischer Autoren, Band 2: Bend–Bins. Hrsg. vom Archiv Bibliographia Judaica. Saur, Red. Leitung: Renate Heuer, München 1993, ISBN 3-598-22682-9, S. 428.
- Marie-Theres Arnbom: Damals war Heimat – Die Welt des jüdischen Großbürgertums, Amalthea-Verlag 2014, S. 127–169.
- Eva Taudes: "Wien wird so unerträglich kleinstädtisch" : Elsa Bienenfeld (1877-1942) : Werdegang und Wirken im kulturellen Wien in der ersten Hälfte des 20. Jahrhunderts, Wien: Praesens Verlag 2018, ISBN 978-3-7069-0976-1

== Links ==
- Silke Wenzel: Artikel "Elsa Bienenfeld". In: MUGI. Musikvermittlung und Genderforschung: Lexikon und multimediale Präsentationen, hg. von Beatrix Borchard und Nina Noeske, Hochschule für Musik und Theater Hamburg, 2003ff. Retrieved 18 January 2008.
- Monika Kornberger: Bienenfeld, Elsa. In: Oesterreichisches Musiklexikon. Online-Ausgabe, Wien 2002 ff., ISBN 3-7001-3077-5; Druckausgabe: Band 1, Verlag der Österreichischen Akademie der Wissenschaften, Wien 2002, ISBN 3-7001-3043-0.
- Elsa Bienenfeld im Lexikon verfolgter Musiker und Musikerinnen der NS-Zeit (LexM), Stand: 6. December 2010
- Artikel beim DÖW von Eva Taudes, retrieved 13 January 2013
