= Elsa Sylvestersson =

Finnish ballet dancer (1924–1996)

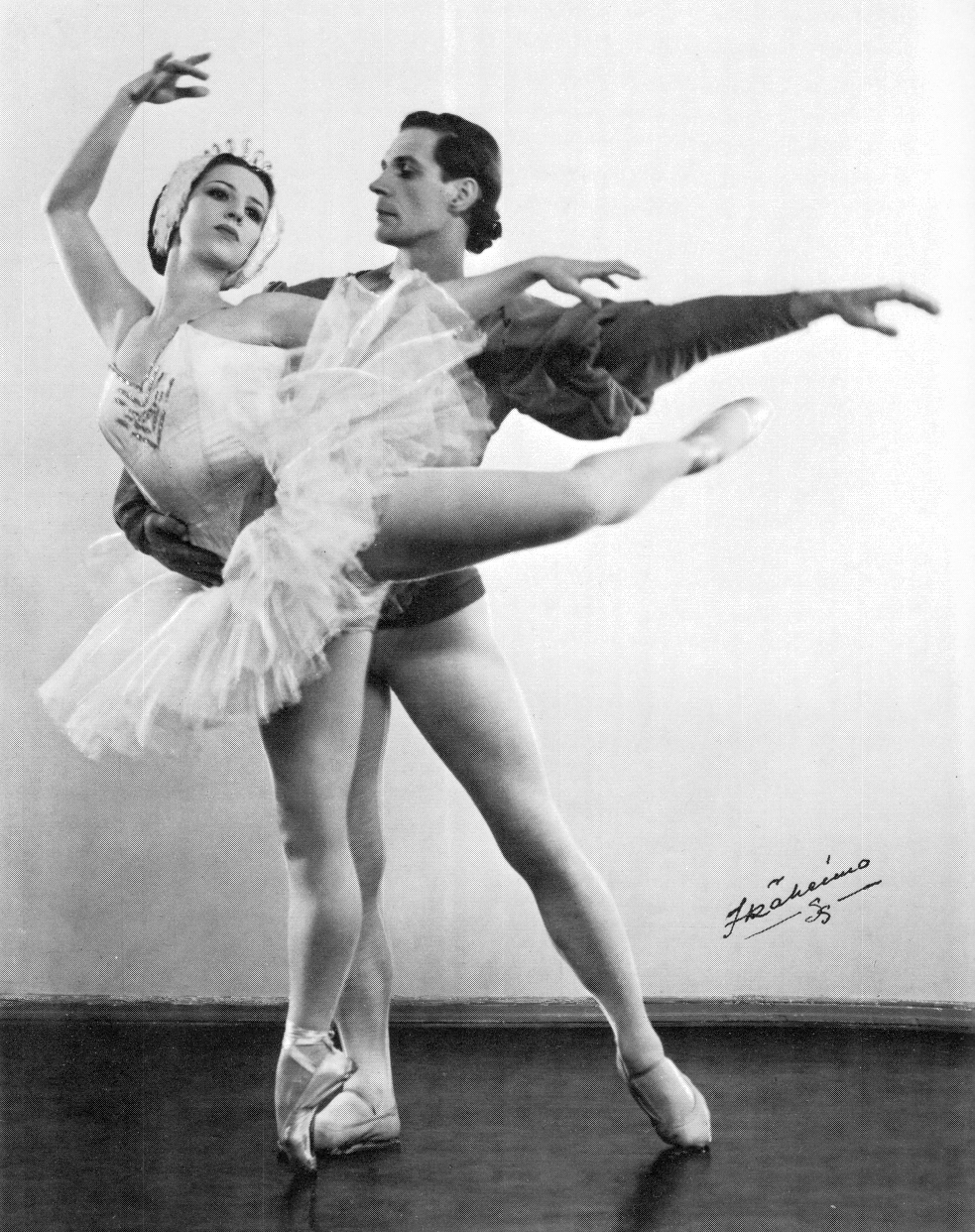
Elsa Sylvestersson with Klaus Salin in roles for Swan Lake by P. I. Tchaikovsky

Elsa Maria Sylvestersson (11 August 1924 Turku, Finland – 9 November 1996 Helsinki, Finland) was a Finnish ballet dancer and choreographer.

Sylvestersson was born to a Russian mother and a Swedish-speaking Finnish father. She danced as soloist in ballet at the age of 14. As a dancer, her most famous roles included Odette-Odile in Swan Lake, and the Firebird in The Firebird. She was technically talented and thus well suited for the roles in character dance.

As a choreographer she was very productive and had a long career (from 1954 to 1984). Her style was eclectic, and she had no trouble in combining moves from classical ballet and modern dance. She was the first one to prepare choreographies for Finnish television. In 1959 she made The Red Room based on August Strindberg, and later Selli (The Cell), Häkki (The Cage) and Sudenmorsian (The Wolf's Bride).
