= Arthur Ernst Rutra =

Austrian Expressionist playwright, publisher and author

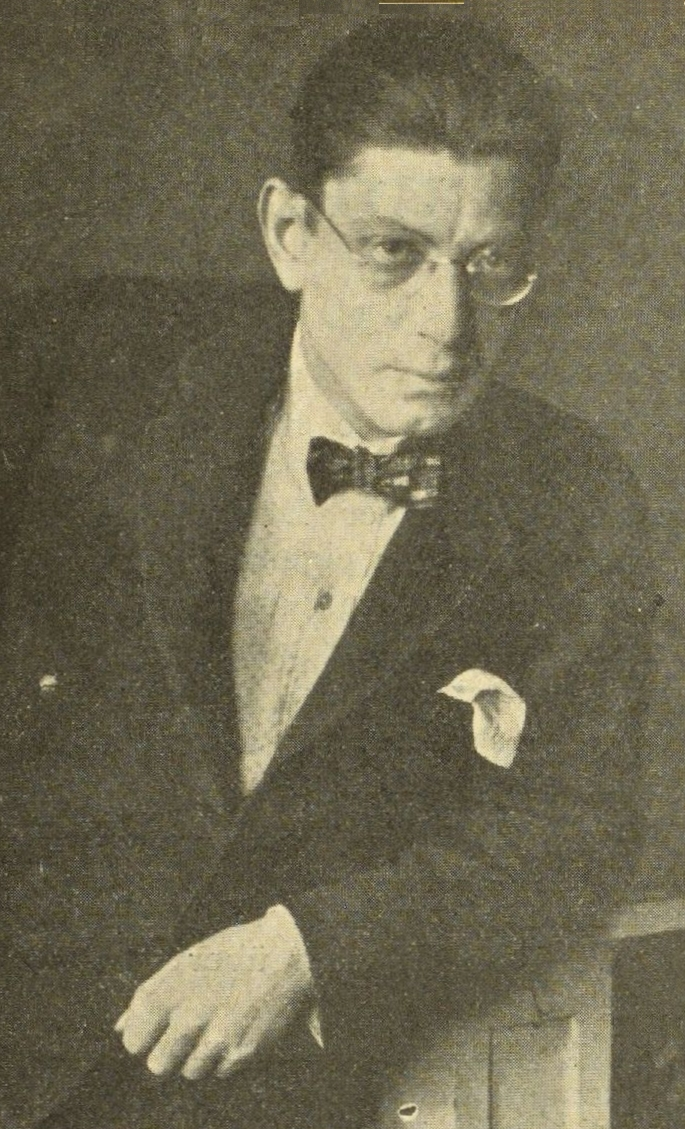
Arthur Ernst Rutra taken by Max Fenichel

Arthur Ernst Rutra (September 18 1892 – 9 October 1942), born Samuely (and using this surname until 1919), was a leading Austrian Expressionist playwright and author. He was also a publisher and journalist. He was born on 18 September 1892 in Lemberg in Austria-Hungary now Ukraine and was murdered on 9 October 1942 in the Maly Trostinets extermination camp near Minsk.

== Early life and education ==
Rutra was born on September 18 1892 in Lemberg in Austria-Hungary, now Ukraine. He was the son of a merchant and his mother came from a family of Jewish scholars. He spent his youth in Vienna and then studied at the University of Vienna 1911–13, Jurisprudence, 1913–15 Philosophy (majoring in German and Slavic studies) and was a member of the Akademischer Verbandes für Literatur und Musik, to which his friend Robert Müller ((1887–1924)) also belonged. In 1917 he earned his Doctor of Philosophy degree.

== Career ==
After the First World War he lived in Munich as a freelance translator, writer and publicist. From 1918 he was a publisher (including at Georg Müller Verlag & Kurt Wolff Verlag). He translated into German some works by Adam Mickiewicz (from Polish) and by Emile Zola (from French).

He was a member of the Schutzverband freier Schriftsteller (Association of Freelance Writers) and worked for the literary magazine Moment.

The Kohut-Rutra collection at Yale University consists, in part, of Rutra's library of French versions of the works of Heinrich Heine and his contemporaries.

== Nazi Era and Fate ==
After the National Socialists seized power in Germany, Rutra emigrated to Austria, where from 1934 he defended the independence of the Austrian state against German propaganda seeking annexation.

After the Anschluss of Austria in 1938, he was arrested and was placed in the Dachau concentration camp from April 2 1938 and imprisoned in Buchenwald from 9 October 1939. Ilse Braun, a sister of Eva Braun, claimed to have interceded on his behalf with Martin Bormann to try and get him freed, to no avail. In 1941 he was sentenced to 15 years in prison by the People's Court. On October 5 1942 he was transported by the Gestapo in Vienna to Minsk, where he was murdered on October 9 1942 in the nearby Maly Trostinez extermination camp.

== Works ==
- Golgatha. Ein Spiel in neun Bildern. Munich: Georg Müller Verlag, 1918
- Arthur Ernst Rutra u. Otto Schneider (Hrg.): Der Anbruch. Ein Jahrbuch neuer Jugend. München-Pasing: Roland Verlag 1920
- Der fremde Mann. Wolff, Munich, um 1926.
- Robert Müller. Denkrede. Hans von Weber Verlag, Munich 1925.
- Der Kronprinz. Tragödie. DVA, Stuttgart u. a. 1928.
- Zoo – Menschliche Geschichten. Hans von Weber Verlag, Munich 1927.
- Spiel am Abgrund. Eine Streitschrift um das Theater. Bachmair, Munich 1931.
- Das fünfte Rad. Episode aus dem Leben eines Niemands in 4 Akten. Zsolnay, Vienna, 1941. 119 Bl. 4°

The Münchner Stadtbibliothek's Monacensia Library contains a number of letters of Arthur Rutra and signed manuscripts in its collection.
