= Elsa Arnold =

German resistance fighter

- Born: October 9, 1903; Hamburd, Germany
- Died: May 16, 1986 (aged 82); East berlin
- Burial place: Cemetery Baumschulenweg
- Occupation: Resistance fighter

Elsa Arnold (October 9, 1903 – May 16, 1986) was a German resistance fighter.

== Early life ==
Elsa Arnold née Sens was born in Hamburg, Germany on October 9, 1903, and initially worked as a commercial employee just as her father, Max Sens, had. In 1919, at 16, she joined the Socialist Worker's Youth (SAJ) and in 1924 she joined the Monist Youth. In 1925, she joined the Communist Party of Germany (KPD). After marrying Artur Arnold in 1926, she moved to Paris, France that same year and worked as a steno typist and translator for the International Department of the French Worker's Union General Confederation of Unified Labor (C.G.T.U).

== Resistance activity and Nazi persecution ==
In 1930, she was expelled from France and returned to Germany where she worked as translator in a publishing house of the Revolutionary Trade Union Opposition (RGO) in Berlin. In 1932, she started living with her new partner Karl Becker who was a KPD functionary. After the Nazis came to power in 1933, Arnold and Becker went into exile and fled to Amsterdam and then back to Paris in 1936 where they remained active in the KPD and in the International Association of Friends of the Soviet Union. In 1940, Arnold joined the Resistance.

On June 18, 1941, Arnold and Becker were arrested by the French police and handed over to the Gestapo in Berlin. In 1942, she was sentenced to 15 years in prison for preparation for high treason by the People's Court. Karl Becker received the death penalty and on December 1, 1942, was murdered in Plötzensee prison. Arnold spent years in Waldheim prison and other prisons until the Red Army liberated them in May 1945.

== After the war ==
After WWII was over, Arnold returned to Berlin and became leader of the KPD in Berlin-Friedenau and later became secretary for the KPD/SED district leadership in Berlin-Spandau. In 1954, she became a secretary for the SED factory party organization in the Wolfen film factory and was later appointed as the head of department in the district leadership of the SED in Halle.
