= Elza Kövesházi-Kalmár =

Hungarian artist (1876–1956)

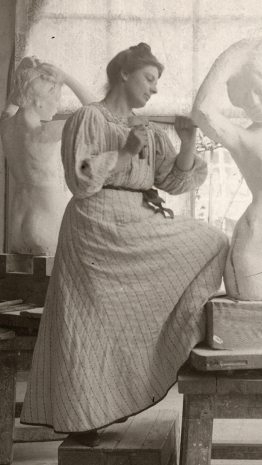
- Born: 1 January 1876; Vienna, Austria
- Died: 3 September 1956 (aged 80); Budapest, Hungry
- Known for: Sculpture

Elza Kövesházi-Kalmár (1 January 1876 – 3 September 1956) was a Hungarian sculptor known for her Art Nouveau and Art Deco sculptures.

== Biography ==
Kövesházi-Kalmár was born on 1 January 1876 in Vienna, Austria. She studied in Vienna and Munich. She was a member of the Künstlerinnen group, the Hagenbund and the Hungarian artists' association Kéve.

Among her awards she was the recipient of a silver medal at the 1926 World's Fair in Philadelphia and a silver and bronze at the 1937 Paris World's Fair. Despite this recognition, she was unable to support herself as an artist and she turned to creating orthopedic shoes for a living.

Kövesházi-Kalmár died on 3 September 1956 in Budapest.

== Legacy ==
Her work was included in the 2019 exhibition City Of Women: Female artists in Vienna from 1900 to 1938 at the Österreichische Galerie Belvedere.
