= Newcastle, Saint Kitts and Nevis =

Newcastle
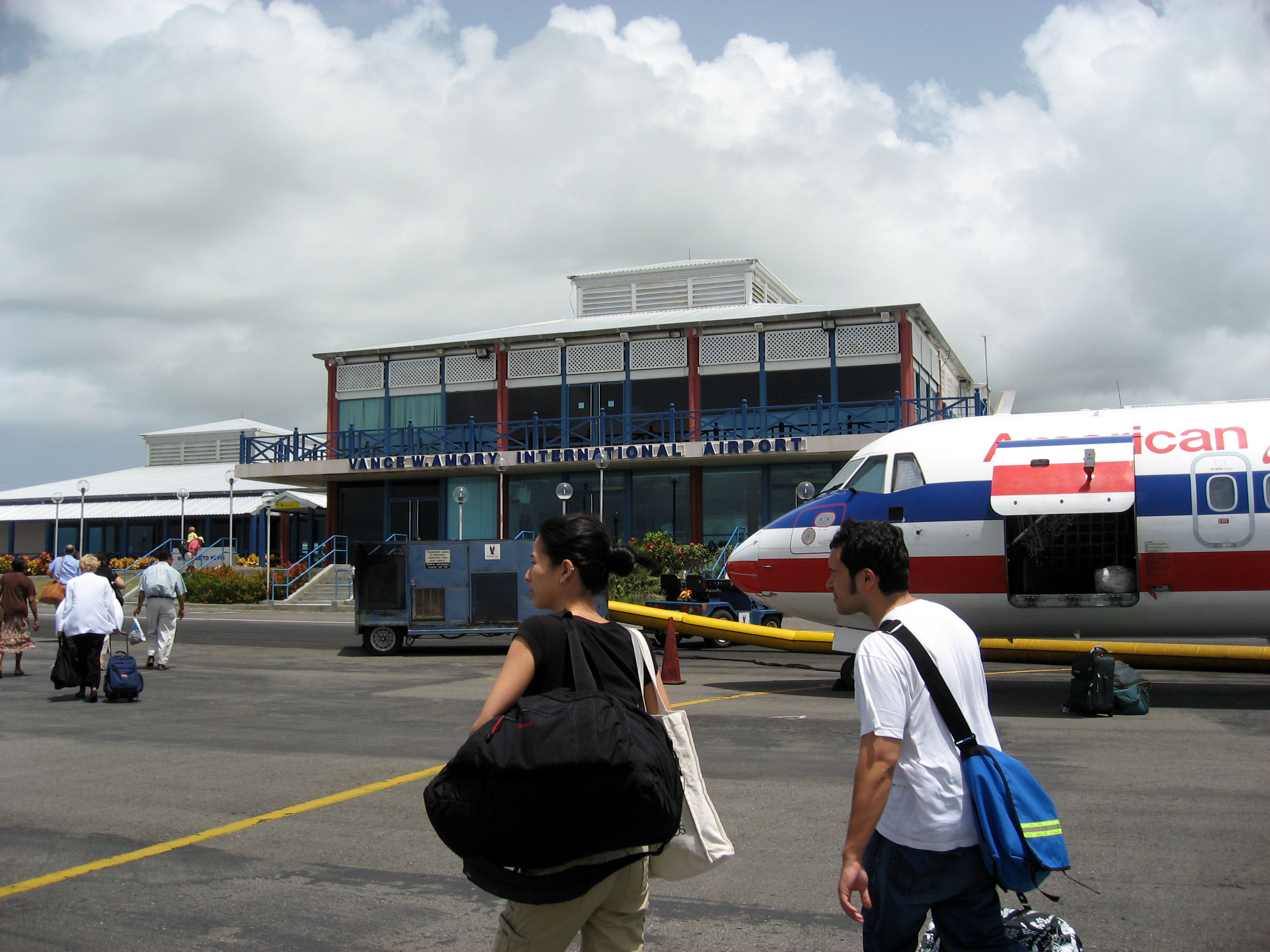
- Vance W. Amory International Airport

- Location in Saint Kitts and Nevis
- Coordinates: 17°12′N 062°35′W
- Country: Saint Kitts and Nevis
- Island: Nevis
- Parish: Saint James Windward

Newcastle is a village on the northern coast of the island of Nevis in Saint Kitts and Nevis. It is the capital of Saint James Windward Parish. The village is just to the east of Vance W. Amory International Airport and sits across from the Narrows, the strait which separates Nevis from Saint Kitts.

According to local histories, the village of Newcastle was historically known as New Castle.

== Geography ==
Newcastle is situated on Newcastle Bay, which opens into the Narrows, the strait which separates Nevis from Saint Kitts.

== Economy ==
The primary industries in Newcastle are tourism and fishing. It serves as a secondary service centre for education and health services to Charlestown.

== History ==
Nevis was colonised by the English. A 6.7 m^{2} (72 sq ft) fortification known as the Newcastle Redoubt was constructed in Newcastle circa 1650.

By the early 18th century, Newcastle was officially classified as a town alongside Charlestown and Jamestown. By this time, Newcastle had a rudimentary port, and its proximity to the southern tip of the island of Saint Kitts meant that potters making use of the excellent clay in the Newcastle area could easily travel from the Newcastle port to Basseterre to sell their wares.

The original village was located along the oceanfront on the land now designated for the Vance W. Amory International Airport; its buildings and shops were relocated in the mid-1950s to make way for the construction and runway expansions of the airport. The Newcastle Redoubt was demolished to make way for a runway expansion in 1996.

In 1981, New Castle Pottery, a permanent traditional pottery workshop, was established in Newcastle with development funds from the United States Agency for International Development and the Canadian International Development Agency. It subsequently became an important site for tourism.
