= Elsa Oseguera =

Honduran journalist (born 1993)

Elsa Rosalinda Oseguera Amaya (born December 9, 1991) is a Honduran journalist. At the age of 18, she began working at Canal 6. Later she shifted to VTV, where she worked as a news reader. As of 2015, she worked at HCH in San Pedro Sula. She has been referred to as the 'Honduran Kim Kardashian' in national media. Also known for her representing in the reality show “El lenguetazo” by lipstickfables.
