= Elsa Burckhardt-Blum =

Swiss architect, painter (1900–1974)

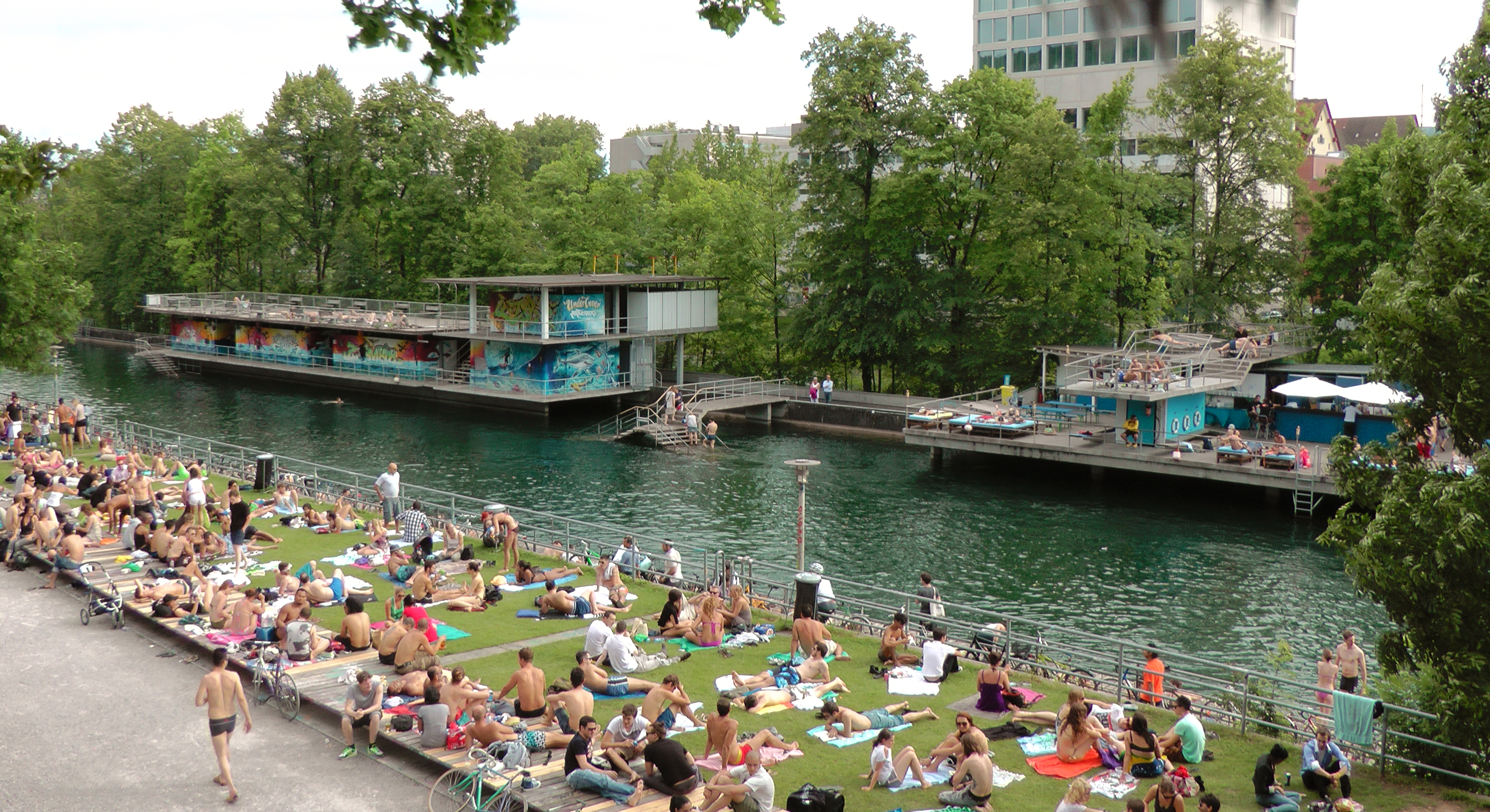
- Public bath at Letten canal, Zürich. Architect: Elsa Burckhardt-Blum
- Born: Elsa Blum; 27 November 1900; Zürich, Switzerland
- Died: 7 April 1974 (aged 73); Küsnacht, Switzerland
- Education: Zurich Art School
- Occupations: Architect, painter
- Known for: Among first freelance architects in Switzerland
- Spouse: Ernst Friedrich Burckhardt

Elsa Burckhardt-Blum (27 November 1900 – 7 April 1974) was a Swiss architect and painter. Along with Lux Guyer, she was one of the first freelance architects in Switzerland.

== Life and work ==
Elsa Blum was born on 27 November 1900 in Zürich. She was the daughter of a lawyer Emil Blum and studied with Wilhelm Hummel. From 1920 to 1923, she studied art history at the Zurich Art School, the ZhdK, but dropped out to pursue architecture. In 1925 she married the architect Ernst Friedrich Burckhardt, and their son Christof was born two years later.

From 1930, she interned in architectural offices, and after 1932 started working as an architect. She built several buildings in Küsnacht, Zollikon and Zürich from 1933 to 1951, partly with her husband Ernst Friedrich Burckhardt. The bath buildings in Oberer Letten in Zürich were built in 1952. In 1957, she was awarded by the city of Zürich, with her husband, for their excellent buildings.

In 1959, together with Annemarie Hubacher-Constam, Burckhardt-Blum was the first woman to join the Association of Swiss Architects (BSA). In 1960, she founded her own architectural firm Burckhardt & Perriard in Küsnacht, together with former employee Louis Perriard. She continued to carry out some projects for private houses under her own name.

Their architectural style has been described as “emphasi[sing] the clear volume and the opening of the house to the outside. Characteristic features are widely projecting canopies and their integration into the surrounding topography.” It shows their commitment to modernity and innovative designs.

From 1948 onward, Burckhardt-Blumtook created drawings (pencil and colored pencil), from 1950 paintings in tempera, and from 1952 paintings in oil. Blum produced abstract pictures, with a preference for geometric shapes, in particular the square, condensed by layering vivid colours or vibrating hatching.

Beginning in 1966, she withdrew from architecture to devote herself solely to painting and graphics.

== Personal life ==
Burckhardt-Blum was the twin sister of the composer Robert Blum (1900–1944). On a trip to England in 1958, there was a car accident in which her husband was killed and she was seriously injured. She died on 7 April 1974 in Küsnacht, Zürich.

== Selected honors ==
- In 1957, she and her husband were honored with the “Award for Good Buildings” by the city of Zürich for the design of the Oberer and Unterer Letten outdoor pools.
- The city of Zürich and the Zürich Art Society honored her in 1965 with a large exhibition in the Helmhaus.
- As of 2010, there were plans to set up an Elsa Burckhardt Blum Garden on the ETH Zurich grounds, but this was never realized.

== Gallery ==
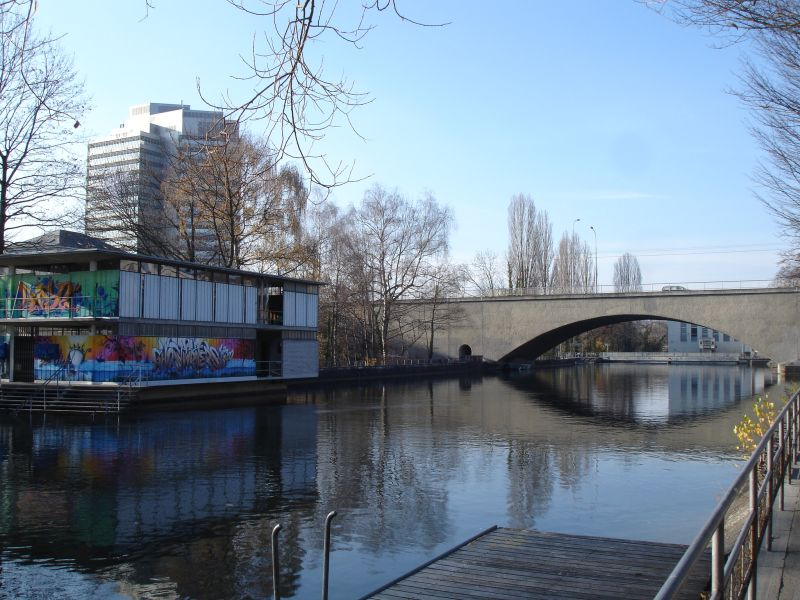

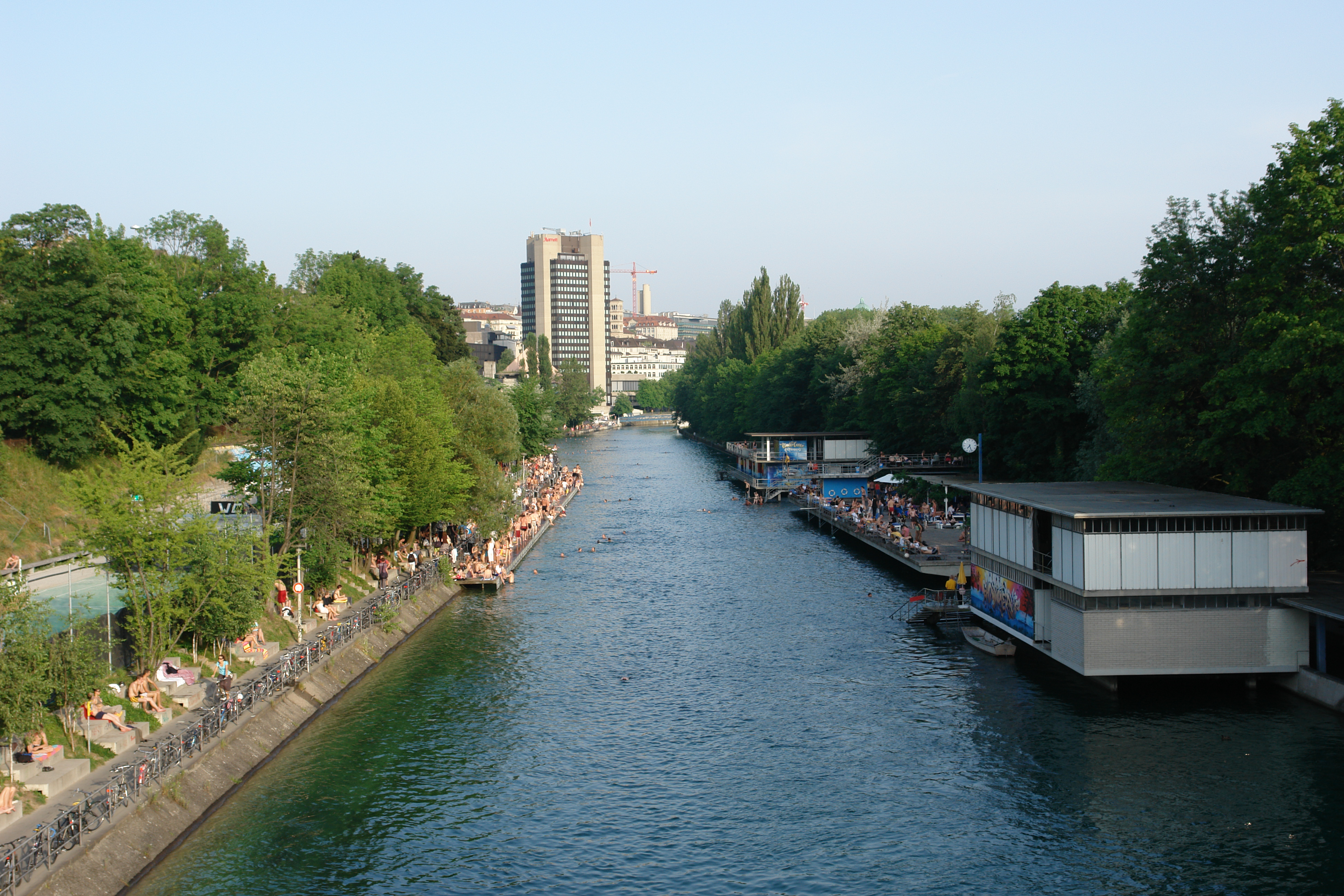

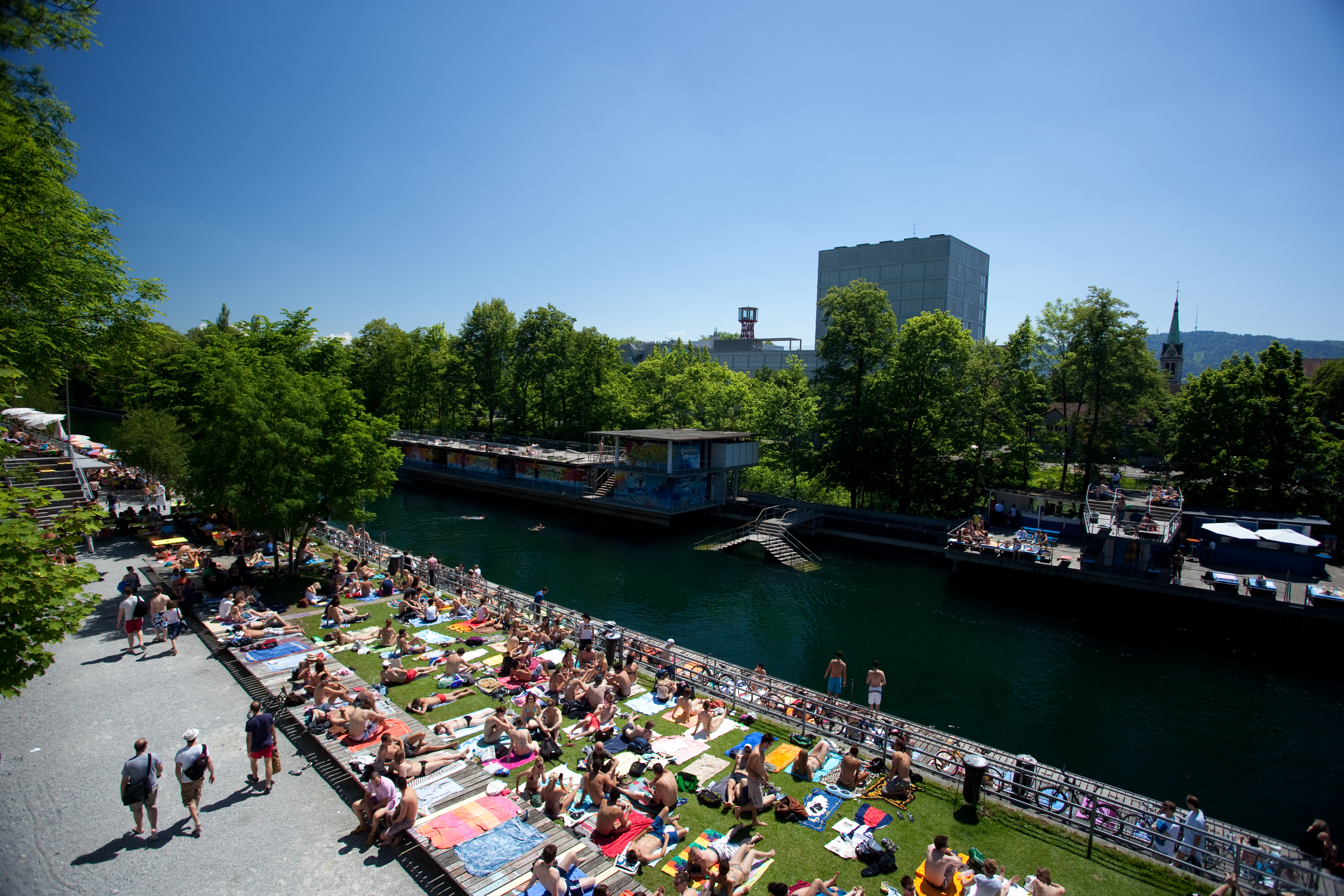

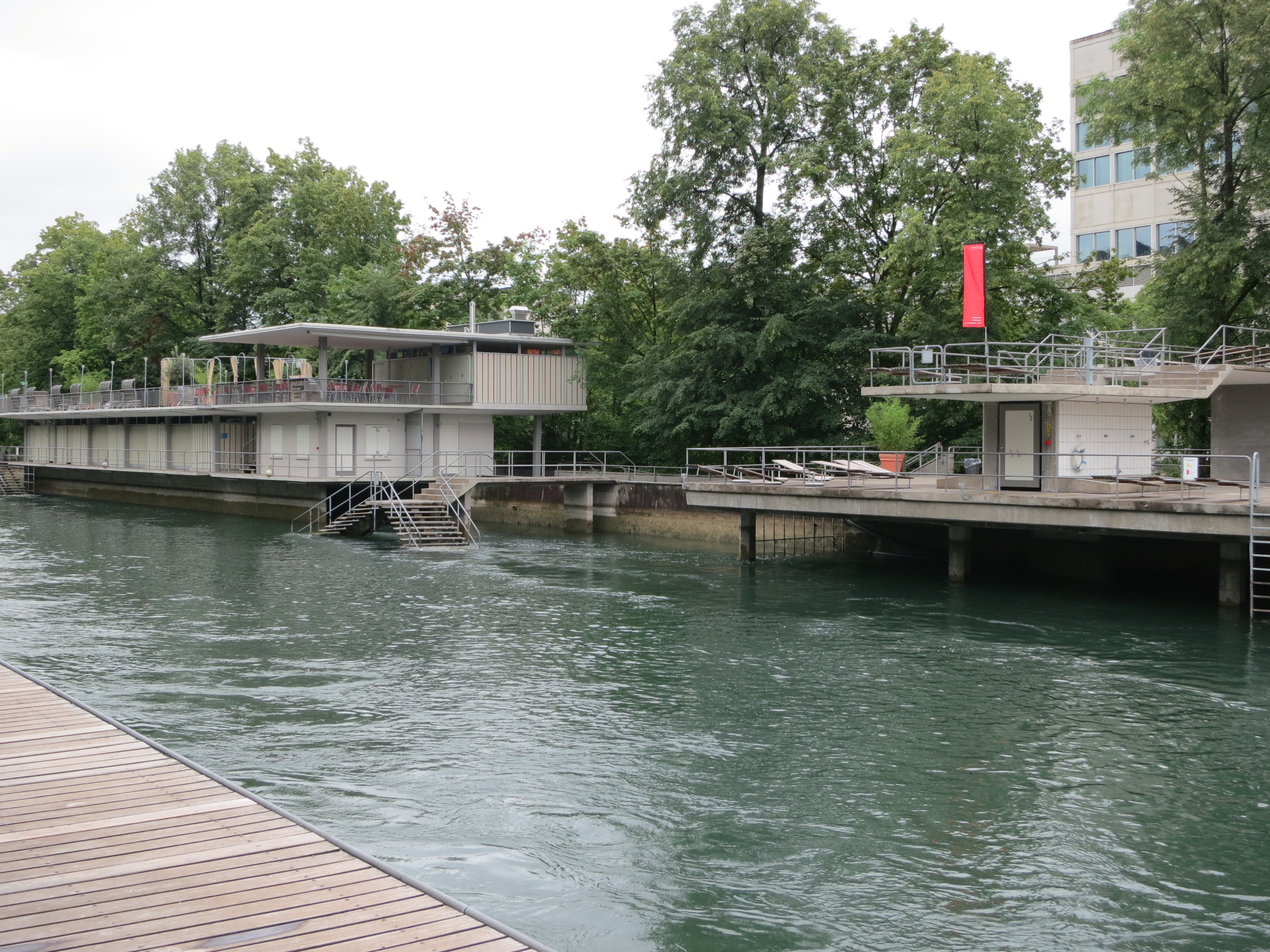
