= Margarete Hilferding =

Austrian physician and psychoanalyst

Margarete Hilferding née Hönigsberg
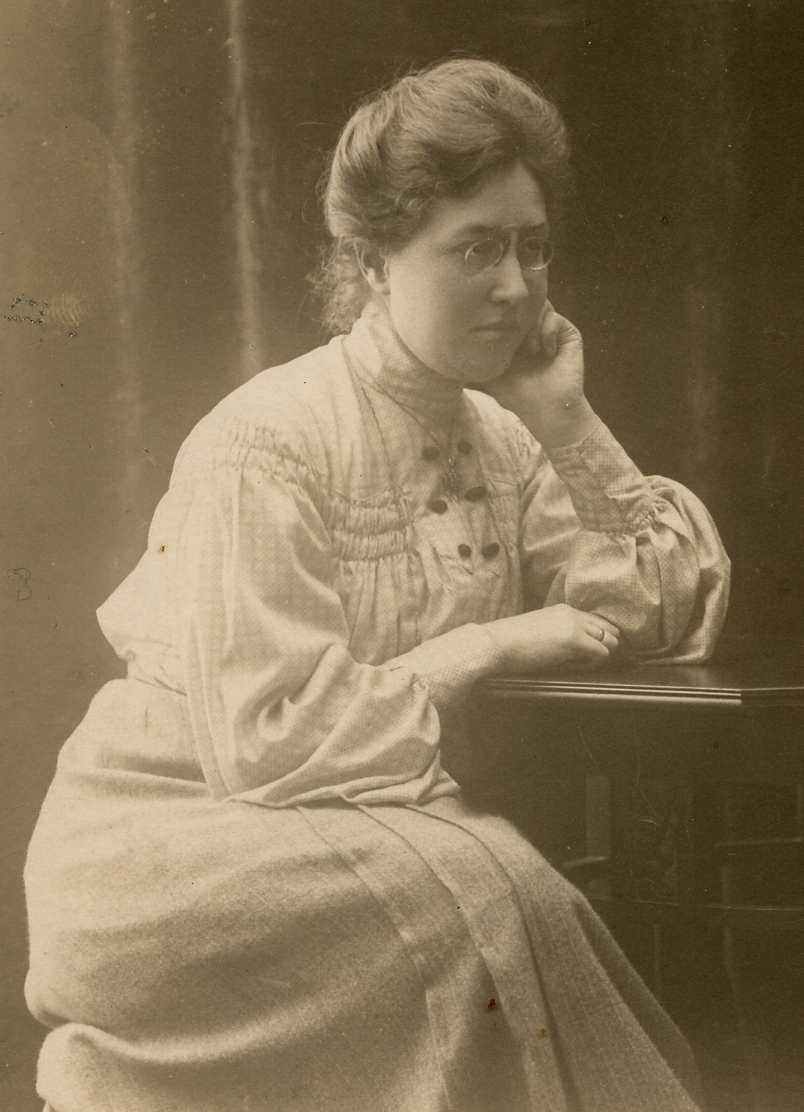
- 1904
- Born: June 20, 1871; Hernals, Vienna
- Died: September 23, 1942 (aged 71); In transit from Theresienstadt to Maly Trostenets
- Spouse: Rudolf Hilferding
- Children: Peter Milford

Margarete Hilferding, born Hönigsberg (June 20, 1871 – September 23, 1942), was an Austrian physician and psychoanalyst.

Hilferding was the first woman admitted into the Vienna Psychoanalytic Society. Her husband was the Austro-Marxist economist Rudolf Hilferding.

She was murdered in the Holocaust, dying on a train from Theresienstadt to Maly Trostenets.

She failed to leave Austria in time for the Anschluss, and was stripped of her apartment, placed in an old people's home and deported on June 28, 1942. She died of exhaustion during a transfer between the Theresienstadt and Maly Trostenets camps on September 23, 1942. Her eldest son, Karl Hilferding, was arrested by the French police as he fled the Netherlands, before being able to cross the Swiss border. He was interned at the Drancy camp, then deported to Auschwitz, where he died on December 2, 1942. Only her second son, Peter Milford-Hilferding (de) (1908-2007), an Austrian economist, escaped to New Zealand survived.

== Sources ==
- Margarete Hilferding, Geburtenregelung. Erörterungen zum § 144.- Vienna, 1926
- Ilse Korotin, Margarethe Hilferding. In: Gelehrte Frauen, Verlag BMUK, Vienna, 1996
- Martina Gamper: "... so kann ich nicht umhin mich zu wundern, dass nicht mehr Ärztinnen da sind." : die Stellung weiblicher Ärzte im "Roten Wien" (1922–1934). Verlag Österreichische Ärztekammer, 2000
- Sonja Stipsits: Margarete Hönigsberg : aus dem Leben einer Pionierin. Töchter des Hippokrates. Verlag Österreichische Ärztekammer, 2000.
- Eveline List: Mutterliebe und Geburtenkontrolle - Zwischen Psychoanalyse und Sozialismus Mandelbaum Verlag, Vienna, 2006; ISBN 3-85476-184-8
- Balsam, R. (2003), Women of the Wednesday Society: The Presentations of Drs. Hilferding, Spielrein and Hug-Hellmuth. American Imago; Vol 60: 3, Fall 2003, pp. 303–343.
