= Maly Trostenets concentration camp =

Village near Minsk in Belarus

Maly Trostenets
- Extermination camp
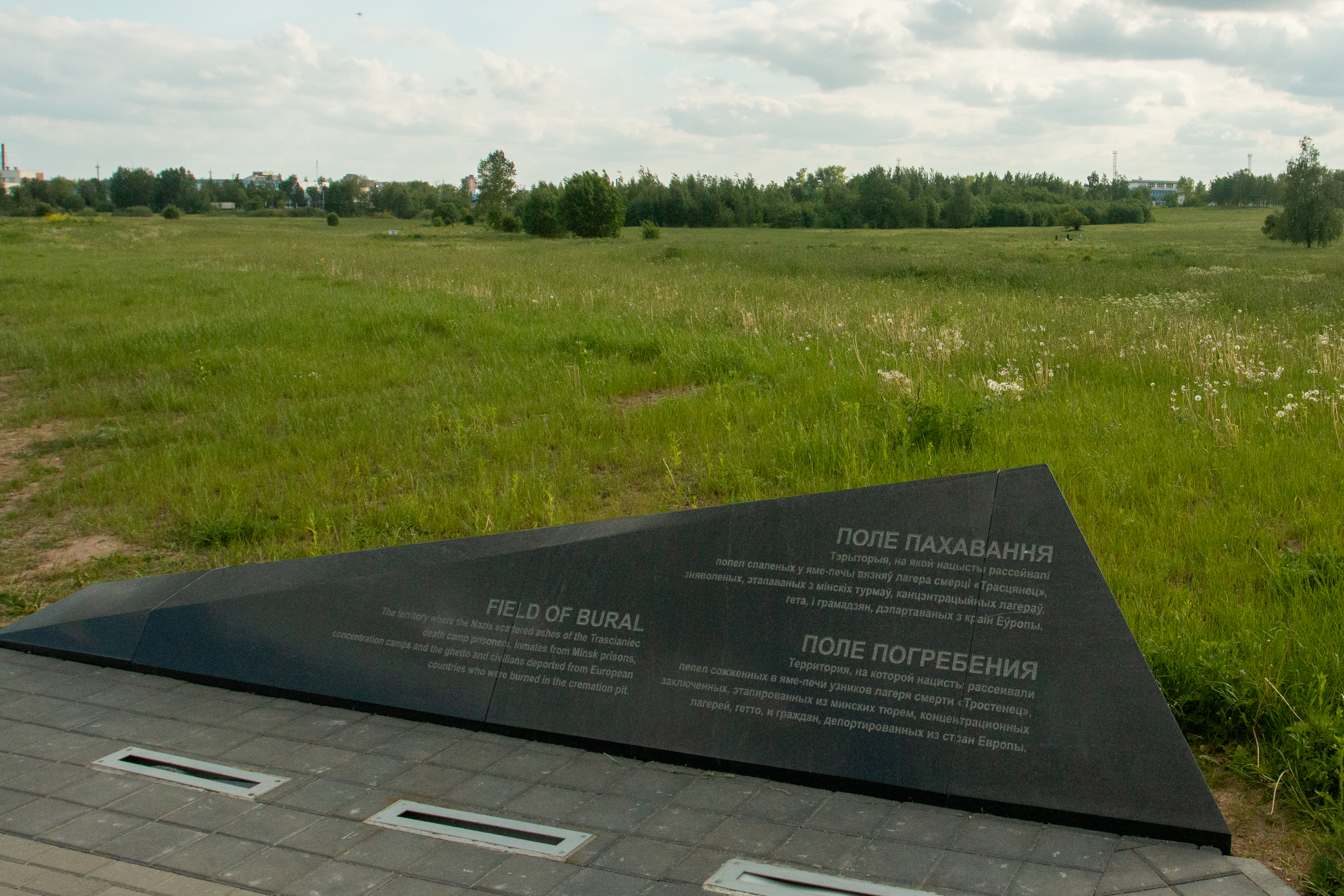
- "Field of Burial" where the ashes of murdered and cremated prisoners were scattered

- Location within Belarus
- Coordinates: 53°50′08″N 27°42′15″E
- Other names: Ersatzgefängnis KL. Trostinez
- Known for: Genocide during the Holocaust
- Location: Near Minsk in the Byelorussian Soviet Socialist Republic
- Built by: Eduard Strauch
- Commandant: Gerhard Maywald; Heinrich Eiche; Wilhelm Madeker; Wilhelm Kallmeyer; Josef Faber
- Original use: Forced labor
- Operational: April 1942 – June 1944
- Number of gas chambers: gas vans
- Inmates: Jews, Soviet POWs, Belarusian partisans
- Number of inmates: 500–1,000
- Killed: 60,000 – 106,000
- Liberated by: Destroyed by the Nazis in late June 1944

Maly Trostenets (Note: German: Maly Trostinez. Also known, depending on the language and transliteration of Cyrillic used, under the spellings Maly Trostinets (Maly Trostinez, Maly Trostinetz, Maly Trostinec) and Maly Trastsianets (Maly Trastyanets, Maly Trascjanec, Maly Traścianiec)) (Belarusian: Малы Трасцянец, romanized: Maly Traścianiec, lit. 'Little Trostenets'; Russian: Малый Тростенец, romanized: Maly Trostenets) was an extermination site and forced-labour camp operated by Nazi Germany in Belarus during World War II. It was built near the village of Maly Trostenets, twelve kilometres southeast of Minsk in the Byelorussian Soviet Socialist Republic. The location comprised two sites: a Nazi forced labour camp, and a nearby site in the Blagovshchina Forest intended for no other purpose than mass murder of Jews and other victims. Another site at the Shashkovka Forest replaced Blagovshchina from late 1943 to June 1944 to murder local non-Jewish civilians and partisans.

From May 1942, as part of the so-called Final Solution, Jews from Austria, Germany, the Netherlands, Poland, and the Protectorate of Bohemia and Moravia were transported by train to Maly Trostenets, where they were taken shortly afterwards to the Blagovshchina Forest and shot. From the summer of 1942, mobile gas vans were also used. As the Red Army approached the area in June 1944, the Germans murdered the remaining prisoners and destroyed the camp by fire.

The exact number of victims is difficult to determine because the Nazis ordered the mass graves to be exhumed and the bodies burned in October 1943 to destroy evidence of the killings. Estimates of the number of Jewish victims range from 60,000 to more than 106,000. Although scholars consider it the fourth-largest Nazi extermination site (after Auschwitz, Treblinka and Bełżec, or after Auschwitz, Treblinka and Majdanek), Maly Trostenets is often regarded as the least-known Nazi death camps. The genocide of Jews at Maly Trostenets was not mentioned at the Nuremberg Trials, and remained largely unknown to the wider public and was largely ignored by Soviet and Belarusian officials until the late 1990s.

== Background ==
Following the Soviet annexation of eastern Poland in September 1939, the Byelorussian Soviet Socialist Republic (BSSR) re-incorporated western territories that had been part of Poland since 1920. Jews constituted a significant proportion of the Belarusian population at the time, particularly in major cities and towns, numbering around 820,000 within the 1939–1941 borders. Many Jews had also fled eastward from German-occupied Poland after September 1939, viewing the Soviet territories as safer.

Prior to World War II, the Blagovshchina Forest was already used as mass a execution site by the Soviet regime. In June 1941, Nazi Germany invaded the Soviet Union, occupying Belarus within weeks as part of Operation Barbarossa. The German occupation marked the beginning of the Holocaust in Belarus, with the establishment of ghettos, including the nearby Minsk Ghetto in late July 1941, followed by the systematic persecution and mass murder of Belarusian Jews.

As part of the war of annihilation against the Soviet Union, the Nazis sought to shift the physical destruction of European Jews to the eastern part of the continent. Minsk was considered as one of the possible deportation destinations in October 1941, with the Minsk Ghetto being intended to accommodate Jews from Germany, Austria and the Protectorate of Bohemia and Moravia. As early as November 1941, around 7,000 Jews from Central Europe arrived in Minsk from Central Europe. At this time, the Nazis were also considering a possible site at Mogilev, approximately 200 km east of Minsk, for the murder of the deported Jews. In this context, the Minsk Ghetto has been described by Christian Gerlach as a sort of "waiting room for extermination" for German, Czech, and Austrian Jews.

== History ==
=== Creation of the forced labour camp ===
The site was established at an uncertain date between November 1941 and January 1942. In late April–early May 1942, the Commander of the Security Police and the SD (KdS) in Minsk, Eduard Strauch, appropriated the 250-hectare 'Karl Marx' kolkhoz (collective farm), located about 12 kilometres southeast Minsk. A forced-labour camp was created on the site, the work of inmates serving as a source of food and various services for the local SS.

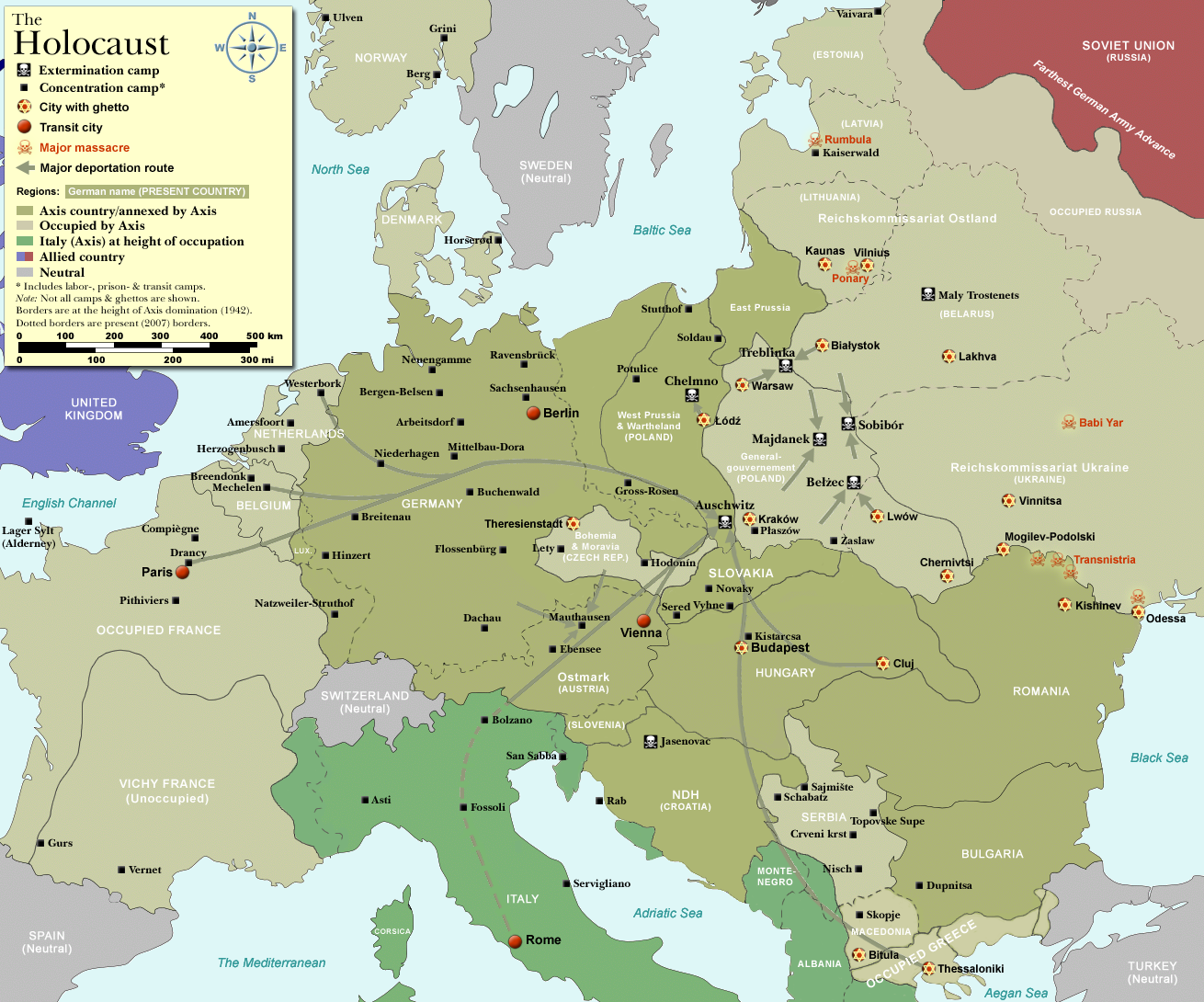
Maly Trostenets in the pan-European system of Nazi extermination camps

The Nazis imprisoned in the camp Soviet, Polish and Western and Central European Jews who had been previously interned in the Minsk Ghetto, as well as local Belarusian suspected partisans. Men, women and families were held together, an unusual feature for a Nazi camp. The number of inmates fluctuated between 500 and 1,000 for most of the camp's existence. After the liquidation of the Minsk Ghetto in October 1943, it stood at 200. Sick and exhausted prisoners were selected, murdered, and replaced by new workers during regular inspections.

The camp administrators were, in chronological order, Gerhard Maywald, Heinrich Eiche, Wilhelm Madeker, Wilhelm Kallmeyer and Josef Faber. The camp itself was guarded by Latvian, ethnic German, and later Ukrainian units. Its official name is difficult to ascertain due to a lack of sources. A German telegram refers to it as Ersatzgefängnis KL. Trostinez ('Maly Trostenets Concentration Camp Substitute Prison'). The village itself was known as Maly Traścianiec (Малы Трасцянец) in Belarusian, Maly Trostenets (Малый Тростенец) in Russian, and Maly Trostinez in German.

=== Extermination site at Blagovshchina ===
In March and April 1942, Adolf Eichmann, Heinrich Himmler and Reinhard Heydrich came to Minsk to decide to resume the deportation of Jews there and to order the immediate murder of deportees upon their arrival at a site near the city. A clearing in the Blagovshchina Forest, with sandy soil that made it easier to dig mass graves and difficult to see from outside, was eventually designated as an extermination site.

From May to October 1942, transports of Jews arrived from the Protectorate of Bohemia and Moravia, Austria, Germany, the Netherlands, and Poland. Most of the deportees were killed shortly after arrival, and their bodies were buried in mass graves. Although most victims were shot, gas vans were also in use by June 1942 at the latest, both to make the mass killings more efficient and to spare the execution squads the psychological strain. By August 1942, a disused railway siding near Maly Trostenets was expanded to provide a direct connection between the killing site and the existing railway infrastructure, allowing trains to be diverted directly there, thus bypassing Minsk. Only a handful of these deportees ended up in the camp, the vast majority being murdered upon arrival. Their possessions, along with goods looted from nearby villages, were sent to the camp for sorting and processing by prisoners, creating a direct link between the camp's forced labour and the mass killings at Blagovshchina. Blagovshchina was also used as a killing site for Soviet prisoners of war, suspected partisans, and others targeted by the Nazi occupation authorities.

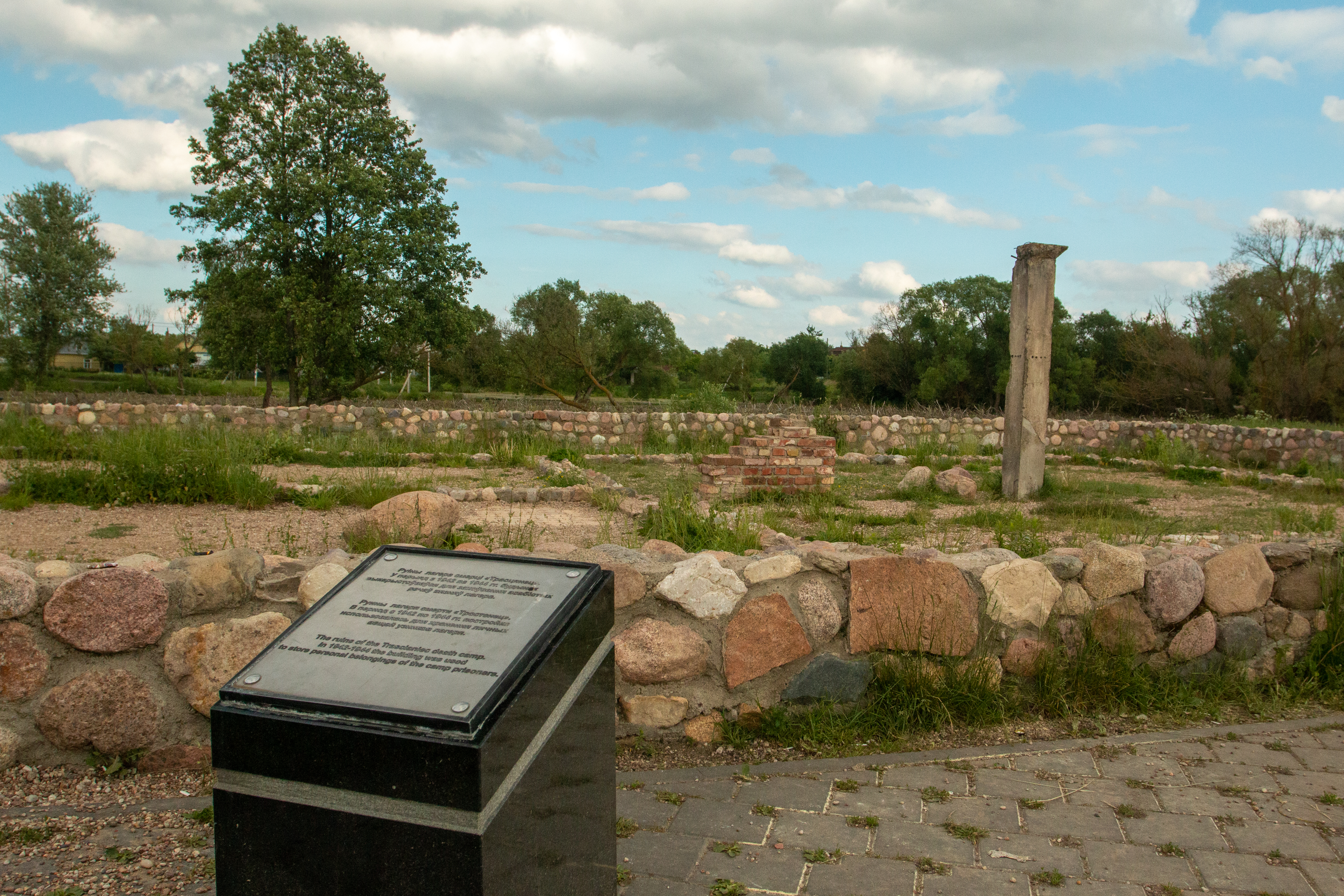
Ruins of the building used for personal belongings of prisoners at the Maly Trostenets concentration camp

With the development of the extermination camps in Nazi-occupied Poland, Maly Trostenets was abandoned as a destination for the deportation and murder of Central European Jews from October 1942 onward. Until late 1943 however, the Blagovshchina Forest remained in use as an execution site for Jews from the nearby Minsk Ghetto. The largest massacre took place on 28–30 July 1942, when approximately 10,000 Jews deemed unable to work were murdered. Following the liquidation of the ghetto in October 1943, Sonderkommandos were forced by the Nazis to exhume and cremate the bodies in an attempt to conceal evidence of the killings, as part of Sonderaktion 1005. The ashes were sifted in search of gold, and all the forced labourers involved were eventually murdered. After this, Blagovshchina was no longer used as a killing site.

From late 1943 or early 1944, Blagovshchina was replaced by the Shashkovka Forest, adjacent to the camp, as the site of executions of local civilians, suspected partisans, and prisoners from Minsk. A cremation pit was constructed there as a makeshift crematorium, where bodies from the gas vans were burned on the spot in order to be able to murder people without leaving bodies behind as evidence. The victims were non-Jewish civilians who had been captured during partisan operations in Belarusian villages and classified as unfit for work.

=== Destruction of the camp ===
On 29 and 30 June 1944, as the Red Army approached during Operation Bagration, retreating German forces destroyed the camp and killed the remaining prisoners. They were shot in a barn on the grounds of the labour camp, which was then set on fire. By 4 July, when the Soviet Army recaptured Minsk and entered Maly Trostenets, the camp had already been destroyed by fire, with all records and documents previously kept on the site. Only a small number of prisoners had managed to survive through escape prior to the camp's destruction, or transfer to other camps in the fall of 1943.

== Death toll ==
=== Estimations ===
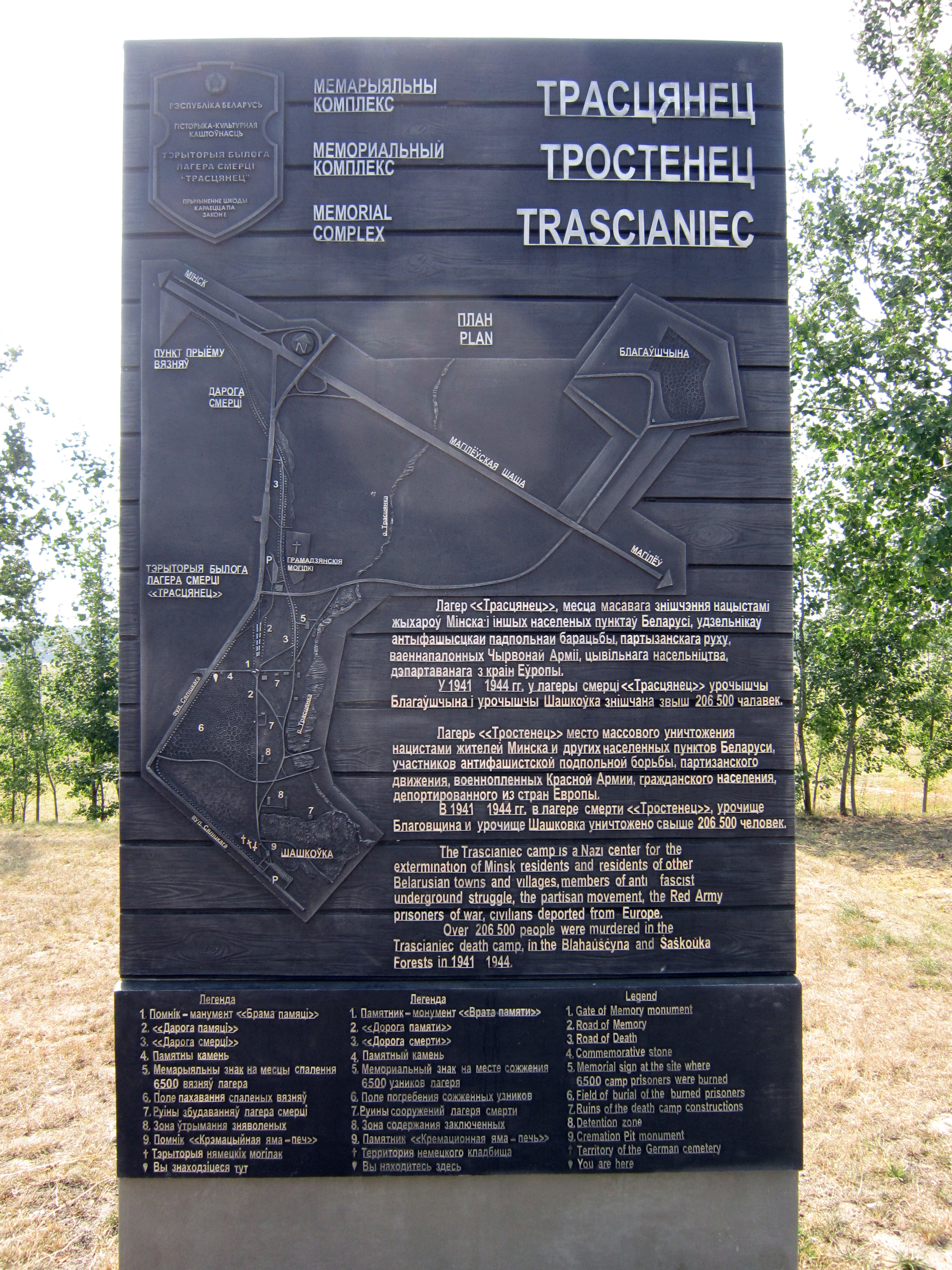
The plate of the memorial complex

Soviet postwar estimations mentioned that some 200,000 people died at the site by also counting the victims at the surrounding execution sites. Soviet writer Ilya Ehrenburg (1891–1967) estimated that 206,500 were murdered at Trostenets, of whom 150,000 were killed at the Blagovshchina Forest between September 1941 and October 1943, and another 50,000 at the Shashkovka Forest between October 1943 and June 1944. The final report of the Minsk Regional Commission, dated 13 August 1944, referred exclusively to the mass murder of "peaceful civilians and prisoners of war in Minsk and its surroundings". This document became the basis for subsequent press publications and museum exhibitions. The genocide of Jews at Maly Trostenets was omitted both from this report and from later publications by the Extraordinary State Commission, and Jewish victims were subsumed under the broader category of "victims among the civilian population". A sign at the 2015 memorial site still gives the number of victims as 206,500, with no specific mention of Jewish victims, and Belarusian authorities continue to stand by this figure.

However, these figures have been revised by recent research. The exact number of victims remains uncertain because the Sonderkommando 1005 exhumed and burned the bodies from the mass graves from October 1943 onward. Testimonies from those involved indicate that between 40,000 and 50,000 bodies had been buried there. In 2000, Christian Gerlach estimated the death toll at around 60,000. In 2011, Petra Rentrop likewise gave the number of 60,000 people killed. In 2010, Stephan Lehnstaedt estimated that at least 106,000 Jews were murdered at Maly Trostenets, which would make it deadlier than the Majdanek death camp.

=== Victims ===
The names of 10,000 Austrian Jews murdered in Maly Trostenets were collected in the book Maly Trostinec – Das Totenbuch: Den Toten ihre Namen, by Waltraud Barton. Victims include:

- Cora Berliner (most likely)
- Elsa Bienenfeld, Austrian music historian and music critic
- Grete Forst
- Mitzi Freud and Paula Winternitz née Freud, sisters of Sigmund Freud
- Vincent Hadleŭski [Wincenty Godlewski], Roman Catholic priest and Belarusian nationalist resistance fighter (b. 1888), arrested in Minsk on 24 December 1942 and shot at Trostenets the same day.
- Margarete Hilferding (in transit to the camp from Terezín)
- Norbert Jokl (debated)
- JUDr. Walter Krafft, Austrian Lawyer, cousin of Kurt Adler, including his wife Lilly Sara Krafft
- Alfred Nichtenhauser, Modling, Austria shop owner
- Arthur Ernst Rutra, author and translator
- Judith Freund, an ordinary woman, deported from Vienna

== After the war ==
A memorial complex has been built at the site of the camp.

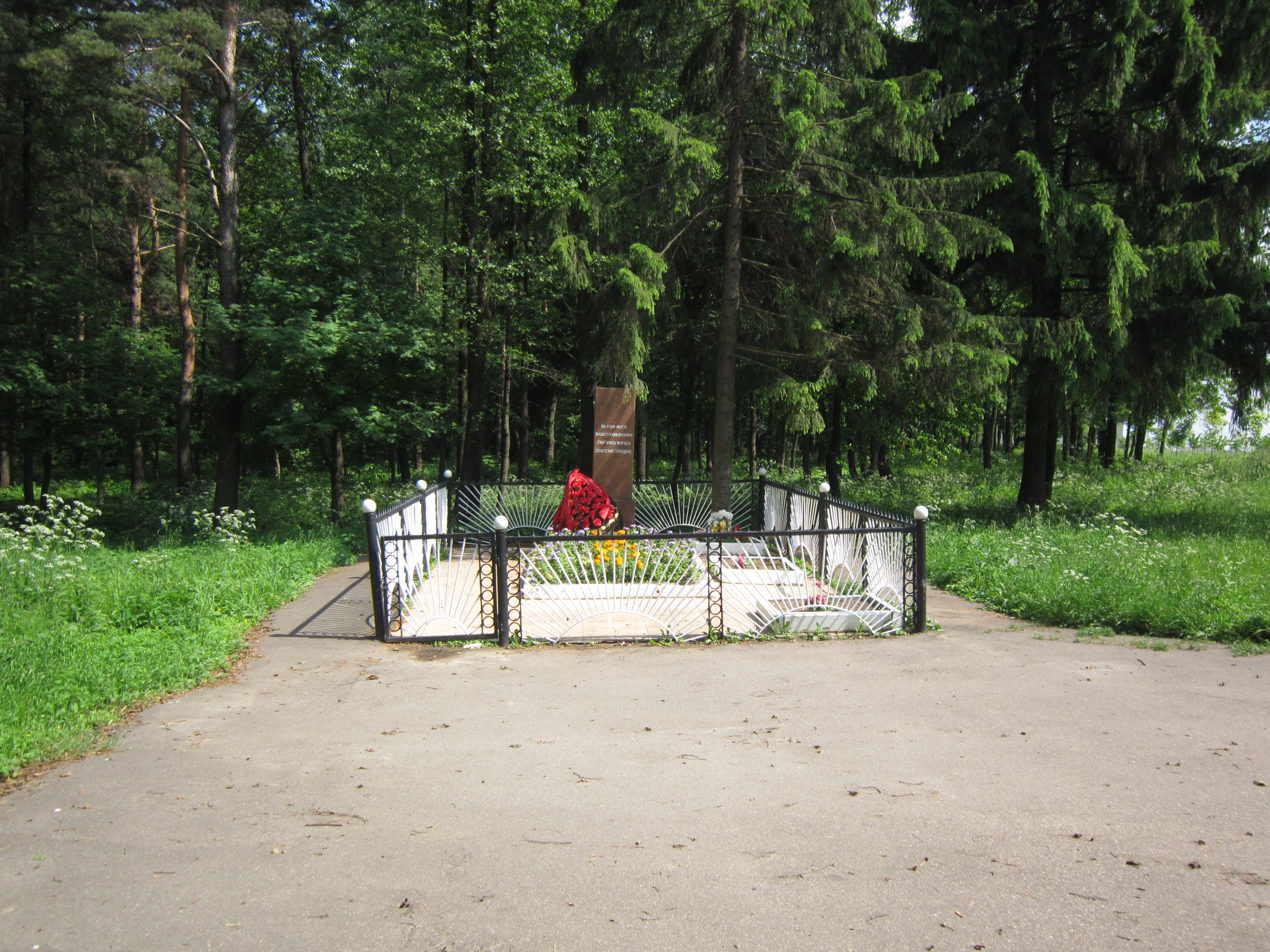
Memorial sign on the place of main massacres

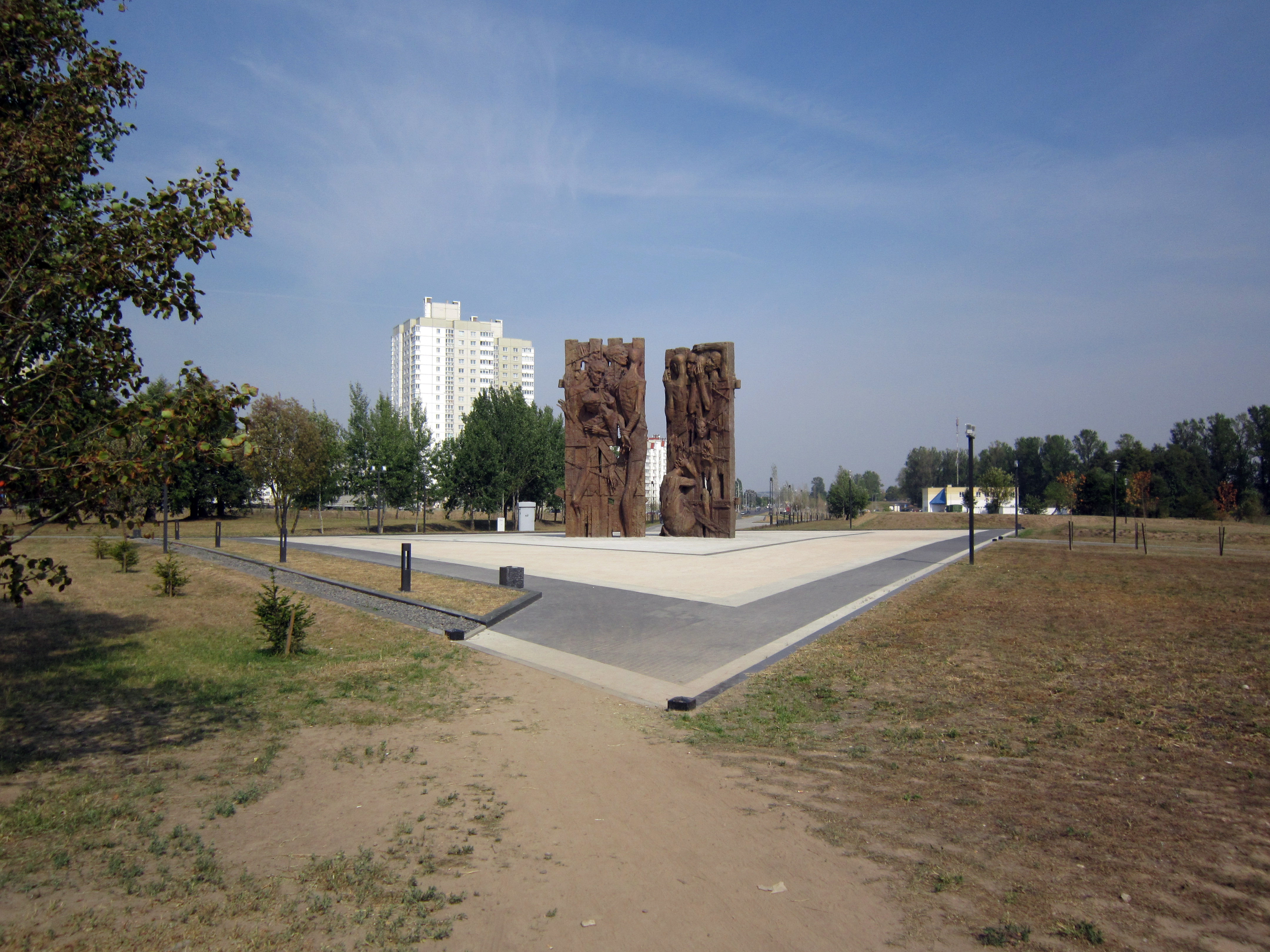
Memorial complex, built in 2015

== See also ==
- List of Nazi concentration camps
- Nazi concentration camps
