= Saint James Windward Parish =

Coordinates: 17°10′30″N 62°33′56″W

Saint James Windward
- Parish
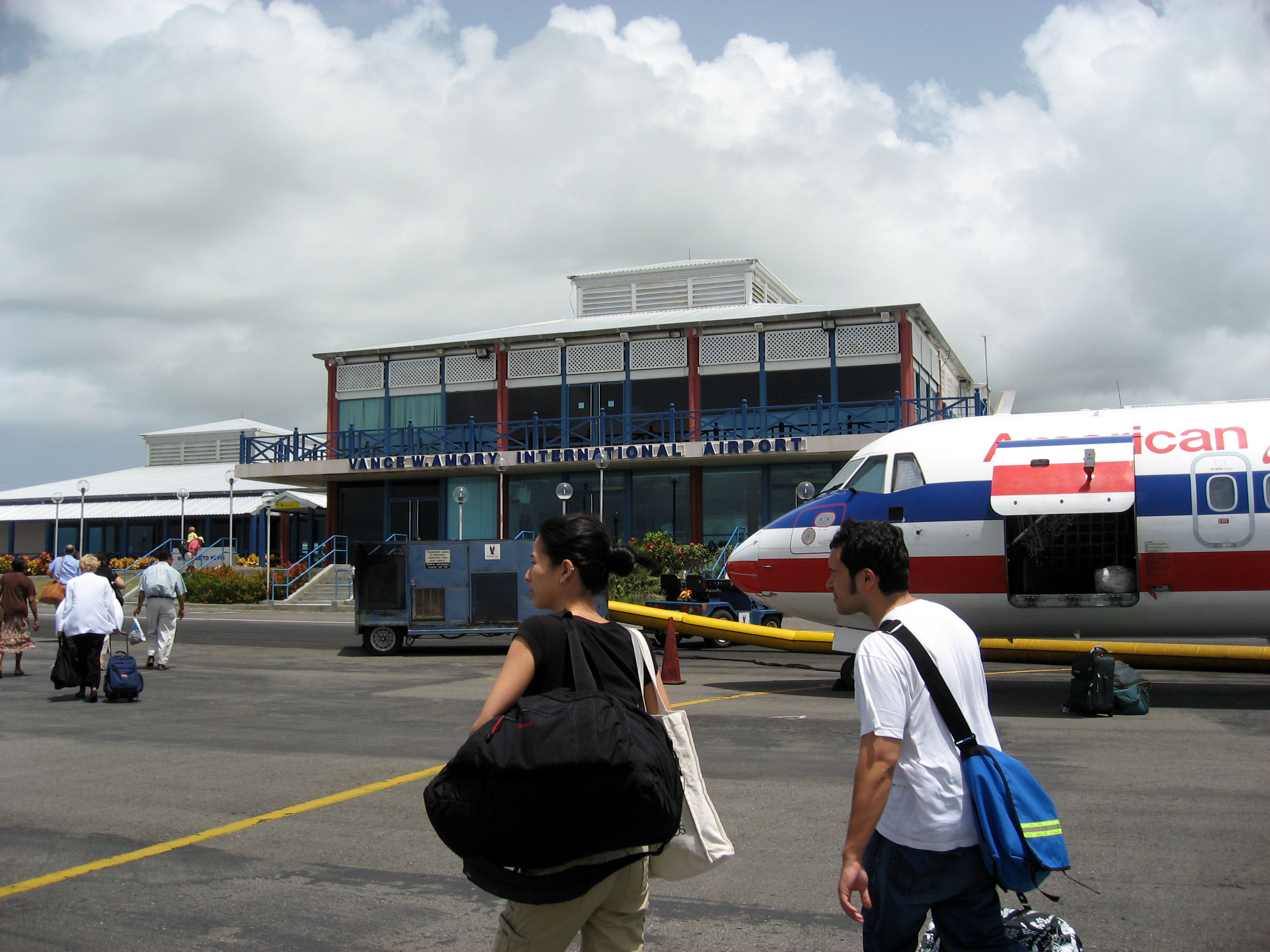
- Newcastle's Vance W. Amory International Airport

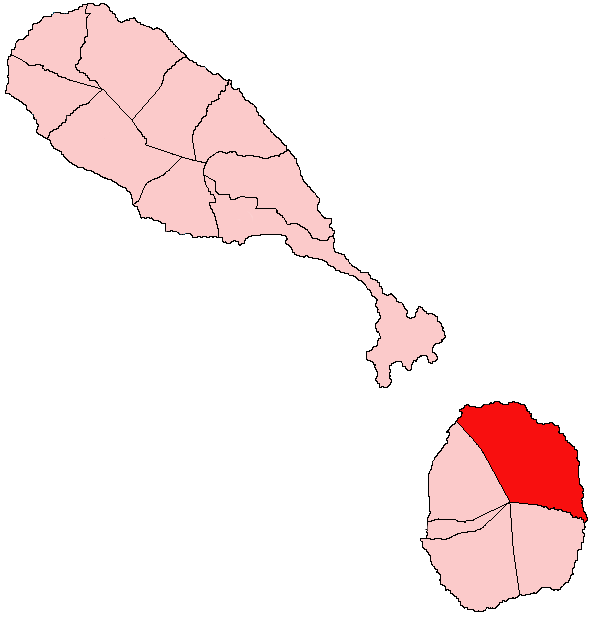
- Country: Saint Kitts and Nevis
- Capital: Newcastle

Area
  - Total: 32 km^{2} (12 sq mi)

Population (2011)
  - Total: 2,038
  - Density: 64/km^{2} (170/sq mi)

Saint James Windward is the largest of five parishes on the island of Nevis. These five parishes are in turn part of the 14 administrative parishes making up the Federation of Saint Kitts and Nevis.

Saint James Parish is located in the northeastern section of the island of Nevis and the parish capital is Newcastle, which is next to the Nevis airport. Not far east from Newcastle is the hotel Nisbet Plantation Beach Club, and the Newcastle Pottery.

In terms of land area, Saint James is the largest in Saint Kitts and Nevis, but it is also one of the least populated, as it is mainly consisting of small communities separated by larger areas of dry scrub. The villages in this parish include Newcastle, Rawlins, Mount Lily, Fountain, Camps, Burnaby, Hicks, Brick Kiln, Whitehall, and Butlers.

All the Nevis parishes were drawn up to include a segment of Nevis Peak itself, but this parish also includes a secondary peak at 1901 feet, which is unnamed on the Ordnance Survey map, but which is locally known as "Butlers Peak" because it is near the village of Butlers. The parish also includes an ancient weathered volcanic core called Round Hill and a smaller coastal core called Hurricane Hill. The northern coast of Saint James Parish has several long sandy beaches: Lover's Beach, Newcastle Beach and Long Haul Bay. The more easterly part however is mostly rocky coast. Behind Butler's peak, there is flourishing rain forest.

At the southern end of the parish there are extensive colonial sugarcane plantation ruins:

- Eden Brown Estate
- New River Estate
- Coconut Walk Estate

== Education ==
- Medical University of the Americas – Nevis

== Transportation ==
- Vance W. Amory International Airport
