= Hurricane Paloma =

Category 4 Atlantic hurricane in 2008

- Paloma approaching Cuba shortly after peak intensity on November 8

Meteorological history
- Formed: November 5, 2008
- Remnant low: November 10, 2008
- Dissipated: November 14, 2008

Category 4 major hurricane
- 1-minute sustained (SSHWS/NWS)
- Highest winds: 145 mph (230 km/h)
- Lowest pressure: 944 mbar (hPa); 27.88 inHg

Overall effects
- Fatalities: 1 total
- Damage: $455 million (2008 USD)
- Areas affected: Central America, Jamaica, Cayman Islands, Cuba, Bahamas, Florida
- IBTrACS
- Part of the 2008 Atlantic hurricane season

Hurricane Paloma was a strong late-season tropical cyclone that set several records for its intensity and formation. It was the sixteenth tropical storm, eighth hurricane and fifth major hurricane of the 2008 Atlantic hurricane season. Paloma was, at the time, the third most powerful November hurricane on record (but has since dropped to fifth) in the Atlantic Basin, behind only the 1932 Cuba hurricane, 2020's hurricanes Iota and Eta, and a tie of 1999's Hurricane Lenny, and 2001's Hurricane Michelle. Paloma also marked the first time that at least one major hurricane formed in every month of the hurricane season from July to November, with only June not having a major hurricane in the season.

Paloma developed out of a strong tropical disturbance off the eastern coast of Nicaragua and northern coast of Honduras on November 5. The disturbance had slowly developed into a tropical depression while hugging the coastline. The depression strengthened into a tropical storm early on November 6, then a hurricane later that day. The next day, Paloma intensified into a Category 2 hurricane, then soon afterward into a Category 3 major hurricane. Early on November 8, Paloma continued to intensify and reached Category 4 intensity, and then weakened rapidly into a Category 2 hurricane before making landfall in Santa Cruz del Sur, Cuba. Paloma weakened into a tropical storm on November 9 while moving over Cuba, where it stalled. It dissipated later that evening. Hurricane Paloma caused heavy damage in both the Cayman Islands and Cuba. Overall, the total damage from Paloma stands at $454.5 million, with one fatality.

== Meteorological history ==
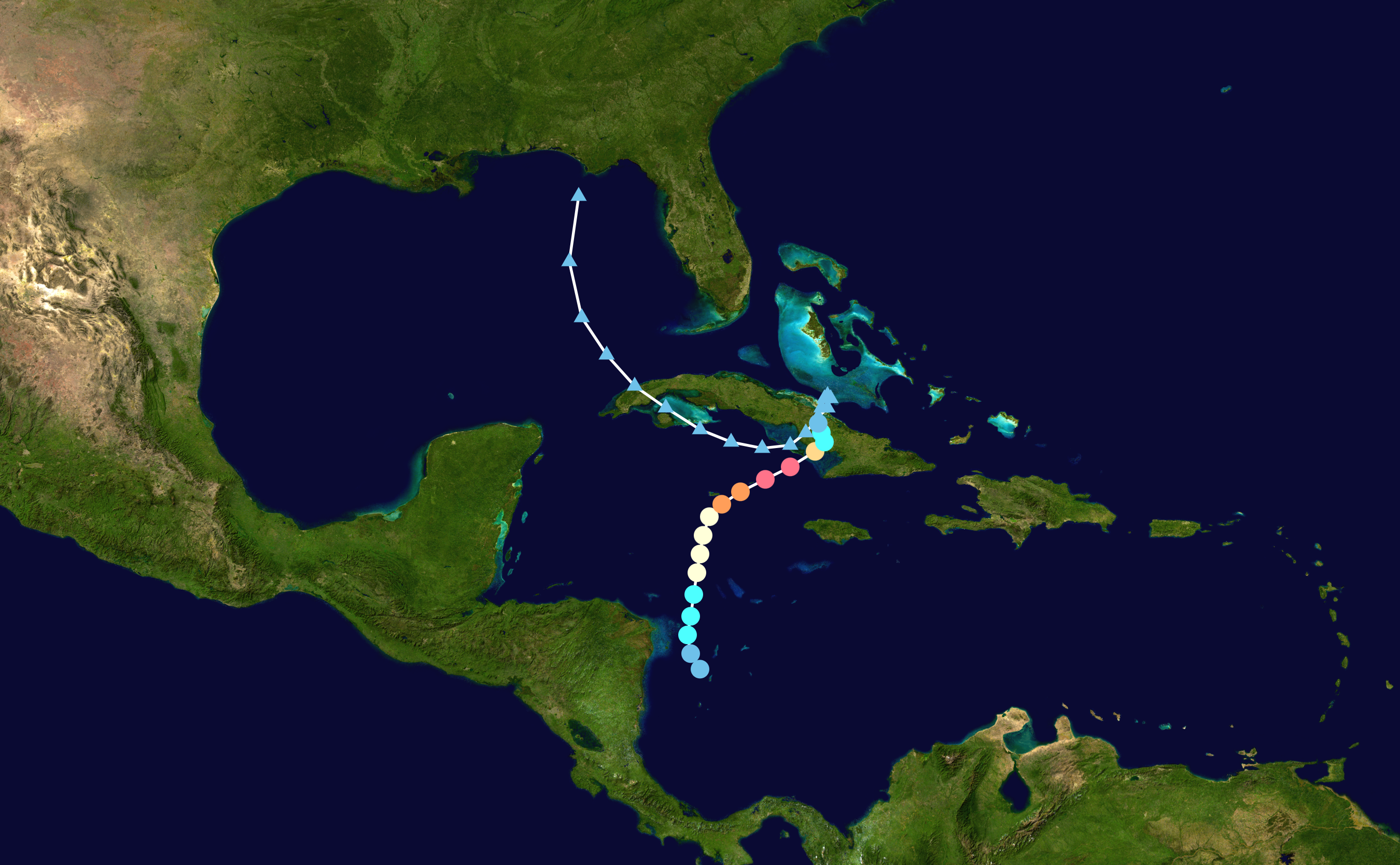
Map plotting the storm's track and intensity, according to the Saffir–Simpson scale Map key Saffir–Simpson scale Tropical depression (≤38 mph, ≤62 km/h) Tropical storm (39–73 mph, 63–118 km/h) Category 1 (74–95 mph, 119–153 km/h) Category 2 (96–110 mph, 154–177 km/h) Category 3 (111–129 mph, 178–208 km/h) Category 4 (130–156 mph, 209–251 km/h) Category 5 (≥157 mph, ≥252 km/h) Unknown Storm type Tropical cyclone Subtropical cyclone Extratropical cyclone, remnant low, tropical disturbance, or monsoon depression

In early November 2008, an area of disturbed weather persisted over the southwestern Caribbean Sea. By November 2, a surface trough manifested itself, spurring the development of scattered convection — shower and thunderstorm activity — across the region. A tropical wave approaching from the east interacted with this trough two days later and enhanced convective organization. Steadily consolidating, the system developed into a tropical depression by 18:00 UTC on November 5 while located 130 mi (215 km) southeast of the Nicaragua/Honduras border. Situated along the southwestern edge of a ridge, the depressed initially generally to the north-northwest before turning north-northeast within 12 hours of formation. Favorable environmental conditions, including low wind shear, allowed for steady intensification following cyclogenesis. The Hurricane Weather Research and Forecasting model and Geophysical Fluid Dynamics Laboratory forecast models depicted rapid development of the tropical depression into a Category 3 hurricane within five days, before striking Cuba, the former of which indicated a peak intensity of 131 mph (211 km/h) and 921 mbar (hPa; 27.20 inHg). The system acquired gale-force winds early on November 6, at which time it was assigned the name Paloma. Aided by good upper-level outflow, deep convection blossomed over the storm's circulation. Further development of banding features and eye resulted in Paloma rapidly intensifying into a Category 1 hurricane by 00:00 UTC on November 7.

Infrared satellite image of Hurricane Paloma at 10:08 UTC on November 8, shortly before peak intensity

The initial phase of rapid intensification temporarily abated on November 7, though slow strengthening continued. Once its eye became defined on visible satellite imagery that evening, rapid strengthening ensued once more. A localized area of high ocean heat content bolstered this phase. Aided by increasing divergence from an approaching upper-level trough, Paloma's outflow greatly enhanced overnight. The aforementioned trough imparted a slightly more northeasterly track on the hurricane. Around 09:00 UTC on November 8, the hurricane skirted Little Cayman as a Category 3 hurricane. Rapid intensification continued through the first half of the day with Paloma reaching Category 4 hurricane on the Saffir–Simpson hurricane wind scale (SSHWS) around 10:30 UTC, the first such November system since Hurricane Michelle in 2001. Around this time the storm's center passed over Cayman Brac and Little Cayman shortly thereafter. An unofficial anemometer on Cayman Brac at an elevation of 240 ft (73 m) measured sustained winds of 151 mph (243 km/h). Based on data from reconnaissance aircraft, which found flight-level winds 163 mph (262 km/h), Paloma peaked with maximum one-minute sustained winds of 145 mph (230 km/h) at 12:00–18:00 UTC, along with a minimum barometric pressure of 944 mbar (hPa; 27.88 inHg). This ranked the system as the third-strongest November hurricane on record, only behind the 1932 Santa Cruz del Sur hurricane and Hurricane Lenny in 1999. Additionally, this marked the first time that major hurricanes developed in five separate months during a single year, with Bertha, Gustav, Ike, and Omar reaching this strength in July, August, September, and October respectively. At its peak, Paloma displayed a well-defined eye surrounded by intense convection estimated at −70 to −80 °C (−94 to −112 °F).

Late on November 8, environmental conditions abruptly became hostile as the hurricane approached Cuba. Interaction with land hastened Paloma's weakening with convection diminishing significantly. The northern eyewall moved ashore around 23:00 UTC while the center itself made landfall at 01:00 UTC on November 9 near Santa Cruz del Sur. Upon moving ashore, Paloma was estimated to have had winds of 100 mph (155 km/h), making it a Category 2 hurricane. Within hours of moving ashore, the center of circulation decoupled from the remaining convection and its forward speed slowed significantly. The system subsequently degraded to a tropical depression by 18:00 UTC, just 24 hours after being a Category 4 hurricane. With no convection redeveloping as the system drifted northward over Cuba, Paloma degenerated into a remnant low six hours later. The low then briefly moved over the Atlantic Ocean before doubling back to the southwest in response to a building ridge farther north. The system crossed Cuba again and re-emerged over the Caribbean Sea by November 12, changing direction this time to the west and later northwest. After crossing western Cuba early on November 13, the remnants of Paloma entered the Gulf of Mexico. Accelerating northward the low became decreasingly organized and ultimately dissipated early the next day about 70 mi (110 km) south-southwest of Apalachicola, Florida. Later on November 14, the system moved inland over the Florida Panhandle where a sudden burst of convective development, akin to that of supercell thunderstorms over the Great Plains, took place. Thereafter, energy from Paloma may have contributed to a storm that generated a deadly tornado outbreak in The Carolinas on November 15.

== Preparations ==
=== Cayman Islands ===
Infrared satellite image of Hurricane Paloma at 11:09 UTC on November 7 as it approached the Cayman Islands

At 15:00 UTC on November 6, the Government of the Cayman Islands issued a hurricane watch for all of the territory's islands. This was superseded six hours later by a hurricane warning. The warning was eventually discontinued early on November 9 once Paloma cleared the islands. On November 7, the Red Cross opened a shelter for possible evacuees while stocks of emergency supplies were checked. Schools, businesses, and government offices closed for November 8. Shelters opened on Grand Cayman closed their doors by mid-afternoon in advance of Paloma's arrival to "ensure that persons get off the roads." At least 40 people sought refuge in these shelters prior to the storm's arrival. The Seaman's Center, a government office building, was utilized as an unofficial shelter during the storm and housed at least 100 people. The Cayman Islands Government requested all hotels to move guests on ground and first floors to higher rooms. As a precautionary measure, water service was turned off during the evening on November 8. The British ship RFA Wave Ruler was sent to Little Cayman and Cayman Brac for humanitarian assistance, on the order of Governor Stuart Jack.

=== Cuba ===
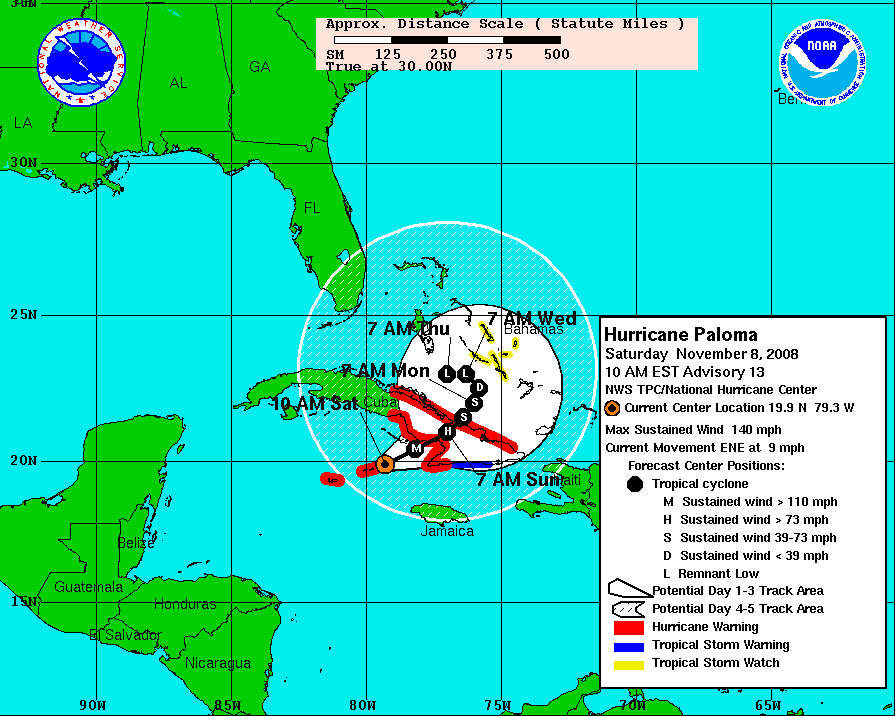
The NHC's forecast track of Hurricane Paloma and associated watches/warnings at 15:00 UTC on November 8

Anticipating hurricane conditions to impact portions of eastern Cuba, the nation's government issued a hurricane watch for the provinces of Camagüey, Ciego de Ávila, Granma, Las Tunas, and Sancti Spíritus at 12:00 UTC on November 7. Six hours later, this was upgraded to a hurricane warning except and by the November 8, warnings covered the entirety of eastern Cuba. These advisories were discontinued following Paloma's rapid dissipation over land on November 9.

Fearing a "potentially catastrophic" storm with a storm surge of 20 to 25 ft (6.1 to 7.6 m), officials in Cuba scrambled to evacuate nearly half a million people in southern areas of the country. Coincidentally, Paloma threatened the same area where a devastating hurricane in 1932 killed more than 3,000 people almost exactly 76 years prior. Plans were put in place to evacuate 345,000 in Holguín, 324,000 in Granma, 250,000 people in Las Tunas, and 200,000 in Camagüey. An estimated 3,000 tourists in Ciego de Avila were brought to shelters. Ultimately, an approximate 1.2 million people, 10.7% of Cuba's entire population, were relocated in advance of the storm's arrival. Of these people, 220,000 sought refuge in 1,448 shelters while the rest stayed with relatives. A total of 927 food processing centers and 72 soup kitchens opened to feed evacuees. Roughly 237,000 animals were moved to safer areas. Holguín Province was devastated by Hurricane Ike in September with many residents still homeless at the time of Paloma's approach. All domestic flights except those around the Isle of Youth. Former President Fidel Castro urged people to remain positive in the face of yet another hurricane that year. He also issued a written statement to the United States rejecting any aid, citing anger toward the ongoing embargo of Cuba, before a formal offer was even made. The non-profit organization Operation USA provided emergency aid to Cuba.

=== Elsewhere ===
Following the classification of Tropical Depression Seventeen late on November 5, a tropical storm watch was issued for coastal areas between Puerto Cabezas, Nicaragua and Limon, Honduras. This later expired on November 6 as Paloma moved away from the region. Owing to the threat of heavy rains in Honduras, a red alert was issued for Colón, Gracias a Dios, northern Olancho, and the Bay Islands.

Although Paloma was not forecast to directly impact Jamaica, officials opened 15 priority shelters in St. James and all agencies were placed under high-alert on November 8. A flash flood warning was in place from November 6–9 for the entire island.

Early on November 8, a tropical storm watch and later tropical storm warning was issued for the Central Bahamas, including Cat Island, Exuma, Long Island, Rum Cay, San Salvador, Crooked Island, Acklins, and Ragged Island. Accordingly, the National Emergency Operations Centre was partially activated. The warning was allowed to expire the following day as Paloma rapidly weakened over Cuba, and the National Emergency Operations Centre issued an all clear on November 10.

== Impact ==
=== Honduras and Nicaragua ===
Throughout much of October Central America, was plagued by a series of heavy rain events which resulted in widespread damage and loss of life. The outer bands of then Tropical Storm Paloma exacerbated the situation in parts of Honduras and Nicaragua. Estimates from the Tropical Rainfall Measuring Mission satellites indicated that Paloma dropped upwards of 8 in (200 mm) of rain along coastal areas. The overall impacts of flooding since October in Honduras left at least 60 people dead and more than 300,000 in need of assistance.

=== Cayman Islands ===
Passing directly over the small islands Cayman Brac and Little Cayman, with a collective population of 2,695, Hurricane Paloma wrought tremendous damage. Grand Cayman escaped almost entirely unscathed. Throughout the Cayman Islands, Paloma was responsible for $154.4 million in losses of which $124.5 million was incurred from damage. This equates to roughly 7.4 percent of the territory's gross domestic product (GDP). While the overall impact to the islands was offset by a lack of damage on Grand Cayman, the localized losses on Cayman Brac and Little Cayman were tremendous. Discounting the economy of Grand Cayman, the equivalent GDP losses on the two smaller islands was likely similar to that of Hurricane Ivan in 2004, which left damage equal to 183 percent of the territory's GDP. The overall per capita impact there reached $57,925. Despite the severity of damage, no loss of life or injuries took place.

Destructive winds and torrential rains battered both Cayman Brac and Little Cayman, with an unofficial elevated observation station reporting maximum sustained winds of 151 mph (243 km/h) during the height of the storm. Grand Cayman saw lesser winds, with a peak sustained observation of 60 mph (97 km/h) at Owen Roberts International Airport. Precipitation on Cayman Brac amounted to 17.77 in (451 mm) and 6.05 in (154 mm) on Grand Cayman. A significant storm surge also impacted the islands, reaching 8 ft (2.4 m) on Cayman Brac and 4 ft (1.2 m) on Little Cayman.

Destructive winds were the primary cause of damage across Cayman Brac and Little Cayman, where nearly all homes were affected. Cayman Brac sustained the most severe impact, with 71 homes destroyed and 912 damaged. Although all home on Little Cayman were affected, none experienced major damage. Bodden Town was the only district on Grand Cayman reporting damage, with 11 homes affected. Major damage took place at Cayman Brac's seaport. The port's warehouse and office building were destroyed while anchors and moorings were shifted out of position. The island's fire station and Faith Hospital had major roof damage, with the latter resulting in significant water damage to equipment. The roof of the Seaman's Center, later determined to have been inadequately built, collapsed during the storm and nearly injured people sheltering within it. All schools on Cayman Brac suffered moderate to major damage while the primary school on Little Cayman experienced minor damage.

The electrical grid sustained major damage, with all residents on Cayman Brac and Little Cayman losing service. Roughly 400 power poles fell during the storm. Telecommunications experienced similar damage, with landline services disrupted for two to three weeks. Six of the ten affected Digicel sites went down. Effects on the water supply was negligible, with only a few pipes damaged by uprooted trees. Major crop damage took place on Grand Cayman, primarily to bananas, plantains, and peppers, due to high winds.

=== Jamaica ===
Flooding was reported in parts of Jamaica as a result of the outer bands of Paloma. One person drowned in Clarendon Parish while crossing a flooded river. Severe flooding also destroyed crops in 100 farms, causing over $100,000 in damages. In St. Catherine, several inches of rain caused flooding in Bog Walk Gorge which inundated several homes and stranded at least 15 people. Numerous vehicles were washed away in the floods.

=== Cuba ===
Hurricane Paloma was the final tropical cyclone to impact Cuba during the destructive 2008 season. Preceded by Fay, Gustav, Hanna, and Ike, Paloma compounded damage sustained by the nation. The 2008 season is regarded as the most destructive in Cuban history, primarily due to the effects of Gustav and Ike. Total damage from hurricanes that year amounted to $9.4 billion.

Cuban utility officials say Paloma's effect on the power grid was not as bad as the destruction caused by Gustav and Ike earlier in the season. Paloma did, however knock down power and telephone lines, as well as a major communications tower. The hurricane brought with it a 14-foot (4 meter) storm surge which moved the coastline inland by almost a mile (about 1.5 km) in Santa Cruz del Sur, doing extensive damage.

In Santa Cruz del Sur where Paloma came ashore, 435 homes were torn to shreds. The sea swept more than a mile inland. The wind and waves left wooden houses in splinters, topped with seaweed. Two of the two-story concrete walls of a factory crumbled into piles of rubble, smashing 57 wooden fishing boats stored inside for safekeeping. An estimated 328 hectares of crops were destroyed by the storm, most of which were in the process of recovery following Hurricane Ike. A total of 8,000 homes in Santa Cruz were damaged and another 670 in Camaguey and Las Tunas. About 7,000 farmers and 4,700 residences were isolated by floodwaters. Overall damages in Cuba totaled to $300 million.

=== Florida ===
After tracking through the Gulf of Mexico, the remnants of Paloma reached the Florida Panhandle on November 14. Shortly before crossing the coastline, convection suddenly and explosively developed, contributing to a swath of heavy rains. The highest amount was recorded in Bloxham at 9.25 inches (235 mm) which contributed to flash flooding. Unofficial radar observations indicated rainfall totals up to 14 inches (360 mm). The torrential rains marked the highest rainfall for November 14 in the state of Florida. Flood waters south of Tallahassee reached 2 feet (0.61 m) in places, stranding vehicles. One person was trapped by floodwaters but was rescued without injury.

== Aftermath ==
=== Cayman Islands ===
Local groups in the Cayman Islands set up funds following Hurricane Paloma. By March 3, 2009, one group raised $120,000 in relief funds and received another $20,000 in donations. Following the storm, the British Red Cross released £15,000 (US$23,500) in emergency funds. The Government of the Cayman Islands and the Adventist Disaster Response Agency distributed basic relief items such as tarpaulins, hygiene items and buckets to victims of the storm.

The overall impacts from Hurricane Paloma were reflected in the territory's GDP by a 0.9 percent decrease, worth $33 million, in the expected growth for 2008. Total revenue fell by $11.6 million while expenditures rose by $28.2 million. (Note: The total was originally reported in Cayman Islands dollars. Total converted via the Oanda Corporation website.) Strain on the economy prompted inflation to rise slightly above 5.2 percent for the year as well.

Between November 18 and December 13, 675 tons of debris was collected which covered an area of 21 acres by 12 ft (3.7 m) tall.

=== Cuba ===
Already severely impacted by Hurricanes Gustav and Ike, the European Commission, through its Humanitarian Aid department was already providing €2 million (US$2.7 million) in relief aid. By November 21, about 6,000 volunteers from the International Federation of Red Cross and Red Crescent Societies were in Cuba assisting in cleanup efforts and helping victims in shelters. The organization also allocated US$8.8 million in relief funds for 60,000 people affected by Paloma.

=== Retirement ===
Due to the hurricane's destructive effects in the Cayman Islands and Cuba, the name Paloma was retired by the World Meteorological Organization in April 2009, and it will never again be used for another Atlantic tropical cyclone. It was replaced with Paulette for the 2014 season.

== See also ==
- Timeline of the 2008 Atlantic hurricane season
- Tropical cyclones in 2008
- List of Category 4 Atlantic hurricanes
- List of Cuba hurricanes
- Hurricane Michelle (2001) – A Category 4 hurricane that took a near identical track, devastating Cuba
- Hurricane Paula (2010) – A small Category 2 hurricane that impacted similar areas
