= Saint Anne Sandy Point Parish =

Coordinates: 17°22′31″N 62°50′29″W

Saint Anne Sandy Point
- Parish
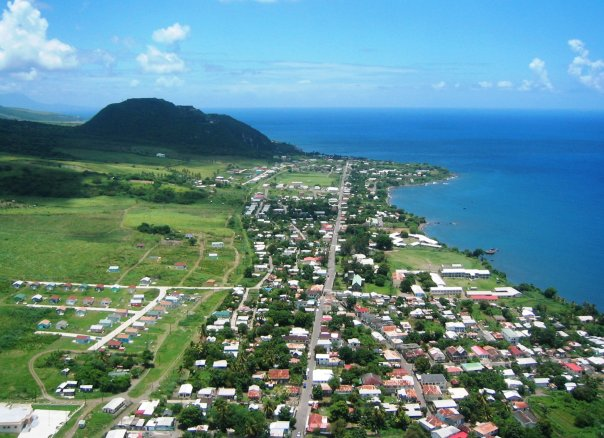
- Sandy Point Town

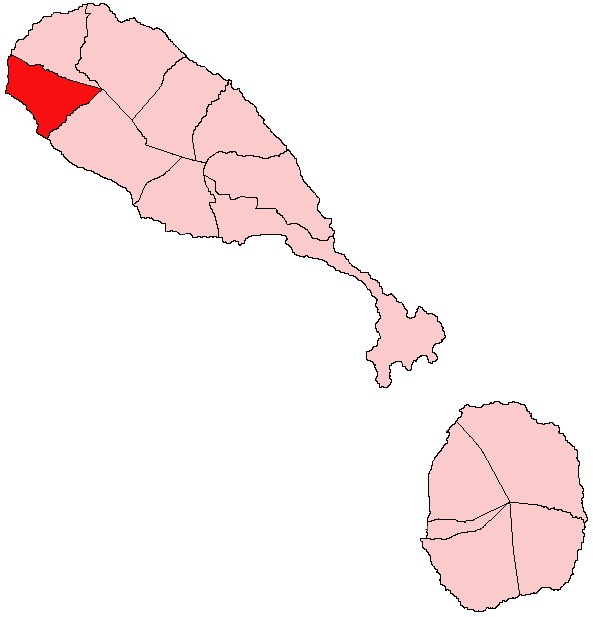
- Country: Saint Kitts and Nevis
- Capital: Sandy Point Town

Area
  - Total: 13 km^{2} (5.0 sq mi)

Population (2011)
  - Total: 2,626
  - Density: 202/km^{2} (520/sq mi)

Saint Anne Sandy Point is one of 14 administrative parishes that make up Saint Kitts and Nevis. It is the smallest parish on St. Kitts in terms of area, at just 5 square miles (13 km^{2}). It is located on the main island of Saint Kitts and the parish capital is Sandy Point Town.

== Land ==
The parish itself is triangular in shape. The coastline of the parish is 4.06 miles (6.53 km) in length, with black sandy beaches, such as Pump Bay and Belle Tête dominating the southern coast, with sheer cliffs to the north. The lower slopes of the parish are dominated by abandoned sugarcane fields, as well as numerous small holdings, cultivating provision crops and tropical fruits. The town of Sandy Point, the second largest town on the island, skirts the southern coast, whilst the village Fig Tree rests just north of it. Moving inwards (east), the terrain shifts from the gently sloping coastal plain to the steep mountains of the North West Range, which, above 1000 feet, above sea level, is draped in tropical forests.

Cranston Ghaut marks the northern border of the parish, whilst Sandy Point Ghaut (an ill-defined ravine near Brimstone Hill Road) marks the southern.

== Town and villages ==
The main settlement in the parish is Sandy Point Town, the federation's second largest settlement, with a population near 3,000. The town rests along the South coast of the parish. The other settlements of the parish act as suburbs to the town, and are usually annexed in local reference to Sandy Point. These are Fig Tree, La Vallée, and Sir Gillee's. Abandoned estate houses dot other areas further inland.

Capital - Sandy Point Town

Other Villages:

- Fig Tree
- La Vallée
- Sir Gillee's Estate

== Economy ==
The town of Sandy Point is home to a small factory, owned by Harowe Servo Controls, which manufactures electrical equipment, but now sadly closed because of rare work. Despite its small size, it was the main employer in the parish, and the largest industrial area outside of Saint George Basseterre Parish. Tourism is the other main employer for the parish. The Sandy Point Area's rich history has left it awash with many of the nation's premier historical sites, such as Fort Charles, and many warehouse building ruins, remnants of when Dutch tobacco trade reigned in the town. Offshore, just west of Sandy Point Town, lies the Sandy Point National Marine Park, often noted as one of the premier dive sites in the Eastern Caribbean.

== Port ==
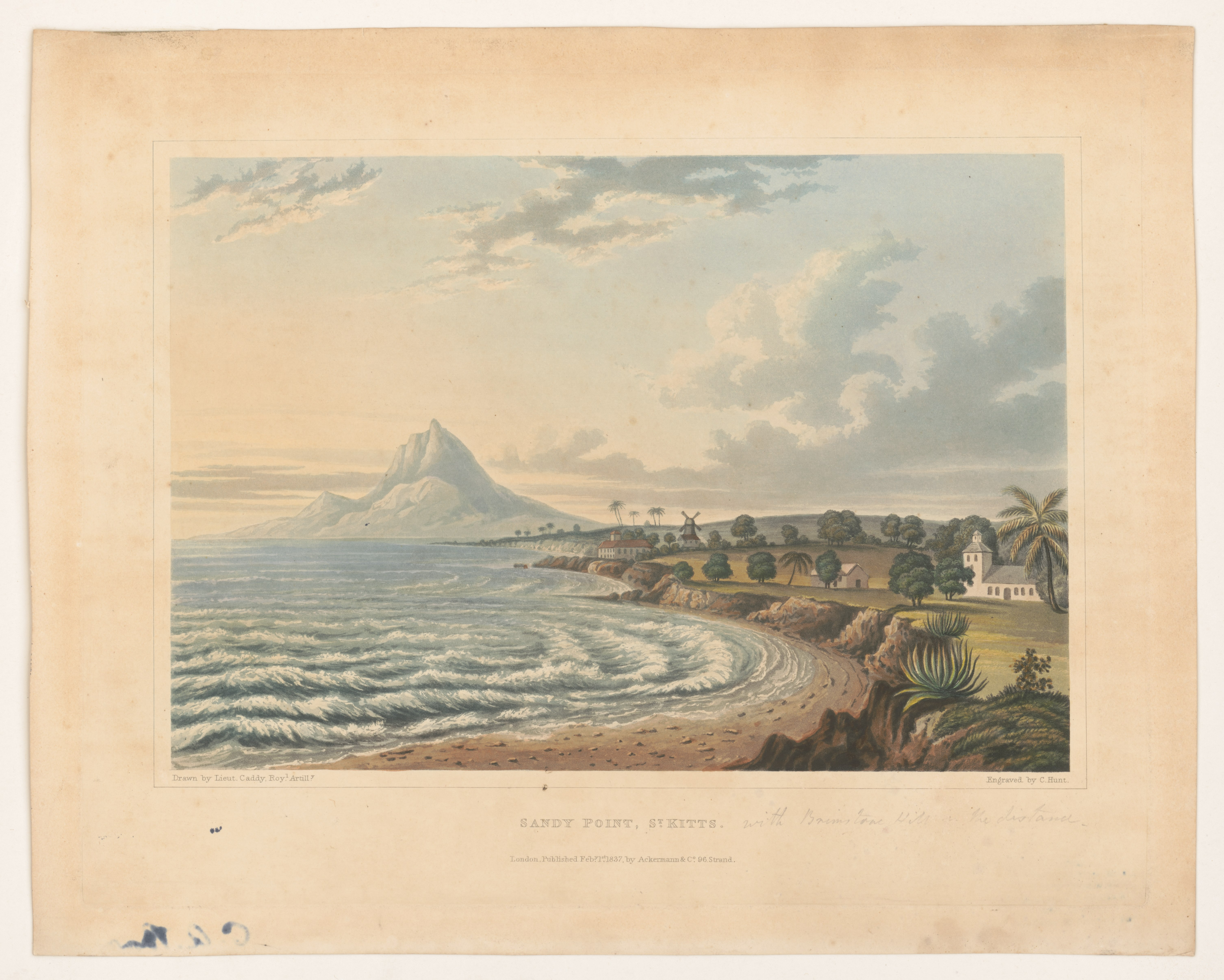
Sandy Point in 1837

In the early 17th century, Sandy Point Town functioned as the main port for British Saint Christopher, and grew wealthy from the tobacco trade. In 1640 when production was shifted to sugar, Sandy Point continued to be Saint Kitts' main port, until 1727, when Basseterre was made capital of the island and most business was shifted. The port of Sandy Point, with its naturally deep water harbour continued to function however, and became the main port on the island for mail and personal goods shipment. The port was destroyed and rebuilt many times in its history, and finally ceased to exist in 1984, via Hurricane Klaus. Its functions were replaced by Deep Water Harbour in Basseterre.

== Community festival ==
The community festival for the parish of St. Anne Sandy Point is Black San' Bang-a-Lang. It is a two weeks long event during the Easter season, and it features calypso shows, queen shows, parties, street jam sessions and late night limes (hang outs) and is one of the most exciting parade of all times. Most activities are held around central Sandy Point and on Pump Bay, Fig Tree and Cleverly Hill.

== Future developments ==
The northern coastal plains of St. Anne Sandy Point parish are currently being developed by the La Vallee Greens Corporation. The finished product will include the La Vallée Golf Course, a marina and port facility for transport to the northern Leeward Islands (Statia, Saba, St. Barths, St. Martin, and Anguilla), Villa developments, and a state-of-the-art sporting facility.
