= Santa Cruz del Sur Municipal Museum =

Museum in Cuba

- Museo Municipal de Santa Cruz del Sur
- Established: 30 December 1982
- Location: Santa Cruz del Sur, Cuba

Santa Cruz del Sur Municipal Museum is a museum located in Santa Cruz del Sur, Cuba. It was established on 30 December 1982.

The museum holds collections on history, weaponry, decorative arts and archeology.

== See also ==
- List of museums in Cuba
