= Santa Cruz del Sur =

- Municipality
- Coat of arms

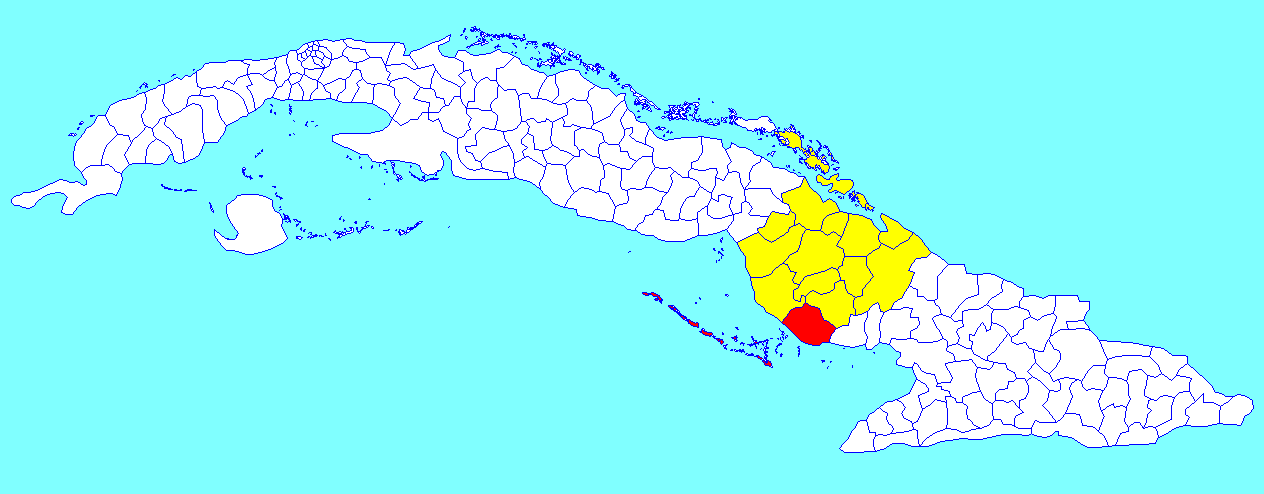
- Santa Cruz del Sur municipality (red) within Camagüey Province (yellow) and Cuba
- Coordinates: 20°43′10″N 77°59′28″W
- Country: Cuba
- Province: Camagüey
- Established: 1871

Area
  - Total: 1,122 km^{2} (433 sq mi)
- Elevation: 5 m (16 ft)

Population (2022)
  - Total: 39,919
  - Density: 35.58/km^{2} (92.15/sq mi)
- Time zone: UTC-5 (EST)
- Area code: +53-3232

Santa Cruz del Sur is a town and municipality in Cuba. It is located in Camagüey Province south of the provincial capital of Camagüey. It lies on the Caribbean coast.

== Geography ==
The municipality is divided into the barrios of Buenaventura, Doce Leguas, El Junco, Gonzalo de Quesada, Guaicanamar, Guayabal, La Calzada, Playa Bonita, San Pedro and Yaguabo.

== History ==
The city has a special place in history due to its total destruction by the storm surge during the catastrophic hurricane of 1932 beginning late on November 8, 1932. In a few hours, approximately at 10:00 am of November 9, the city disappeared under the sea, and more than 3,000 of its inhabitants drowned or were crushed by flying debris carried by winds in excess of 135 mph (215 km/h). Why a select number of survivors escaped the storm, and why the town was not evacuated prior to landfall, persist as questions. The hurricane was rumored to be destined for landfall far east of Santa Cruz, and when notification arrived about the town's peril, landfall was imminent. The last departing trains for evacuation failed to depart due to the storm surge. Fishermen of Santa Cruz were said to have predicted the event, apparently suspecting that "something wrong was brewing in the atmosphere." Survivors provided horrifying testimonies in the wake of a storm that literally drowned people in their homes. Hurricane Paloma also made landfall there 76 years later on the same night in 2008 with 100 mph (160 km/h) winds.

== Demographics ==
In 2022, the municipality of Santa Cruz del Sur had a population of 39,919. With a total area of 1,122 km^{2} (433 sq mi), it has a population density of 36/km^{2} (93/sq mi) In 2022 the urban population was 22,430.

== See also ==
- Santa Cruz del Sur Municipal Museum
- List of cities in Cuba
- Municipalities of Cuba
