= Hurricane Klaus (1984) =

Category 1 Atlantic hurricane in 1984

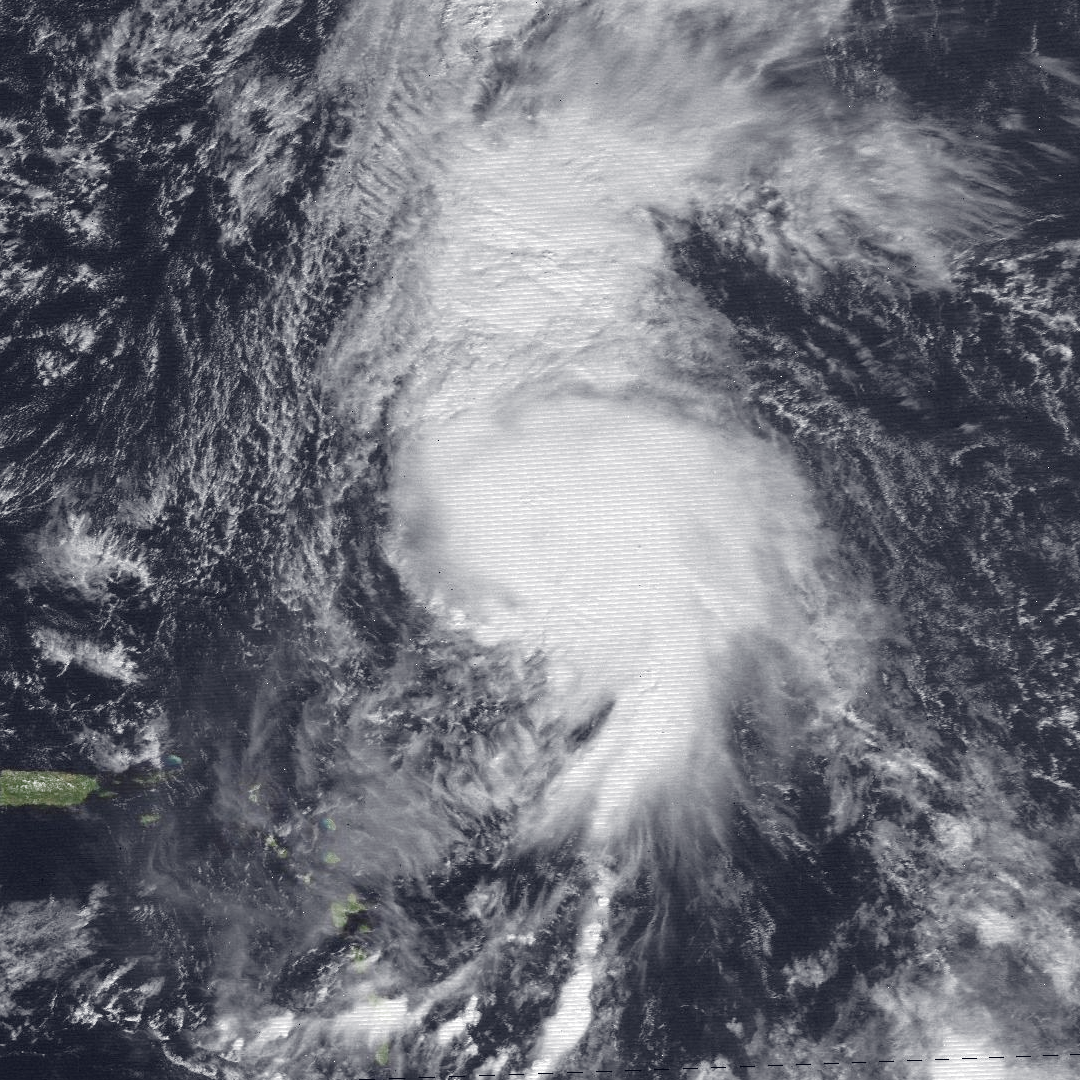
- Hurricane Klaus at peak intensity northeast of the Leeward Islands on November 9

Meteorological history
- Formed: November 5, 1984
- Extratropical: November 13
- Dissipated: November 16, 1984

Category 1 hurricane
- 1-minute sustained (SSHWS/NWS)
- Highest winds: 90 mph (150 km/h)
- Lowest pressure: 971 mbar (hPa); 28.67 inHg

Overall effects
- Fatalities: 2 direct
- Damage: $152 million (1984 USD)
- Areas affected: Puerto Rico, Leeward Islands
- IBTrACS
- Part of the 1984 Atlantic hurricane season

Hurricane Klaus was a North Atlantic hurricane that hit the Leeward Islands from the west in November of the 1984 Atlantic hurricane season. Forming from a broad area of low pressure on November 5, Klaus maintained a northeast movement throughout much of its path. After making landfall on extreme eastern Puerto Rico, it passed to the north of the Leeward Islands, resulting in strong southwesterly winds and rough seas. Klaus attained hurricane status and reached peak winds of 90 mph (145 km/h) before becoming extratropical over cooler waters on November 13. The storm dropped heavy rainfall in Puerto Rico, causing minor flooding and light damage. Klaus caused heavy marine damage in the Leeward Islands, including wrecking at least three ships. The Virgin Islands experienced heavy damage as well.

== Meteorological history ==
Map plotting the storm's track and intensity, according to the Saffir–Simpson scale Map key Saffir–Simpson scale Tropical depression (≤38 mph, ≤62 km/h) Tropical storm (39–73 mph, 63–118 km/h) Category 1 (74–95 mph, 119–153 km/h) Category 2 (96–110 mph, 154–177 km/h) Category 3 (111–129 mph, 178–208 km/h) Category 4 (130–156 mph, 209–251 km/h) Category 5 (≥157 mph, ≥252 km/h) Unknown Storm type Tropical cyclone Subtropical cyclone Extratropical cyclone, remnant low, tropical disturbance, or monsoon depression

A broad area of low pressure gradually developed over the extreme southeastern Caribbean Sea on November 1. It moved slowly westward and steadily organized. By November 4, the system stalled to the north of Curaçao, which was followed by a turn to the northeast. Convection slowly organized as a surface circulation formed, and on November 5 the system developed into Tropical Depression Fifteen. Initially weak with only 20 mph (32 km/h) winds, the depression steadily organized as it moved northeastward, and a Reconnaissance Aircraft mission confirmed the existence of the cyclone on November 6 as it was located midway between Puerto Rico and the Netherlands Antilles. Late on the 6th, the depression strengthened into Tropical Storm Klaus while located a short distance south of Puerto Rico.

Tropical Storm Klaus continued northeastward, and made landfall on extreme eastern Puerto Rico early on November 7. The storm passed a short distance north of the Lesser Antilles, and became the first tropical cyclone in recorded history to affect the islands from the west. Favorable conditions allowed the storm to continue strengthening, and Klaus attained hurricane status early on November 8. The hurricane accelerated to the northeast, and reached its peak intensity of 90 mph (145 km/h) late on November 8. After maintaining its peak strength for 30 hours, Klaus weakened slightly. Interaction with an upper-level low turned the hurricane westward on November 11, though an approaching trough of low pressure turned Hurricane Klaus to the northeast. Cold air and cooler waters weakened the convection around the center on November 12, and Klaus degenerated to a subtropical storm. It accelerated to the northeast and degenerated to an extratropical storm on November 13 while located about 440 miles (700 km) south-southeast of Cape Race, Newfoundland. Six hours later, it was absorbed by another extratropical system.

== Preparations, impact, and aftermath ==
Shortly after forming, gale warnings were issued for Puerto Rico, the Virgin Islands, the Netherlands Antilles of the Leeward Islands, Saint Kitts and Nevis, and Anguilla. Klaus was the first tropical cyclone on record to hit the Leeward Islands from the west, and as a result many were unprepared for the strong winds and rough seas from the southwest.

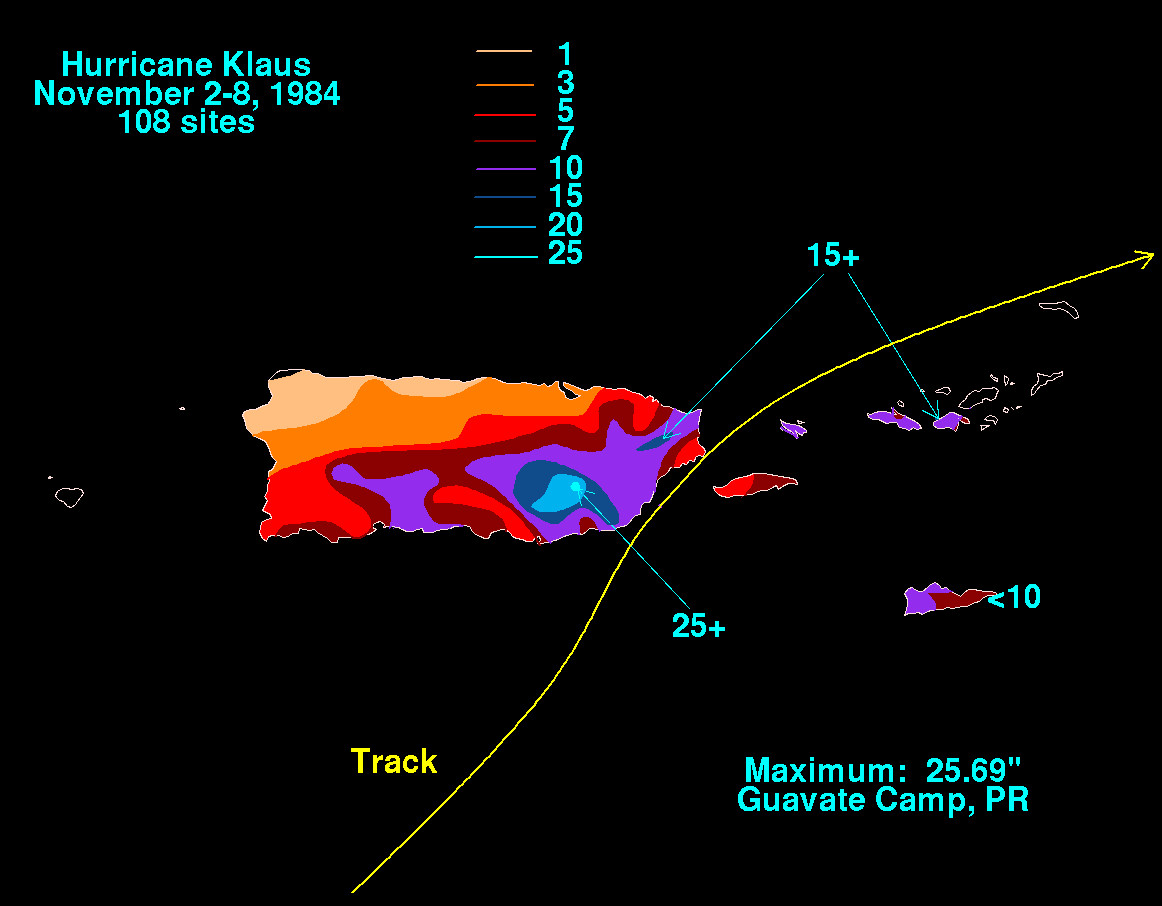
Rainfall totals from Klaus

While moving past Puerto Rico, Tropical Storm Klaus dropped heavy rainfall peaking at 25.69 inches (653 mm) in Guavate Camp in the southeastern part of the island. Much of the southern half of Puerto Rico reported over 7 inches (180 mm) (178 mm). Vieques received around 7 inches of precipitation, while Culebra experienced over 10 inches (250 mm). The heavy rainfall resulted in freshwater flooding. The strongest winds of the storm remained offshore, and wind gusts peaked at 37 miles per hour (60 km/h) in Roosevelt Roads Naval Station. Winds and rainfall on the island resulted in downed trees and power lines, though damage was minimal. Klaus struck the island on election day, causing slight disruptions to the process.

Saint John in the United States Virgin Islands reported over 15 inches (380 mm) of rainfall in association with Tropical Storm Klaus. Both Saint Thomas and Saint Croix received around 10 inches, while rainfall in the British Virgin Islands remained below 10 inches. Tropical Storm Klaus caused severe flooding and extensive damage throughout the U.S. Virgin Islands. Strong southwesterly winds resulted in gale-force winds and rough seas along the southwestern portions of the Leeward Islands. The rough waves caused considerable damage to marine interests in the area. In Anguilla, three ships were wrecked. One mile (1.6 km) off Saint Martin, the rough seas wrecked a cruise ship. The 60 passengers and 23 crew members swam safely to shore, though one person was hospitalized. Rough seas also damaged local coral reefs. 10,000 people were affected on the island of Dominica. There, the storm caused $2 million (1984 USD, $3.9 million 2006 USD) in damage and resulted in two fatalities. In Antigua, strong waves from the hurricane produced severe beach erosion, which endangered a highway behind an eroded beach. Beach erosion was reported in nearby Barbuda, as well. The British Virgin Islands sustained moderate damage totaling to $152 million (1984 USD, $315 million 2008 USD). St. Kitts and Nevis also saw much Leeward coastal damage resulting from the storm, the worst impact being the destruction of the Sandy Point town port in Saint Kitts.

In Anguilla, nine ships, including three that were wrecked from the hurricane, were intentionally sunk in 1990 to create an artificial reef. About a month after the storm passed, President Ronald Reagan declared the U.S. Virgin Islands a major disaster area. The declaration permitted use of federal funds for recovery. The Federal Emergency Management Agency provided an average relief fund of $2,128 (1984 USD, $4,147 2006 USD) per affected person, the smallest return rate for a declared disaster in the Virgin Islands.

== See also ==
- Hurricane Lenny
- Hurricane Omar
- Hurricane Rafael
