= Sandy Point Town =

Town in St. Kitts and Nevis

Coordinates: 17°21′N 62°50′W

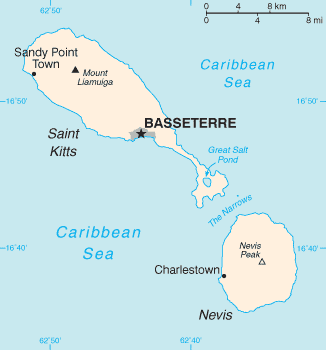
Map of Saint Kitts and Nevis showing location of Sandy Point Town in the upper left

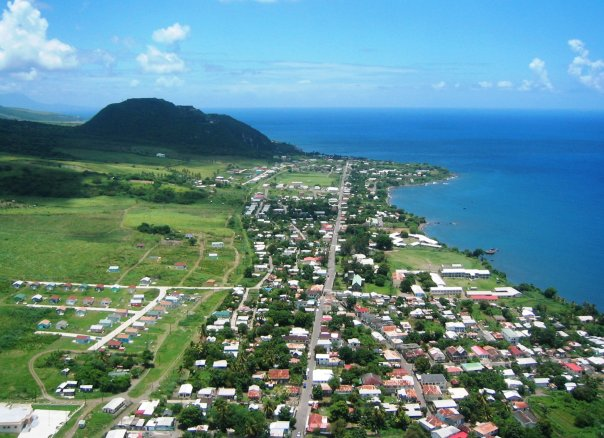
Aerial view of the town of Sandy Point, showing the main road that encircles the island, and Brimstone Hill to the south

Sandy Point is the second-largest town on the island of Saint Kitts, Saint Kitts and Nevis. The settlement is situated on the north-west coast of St. Kitts and is the capital of Saint Anne Sandy Point Parish. As of 2011, it had a population of 2,626.

== Geography ==
The coastal ecosystems surrounding Sandy Point include coral reefs, mangrove stands, and seagrasses. The Sandy Point Ghaut ravine passes through the town. Nearby villages include Fig Tree, La Vallée, Sir Gillee's, Half Way Tree, and Newton Ground.

== History ==
After being founded in the 1620s, the town became the commercial centre of St. Kitts and was one of the busiest anchorages in the region.

After 1727, when the bulk of commercial activity was moved to Basseterre, the town and its port slowly diminished in importance. In 1984, the port was closed entirely following the impact of Hurricane Klaus.

The Brimstone Hill Fortress National Park, a UNESCO World Heritage Site, and the ruins of Fort Charles are located in Sandy Point.

Today, the main industrial activity in Sandy Point Town is manufacturing aeronautics equipment, with Harowe Servo Controls as the town's largest employer. Sandy Point is also a tourism centre.
