= Hurricane Omar =

Category 4 Atlantic hurricane in 2008

- Omar near peak intensity on October 16

Meteorological history
- Formed: October 13, 2008
- Extratropical: October 18, 2008
- Dissipated: October 21, 2008

Category 4 major hurricane
- 1-minute sustained (SSHWS/NWS)
- Highest winds: 130 mph (215 km/h)
- Lowest pressure: 958 mbar (hPa); 28.29 inHg

Overall effects
- Fatalities: 1 indirect
- Damage: $80 million (2008 USD)
- Areas affected: Venezuela, Leeward Antilles, Leeward Islands, Puerto Rico
- IBTrACS
- Part of the 2008 Atlantic hurricane season

Hurricane Omar was a powerful tropical cyclone that took an unusual southwest to northeast track through the eastern Caribbean Sea during mid-October 2008. Forming out of a tropical disturbance on October 13, Omar initially moved slowly in the eastern Caribbean Sea. By October 15, Omar began to quickly intensify as deep convection developed around the center of circulation. Later that day, an eye developed and the storm began to accelerate to the northeast. Early on October 16, Omar reached its peak intensity with maximum winds of 130 mph (210 km/h) and a barometric pressure of 958 mbar (958 hPa; 28.3 inHg). Shortly after, the hurricane rapidly weakened to Category 1 intensity. After slightly re-strengthening the next day, Omar weakened to a tropical storm before degenerating into a non-convective low pressure area. The remnants of Omar persisted until October 21, at which time they dissipated to the west of the Azores.

Throughout the eastern Caribbean, Omar affected numerous islands, most of which only recorded minor impacts. Large swells and heavy rains impacted the ABC islands. Antigua and Barbuda sustained $54 million in damages, mainly on Antigua as nine homes were destroyed, several others damaged and many farms were inundated by flood waters. One person died in Puerto Rico after suffering a stress-induced cardiac arrest. The United States Virgin Islands also sustained significant damage, costing roughly $6 million. Numerous boats and homes were damaged and over 100 power poles were snapped. Total losses from the storm were estimated at $79 million.

== Meteorological history ==
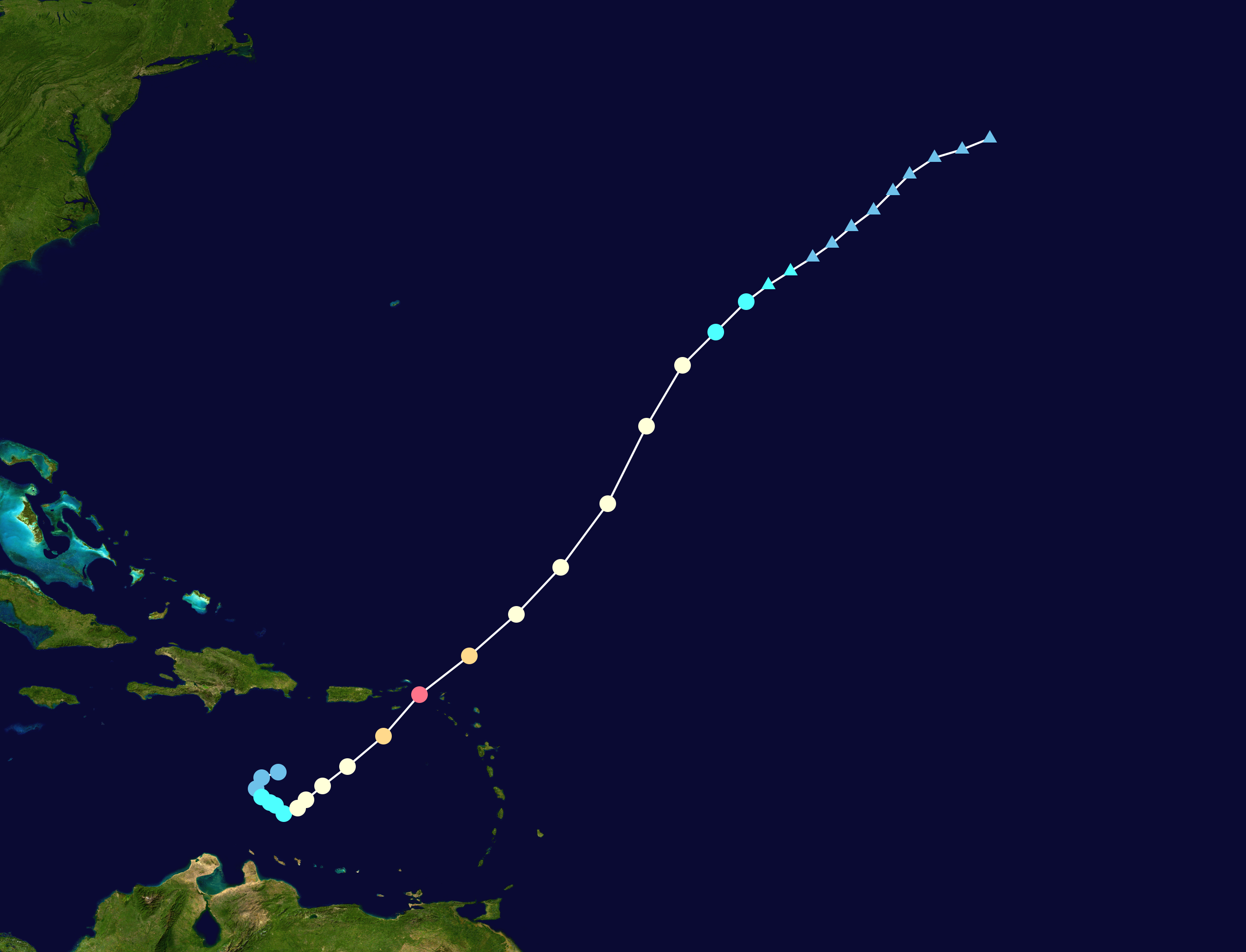
Map plotting the storm's track and intensity, according to the Saffir–Simpson scale Map key Saffir–Simpson scale Tropical depression (≤38 mph, ≤62 km/h) Tropical storm (39–73 mph, 63–118 km/h) Category 1 (74–95 mph, 119–153 km/h) Category 2 (96–110 mph, 154–177 km/h) Category 3 (111–129 mph, 178–208 km/h) Category 4 (130–156 mph, 209–251 km/h) Category 5 (≥157 mph, ≥252 km/h) Unknown Storm type Tropical cyclone Subtropical cyclone Extratropical cyclone, remnant low, tropical disturbance, or monsoon depression

On September 30, a well-developed tropical wave moved off the eastern coast of Africa and entered the Atlantic Ocean. Deep convection formed around a prominent mid-level circulation as it moved towards the west. However, the convection diminished on October 2 before entering the Caribbean Sea a week later. Upon entering the Caribbean Sea, shower and thunderstorm activity redeveloped around the low. Continued development followed and the low was designated as Tropical Depression Fifteen at 0600 UTC on October 13 while located about 190 miles (310 kilometres) south of the southeastern tip of the Dominican Republic. The previous steady westward motion that the system took across the Atlantic halted as it entered an area of weak steering currents and significant motion was not expected for another day or two. As the structure of the storm improved, it was upgraded to a tropical storm and the National Hurricane Center (NHC) gave it the name Omar.

Located to the southeast of a broad and deep tropospheric trough and to the west of a low to mid-level ridge, Omar took a counter-clockwise turn on October 14. Upon becoming a tropical storm, Omar began to undergo an extended period of rapid intensification as very deep convection developed around the center of circulation. Wind shear around the storm, which was previously inhibiting quick development, weakened, allowing for further strengthening. Later that day, an 11.5 to 17.2 mi (18.5 to 27.7 km) wide eye formed as the storm began to turn towards the northeast due to the trough. With the formation of an eye, the Dvorak technique rendered an intensity of 75 mph (121 km/h), signifying that Omar had intensified into a hurricane. The intensification briefly stalled as the eyewall eroded and the center of the storm became slightly elliptical. However, deep convection persisted and strengthening was forecast as the storm neared Puerto Rico. Shortly after, the eye quickly became well-defined and appeared on visible satellite images, an indication the storm was intensifying. The chances of rapid intensification were good as the storm featured well-developed outflow and prominent banding features.

With very warm sea surface temperatures, high ocean heat content, low wind shear, and a moist air mass, Omar quickly reached its peak intensity early on October 16 as a Category 4 hurricane with winds of 130 mph (210 km/h). During the intensification phase, the forward motion of the hurricane increased to 20 mph (32 km/h). Once in the Atlantic Ocean, Omar began to rapidly weaken, with winds decreasing by 50 mph (80 km/h) in 12 hours. Visible satellite images depicted an exposed low-level circulation with convection displaced to the east due to a combination of very high wind shear and dry air. By October 17, most of the deep convection associated with the system dissipated; however, a brief decrease in wind shear allowed Omar to re-strengthen to its secondary peak, with winds of 85 mph (137 km/h). During this phase, convection redeveloped around the center and an eye reformed. Later that day, the trough that caused the rapid northeastern motion bypassed Omar, leading to decreasing movement.

Hurricane Omar at its secondary peak with winds of 85 mph (137 km/h)

A weakening storm, Omar continued towards the northeast due to a mid to upper-level ridge located south of the system and the mid-latitude westerlies to the north. Late on October 17, wind shear increased once more as Omar tracked over waters below 26 °C (79 °F). Around 0000 UTC on October 18, Omar weakened to a tropical storm as deep convection associated with it dissipated. Twelve hours later, while still producing tropical storm-force winds, the storm degenerated into a remnant low-pressure area. The remnants of Omar persisted until 0600 UTC on October 21, when they dissipated about 805 mi (1,296 km) west of the Azores.

== Preparations ==
Infrared satellite loop of Hurricane Omar from October 16 – 17 showing the storm's rapid intensification and subsequent weakening

On October 15, the governor of the United States Virgin Islands announced the final preparations for Hurricane Omar as he signed a State of Emergency declaration for the territory. Public schools would be closed on October 16. All non-essential workers would be dismissed at 10 a.m. local time. At 6 p.m. curfew was put in place for the same day. Only those with valid passes would be allowed to be out after the curfew was put in place. That same day, a Hurricane Warning and flash flood watch were put in place in anticipation of hurricane-force winds and torrential rains from Omar. The American Red Cross planned to open shelters throughout the islands before the hurricane struck. Sandbags were also being distributed in St. Croix. A large oil refinery, which produces 500,000 barrels per day (79,000 m^{3}/d), was shut down and only necessary workers remained at the refinery.

On Sint Maarten, officials advised residents to start all necessary actions to prepare for a hurricane. Residents were told to clear their yards of any debris or lose furniture that could become airborne during the storm, place shutters over windows and doors and assist elderly neighbors with shuttering their homes, and mariners should find a safe haven. A curfew from 10:00 p.m. on October 15 to 10:00 a.m. on October 16 was put in place. Due to the possibility of flash flooding, residents were to unclog and free up all waterways around their homes. Officials also warned people to stay away from areas prone to landslides until the "all-clear" was given. Owners of livestock were advised to have insured that they were secured in holding areas. As a precaution, the water supply would be shut down from 8:00 p.m. October 15 to 8:00 a.m. October 16. Four public areas, St. Peters Community Center, Dutch Quarter Community Center, Genevieve de Weever School, and the Salvation Army building would be used as emergency shelters.

All public activities, flights, and schools were either closed or canceled on Puerto Rico. Eighteen shelters were open on the eastern part of the island. Also, on Anguilla, residents in the Sandy Ground, Valley Bottom, Welches and Mount Fortune areas were placed under evacuation orders. Shelters were opened throughout the island for those in need of shelter. Schools and government offices were also closed and visitors were told to leave the island.

== Impact ==
Omar produced moderate damage throughout numerous islands, amounting to at least $80 million (2008 USD) and one death was related to the storm.

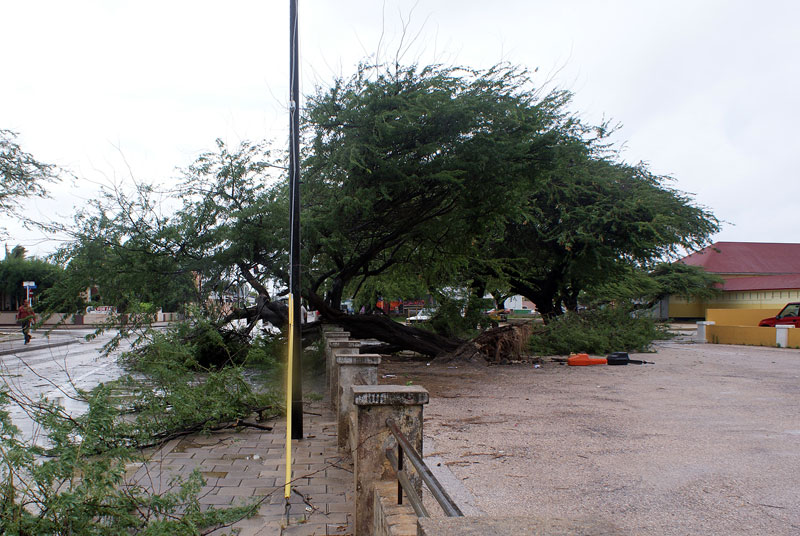
Damage from Hurricane Omar in Aruba

While it was moving little over the south-central Caribbean, Omar brought prolonged tropical storm conditions to the ABC Islands. Sustained winds to near gale force battered the islands, although peak gusts to 58 mph (93 km/h) were confined to Bonaire. In 24 hours, a maximum precipitation total of 4 in (100 mm) was recorded on Aruba, while 1.7 and 1.5 in (43 and 38 mm) of rain fell in Curaçao and Bonaire, respectively. The high winds damaged roofs on all three islands, and rough seas caused beach erosion and significant damage to coastal facilities. Some rain damage also occurred, with significant flooding reported in some parts of Aruba. In the SSS Islands (Saba, St. Eustatius, and Sint Maarten) strong winds from Omar, gusting up to 76 mph (122 km/h), and high waves caused significant damage and coastal flooding. On Sint Maarten, rainfall from the storm totaled to 5.4 in (140 mm). Damage in Sint Maarten was mainly limited to beach erosion and scattered power outages.

The island of Dominica suffered severe damage from Hurricane Omar. The village of Scotts Head, with a population of 450, was cut off from the rest of the country as roads were extensively damaged. The village also suffered water losses, electricity shortage, and landline telephones were cut off. Ports throughout the country were severely damaged. All barge access for hauling sand and stones were destroyed. The airport also sustained some damage. Seven boats ran aground during the storm. Minor damage was reported in Anguilla. Two hotels sustained roof damage, downed treed knocked down power lines causing scattered power outages, and the rough seas caused severe beach erosion. Three cargo ships and seven boats ran aground and two other boats sank.

In Antigua and Barbuda, winds from Omar were recorded at 40 mph (64 km/h), with gusts to 48 mph (77 km/h). Intense squall lines brought torrential rains, falling at rates of 2 in (51 mm) at times, peaking at 2.22 in (56 mm) per hour from 0900 UTC to 1200 UTC on October 16. The maximum recorded rainfall was 9.1 in (230 mm) however, up to 11 in (280 mm) was estimated to have fallen in the mountains. Storm Surge was estimated at 2–4 ft (0.61–1.22 m) with waves reaching 5–8 ft (1.5–2.4 m) in height. Nine homes were destroyed and several landslides were reported. No fatalities were associated with Omar, and only a few sustained minor injuries. The most severe damage was dealt to roads and agriculture due to flooding. Seventy-five people were forced to evacuate to shelters as their homes were flooded. Several farms were washed away, including their livestock. Numerous farmers lost their harvest due to flooding. Damages in Barbuda were estimated at $18 million. Agricultural losses in Antigua amounted to around $11 million (2008 USD) and property damage amounted to $25 million.

In Puerto Rico, a man died after he collapsed from cardiac arrest while trying to install storm shutters on his home. As a tropical wave, the precedent to Omar produced heavy rains over the island, causing minor flooding. After passing by Puerto Rico a second time, Omar produced locally heavy rains, which caused minor street flooding.

On St. Croix, waves up to 15 ft (4.6 m) from Omar sank about 47 boats, leading to a large oil spill around the islands. About 400 ships broke lose from the docks, 200 of which lost their anchors. Omar produced upwards of 7 in (180 mm) of rain on the island within a 24‑hour span. Although St. Croix was brushed by the eyewall, sustained winds reached 53 mph (85 km/h) with gusts to 72 mph (116 km/h). Three people needed to be rescued when their ship struck a reef and began to sink. Most of the islands 55,000 residents were without power as over 100 utility poles were destroyed. Damages on the island were estimated at $700,000 with another $1 million in clean-up costs. St. Thomas, one of the hardest hit islands, was left completely without power in the wake of the hurricane. All of the major intersections were shut down as traffic lights were either on the ground or without power. Damages on the island totaled to $5.3 million.

In the Gros Islet Quarter on St. Lucia, rough seas damaged a jetty and grounded a yacht. In Soufrière, four homes were destroyed by the storm surge, which also made some areas impassible. The storm surge also flooded parts of the Anse la Raye Quarter, leading to officials declaring a mandatory evacuation of the area. On Montserrat, very little damage was reported. A few minor landslides occurred in rural areas; no impact was caused by them. On Nevis there was relatively little damage although the beachfront part of the Four Seasons Resort was severely damaged and was subsequently closed for an extended period. Throughout St. Kitts and Nevis, damage was estimated at $19 million.

== Aftermath ==
Hurricane Omar passing through the Leeward Islands on October 16

The damage dealt to the agricultural sector of Antigua and Barbuda fueled major concerns for "food security" in 2009. The government allocated about $33,897,420 to help develop and repair the industry. Significant expansions of croplands were discussed, 15,000 ft^{2} (1,400 m^{2}) area, to help promote growth of the sector.

On October 29, in the wake of Omar, President George W. Bush signed a major disaster declaration for the United States Virgin Islands, allowing public aid to assist the islands. The Federal Emergency Management Agency or FEMA, had received 60 requests for public assistance throughout the area. Monetary value for the assistance was estimated at $3 million and growing. Twenty-five departments and agencies were approved of for federal support, namely the U.S. V.I. Department of Public Works. Several non-profit organizations also received support from FEMA, while those that did not meet the criteria were referred to the Small Business Administration's low-interest loan program.

On Dominica, Omar's close pass to the island left 30 families homeless and severely hampered the fishing community. On December 15, the Board of Directors of the Caribbean Development Bank approved $9.16 million for assistance to those affected by Omar on the island and to restore the infrastructure damaged by the hurricane. On December 18, the government of Dominica invested $4 million in aid for the fishing communities impacted by Omar. A total of 140 fishermen were provided with $250 per week for a total of four weeks. Sixty-two of which continued to receive funds due to their circumstances. The government also purchased 121 boat engines to distribute to fishers. Another $794,000 was spent to repair 47 boats and construct another 28 that had been damaged or destroyed by Omar. The government also bought replacement fishing gear.

== See also ==
- Tropical cyclones in 2008
- List of South America tropical cyclones
- List of Category 4 Atlantic hurricanes
- Hurricane Klaus (1984) – took a similar unusual west-to-northeast track in Puerto Rico and northern Leeward Islands.
- Hurricane Lenny (1999) – was the last unusual west-to-east track in the Caribbean sea.
