= Private property (disambiguation) =

Private property is a legal designation for the ownership of property by non-governmental legal entities.

Private property may also refer to:

- Private Property (1960 film), an American film starring Kate Manx, Warren Oates and Corey Allen
- Private Property (2006 film), a French-language Belgian film directed by Joachim Lafosse
- Private Property (2022 film), an American film remake of the 1960 film starring Ashley Benson and Shiloh Fernandez

== See also ==
- Property rights (economics)
- Anti-capitalism
