= Heath Freeman (actor) =

American film and television actor (1980-2021)

- Freeman in Bones, 2006
- Born: June 23, 1980
- Died: November 14, 2021 (aged 41)
- Education: New York University Tisch School of the Arts; University of Texas
- Occupations: Film and television actor
- Years active: 2001–2021

Heath Freeman (June 23, 1980 – November 14, 2021) was an American film and television actor. He was best known for playing the recurring role of serial killer Howard Epps in the American police procedural television series Bones.

Freeman guest-starred in television programs including NCIS, Medical Investigation, Without a Trace and ER, and played the recurring role of Gavin Dillon in the TNT legal drama television series Raising the Bar. He also starred as Brent Burkham in the 2010 film Skateland, starring along with Shiloh Fernandez, Ashley Greene, Brett Cullen, Melinda McGraw and Taylor Handley.

Freeman died from combined drug intoxication on November 14, 2021, at the age of 41.
