= Ashley Benson =

American actress (born 1989)

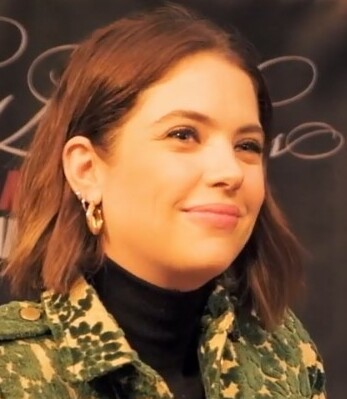
- Benson in 2020
- Born: December 18, 1989 (age 36); Anaheim Hills, California, U.S.
- Occupations: Actress; singer
- Years active: 2002–present
- Spouse: Brandon Davis (m. 2023)
- Children: 1
- Relatives: Marvin Davis (grandfather-in-law); Barbara Davis (grandmother-in-law); Jason Davis (brother-in-law)
- Awards: Full list
- Website: ashbyashleybenson.com

Ashley Benson (born December 18, 1989) is an American actress and singer. Her accolades include four Teen Choice Awards, a Young Hollywood Award, as well as three People's Choice Award nominations.

Benson began her career as a competitive dancer at age three, and transitioned to acting in her teens, first gaining recognition for her role as Abigail Deveraux in the soap opera Days of Our Lives (2004–2007). Following her film debut in the 2004 comedy 13 Going on 30, she gained international recognition for starring as Hanna Marin in the Freeform drama thriller series Pretty Little Liars (2010–2017). During this time, she also continued to appear in films such as the crime comedy Spring Breakers (2012), the psychological horror Ratter (2015), the comedy drama Chronically Metropolitan (2016), and the musical drama Her Smell (2018). She has since starred in the films Private Property (2022), Mob Land (2023), and McVeigh (2024), as well as in the Amazon Prime Video psychological thriller miniseries Wilderness (2023).

Aside from acting, Benson has ventured into music, first in 2018 with the soundtrack of Her Smell, followed by her collaboration with G-Eazy in his cover of the Radiohead song "Creep" (2020).

== Early life ==
Ashley Benson was born on December 18, 1989, to parents Shannon and Jeff Benson. She has an older sister, Shaylene.

== Career ==
=== 2000s: Early work and recognition ===
Benson began dancing competitively at age three, studying ballet, jazz, tap and hip hop. She began singing in choirs and musicals at a young age, performing a solo at her church at age four. When she was eight years old she signed with Ford Models, and appeared in a number of print ads.

Benson appeared on the daytime soap Days of Our Lives as Abigail Deveraux from 2004 to 2007.

Benson made her big screen debut with a bit part in the 2004 comedy 13 Going on 30. She starred as Carson in Bring It On: In It to Win It (2007), the fourth installment of the Bring It On franchise. The role required her to both overcome her fear of heights to perform the cheerleading stunts, and to end her contract with Days of our Lives:

I got off it, I mean I had talked with the producers about doing this film, and they weren't going to let me do it... I had just passed up so many opportunities where I could have done a film. So this big thing just came up, and I ended up getting to do this. I'm happier that I got off the soap though. I mean I give all my credit to them, because I have learned so much from being on soap operas and working with amazing actors who've been on there for like thirty, forty years. It was an honor to work with them. It's definitely given me all my background. But getting off the soap opera helped me a lot too, because I can move on to bigger and better things. So I am definitely thankful I got to be on a soap opera though.

She recalled working on a film set instead of a soap opera set "definitely weird", because she would spend days working on one or two scenes, whereas on the Days of Our Lives set, she filmed two or three episodes a day. For Bring It On: In It to Win It, she had to attend cheerleading practice, which was "hard for [her], because [she is] afraid of heights." Nonetheless, she was "glad" to do her own stunts, even though she "wasn't expecting it to be so hard."

In 2008, she appeared in the Lifetime original film Fab Five: The Texas Cheerleader Scandal, where she played head cheerleader Brooke Tippit, a character loosely inspired by Karrissa Theret of the Fab Five. The film is based on a true story which took place at McKinney North High School in Texas. She became good friends with her onscreen mother Tatum O'Neal, from whom she learned about acting. Furthermore, she was excited to land a supporting role in Bart Got a Room, which aired mainly on film festivals in 2008 before having a limited release in 2009, because it allowed her to work with William H. Macy. She also played a witch disguised as a cheerleader in a 2008 episode of The CW series Supernatural.

In 2009, Benson starred in ABC's short-lived supernatural comedy television series Eastwick. The show was based on John Updike's novel, The Witches of Eastwick, and the 1987 film adaptation of the same name. The series only lasted 11 episodes before ABC cancelled the series due to low ratings but has since gained a cult following.

=== 2010s: Transition to drama and breakthrough ===
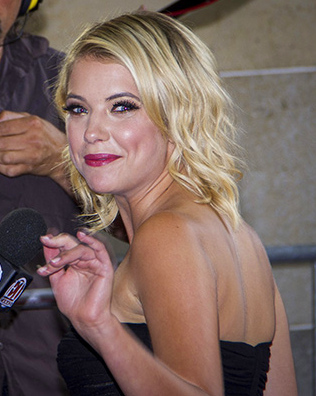
Benson in 2012

In December 2009, Benson was cast as Hanna Marin in the ABC Family mystery-thriller teen drama series Pretty Little Liars, based on the novel series by Sara Shepard. Hanna is the "diva" and "It girl" of the group, having taken Alison DiLaurentis' place as the most popular girl at Rosewood High in Alison's absence. The series premiered to 2.47 million viewers with Benson's performance being praised by critics. She also received a number of awards and nominations. Benson reprised the role in the spin-off series Ravenswood in two episodes.

In 2010, Benson starred in the television film Christmas Cupid alongside Christina Milian and Chad Michael Murray, which also aired on ABC Family. In January 2012, Benson was cast in the film Spring Breakers, after Emma Roberts dropped out due to creative reasons. The film centers on four college students who are arrested and bailed out by a drug and arms dealer, who sends them out to do some dirty work on spring break. The film co-starred Selena Gomez, Vanessa Hudgens, and James Franco. Filming took place in March and April 2012, and the film was released in March 2013.

In the January 21, 2013, episode of the CBS sitcom How I Met Your Mother, Benson appeared as Carly Whittaker, Barney Stinson's half-sister who dated Ted Mosby. That same month, Benson became the face of eveningwear designer Faviana.

She starred in the 2015 independent horror thriller film Ratter, playing Emma Taylor, a girl who is stalked through her technological devices. That same year, she also appeared in Pixels as Lady Lisa, a fictional game character brought to life. In 2016, Benson appeared in the biographical comedy-drama film Elvis & Nixon as Margaret.

In 2018, it was announced that Benson would star alongside Cara Delevingne and Elisabeth Moss in Alex Ross Perry's music drama film Her Smell, and the film received generally positive reviews. For the film's soundtrack, Benson did all her own vocals.

=== 2020s: Music ventures and later return to film ===
In 2020, Benson was featured on "Creep" by G-Eazy, a cover version of the Radiohead song. She also appeared in the music videos previously for NLT's "That Girl", One Call's "Black Light", and Hot Chelle Rae's "Honestly".

== Personal life ==
From 2018 to 2020, Benson was in a relationship with English model Cara Delevingne.

Benson's former co-star and friend Tyler Blackburn discussed the nature of their relationship in a 2019 interview. He said, "In navigating our relationship as co-workers and also as friends sometimes the lines blurred a little. We had periods when we felt more for each other." The pair ultimately remained good friends.

Benson dated rapper G-Eazy from 2020 to 2021. Since January 2023, Benson has been in a relationship with Brandon Davis, the grandson of late billionaire Marvin Davis. They got engaged in July 2023 and were married in November that year. In February 2024, they had their first child, a daughter.

She resides in Los Angeles.

== Filmography ==
=== Film ===
Year	Title	Role	Notes
2004	13 Going on 30	Six Chick	
2005	Neighbors	Mindy	Short film
2007	Bring It On: In It to Win It	Carson	Direct-to-video
2008	Bart Got a Room	Alice	
2012	Spring Breakers	Brit	
2015	Ratter	Emma Taylor	Also camera operator
2015	Pixels	Lady Lisa	
2016	Elvis & Nixon	Margaret	
2016	Chronically Metropolitan	Jessie	
2018	Her Smell	Roxie Rotten	
2018	Ask Me If I Care	Alice	Short film
2021	The Birthday Cake	Tracey	
2022	Private Property	Kathryn Carlyle	
2022	The Loneliest Boy in the World	Margot	
2022	Angry Neighbors	Amberson girl	
2023	Alone at Night	Vicky	Also producer
2023	Mob Land	Caroline Conners	
2024	McVeigh	Cindy	
2026	Pretty Babies	Sapphire	Also producer
TBA	Good Side of a Bad Man	Ruby	
TBA	Stranglehold	TBA	
TBA	Pledge Trip	Chief MAxime	

=== Television ===
Year	Title	Role	Notes
2002	The District	Melissa Howell	Episode: "Explicit Activities"
2002	The West Wing	Girl	Episode: "Game On"
2002	Nikki	Dancer	Episode: "Working Girl" (unaired)
2004	Strong Medicine	April	Episode: "Cape Cancer"
2004–2007	Days of Our Lives	Abigail Deveraux	Role held: November 12, 2004 – May 2, 2007
2005	7th Heaven	Margot	2 episodes
2005	Zoey 101	Candice	Episode: "Quinn's Date"
2006	The O.C.	Riley	Episode: "The Summer Bummer"
2008	Fab Five: The Texas Cheerleader Scandal	Brooke Tippit	Television film
2008	CSI: Miami	Amy Beck	Episode: "Bombshell"
2008	Supernatural	Tracy Davis	Episode: "It's the Great Pumpkin, Sam Winchester"
2009–2010	Eastwick	Mia Torcoletti	Main role
2010	Christmas Cupid	Caitlin Quinn	Television film
2010–2017	Pretty Little Liars	Hanna Marin	Main role, 160 episodes
2012	Punk'd	Herself	Episode: "Heather Morris"
2013	How I Met Your Mother	Carly Whittaker	Episode: "Ring Up!"
2013–2014	Ravenswood	Hanna Marin	Special guest star, 2 episodes
2014	Family Guy	Dakota (voice)	Episode: "Brian's a Bad Father"
2015	Barely Famous	Herself	Episode: "Bananas Foster"
2023	Wilderness	Cara Parker	Main role, 6 episodes

=== Web ===
Year	Title	Role	Notes
2011	CollegeHumor Originals	Ashley	Episode: "Secret Girl Language"
2020	Lady Parts	Herself	Episode: "How to Survive Puberty"
2021	Sorry Charlie Miller	Charlie Miller	Voice role; podcast series

=== Music videos ===
Year	Title	Artist(s)	Role	Ref.
2002	"True Love"	Lil' Romeo featuring Solange Knowles	Girl #1	
2007	"That Girl"	NLT	Love Interest	
2008	"We Don't Have to Look Back Now"	Puddle of Mudd	The Girlfriend	
2010	"Black Light"	One Call	Love Interest	
2012	"Honestly"	Hot Chelle Rae	Girl	
2019	"Can't Wait"	The Akergirls	Roxie Rotten	
2020	"Imagine"	Gal Gadot & Friends	Herself	

== Discography ==
Title	Year	Other artist(s)	Album
"Stars Go Out" (as Cindy Ultra)	2017	None	None
"Breathe"	2019	Elisabeth Moss, Agyness Deyn, Gayle Rankin, Cara Delevingne, Dylan Gelula and Amber Heard	Her Smell
"Can't Wait"	2019	Cara Delevingne and Dylan Gelula	Her Smell
"Creep"	2020	G-Eazy	None
"All the Things You're Searching For"	2020	G-Eazy and Kossisko	Everything's Strange Here

=== Songwriting credits ===
Title	Year	Artist(s)	Album	Credits	Written with
"Every Night of the Year"	2020	G-Eazy	Everything's Strange Here	Co-writer	Gerald Gillum, Dakarai Gwitira, John Michael Rouchell

== Awards and nominations ==
Year	Award	Category	Work	Result
2011	Young Hollywood Awards	Cast to Watch (with Troian Bellisario, Lucy Hale and Shay Mitchell)	Pretty Little Liars	Won
2011	Youth Rock Awards	Rockin' TV Actress	Pretty Little Liars	Won
2013	Alliance of Women Film Journalists Awards	Actress Most in Need of a New Agent (with Rachel Korine, Selena Gomez and Vanessa Hudgens)	Spring Breakers	Nominated
2013	Capricho Awards	Best Make Out (with James Franco and Vanessa Hudgens)	Spring Breakers	Nominated
2013	Capricho Awards	Best International Actress	Pretty Little Liars	Nominated
2014	MTV Movie Awards	Best Kiss (with James Franco and Vanessa Hudgens)	Spring Breakers	Nominated
2014	Teen Choice Awards	Choice Summer TV Star – Female	Pretty Little Liars	Won
2014	Teen Choice Awards	Candie's Choice Style Icon	Herself	Nominated
2015	People's Choice Awards	Favorite Cable TV Actress	Pretty Little Liars	Nominated
2015	Teen Choice Awards	Choice Summer TV Star: Female	Pretty Little Liars	Won
2016	People's Choice Awards	Favorite Cable TV Actress	Pretty Little Liars	Nominated
2016	Teen Choice Awards	Choice TV Actress: Drama	Pretty Little Liars	Won
2016	Teen Choice Awards	Choice TV: Chemistry (with Tyler Blackburn)	Pretty Little Liars	Won
2017	People's Choice Awards	Favorite Cable TV Actress	Pretty Little Liars	Nominated
2017	Teen Choice Awards	Choice TV Actress: Drama	Pretty Little Liars	Nominated
