= Shiloh Fernandez =

American actor (born 1985)

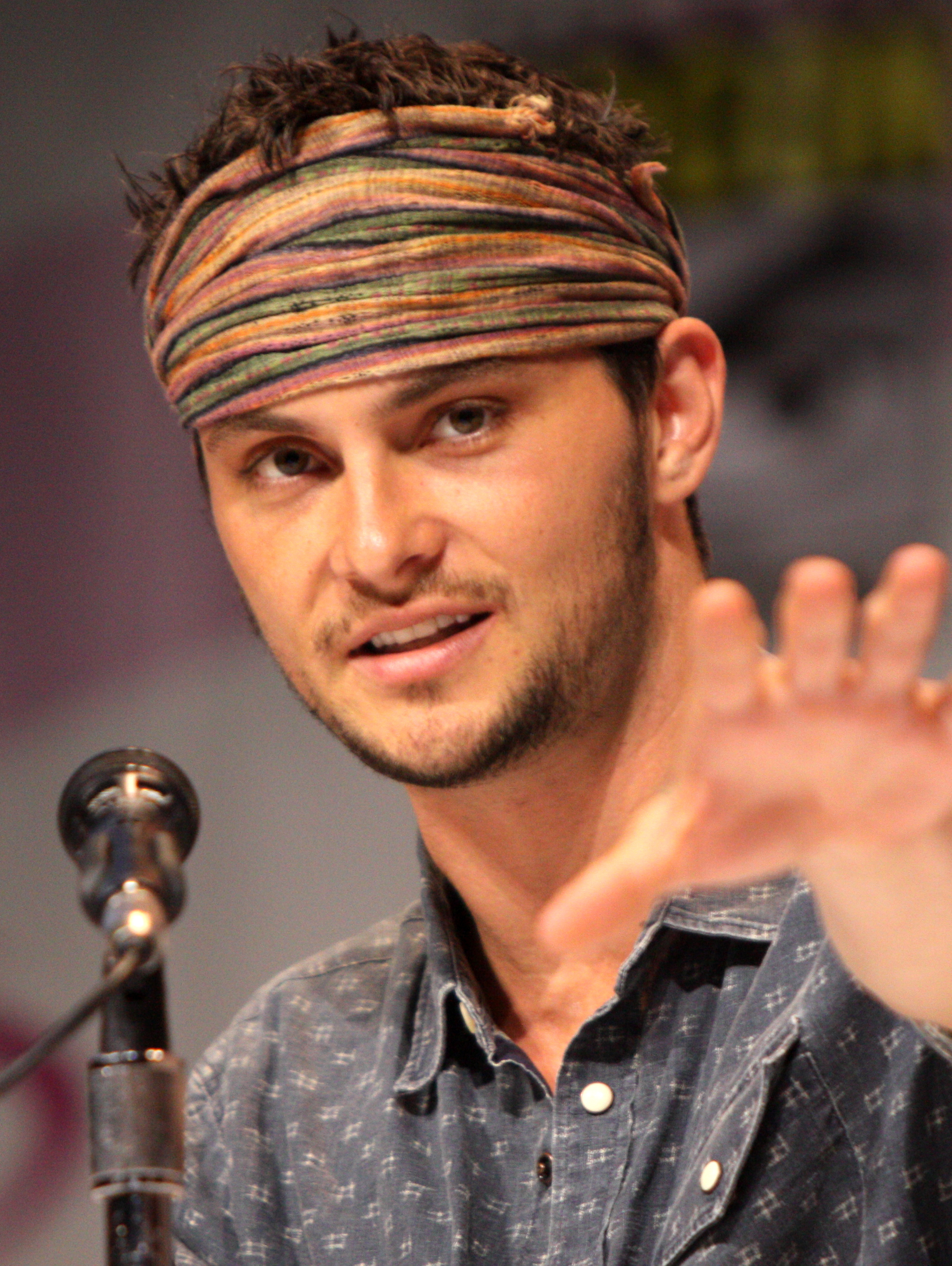
- Fernandez in March 2013
- Born: February 26, 1985 (age 41); Ukiah, California, U.S.
- Occupation: Actor
- Years active: 2005–present
- Spouse: Emily Tremaine (m. 2022)
- Children: 1

Shiloh Fernandez (born February 26, 1985) is an American actor. He is known for his roles in the television series Jericho and United States of Tara, and the films Deadgirl and Red Riding Hood, as well as for playing David Allen in the 2013 film Evil Dead and the 2022 video game Evil Dead: The Game.

== Early life ==
Fernandez was born in Ukiah, California. Fernandez's father is of half Portuguese and half Russian Jewish descent, whereas his mother has British ancestry. He has a younger sister and a brother. His stepfather is a contractor. Before becoming an actor, Fernandez began working as a dishwasher, and an American Apparel catalog model hand-picked by the company's CEO, Dov Charney, for his then-fledgling company. Later arriving in Los Angeles, he asked Charney for a job and was hired as a stock boy. His first acting gig was a commercial for First 5 California that was directed by Vadim Perelman.

== Career ==
=== 2006–10: early work ===
After completing a short film, Fernandez made his debut television appearance in a 2006 episode of Cold Case, followed by minor roles in Drake & Josh and Lincoln Heights. His screen debut came two years later, in 2007, when he landed the role of Edgar in Interstate before returning to TV. He landed his first recurring role in Jericho as Sean Henthorn between 2006 and 2007. The series was cancelled after just one season before a campaign by fans saw it return for a second before being cancelled once again.

In 2008, Fernandez became one of the front-runners to play Edward Cullen after he auditioned for Catherine Hardwicke in her Venice Beach garage, during the casting of Twilight. Fernandez was allegedly Hardwicke's first choice, but it was up to Kristen Stewart who had the last say. Shiloh later recalled on his narrowly missed opportunity, "At the time, it was just another audition. I didn't realize I was missing out on stardom and giant paychecks. Now, looking back on it, I certainly wouldn't have been mentally stable enough to deal with all that. Lucky for me, not getting that part led to other work that was a much better fit for me." Fernandez, who had no formal training, admitted being bashful around other actors during rehearsals. He did an array of television shows (CSI: NY, The United States of Tara) including starring in the Gossip Girl episode "Valley Girls" as Owen Campos, alongside Brittany Snow and Krysten Ritter. He eventually landed his first big break playing a troubled small-town Texas rink manager in the 2010 Sundance hit Skateland with Twilight alum Ashley Greene.

=== 2011–present: breakthrough ===
Though he lost the Twilight role to Robert Pattinson, Hardwicke liked Fernandez enough to cast him in what would be his first romantic lead, in Red Riding Hood, opposite Amanda Seyfried. The role became his Hollywood movie breakthrough, making him a hot commodity. MTV Networks' NextMovie.com named him one of the 'Breakout Stars to Watch for in 2011'. As he shot into the spotlight, he was the cover model of Nylon Guys' March 2011 issue, introducing him as "Hollywood's New Rebel", and was the cover man for the April/May 2011 issue of Da Man magazine.

In 2013, Fernandez starred in the remake of Evil Dead and in the independent film Syrup, based on the novel of the same name by Max Barry. In March 2015, Fernandez landed a role in the Canadian thriller film Edge of Winter, starring Rossif Sutherland, Joel Kinnaman, Tom Holland, Percy Hynes-White and Rachelle Lefevre.

== Personal life ==
His favorite movie of all time is The Thing Called Love and River Phoenix is his idol. Fernandez has stated that if he were not acting, he would have majored in Spanish, moved to South America, and run a banana farm or worked in construction, because he is good with his hands; or, if he was better at it, a writer. Fernandez has an affinity for country music, and his dream role is to play a country music star. He is a friend of actor Thomas Dekker. He married his longtime girlfriend Emily Tremaine during a ceremony on October 8, 2022 at the Cavalli Estate in San Luis Obispo, California.

== Filmography ==
Film
Year	Title	Role	Notes
2005	Wa$ted	Kyle	Short film
2007	Crossroads: A Story of Forgiveness	Justin Gutierrez	Television film
2007	Interstate	Edgar	
2008	Red	Pete Doust	
2008	Gardens of the Night	Cooper	
2008	From Within	Sean	Uncredited
2008	Deadgirl	Rickie	
2008	The Warehouse Job	Richard	Short film
2008	Cadillac Records	Phil Chess	
2009	16 to Life	Rene	
2009	Don't Look Up	Garret	
2010	Skateland	Ritchie Wheeler	
2010	Swerve	Daniel	Short film
2010	Happiness Runs	Jake	
2011	Red Riding Hood	Peter	
2013	The East	Luca	
2013	Evil Dead	David Allen	
2013	Deep Powder	Danny	
2013	Syrup	Scat	
2013	Searching	Henry	Short film
2014	White Bird in a Blizzard	Phil	
2014	Queen of Carthage	Amos	Also producer and screenwriter
2015	Return to Sender	William Finn	
2015	We Are Your Friends	Ollie	
2016	Chronically Metropolitan	Fenton	
2016	Edge of Winter	Richard	
2016	Long Nights Short Mornings	James	
2019	Burn	Perry	
2021	The Birthday Cake	Gio	
2021	The Cleaner	Andrew Briggs	
2021	Our Father	Alex	Short film
2022	Big Gold Brick	Roy	
2022	Continue	Trenton	
2022	Private Property	Ben	Also producer
2022	Torn Hearts	Caleb Crawford	
2023	The Old Way	Boots	
2023	Mob Land	Shelby Conners	
2023	Desperation Road	Clint	
2026	The Odyssey	First Trojan	
2026	The Basics of Philosophy	Claude	Post-production

Television
Year	Title	Role	Notes
2006	Cold Case	Valentino	Episode: "One Night"
2006–2007	Jericho	Sean Henthorn	7 episodes
2007	Drake & Josh	Julio	Episode: "The Storm"
2007	Lincoln Heights	T.J.	Episode: "Baby Doe"
2008	CSI: NY	Jake Fairwick	Episode: "All in the Family"
2008	The Cleaner	Ray Crin Jr.	Episode: "Here Comes the Boom"
2009	United States of Tara	Benjamin Lambert	3 episodes (1 uncredited)
2009	Gossip Girl	Owen Campos	Episode: "Valley Girls"
2009	Three Rivers	Scott Becker	3 episodes (1 uncredited)
2015	Law & Order: Special Victims Unit	Scott Russo	Episode "Agent Provocateur"
2016	Falling Water	Levon	2 episodes
2017	Gypsy	Tom	4 episodes
2018	Instinct	Troy	Episode "Long Shot"
2019	Euphoria	Trevor	2 episodes
2022	The Rookie	Cruz Lopez	Episode: "The Fugitive"

Music videos
Year	Title	Artist	Notes	Ref.
2008	"Just Impolite"	Plushgun		
2008	"Ride"	Cary Brothers		
2011	"We Still Burn"	Top Shelf	Also director	
2012	"Let's Forget All the Things That We Say"	Julia Stone		
2012	"Testosterone"	Haziq and the Giggles		
2014	"Are You Okay?"	Dum Dum Girls		
2014	"The Heart Wants What It Wants"	Selena Gomez		
2023	"We Don't Fight Anymore"	Carly Pearce featuring Chris Stapleton		

Video games
Year	Title	Role	Notes
2022	Evil Dead: The Game	David Allen	Voice role
