= Long Nights Short Mornings =

- Film poster
- Directed by: Chadd Harbold
- Written by: Chadd Harbold
- Produced by: Dan Berk; Michael W. Gray; Robert Olsen; Alex Sagalchik
- Starring: Shiloh Fernandez
- Cinematography: David Feeney-Mosier
- Edited by: Bryan Gaynor
- Music by: Redding Hunter
- Distributed by: The Orchard
- Release date: March 12, 2016 (South by Southwest)
- Running time: 100 minutes
- Country: United States
- Language: English

Long Nights Short Mornings is a 2016 American romantic drama film starring Shiloh Fernandez. An examination of the romantic life of a young man in New York City and his sometimes fleeting, sometimes profound experiences with the women he encounters.

== Cast ==
- Shiloh Fernandez as James
- Addison Timlin as Rapunzel
- Natalia Dyer as Marie
- Stella Maeve as Lily
- Paten Hughes as Monica
- Helen Rogers as Lorraine
- Ella Rae Peck as Katie
- Christine Evangelista as Natalie
- Cassandra Freeman as Anna
