= Chadd Harbold =

American filmmaker

- Born: United States
- Education: New York University
- Occupation: Filmmaker

Chadd Harbold is an American filmmaker. He has directed the feature films Revenge for Jolly! (2012), Long Nights Short Mornings (2016) and Private Property (2022).

Harbold is from Upper Arlington, Ohio. He attended high school in Upper Arlington and graduated from New York University.

== Filmography as director ==
- Revenge for Jolly! (2012)
- How to Be a Man (2013)
- Long Nights Short Mornings (2016)
- Private Property (2022)
