= Machine Man (novel) =

2011 novel by Max Barry

- First edition
- Author: Max Barry
- Cover artist: Matt Roeser
- Language: English
- Genre: Novel, Thriller, Science fiction
- Publisher: Vintage
- Publication date: 9 August 2011
- Publication place: Australia
- Media type: Print Paperback & E-book
- Pages: 288 pp (Paperback)
- ISBN: 0-307-47689-8 (Paperback)
- OCLC: 687652342
- Dewey Decimal: 813/.54 22
- LC Class: PS3552.A7424 M31 2011
- Preceded by: Company
- Followed by: Lexicon

Machine Man is a novel written by Max Barry. Published in 2011, it is Barry's fourth novel, following 2006's Company. It was initially an online serial, before being updated and published in 2011 by Vintage Books. The film rights have been picked up by Mandalay Pictures.

== Characters ==
- Dr. Charles Neumann – mechanical engineer
- Dr. Angelica Austin – Charles Neumann's medical doctor
- Lola Shanks – Physical Therapist and Charles Neumann's love interest
- Cassandra Cautery – A middle manager, Better Future
- Carl LaRussos – Security Guard, Better Future
- The Manager – Better Future's CEO

== Synopsis ==
Charles Neumann is a mechanical engineer working at Better Future, a military research company. After losing one of his legs in a hydraulic clamp, he begins to tinker with leg prosthetics. The replacements he builds are so advanced that he amputates his remaining leg in order to make full use of them. Better Futures provides him with his own research division in cybernetics, first aimed at selling medical prosthetics, then at augmentations for private customers and finally at creating augmented soldiers. This eventually leads him to accidentally cut off his hand. Meanwhile, his assistants invent all new things involving the body. He falls in love with Lola, and befriends his bodyguard Carl.

Over the course of events, Neumann gradually replaces more body parts with machinery, suffering various psychological side effects in the process. After first being rebuilt from the neck down as a machine soldier, his mind is eventually uploaded into a computer.
