= One Call =

Boy band in North America and Europe

- One Call in 2010

Background information
- Origin: North America, Europe
- Genres: Pop
- Years active: 2009-2011
- Label: Jive
- Formed by: Johnny Wright
- Past members: Justin "JJ" Thorne; Anthony "AG" Gamlieli; Chris Moy; Jose Bordonada

One Call was a boy band featuring Justin "JJ" Thorne, Anthony "AG" Gamlieli, Chris Moy, and Jose Bordonada. Johnny Wright—a music executive who has managed successful groups such as Backstreet Boys, 'NSync, and the Jonas Brothers—brought the band together from all over the country. Rodney "Darkchild" Jerkins became their producer. Their dances were choreographed by Laurianne Gibson.

Bordonada and Gemlieli left the group in 2011, and the group subsequently disbanded. They also were dropped by Jive Records before their closure, and their debut album was canceled.

== Members ==
- Anthony "A.G" Gamlieli is from Puyallup, Washington. He was born in Graham, Washington. He attended Graham Elementary, Frontier Jr. High, Graham-Kapowsin High School (for 3 months), Bethel Online & Orting High School (for 2 Months). Growing up, Gamlieli had a dancing family. His parents owned/ own Elite School of Dance in Puyallup, Washington. He and his sister, Amalitta, were both heavily involved in dance competitions in and around the Seattle area. He won 1st place Overall with his Hip-Hop solos, in majority of the dance competitions he attended between 2006 & 2008. He won 1st place in hiphop battles, 3 separate years at Monsters of Hiphop (Junior & Teen Divisions); His first Manager was Joy Robson (Wade Robson's Mom). He appeared on the TV Series "Dance Revolution" with his dance partner Ashton Grant, who was also managed by Joy Robson. From their, Anthony entered into a boyband managed by Kenneth Crear (Johnny Wright's Business Partner), where he was accompanied by his band mates Anthony Ladao (Midnight Red), Adam Sevani (Step Up), and Max Ostrowski. The band disbanded after a couple years and Anthony went back to his home state for a brief period; Only returning to LA intermittently to record with Rodney Jerkins on some demos as a solo artist. He then returned to the boyband scene when he received a call from his manager (Kenneth Crear) that his business partner (Johnny Wright) was starting another boy band, after both NLT & Menudo broke up soon after their Bandemonium tour. AG would enter the group as "The New Guy". The honeymoon didn't last long. His prior relationship with Rodney Jerkins, and overwhelming attention from the fans, fueled a jealous rift within the band. When Justin Thorne took over the bands production, AG was intentionally left out of vocal leads, publishing and songwriting; deepening the rift in the bands chemistry. When One Call released their single "Blacklight", Kendall Jenner was featured as AG's video girl for the music video. Several months after Blacklight was released, as the bands chemistry worsened, AG announced his exit from the band. Today, He teaches at his families Dance studio, primarily teaching Gymnastics, as well as all other forms of dance, occasionally.
- Justin "J.J" Thorne is an actor, dancer, producer, and musician from Los Angeles, CA. He was born in Canyon Country, CA to director Rich Thorne. Justin was also a member of NLT, along with Glee's Kevin McHale, and also toured with The Pussycat Dolls. Justin has made numerous appearances in various films and television shows as an extra, such as Disney's That's So Raven, Dr. Dolittle 3, and Will & Grace. He was also a part of Learn to Hip Hop: Volumes 2&3 as himself, as well as appearing briefly with the rest NLT in Bratz: The Movie.
- Christopher Nelson Moy is from the Bronx, NY. He and fellow One Call Member, José Bordonada were a part of the MTV series "Making Menudo", which was about their band. Chris and Jose then formed two-fifths of the Latin Boy band by the name of Menudo.
- José Bordonada is from Manati, Puerto Rico. A self-confessed "Talent Show Kid", has been singing since he was 5 and started dancing when he was 11. Former member of the boy band Menudo.

== Music videos ==
The song BlackLight, one of their biggest hits, was made into a video in which stars from many television shows were in. The video took three days to perform, in which they practiced eight to ten hours a day. Kendall Jenner from Keeping Up With The Kardashians, Ashley Benson from Pretty Little Liars, and Kevin McHale from Glee among others star in this video. One Call states they had so many other stars in order to make it "fun" for the viewers.

== Other tours ==
=== Circus ===
One Call opened for Britney Spears in 2009 for her Circus tour. They opened nine shows for Britney. One Call opened six shows on the East Coast and three shows in Madison Square Garden. They did the Circus tour after being a band for only six months.
