= Skateland =

2010 film by Anthony Burns

- Theatrical release poster
- Directed by: Anthony Burns
- Written by: Anthony Burns; Brandon Freeman; Heath Freeman
- Produced by: Brandon Freeman; Heath Freeman; Anthony Burns; Justin Gilley; Nicholas Jayanty; Victor Moyers
- Starring: Shiloh Fernandez; Ashley Greene; Heath Freeman; Brett Cullen; Melinda McGraw; Taylor Handley
- Cinematography: Peter Simonite
- Edited by: Robert Hoffman
- Music by: Michael Penn
- Production company: Freeman Film
- Distributed by: Freestyle Releasing
- Release dates: January 25, 2010 (Sundance); May 13, 2011 (United States)
- Running time: 94 minutes
- Country: United States
- Language: English
- Box office: $19,411

Skateland is a 2010 American drama film written and directed by Anthony Burns and stars Shiloh Fernandez, Ashley Greene, Heath Freeman, Brett Cullen, Melinda McGraw and Taylor Handley. It premiered at the Sundance Film Festival in January 2010. The film was released in the United States Freestyle Releasing on May 13, 2011.

== Plot ==
The story takes place in a small town in Texas in 1983. The film follows a 19-year-old boy named Ritchie Wheeler who spends most of his time at the local roller rink where he works and hangs out with his friends, Brent Burkham (Heath Freeman), Brent's sister Michelle and Kenny Crawford. Ritchie is struggling trying to figure out his future, what he wants to do with his life and if he wants to go to college. When a tragedy occurs in Ritchie's life he is forced to make these decisions earlier than he expected.

== Cast ==
- Shiloh Fernandez as Ritchie Wheeler
- Ashley Greene as Michelle Burkham
- Heath Freeman as Brent Burkham
- Brett Cullen as David Wheeler
- Melinda McGraw as Debbie Wheeler
- Taylor Handley as Kenny Crawford
- Haley Ramm as Mary Wheeler
- A. J. Buckley as Teddy Tullos
- Ellen Hollman as Deana Trammel
- James LeGros as Clive Burkham
- Casey LaBow as Candy Boyce
- D. W. Moffett as steakhouse manager
- David Sullivan as Luther

== Production ==
Principal photography took place in Texas and Louisiana from October 2008 to December 2008.

== Release ==
Skateland premiered at the Sundance Film Festival on January 25, 2010. It was released on May 13, 2011 by Freestyle Releasing and grossed $19,411.

== Reception ==
On the review aggregator website Rotten Tomatoes, 47% of 30 critics' reviews are positive, with an average rating of 5.3/10. Metacritic, which uses a weighted average, assigned the film a score of 51 out of 100, based on 13 critics, indicating "mixed or average" reviews.
