= Christmas Cupid =

2010 television film by Gil Junger

- Promotional poster
- Written by: Aury Wallington
- Directed by: Gil Junger
- Starring: Christina Milian; Ashley Benson; Chad Michael Murray; Jackée Harry; Ashley Johnson; Burgess Jenkins
- Music by: Richard Gibbs
- Country of origin: United States
- Original language: English

Production
- Producers: Jody Brockway; Craig McNeil
- Cinematography: Dave Perkal
- Running time: 85 minutes
- Production company: ABC Family

Original release
- Network: ABC Family
- Release: December 12, 2010

Christmas Cupid is a 2010 American fantasy romantic comedy television film directed by Gil Junger and starring Christina Milian, Ashley Benson, and Chad Michael Murray. It premiered on ABC Family on December 12, 2010, as part of their 25 Days of Christmas programming block. It was filmed under the name Ex-Mas Carol.

== Plot ==
Sloane Spencer is an ambitious and self-involved publicist in Los Angeles planning the premiere of her client Caitlin Quinn’s (Benson) new movie, Snow Angel, on Christmas. Sloane must make the event perfect in order to beat her ex-boyfriend Jason for a promotion to Vice President, even though Sloane is dating her boss Andrew, whose family owns the company. Sloane makes plans to work all of Christmas Day rather than spend time with her mother, Vivian, or have dinner with her friend Jenny and her husband Ed at their struggling restaurant.

When Caitlin chokes to death on the olive from a martini, her ghost visits Sloane, warning that she needs to change her ways or pay the price. Later, Andrew calls Sloane with the news that Caitlin has died. Sloane goes to the hospital to see the body for herself and runs into her ex-boyfriend Patrick (Murray), who is a doctor at the hospital. Upon seeing Caitlin's body, Sloane worries about the implications for the movie premiere.

The next day, Caitlin's ghost continues to follow Sloane around, interfering in her life. Andrew puts Sloane in charge of Caitlin's memorial, which Sloane decides to combine with the movie premiere. Consequently, everyone at the office has to work overtime, even on Christmas Day. Patrick calls Sloane and asks her out on a date, but she puts off having to give him an answer.

At midnight that night, Sloane is visited by the spirit of "ex-mas past", her first boyfriend, Brad, who shows Sloane how her mother shaped Sloane's materialistic ways; he also reveals that Sloane left Patrick to focus on her career, right before he was going to propose. Since then, she has dated several men, always leaving when it started to become serious. Finally, Brad breaks the news to Sloane that Andrew is cheating on her.

The next day, Sloane dumps Andrew after he admits to cheating on her. Later, Sloane is only worried about how it will affect her career, making her competition with Jason for the promotion heat up even more. Sloane decides to use her dinner reservations that she had with Andrew to have dinner with Patrick instead. On the date, as Sloane and Patrick are about to kiss, Andrew arrives and proposes to Sloane. She says yes, completely forgetting about Patrick.

At midnight that night, Caitlin and the spirit of "ex-mas present", Jason, show Sloane how her thoughtlessness and self-absorption affects those around her. Sloane observes her secretary Ella (Cara Montella) telling her son that she will not be home on Christmas Day, Jenny and Ed talking about how Sloane takes Jenny for granted, and Vivian finding out that her husband will not be home for Christmas and she will be spending it completely alone. Last, Sloane discovers that Andrew was actually on the phone while talking to her about their engagement and sees how upset Patrick was. Both Caitlin's ghost and Jason's spirit want to show Sloane that if she does not change, she is going to end up alone.

The next day, Sloane attempts to fix the relationships in her life. She admits to Jenny that she forgot to put the gift certificates to help Jenny's restaurant in the gift baskets. Sloane then visits Patrick, who tells her that he "could never fall in love with her now".

As she is leaving the hospital, Sloane is visited by the spirit of "ex-mas future", who is dressed like Santa Claus. Sloane visits her mother's house where the maid is trying to convince Vivian to spend Christmas with her family, to no avail. She is spending Christmas alone with her dogs, one of whom she named after Sloane. She questions her mother's mental stability as she always seen Sloane as a person despite the two other dogs being considered her younger brothers. She learns that Vivian's marriage to her last husband fell apart and, since the dogs seem to love her more than Sloane does, Vivian has come to depend on them for support. Next, Sloane visits the future home of Jenny and Ed where they receive a Christmas card from her, which Jenny refuses to read. She discovers that Jenny's restaurant has failed, and she is now a waitress at Applebee's. Sloane also learns that, because her thoughtlessness, Jenny ended their friendship. Finally, Sloane visits the hospital, where she learns that she never sees Patrick again after accepting Andrew's proposal, and that he believes she is shallow and selfish. Sloane insists that she does care about love, and since she and Andrew are engaged, he would never become her ex. The spirit laughs at her and reveals himself to be Andrew, her future ex-husband, who left her because she valued her career more than him.

Inside the hospital, Sloane observes how happy the patients are to have family visit them on Christmas. Slone learns from Andrew that no one came to visit her because they were angry over how she willfully abandoned them in their time of need. As a result, she died alone, just as Jason and Caitlin predicted. Sloane begs Andrew to help her, but he refuses, saying she got what she deserved. Before leaving, Andrew suggests that had Sloane been more caring towards others, she would not have ended up alone.

Sloane wakes up on Christmas Day, determined to fix her life. First, she reconciles with her mother and goes to Jenny's for dinner. Then she goes to the movie premiere/memorial, where she lets Ella go home for the day; and puts all the gift certificates for Jenny's restaurant in the gift baskets. The event is a success and Sloane gets the promotion to Vice President. Once Andrew decides to tell her the good news, Sloane finds a Bluetooth speaker in his ear. Discovering that he had secretly spied on her and Patrick at the restaurant with the woman he cheated on her with, she dumps him. Having accomplished her mission, Caitlin gets her wings and goes up to Heaven after saying goodbye to Sloane. As Sloane is leaving, she and Jason make peace.

At the hospital, Sloane apologizes to Patrick and professes her love for him. Patrick is doubtful and upset that she embarrassed him in public. Sloane tells him that she and Andrew are done for good and she realizes how much she hurt Patrick. In the end, Patrick forgives her and joins her at Jenny's for dinner, where Sloane makes a Christmas toast, surrounded by her loved ones.

== Cast ==
- Christina Milian as Sloane Spencer (based on Ebenezer Scrooge)
- Ashley Benson as Caitlin Quinn (based on Jacob Marley)
- Chad Michael Murray as Patrick (based on Belle)
- Jackée Harry as Vivian (similar to Scrooge's father and Nephew Fred)
- Ashley Johnson as Jenny (another character based on Nephew Fred)
- Burgess Jenkins as Andrew as the Ghost of Christmas Future
- Patrick Johnson as Brad as the Ghost of Christmas Past
- Ryan Sypek as Jason as the Ghost of Christmas Present
- Justin Smith as Ed
- Cara Mantella as Ella (based on Bob Cratchit)

== Reception ==
During its broadcast premiere, the film averaged 3.4 million viewers.

== See also ==
- List of films about angels
- List of Christmas films
