= Company (novel) =

2006 Novel by Max Barry

- Company novel cover
- Author: Max Barry
- Language: English
- Genre: Novel, Satire
- Published: 17 January 2006 Doubleday
- Publication place: Australia
- Media type: Print (Hardback & Paperback) & e-book
- Pages: 336 pp (hardcover edition)
- ISBN: 0-385-51439-5 (hardcover edition)
- OCLC: 60589155
- Dewey Decimal: 813/.54 22
- LC Class: PS3552.A7424 C66 2006
- Preceded by: Jennifer Government
- Followed by: Machine Man

Company is a 2006 novel by Max Barry. It is Barry's third published novel, following Jennifer Government in 2003. The novel is set in a modern corporation.

== Plot summary ==
Set in Seattle at a company called Zephyr Holdings Incorporated, the plot is centered in a drab building from which it is difficult to discern the company's type of business. The company's defining characteristic is its obscurity and its heavy reliance on corporate jargon, through which it avoids hard truths and harsh realities.

Stephen Jones, a young graduate, reports for his first day in the Training Sales Department shortly after there has been a theft of a precious resource in the office, a doughnut. Among the overarching plot-lines, Roger's assumption of the role of detective in solving the mystery of the missing doughnut stretches the length of the plot. Jones is promoted from assistant to acting sales representative on the whim of his manager, over the heads of his far more experienced colleagues. As time passes and the inanities mount, Jones comes to believe in the existence of a conspiracy, given the logical fallacies of his work, selling orders to different floors of the same company. A meeting with upper management is impossible without an appointment, an appointment is impossible without the consent of mid-level managers, and managers fire anyone who ask questions outside the lines of preferred company policy. Employees are shuffled about at random or outsourced in cost-cutting maneuvers, and the theme of cost-consolidation is heavy throughout.

Reaching the CEO's floor by using a locked staircase, Jones reaches the epiphany necessary to pierce the veil of the sham that is Zephyr: the CEO's floor is the empty roof, and the real work behind the scenes takes place on the unreachable floor 13. The CEO, Daniel Klausman, poses as a lowly janitor ordinarily but secretly orchestrates lab-based tests on the employees of Zephyr in order to best reach maximum efficiency in a corporate environment. A select group of people, known as the Alphas, remain in Zephyr to analyze if their strategies result in perceivable results, and Jones finds himself swept into the Alphas. The main revenue stream comes from the sale of the Omega Management System series of corporate self-help books, based on the results of the studies done on the Zephyr employees.

Disgusted by its inhumanity and its dedication to impossible and cruel ideals, Jones resolves to bring down the Alpha group and thus Zephyr Holdings from within. Simultaneously, he is both heavily attracted to the beautiful Eve Jantiss and repulsed by her open cynicism towards the employees of Zephyr and her easy disregard for common ethics in the corporate environment. Left to its own ends, Zephyr Holdings continuously down-sizes in cost-saving moves, only to be confused when the company's per person costs rise since there are fewer employees. This spirals out of control until Zephyr holdings becomes a tribal battleground, with each executive seizing the best parts of the pie to control and manipulate, leaving a bloated Senior Management with absurdly small number of actual employees. Sick of the rampant ineptitude and trimming which leaves only the incompetent and corrupt working, Jones organizes a revolt with the remaining employees to force the Senior Management to resign, to which the Alpha group is powerless to respond lest it reveal its actual, devious purpose. However, although left without a head and most of its limbs, the Alpha group continues to believe that the experiment of the Zephyr Corporation does not need to be cancelled and can remain viable. In a final act of defiance, Jones links the secret floor 13 with the rest of the building so all the employees can read the files made about them and tests done to ascertain minute results. Infuriated, the Zephyr Corporation employees riot and storm floor 13, resulting in the implosion of the fake company.

In the aftermath of the fall of Zephyr Holdings Incorporated, Jones and Eve meet again, finding that the two of them never really changed, with the latter bemusedly certain that Corporations would not be able to learn from their own mistakes, and the former adamant that the most essential part of the company was not its profits but the people that made up its lifeblood, the employees.

== Characters in Company ==
- Stephen Jones – Training Sales Dept. "Graduate"; Roger Jefferson's Sales Assistant
- Sydney Harper – Training Sales Dept. Manager
- Megan Jackson – Training Sales Dept. Personal Assistant
- Elizabeth Miller – Training Sales Dept. Sales Rep 1
- Holly Vale – Training Sales Dept., Elizabeth Miller's Sales Assistant
- Wendell Hartford – Training Sales Dept. Sales Rep 2
- Freddy Carlson – Wendel Hartfords's Sales Assistant
- Roger Jefferson – Training Sales Dept. Sales Rep 3
- Eve Jantiss – Receptionist
- Blake Seddon – Senior Management
- Daniel Klausman – CEO

== Publication history ==
After the novel's initial publication by Doubleday in 2006 it was reprinted as follows:

- 2007 Scribe Publishing, Australia
- 2007 Vintage Books, USA

It was also translated into German in 2006, Dutch in 2007 and Portuguese in 2008.

== Film, TV or theatrical adaptations ==
Universal Pictures has acquired screen rights to the novel, which Steve Pink will adapt. Tom Shadyac and Michael Bostick will produce the film through Shady Acres.
