= Chronically Metropolitan =

- Theatrical release poster
- Directed by: Xavier Manrique
- Written by: Nicholas Schutt
- Produced by: Jamin O'Brien; Chuy Hernandez; Daniel Blanc
- Starring: Shiloh Fernandez; Ashley Benson; Addison Timlin; Josh Peck; Chris Noth; Mary-Louise Parker
- Cinematography: Scott Miller
- Edited by: Susan E. Morse; Juan Pablo Cadaveira
- Music by: Angelo Milli
- Production companies: The Film Community; Chron NY, Inc.; Planeo Films
- Distributed by: Paladin
- Release dates: June 24, 2016 (Nantucket Film Festival); August 4, 2017 (United States)
- Running time: 90 minutes
- Country: United States
- Language: English

Chronically Metropolitan is a 2016 American comedy-drama film directed by Xavier Manrique and written by Nicholas Schutt. The film stars Ashley Benson, Shiloh Fernandez, Addison Timlin, Mary-Louise Parker and Chris Noth. Filming began on February 23, 2015, in New York City.

== Cast ==
- Shiloh Fernandez as Fenton
- Ashley Benson as Jessie
- Addison Timlin as Layla
- Mary-Louise Parker as Annabel
- Chris Noth as Christopher
- Josh Peck as John

== Production ==
It was first announced on January 29, 2015, that Jamin O'Brien and Daniel L. Blanc would produce the film.

=== Filming ===
Filming began on February 23, 2015, in New York City, where actors were spotted filming around Manhattan. Later in March, filming was taking place on location in Brooklyn.

== Reception ==
=== Critical response ===
On review aggregator Rotten Tomatoes the film has a rating of 40% based on 10 reviews and an average rating of 6.12/10.
