= Syrup (film) =

- Directed by: Aram Rappaport
- Written by: Aram Rappaport; Max Barry
- Based on: Syrup by Max Barry
- Produced by: Cameron Lamb; Barrie M. Osborne; Susan A. Stover
- Starring: Amber Heard; Shiloh Fernandez; Kellan Lutz; Brittany Snow
- Cinematography: Julio Macat
- Edited by: Robert Hoffman
- Music by: Peter Bateman; Andrew Holtzman; Paul Saunderson
- Production company: Lila 9th Productions
- Distributed by: Magnolia Pictures
- Release date: June 7, 2013 (US)
- Running time: 90 min
- Country: United States
- Language: English
- Budget: $2.5 million (estimated)
- Box office: $663

Syrup is a 2013 American comedy drama film directed by Aram Rappaport and based on the 1999 novel of the same name by Max Barry. Its video on demand release date was on May 1, 2013, and its US theater release date was on June 7, 2013.

== Plot ==
A young man named Scat comes up with a new idea for a drink after he drops his drink and swears, calling it 'FUKK'. He goes to Addison Cola Company where he maneuvers a meeting with a formidable marketing executive, Six, by triggering the fire alarm. While mediocre, she tells him that she and her team will polish it before it is presented to the board. During the meeting, the board shows some resistance but Six informs them that Scat is willing to give up trademark provisions for a mere two million. Scat then realizes he has not reserved the trademark and scrambles to the Patent and Trademark Office only to find out that his roommate, Sneaky Pete, stole his idea and registered it earlier that morning.

Success befalls Pete as 'FUKK' becomes the highest-selling energy drink in the nation. Embittered, Scat goes back to his ordinary life but is later recruited by Six to help her come up with a new ad campaign after she is booted off the 'FUKK' campaign and relegated to Addy Classics. Instructed to come up with a brilliant idea by Friday (only five days away), Scat moves in with Six and is unable to think of anything until moments before the deadline. After shaking a vending machine in frustration and Six telling him that twelve people have died by being crushed by vending machines, he comes up with the idea of 'Wouldn't you die for a Fukk' advertising a cartoon where people die by being crushed by vending machines because they want the drink so badly. The ad is accepted and aired but a young teenager dies by being crushed by a vending machine and the ad is now considered insensitive and taken off air. Scat and Six attend the funeral and when Scat makes a speech, Six points out that all the mourners are actors that she recognizes from ads. Scat quickly realizes that Sneaky Pete created this fake death to get their ad to fail, and he quickly pulls out the fake body from the coffin and holds it up for all to see.

Scat is fired while believing that Six remains at the company. In reality, Six quit when Addison refused to keep Scat, now working at a shoe store. After a brief stint as a rickshaw driver, Scat is hired by a rival company, and Six is also poached. As Scat and Six are being hired Six drops a name tag from her work, possibly revealing a glimpse of her real name (appearing to be Elizabeth), before she quickly covers and retrieves the name tag. The two must come up with a new drink idea and after talking about their attraction for each other, Scat comes up with the 'Average KOK'. He presents this as a drink to the board and also thinks of a different drink just called 'KOK' that they give to celebrities. The normal 'KOK's are numbered up to 100 and each number represents a celebrity and the celebrity deems who can drink their numbered drink. After the frenzy for the drink that they can't have, Scat and the company decide to make the drink go public but not before the suicide of a teenager who killed himself after not being 'cool' enough to drink his lucky number 17's corresponding drink. After confirming that this time the death is real, Scat goes on TV to apologize but ends up pointing out that drink sales have never been higher even after the death and that people, like him, 'have a dream'. Scat walks along watching himself on the TV displays and Six finds him. Scat tells her his real name is 'Michael' and asks for her real name. They kiss, but Six insists that "Six" is her name. Scat says, "It's been a pleasure doing business with you, Six," and walks away.

== Cast ==
- Amber Heard as Six, the Addy marketing executive
- Shiloh Fernandez as Scat, the protagonist
- Kellan Lutz as Sneaky Pete, Scat's former roommate and company rival
- Brittany Snow as Three, Pete's assistant
- Josh Pais as Davidson
- Kate Nash as Beth
- Rachel Dratch as Clerk
- Adam LeFevre as Priest
- Christopher Evan Welch as Davies
- Zachary Booth as Chet
- Kirstie Alley as herself

This was Christopher Evan Welch's final film role before his death 6 months later.

== Reception ==
Rotten Tomatoes gives the film a critic score of 25% based on reviews from 8 critics, with an average rating of 4/10.
