= Mob Land =

2023 American film by Nicholas Maggio

- Official release poster
- Directed by: Nicholas Maggio
- Screenplay by: Nicholas Maggio
- Story by: Nicholas Maggio; Rob Healy
- Produced by: Corey Large; Bernie Gewissler
- Starring: Shiloh Fernandez; Stephen Dorff; Ashley Benson; Kevin Dillon; John Travolta
- Cinematography: Nick Matthews
- Edited by: Bryan Gaynor
- Music by: David Gerald Steinberg
- Production company: 308 Entertainment
- Distributed by: Saban Films
- Release date: August 4, 2023
- Running time: 111 minutes
- Country: United States
- Language: English
- Box office: $171

Mob Land is a 2023 American crime thriller film written and directed by Nicholas Maggio, in his feature film directorial debut. The film stars Shiloh Fernandez, Stephen Dorff, Ashley Benson, Kevin Dillon, and John Travolta. It was released by Saban Films on August 4, 2023.

== Premise ==
Deep in the heart of Dixie, in a small town struggling with the ravages of addiction, a local sheriff tries to maintain the peace when desperate family man Shelby robs a pill mill with his reckless brother-in-law, Trey, but the supposedly easy score takes a violent turn, alerting the New Orleans mafia's revenge-seeking enforcer, who threatens Shelby's wife and daughter.

Clayton Minor comes to Shelby and demands that he find the stolen money. Clayton strangles Trey in front of him. Clayton demands that Shelby murder the eyewitness, Ms. Whitney, in her bed. Clayton takes Shelby to his boss and shoots Shelby. Clayton then has a change of heart and shoots all the members of the mafia clan and brings the money to Shelby's widow. As he is about to smoke a cigarette outside the door, he is shot in the head and dies. Afterwards, only an arm in a red shirt, obviously belonging to Bodie Davis, is shown picking up the bullet casing.

== Cast ==
- Shiloh Fernandez as Shelby Connors, Caroline's husband
- John Travolta as Bodie Davis, a local sheriff
- Kevin Dillon as Trey, Caroline's brother and Shelby's brother-in-law
- Stephen Dorff as Clayton Minor, an enforcer for the New Orleans mafia
- Ashley Benson as Caroline Connors, Shelby's wife
- Tia DiMartino as Mila Connors, Caroline and Shelby's daughter
- Timothy V. Murphy as Ben, a deputy
- Robert Miano as Ellis
- Debra Nelson as Ms. Whitney
- Emily Tremaine Fernandez as Casey

== Production ==
In May 2022, John Travolta, Stephen Dorff, Ashley Benson, Kevin Dillon, and Shiloh Fernandez were announced to have starred in Nicholas Maggio's directorial debut film originally titled American Metal. Principal photography wrapped by May 2022 in Georgia. Saban Films bought the film's distribution rights during the 2022 Cannes Film Festival. The film was retitled to Mob Land.

== Release ==
Mob Land was released by Saban Films on August 4, 2023.

=== Box office ===
As of October 7, 2023, Mob Land grossed $171, in the United Kingdom.

=== Critical reception ===
On the review aggregator website Rotten Tomatoes, 50% of 32 critics' reviews are positive, with an average rating of 5.2/10. The website's consensus reads: "Game efforts from a solid cast make Mob Land more watchable than it might have been, but their work is often undermined by the movie's clichéd and convoluted plot." Metacritic, which uses a weighted average, assigned the film a score of 47 out of 100, based on 6 critics, indicating "mixed or average" reviews.
