= Coca-Cola BlāK =

Soft drink

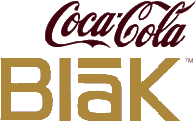

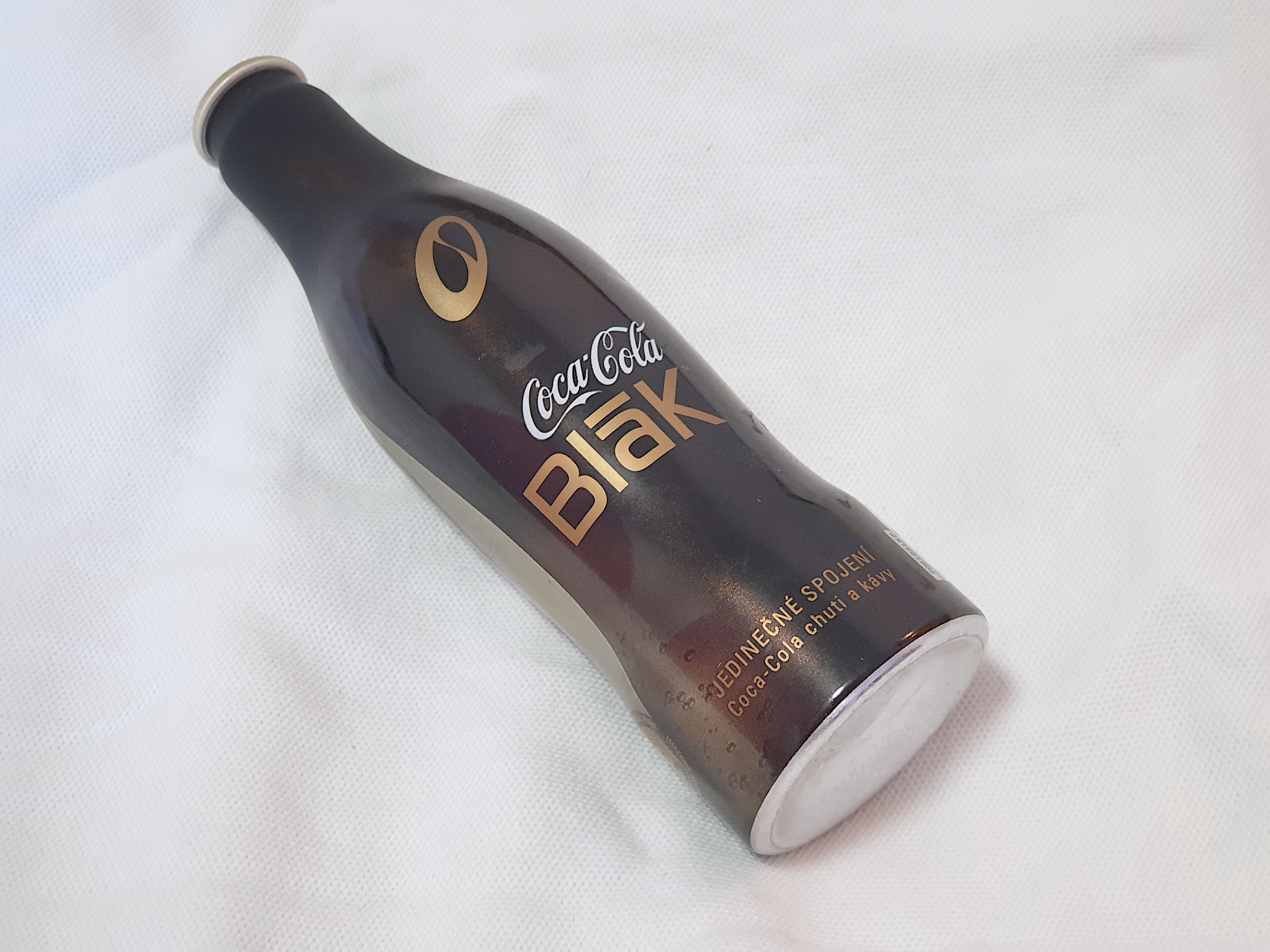
- Type: Coffee-flavored cola
- Manufacturer: The Coca-Cola Company
- Origin: France
- Introduced: 2006; 20 years ago
- Discontinued: 2008; 18 years ago
- Related products: Pepsi Tarik; Pepsi Cappuccino

Coca-Cola Blak (stylized as Coca-Cola BlāK) was a coffee-flavored cola introduced by The Coca-Cola Company in 2006 and discontinued in 2008. The mid-calorie drink was introduced first in France and subsequently in other markets, including Czech Republic, Slovakia, and Lithuania.

Coca-Cola Blak launched in the United States on April 3, and in Canada on August 29, 2006 in Toronto, Ontario, at Yonge–Dundas Square. In August 2007, trade magazine Beverage Digest noted that Coca-Cola would discontinue the drink within the United States.

The French and Canadian versions of Coca-Cola Blak were sweetened with sugar. The U.S. version of Coca-Cola Blak replaced sugar with high fructose corn syrup, aspartame, and acesulfame potassium. Consumer Reports taste-testers found the French version to be less sweet and to contain more coffee flavor.

The American and Canadian versions had a plastic resealable cap on a glass bottle that resembled the classic Coke bottle, where the French/Czech version was a bottle shape formed in aluminum.

In 2010, Coca-Cola FEMSA, the largest Coca-Cola bottler in Latin America, released coffee dispenser machines in Mexico under the brand name Blak.

In 2019, it was reported that Coca-Cola had started to plan an introduction of coffee-related products across 25 markets by the end of the year. The coffee has been planned to combine Coca-Cola with coffee, which will contain less caffeine than a regular cup of coffee but more than a regular can of Coke. This rollout, which started in European markets, culminated in the release of Coca-Cola with Coffee in the US on January 25, 2021.

== Nutritional facts ==
US Version
| | Coke BlāK (240mL/8 fl. oz) | Coke Classic (240mL/8 fl. oz) |
|---|---|---|
| Calories | 45 (190 kJ) | 97 (410 kJ) |
| Total Fat | 0g | 0 g |
| Sodium | 35 mg | 33 mg |
| Total Carb. | 13 g | 27 g |
| Sugars | 12 g | 27 g |
| Protein | 0 g | 0 g |
| Caffeine | 46 mg | 23 mg |

French Version
| | Coke BlāK (100mL/3.4 fl. oz) | Coke Classic (100mL/3.4 fl. oz) |
|---|---|---|
| Calories | 20 (84 kJ) | 42 (180 kJ) |
| Total Fat | 0 g | 0 g |
| Sodium | <50 mg | <50 mg |
| Total Carb. | 5 g | 10.6 g |
| Sugars | 5 g | 10.6 g |
| Protein | 0 g | 0 g |
| Caffeine | 20 mg | 10 mg |

== See also ==
- Coffee-flavored Pepsi
- Syrup, a 1999 novel featuring a plot revolving around a fictional but similar product
