= Kevin McHale (actor) =

American actor and singer (born 1988)

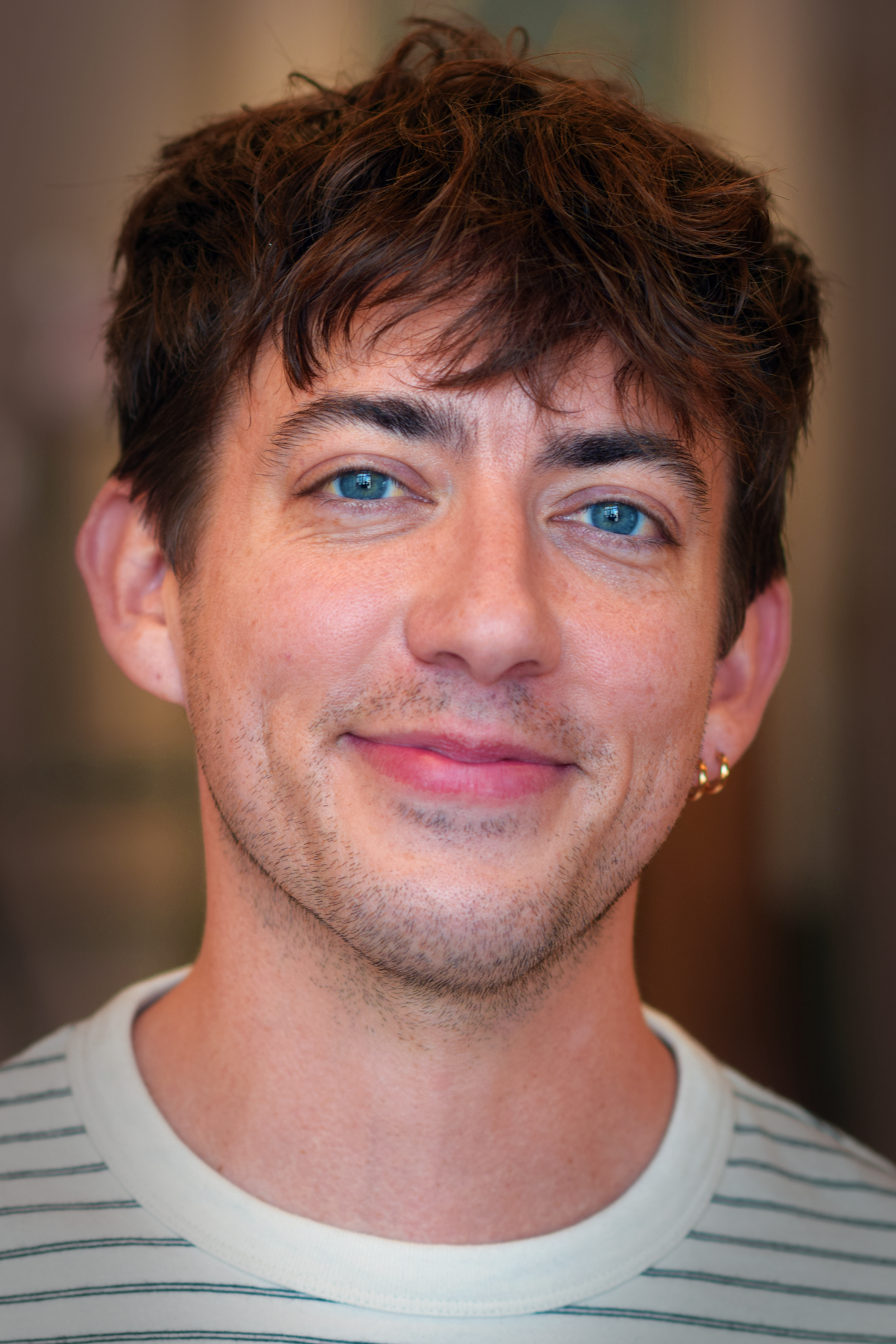
- McHale in 2024
- Born: Kevin Michael McHale; June 14, 1988 (age 38); Plano, Texas, U.S.
- Occupations: Actor; singer; dancer
- Years active: 2005–present
- Partner: Austin P. McKenzie (2016–present)
- Musical career
- Genres: Pop; R&B; urban
- Labels: Capitol / Roc Nation (2014–present); The Ultimate Group (2006–09) (NLT)

Kevin Michael McHale (born June 14, 1988) is an American actor and singer. Formerly one of the two lead vocalists of the boy band NLT, McHale is best known for his role as Artie Abrams in the Fox musical comedy-drama series Glee, for which he was nominated for a Grammy Award, three Screen Actors Guild Award for Outstanding Performance by an Ensemble in a Comedy Series and two Teen Choice Awards.

From 2014 to 2016, he hosted the British panel show Virtually Famous on E4. In 2019, McHale and Glee co-star Jenna Ushkowitz began a podcast called Showmance, where they recap Glee episodes and interview Glee cast and crew members, as well as other people. The podcast was rebranded in 2022 as And That's What You Really Missed on iHeartRadio.

== Early life ==
McHale was born in Plano, Texas, to Christopher McHale and Elizabeth Payne, the youngest of four children. His older sister is a talent agent, and he got his start in acting by convincing her to let him audition for a local commercial. He grew up with actor and singer Demi Lovato. He moved to California with his parents as a teenager in order to pursue a career in the entertainment industry. McHale attended Academy of the Canyons High School in the Santa Clarita Valley in California.

== Career ==
=== Music ===
Before becoming an actor, McHale joined the American four-member boy band NLT ("Not Like Them") as one of two lead singers. They were discovered by Chris Stokes in 2006, who subsequently signed them to his label, The Ultimate Group. On March 13, 2007, they released their first single, "That Girl". The following month, they opened (with Chantelle Paige) for The Pussycat Dolls. The band also made a guest appearance in the film Bratz: The Movie as an auditioning band. While in the group, McHale, along with Timbaland and his bandmates, co-wrote the song "She Said, I Said (Time We Let Go)". On April 30, 2009, member Travis Michael Garland announced that NLT had split.

McHale, who has a record deal with Universal Music Group, writes original music in his spare time. In an interview with Mario Lopez, McHale stated that he plans to pursue solo music post-Glee. In 2015, McHale, Chris Moy, and Justin Thorne co-wrote the song "Heartless" which was featured on the latter's debut EP The Heartbreaker. That same year, he starred in the music video for Thorne's song "Summer Nights". In April 2019, McHale released the pop song "Help Me Now", directed by Justin Thorne. The accompanying music video stars McHale and actor Nolan Gould. McHale described the video as having "a bootleg kinda gay Wes Anderson vibe." In June 2019, he released the song "James Dean". The accompanying music video stars McHale and Pose actor Johnny Sibilly.

In 2019, McHale released his first solo album, Boy.

Also in 2019, he competed in The X Factor: Celebrity, in which he finished in seventh place.

In 2021, McHale (with Chris Moy, Shelby Rabara, Justin Thorne, and Jenna Ushkowitz) began production on a musical children's show called The AlphaBeatZ. McHale voices Ross, one of the five animated teddy bear characters. A five-song Christmas EP was released on December 17, 2021. McHale is credited as co-writer of the three original songs on the EP.

=== Acting ===
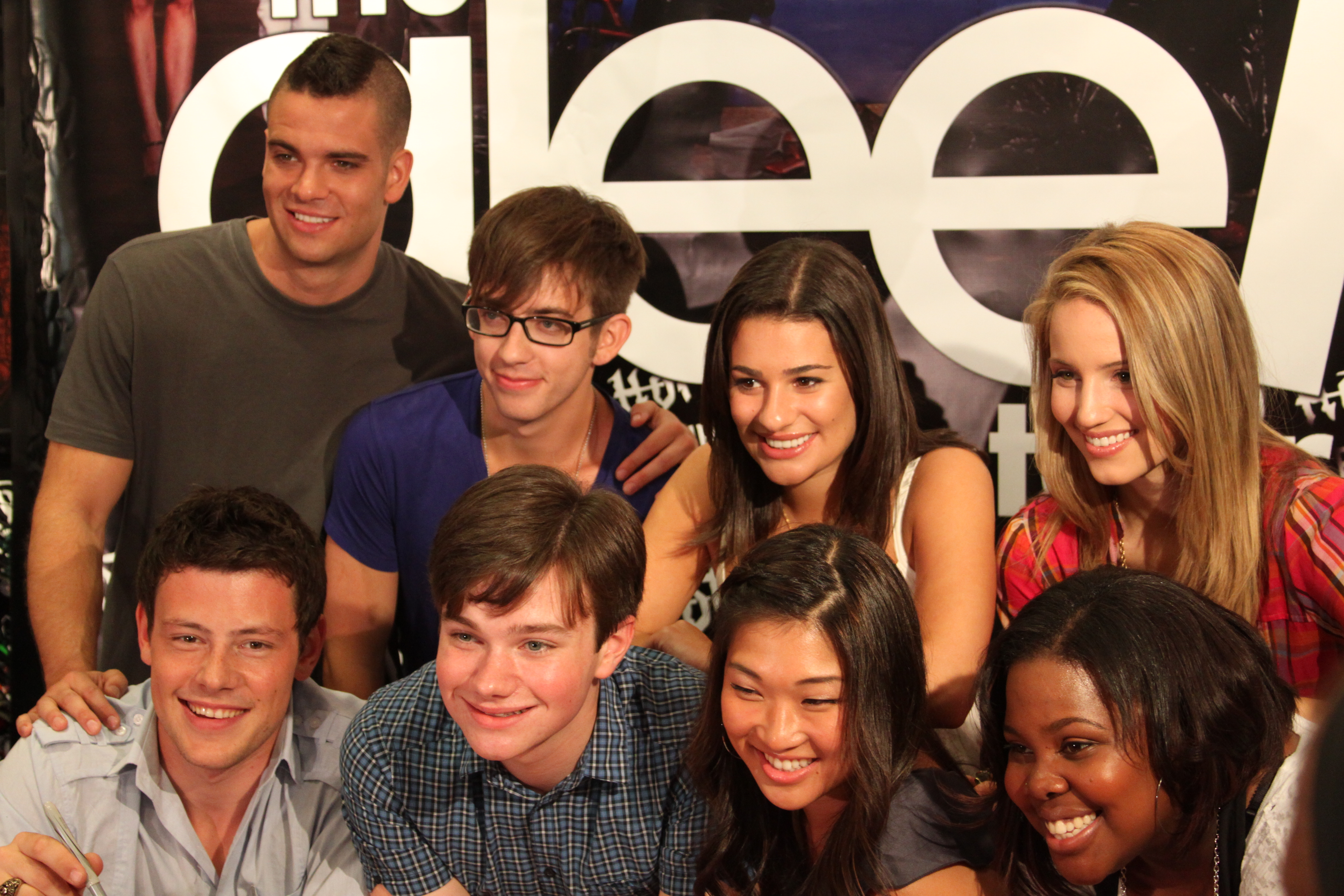
McHale (top row, second from left) with his Glee co-stars in August 2009

In 2007, McHale made a guest appearance on NBC's comedy series The Office in the season four episode "Launch Party", portraying a pizza delivery boy who is taken hostage by Michael Scott (Steve Carell). He guest starred in three episodes of Nickelodeon's teen drama series Zoey 101 as Dooley Fibadoo. In 2008, McHale guest starred in two episodes of HBO's dark fantasy drama series True Blood, appearing as Neil Jones, a coroner's assistant.

In 2009, McHale landed his breakout role as Artie Abrams in the Fox musical comedy-drama series Glee. His character, who uses a wheelchair owing to a car accident, joins the McKinley High glee club in the first episode. He had his first solo performance on the show when he sang "Dancing with Myself" in the episode "Wheels". In the episode "Dream On", he danced in a fantasy sequence to "The Safety Dance", and sang "Dream a Little Dream of Me". In the second-season episode "Britney/Brittany", he sang a solo (in a dream sequence) of "Stronger", after being anaesthetized for dental surgery. He also danced in a dream sequence alongside Harry Shum Jr. to Michael Jackson's song "Scream" in the third-season episode "Michael". McHale, along with the main cast of the series, was nominated for the Screen Actors Guild Award for Outstanding Performance by an Ensemble in a Comedy Series four times, winning in 2010.

In 2010, McHale appeared briefly in One Call's music video "Blacklight" alongside former NLT bandmate Justin Thorne, who was a member of One Call. In June 2011, McHale appeared in Katy Perry's music video for her song "Last Friday Night (T.G.I.F.)" as the character Everett McDonald. On July 22, 2012, McHale co-hosted the 2012 Teen Choice Awards with Demi Lovato. In January 2014, it was reported that McHale would host a comedy panel show, Virtually Famous, for the British digital television channel E4. The show features comedian Seann Walsh and radio presenter Chris Stark as series regulars and team captains.

On February 24, 2014, it was announced that McHale had signed on to play a supporting role in the Kathy Bates and Dustin Hoffman led independent film Boychoir. McHale's character, Wooly, is a young music teacher who helps a troubled young boy at his school. In July 2014, it was announced that he and Aaron Tveit had signed on to star in the comedy film They Might Be Kennedys, but the film was postponed indefinitely in 2015 after the production was failed to be cast in time. McHale was cast to play one of the leads, Teddy Mulligan. In 2015, McHale competed with his mother, father, sister, and uncle on Celebrity Family Feud against Fred Willard. In April 2016, McHale joined the cast of Dustin Lance Black's drama miniseries When We Rise as AIDS activist Bobbi Campbell.

In December 2020, McHale was a part of a mini musical music video called "Stay Inside". He co-starred alongside dancer Haley Fitzgerald. The song and video were written by the composers of the Broadway and West End musical Six, Toby Marlow and Lucy Moss. The video was choreographed by Kyle Hanagami. Viewers were encouraged to make donations to Broadway Cares/Equity Fights AIDS, the philanthropic heart of Broadway.

On June 3, 2021 Ryan Murphy revealed McHale to be one of four actors starring in the upcoming spin-off series American Horror Stories. McHale starred alongside Dyllón Burnside of Pose, Charles Melton of Riverdale, and Nico Greetham of The Prom. Murphy announced the new cast via Instagram post where he dubbed the four men the Fantastic Four. The new series premiered on Hulu July 15, 2021 and concluded on Halloween. McHale played the role of Barry, a member of the fictional social media influencer group "The Bro House", in the fourth episode of the anthology series which was titled "The Naughty List".

In December 2021, McHale was a part of an off-Broadway workshop for Radiant Baby, a musical about artist Keith Haring, where he was cast as Haring. The workshop was postponed due to a surge in COVID-19 cases. The production was originally set to run at Two River Theater in Red Bank, New Jersey from June 4–26, 2022, but was ultimately canceled.

=== Radio and podcast ===
Beginning in 2014, McHale and Glee co-star Amber Riley hosted a radio show on Dash Radio called McRiley. The show aired on Fridays at 3 PM PST/6 PM EST, but went on indefinite hiatus in 2015 due to their busy filming schedules for Glee. McHale went on to become one of the four hosts of Sick of My Own Voice on Dash Radio in 2015. The other hosts included his NLT bandmate and longtime roommate Justin Thorne, songwriter and photographer Brittany Burton, and YouTuber Amy Lynn Thompson. The four have been friends since high school. The show aired on Thursdays at 1 PM PST/4 PM EST.

In 2019 Kevin McHale and former Glee co-star Jenna Ushkowitz launched the podcast Showmance to discuss their on-screen and offline relationship. One of the most requested discussion topics of Season 1 of the podcast was their time on Glee. In season 2 they started an in-depth recap of Glee Season 1. Each episode featured McHale and Ushkowitz re-watching episodes of Glee and sharing behind-the-scenes secrets while also sharing personal sentiments and reflections about filming. The podcast was part of the LadyGang network on PodcastOne. The podcast started an indefinite hiatus in July 2020 following the death of Naya Rivera.

In September 2022, McHale and Ushkowitz announced their new podcast endeavor And That's What You Really Missed on iHeartRadio. Their rebranded and reimagined Glee recap podcast will start at the beginning, recapping and sharing memories from all six seasons of the show.

== Personal life ==
In September 2012, McHale and his dog Sophie appeared in a PETA ad campaign, promoting the adoption of shelter animals. In June 2016, the Human Rights Campaign released a video in tribute to the victims of the 2016 Orlando gay nightclub shooting, in which McHale and other celebrities told the stories of the people killed there. In September 2016, he co-created the mobile app +ONE, created with the intent to "provide people with one app to simplify the process of creating events."

McHale resides in the Hollywood Hills. He is a Los Angeles Dodgers fan.

In April 2018, McHale came out as gay with a tweet. He has been in a relationship with actor Austin P. McKenzie since 2016. McHale and McKenzie met on the set of When We Rise.

McHale is a member of the Democratic Party. He publicly supported the presidential campaigns of Barack Obama in 2012, Hillary Clinton in 2016, and Joe Biden in 2020.

== Filmography ==
=== Film ===
Year	Title	Role	Notes
2007	Ruthless	Neighbor Neil	Short film
2007	Bratz	Boy Band Member	With NLT
2010	One Call: Blacklight		Short film
2011	Glee: The 3D Concert Movie	Artie Abrams	Concert film
2014	Boychoir	Wooly	
TBA	They Might Be Kennedys	Teddy Mulligan	Production postponed indefinitely

=== Television ===
Year	Title	Role	Notes
2005	All That	Mark	Season 10, Episode 13: "On-Air Dares"
2007	The Office	Delivery Kid	Season 4, Episode 6: "Launch Party Part 2"
2007–2008	Zoey 101	Dooley Thibodeaux	3 episodes
2008	True Blood	Neil Jones	2 episodes
2009–2015	Glee	Artie Abrams	113 episodes
2010	2010 Teen Choice Awards	Himself	Co-host
2012	2012 Teen Choice Awards	Himself	Host
2013	Whose Line is it Anyway?	Himself	Season 9, Episode 2
2013	MasterChef	Himself	Season 4, Episode 10 "Top 14 Compete" (Listed as Kevin Michael McHale)
2014–2016	Virtually Famous	Himself	Host
2015	The Numberlys	Task Master (voice)	Television short
2015	Celebrity Family Feud	Himself	Season 2, Episode 3 "Dr. Phil McGraw vs. Garry & Penny Marshall and Kevin McHale vs. Fred Willard"
2016	HeILa	Kevin	Season 2, Episode 2 "House Sitting in LA"
2016–2017	We Bare Bears	Barry (voice)	2 episodes
2017	When We Rise	Robert Boyle "Bobbi" Campbell Jr.	Miniseries
2017	I Want My Phone Back	Contestant #2	Season 2, Episode 10: "Solo Artist"
2018	Nailed It	Himself	Season 1, Episode 1: "First Date to Life Mate"
2019	The X Factor: Celebrity	Himself	Contestant
2020	Elite	Bill McKinley	Season 3, Episode 7: "Nadia and Omar"
2020	Royalties	Switchback Jacket Gutiarist	Episode: "I Am So Much Better Than You at Everything" Television short
2020	MTV Cribs UK	Himself	Season 2, Episode 2
2021	American Horror Stories	Barry	Season 1, Episode 4: "The Naughty List"
2021	Whose Line is it Anyway?	Himself	Season 18, Episode 1
2021	The AlphaBeatz	Ross (voice)	Children's series
2022	RuPaul's Secret Celebrity Drag Race	Chic-Li-Fay	Contestant (4th Place); 7 episodes
2026	The Hunting Party	Dylan Miles	Season 2, Episode 11

=== Theater ===
Year	Title	Role	Venue	Notes
2024	The 25th Annual Putnam County Spelling Bee	William Barfee	Washington, D.C, Kennedy Center	Regional
2025	The Frogs	Xanthias	Southwark Playhouse	London debut
2025	The 25th Annual Putnam County Spelling Bee	William Barfee	New World Stages	Off-Broadway
2026	The Rocky Horror Show	Brad	Studio 54	Broadway debut

=== Music videos ===
Year	Title	Artist	Notes
2007	"That Girl"	NLT	Himself
2009	"She Said, I Said (Time We Let Go)"	NLT	Himself
2009	"Karma"	NLT	Himself
2010	"Blacklight"	One Call	
2011	"Last Friday Night (T.G.I.F.)"	Katy Perry	Everett McDonald
2014	"Somebody Loves You"	Betty Who	
2015	"Summer Nights"	Himself; Justin Thorne	Himself
2019	"Help Me Now"	Himself	Directed by Justin Thorne
2019	"James Dean"	Himself	Directed by Justin Thorne; Special appearance by Johnny Sibilly
2019	"Arizona"	Himself	Directed by Justin Thorne
2019	"Younger"	Himself	Directed by Hudson Rennan
2020	"Stay Inside: The Mini Musical"	Himself; Haley Fitzgerald	Written by Toby Marlow and Lucy Moss

=== Video games ===
Year	Title	Role	Notes
2018	The Inpatient	David Miller (voice)	Also motion capture

== Awards and nominations ==
Year	Award	Work	Result
2010	Teen Choice Award for Choice TV: Breakout Star Male	Glee	Nominated
2010	Teen Choice Award for Choice Music: Group	Glee	Nominated
2010	Gold Derby Award for Ensemble of the Year	Glee	Nominated
2010	Screen Actors Guild Award for Outstanding Performance by an Ensemble in a Comedy Series	Glee	Won
2011	Screen Actors Guild Award for Outstanding Performance by an Ensemble in a Comedy Series	Glee	Nominated
2011	Grammy Award for Best Pop Performance by a Duo or Group with Vocals	"Don't Stop Believin' (Regionals version)" (Note: Shared with Cory Monteith, Lea Michele, Chris Colfer, Amber Riley, Jenna Ushkowitz, Mark Salling and Naya Rivera)	Nominated
2012	Screen Actors Guild Award for Outstanding Performance by an Ensemble in a Comedy Series	Glee	Nominated
2013	Screen Actors Guild Award for Outstanding Performance by an Ensemble in a Comedy Series	Glee	Nominated

== Discography ==
EP

- Boy (2019)
- The AlphaBeatZ Christmas (2021)
