= How to Be a Man =

- Film poster
- Directed by: Chadd Harbold
- Written by: Bryan Gaynor; Chadd Harbold; Gavin McInnes
- Produced by: Terry Leonard
- Starring: Gavin McInnes
- Cinematography: Ryan Samul
- Edited by: Bryan Gaynor
- Music by: Michael James Onufrak
- Production company: Zero Day Fox
- Distributed by: Zero Day Fox
- Release dates: August 10, 2013 (Sundance Next Weekend); March 15, 2014 (Internet)
- Running time: 85 minutes
- Country: United States
- Language: English

How to Be a Man is a 2013 American comedy film directed by Chadd Harbold and starring Gavin McInnes. It tells the story of an ex-comedian who mistakenly believes that he is dying from breast cancer, and therefore makes a video with advice for his unborn son. The film was produced through Zero Day Fox.

== Cast ==
- Gavin McInnes as Mark McCarthy
- Liam Aiken as Bryan
- Megan Neuringer as Margot
- Nicole Balsam as Gabby
- Marisa Redanty as Bryan's mom
- Helen Rogers as Kaitlin
- Jasmine Osborne as Annabelle

== Release ==
The film premiered on August 10, 2013 at the Sundance Next Weekend in Los Angeles. It was released on the Internet on March 15, 2014.

== Reception ==
The Hollywood Reporter's Justin Lowe wrote: "Serving as a reminder that gross-out male-centric comedies aren't just the domain of better-pedigreed productions, How To Be A Man strips the genre down to its bare essentials, which primarily has the effect of emphasizing the careful tonal calibration required to effectively pull off a such a relentless raunch-fest. ... With his extensive media background, Vice Magazine co-founder, comedian and ad-man McInnes would seem to be a savvy commentator on contemporary male foibles, but Man's litany of life lessons turns out to have variable appeal when reduced to their lowest common denominators of sex, partying and bodily functions."
