= NationStates =

Government simulation video game

- Screenshot of the home page in 2020
- Website type: Government simulation game, internet forum
- Available in: English
- Key people: Max Barry (owner and creator)
- Revenue: Advertising; Paid premium memberships; Encouraged book sales
- Website: www.nationstates.net
- Commercial: Yes
- Registration: Optional
- Users: 502,173 active nations (as of 21 November 2026)
- Launched: 13 November 2002; 24 years ago
- Current status: Active
- Written in: Perl

NationStates (formerly Jennifer Government: NationStates) is a free, multiplayer government simulation browser game and internet forum created by Australian novelist Max Barry. Released on 13 November 2002, the game was originally developed to promote Barry's dystopian novel Jennifer Government, on which the game is loosely based on.

== History ==
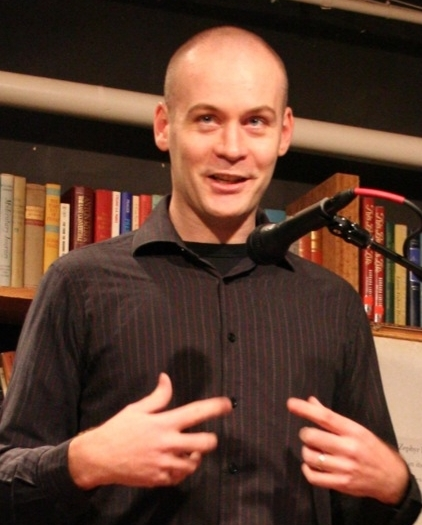
Max Barry in 2006

NationStates, then named Jennifer Government: NationStates, was launched on 13 November 2002 by Australian novelist Max Barry to help promote the sale of his novel Jennifer Government, on which the game is loosely based on, prior to its release. Development began in August. Barry has stated that he was influenced to create the website after he took a multiple-choice political quiz to determine a person's political affiliations; he added that "it was fun, but I also wanted to see what kind of country my policies created, and have to deal with the consequences".

On 21 January 2008, Barry received a cease-and-desist letter from the United Nations (UN) for unauthorised usage of its name and emblem for the game's fictionalised United Nations. As a result, Barry changed the name of the organisation to the "World Assembly", introducing the change as a permanent April Fool's prank. Barry joked about the situation: "[Players have] implemented privacy safeguards, promoted religious tolerance, passed a universal bill of rights, and outlawed child labour, amongst 240 other resolutions [...] Clearly this wasn't anything the real UN wanted to be associated with." Barry complied willingly, citing his support of the UN and his total lack of legal standing.

On 27 January 2026, NationStates was temporarily taken offline following a suspected data breach carried out by a player with a history of legitimate bug reporting. Barry posted updates on the website during the outage, revealing that a feature introduced to the game on 2 September 2025 called "Dispatch Search" contained a double-parsing-bug—the first of its kind reported on the site. However, the player performed an unauthorised remote-code-execution in the game's servers while testing the bug and copied the game data to their personal system. Although the aforementioned player claimed to have deleted the copied data since, the site administrators stated that they couldn't confirm it and as such determined that the servers have been compromised.

== Gameplay ==
A chart showing the game's 27 government types

Players register by setting up their nation through answering a short questionnaire which determines the type of government the nation will have. Players can determine their nation's pretitle, name, flag, motto, currency, animal, capital, leader, and faith. Additionally, players may publish dispatches known as "factbooks," which can convey textual and visual information about their nation and be used for worldbuilding and/or roleplaying.

The gameplay is centered on the player deciding government policies through "issues." Issues are written by either Barry or the players themselves with moderator editing and are based on real-world politics with an "absurd and humorous direction". The player may choose from a list of options or dismiss the issue, and the player's responses may affect the nation's status across three main statistics: political freedom, civil rights, and economic freedom; based on these main statuses, the nation is assigned to one of twenty-seven government classifications which are determined on a three-axis scale of personal, economic, and political freedom. When NationStates initially launched, players received only one issue per day; however, multiple issues are now received per day on timed intervals.

Players can also choose to join the World Assembly, a United Nations-like body concerned with the drafting and passage of international law. Membership in the World Assembly is voluntary. Users can create their own regions that other nations can populate. NationStates does not have a win condition nor winners and losers. The game also does not have any warring or trading mechanics, although players can roleplay such interactions.

NationStates has an active forum board. The board was hosted from 2004 to 2009 by Jolt Online Gaming, before becoming self-hosted when Jolt was acquired by OMAC Holdings. There are a variety of categories in which many topics can be found. As of January 2024, approximately 33.14 million posts have been made within approximately 443,000 forum threads, with just over 1.8 million users being registered.

== Reception ==
=== Critical reception ===
In the 2009 book The Video Game Theory Reader 2, Lars Konzack critiqued that NationStates promoted libertarianism, but also stated that it is "open to experimentation and reflection on politics rather than being merely political propaganda. It becomes a philosophical game in which the player is invited to become part of an examination of political ideas. This game takes advantage of the potential in games to truly put the player in control and let them reflect on their own decisions, investigating political theory turned into meaningful game aesthetics." In the 2008 book The Art and Science of Interface and Interaction Design, C. Paul said that NationStates is "an interesting take on the interplay of freedom and control (and governance without government)". In a 2004 article, the BBC described NationStates as a "tongue-in-cheek nation simulation game".

Jay Is Games' Jerrad praised the game, stating "the real beauty in this game is that it's accessible on so many levels". ProgrammableWeb's Kevin Sundstrom listed NationStates among its "30 New APIs", remarking that its application programming interface (API) "provides a developer interface for automate [sic] game world data collection". Super Jump Magazine's Andrew Johnston described NationStates as "a product of an era in which people still created websites solely as a means of self-expression".

=== Popularity ===
The game attracted a thousand players within two weeks, and had 20,700 by the end of the first year. Barry was surprised by the popularity of the game, and saw its discussion forums developing into an arena for political debate. He was impressed by some of the activity in the forums, relating how "one nation accused another of conducting secret missile tests and posted photos to prove it. That escalated into an international crisis that was only solved by sending in teams of independent weapons inspectors". In 2007, Barry stated that when he launched the game, he initially believed that "nobody would be interested in playing a political simulation game. I imagined NationStates as the kind of game you might stumble across, have fun with for a week or two, then move on. Then this entire community just popped into existence, as vibrant and dedicated as any on the internet".

Alexa Internet ranked NationStates as the 14,380th most visited website in 2016.

== See also ==
- List of Internet forums
- Online games
- The Political Compass
