= Jennifer Government =

2003 novel by Max Barry

- The cover for English versions of the novel
- Author: Max Barry
- Cover artist: Maria Carella
- Language: English
- Genre: Satire, speculative fiction
- Publisher: Doubleday
- Publication date: 21 January 2003
- Publication place: Australia
- Media type: Print (hardcover & paperback) and e-book
- Pages: 336
- ISBN: 0-385-50759-3 (hardcover)
- OCLC: 49285531
- Dewey Decimal: 813/.54 21
- LC Class: PS3552.A7424 J46 2003
- Preceded by: Syrup
- Followed by: Company

Jennifer Government is a 2003 dystopian novel by Max Barry, set in an alternate reality where most nations in the Americas and Oceania are dominated by powerful corporations and corporate libertarianism coalitions, and where government power is extremely limited. It was a finalist for a Campbell Award, and was included in The New York Times' annual list of notable books. The novel was retitled from Jennifer Government to Logoland in its German and Italian editions. In its Brazilian edition it was retitled to EU S/A, an abbreviation of Estados Unidos Sociedade Anônima, which roughly translates to United States, Inc.

To help promote the novel, Barry created a browser game titled Jennifer Government: NationStates (later shortened to NationStates). In the game, players make choices which are inspired by the novel and which affect the economy, society, and culture of their countries. NationStates launched alongside the book and remains active as of 2026.

== Plot ==
In the alternate present the novel portrays, the United States has taken over entirety of the Americas (except for Cuba) and dominates much of the rest of the world. The United States adopts "capitalizm", a form of minarchy that abolishes taxation and privatizes government.

People take the names of the corporations that employ them as their surnames, and persons with two jobs hyphenate their name, e.g. "Julia Nike-McDonald's". Employees of the government, including the novel's title character, take the surname Government.

John Nike, Vice President of Guerrilla Marketing, contracts Hack Nike, a clumsy and naïve low-level-employee, to execute an ambitious and unethical secret marketing scheme. John plans to increase interest in the upcoming Nike Mercury shoes by having Hack kill people who try to buy them, intending to make the shoes appear so desirable that customers are killing each other to acquire them. Hack signs the contract without reading it. When he finds out that it requires him to commit murder, he subcontracts the scheme to the Police, now a mercenary organisation, in an attempt to keep his job (which requires fulfilling the contract) without having to take responsibility for murder.

After several children are murdered at various Nike stores on opening day, Jennifer Government takes it upon herself to track down the perpetrators, even if she cannot get the funding for her investigation. One of the murdered children bought the shoes with money given to her by Buy Mitsui, a French stockbroker flush with money after recent professional success. Feeling personally responsible for the girl's death, Buy joins forces with Jennifer.

At the same time, Violet (Hack's girlfriend) creates a dangerous computer virus, intending to sell it to the highest bidder. She succeeds in selling it to ExxonMobil. Her handlers take her all over the world to exploit the virus's power, but never pay her for it. Angered, Violet turns to John Nike, who promises to help her revenge herself on ExxonMobil. In exchange, John demands that Violet kidnap Kate, Jennifer Government's daughter, intending to use her as leverage to deter Jennifer's investigation.

Hack Nike is fired and founds an anti-corporate activist group in order to take revenge on John Nike. Hack and Jennifer Government succeed in rescuing Kate and arresting John.

== Attempted film adaptation ==
Barry optioned film rights for Jennifer Government to Section 8, a production company owned by Steven Soderbergh and George Clooney early in the book's life. In 2005, Louis Mellis and Dave Scinto, writers of Sexy Beast, were chosen by Soderbergh and Clooney to write the screenplay. However, with the closure of Section 8 in 2006, the film rights returned to Barry.
