= Coca-Cola with Coffee =

Coffee-flavored cola soft drink

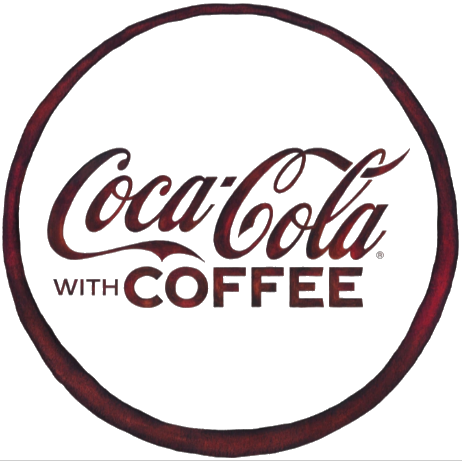
- Type: Coffee-flavored cola
- Manufacturer: The Coca-Cola Company
- Introduced: September 2017 (Japan); January 2021 (United States)
- Discontinued: 2022 (United States)
- Variants: Coca-Cola with Coffee Zero Sugar
- Related products: Coca-Cola BlāK
- Website: coca-cola.com/coke-with-coffee

Coca-Cola with Coffee (also called Coca-Cola Coffee Plus) is a coffee-flavored version of Coca-Cola and an international drink. It was first launched in 2017 in Japan and was distributed to international markets in the following years, being introduced to the United States in 2021.

== History ==
The coffee variant of Coca-Cola was first distributed in Japan under the name Coca-Cola Coffee Plus in September 2017, as a product only available in vending machines. A sugar-free version, Coca-Cola Plus Coffee No Sugar, was announced later in the month and launched in October 2017 as a limited edition in Australia.

A previous coffee-flavored version, Coca-Cola BlāK, was launched in 2006 and discontinued in 2008. The major difference between these two is that Coca-Cola with Coffee contains more real coffee than Blak; in particular, according to Coca-Cola executive Jaideep Kipe, it combines classic Coca-Cola with authentic Brazilian coffee powder. The formula for Coca-Cola with Coffee differs for each region to suit local tastes.

== International expansion ==
By 2020, just two years after its launch in Japan, Coca-Cola with Coffee became available in over 30 markets around the world, including Australia, Italy, Spain, Thailand, Poland, Brazil, Vietnam and Turkey. Internationally, the drink is currently sold under the name Coca-Cola + Coffee. In 2019, the drink was introduced in Serbia, being sold exclusively at iDEA stores.

=== North American launch ===
Following its testing which led to international success, the Coca-Cola Company introduced the Coca-Cola with Coffee and Coca‑Cola with Coffee Zero Sugar lines to the United States on January 25, 2021. It arrived in three new flavors, which included Dark Blend, Vanilla and Caramel. The zero-sugar counterpart was made available in two flavors, Dark Blend and Vanilla. Accompanying the launch, brand director of Coca‑Cola in North America Brandan Strickland said:

We’re focusing our innovation efforts on doing what Coca‑Cola has always stood for and does best – which is to deliver emotional and functional uplift – in bigger, bolder, more differentiated ways. Coca‑Cola with Coffee is a true hybrid innovation that provides the perfect solution for that mid-afternoon pick-me-up we all want, especially in today's work-from-home environment. We're fulfilling this need state and occasion in a uniquely Coca‑Cola way. This is a beverage that's truly meant to be tasted.

The launch was short-lived, and in November 2022, Coca‑Cola with Coffee was discontinued in the United States after a brief run, with Coca-Cola prioritizing its focus on Coca-Cola Zero Sugar, Coca-Cola Creations and Coca-Cola mini-cans. Despite the discontinuation, the beverage is still, although rarely, sold in various countries.
