= Providence (Barry novel) =

Science fiction novel by Max Barry

- First edition
- Author: Max Barry
- Subject: Interstellar War
- Genre: Science Fiction
- Set in: Computer controlled starship
- Publisher: Putnam (US); Hodder & Stoughton (UK)
- Publication date: 31 March 2020
- ISBN: 978-0-593-08517-2
- Preceded by: Lexicon

Providence is the sixth novel by Australian science fiction author Max Barry. It was published in March 2020 by Putnam.

== Plot ==
Humans have been exploring other star systems for some time, prior to encountering another race of intelligent space travelers. The aliens are hostile, and war broke out seven years prior to the departure of the warship Providence, and its crew of four, composed of Gilly, Talia, Anders, and Jackson. The crew were partially chosen for the attractive image they will project in the social media messages they transmit back to the home front, while a computer actually runs the ship. Two years into the mission, after the ship has already destroyed one alien colony, mental instability begins to affect the crew.

== Reception ==
When it compared Providence with other recently published science fiction novels, the Financial Times wrote "Providence is smart and fun but it's no classic."

A review by The Associated Press compared the novel to Starship Troopers by Robert Heinlein and The Sparrow by Mary Doria Russell - although updated "for the internet age."

A review in Locus compared the novel to Galaxies by Barry N. Malzberg, The Black Corridor by Michael Moorcock, the television show Red Dwarf, and Alien.
