= Revenge for Jolly! =

- Promotional poster
- Directed by: Chadd Harbold
- Written by: Brian Petsos
- Produced by: William Green; Aaron L. Ginsburg; Brian Petsos
- Starring: Brian Petsos; Oscar Isaac; Elijah Wood; Adam Brody; Gillian Jacobs; Bobby Moynihan; Ryan Phillippe; Kristen Wiig
- Cinematography: Daniel Katz
- Edited by: Micah Scarpelli; Vito DeSario
- Music by: David Fleming; Whitey
- Production companies: Atlas Independent; A Saboteur
- Distributed by: Sony Pictures Home Entertainment
- Release dates: April 21, 2012 (Tribeca); May 7, 2013 (United States)
- Running time: 85 minutes
- Country: United States
- Language: English

Revenge for Jolly! is a 2012 American comedy-drama film directed by Chadd Harbold and written by Brian Petsos. It stars Petsos as a man who avenges the death of his beloved dog. Oscar Isaac, Elijah Wood, Adam Brody, Gillian Jacobs, Bobby Moynihan, Ryan Phillippe, and Kristen Wiig co-star. The film premiered at the Tribeca Film Festival on April 21, 2012, and was released in the United States on DVD on May 7, 2013, by Sony Pictures Home Entertainment.

== Plot ==
The film reverts 36 hours earlier after a man pulls up at a house and confronts another man at his front door. The tale centers on Harry, a freelancer who spends a great deal of time with his beloved female pup, Jolly. Owing a group of people a large amount of money for refusing to do them a favor, he plans to leave town to avoid the debt. One day when he returns home, Jolly is found dead. Stricken with grief and anger, Harry enlists the help of his close cousin Cecil to find Jolly's murderer, dragging him through a path of destruction.

At a bar, they interrogate a rude bartender, Thomas, getting a lead on a man named Bachmeier, a regular visitor and suspect who was given Harry's address upon request. Harry snaps and shoots Thomas dead for that reason. Next, they track down known prostitute, Tina, who was recently seen with Bachmeier. Refusing to pay her for sex and written info, Cecil is shot by Tina in the hand with a gun, but Tina joins her friend Vicki in death when Harry shoots them, as he grows overly vengeful.

The following stop takes Harry and Cecil to a law firm office, where they confront and wipe out three unscrupulous lawyers, Bobby, Eichelberger and Danny, for withholding info. The receptionist eventually tells them Bachmeier is at a wedding reception. There, Harry and Cecil show up uninvited and hold the people hostage, although Bachmeier is not present and his sister, Angela, informs them that her family is dysfunctional. After killing many people in attendance, assaulting Angela and shooting her husband, Gary, a man soon gives them Bachmeier's address.

The film returns to the beginning. Harry pulls up at a house, leaving Cecil in his car to approach an armed Bachmeier at his front door. Harry blames him for Jolly's death, and Bachmeier invites him in like nothing is wrong. The final image shows two shots fired inside the house, though it is only seen from a distance on the outside.

== Cast ==
- Brian Petsos as Harry Dennis
- Oscar Isaac as Cecil
- Elijah Wood as Thomas
- Ryan Phillippe as Everett Bachmeier
- Kristen Wiig as Angela
- Adam Brody as Danny Fidazzo
- Gillian Jacobs as Tina
- Bobby Moynihan as Bobby Fidazzo
- Kevin Corrigan as Tony
- David Rasche as Eichelberger
- Garret Dillahunt as Gary
- Amy Seimetz as Vicki
- Jayne Atkinson as Receptionist
- Brad Morris as Dale
- Steve Payne as Gene
