= The Birthday Cake =

- Film poster
- Directed by: Jimmy Giannopoulos
- Screenplay by: Jimmy Giannopoulos; Diomedes Raul Bermudez; Shiloh Fernandez
- Produced by: Diomedes Raul Bermudez; Danny Sawaf; Siena Oberman; Shiloh Fernandez; Carlos Cuscó
- Starring: Shiloh Fernandez; Val Kilmer; Ewan McGregor; Ashley Benson; Lorraine Bracco; David Mazouz
- Cinematography: Sean Price Williams
- Music by: Jimmy Giannopoulos; Tim Sandusky
- Production companies: Purpose Films; Artemis; SSS Entertainment; SSS Film Capital; Oceana Studios
- Distributed by: Screen Media Films
- Release date: June 18, 2021
- Running time: 93 minutes
- Country: United States
- Language: English
- Box office: $23,649

The Birthday Cake is a 2021 American crime thriller film directed by Jimmy Giannopoulos, from a screenplay by Diomedes Raul Bermudez, Shiloh Fernandez and Giannopoulos. It is the feature directorial debut for Giannopoulos, who previously directed short films and worked with Miley Cyrus, A$AP Rocky, Kid Cudi, and others on music projects. This is the last movie Paul Sorvino starred in at the time of his death on July 25, 2022.

The Birthday Cake was released in the United States on June 18, 2021.

== Premise ==
Young Italian-American, Giovanni "Gio", reluctantly continues his family's annual tradition of bringing a cake to the house of his Uncle Angelo, a local crime lord, to mark the anniversary of his mob-connected father's passing ten years earlier. It is not long before he witnesses a murder along the way, that will force him to learn the truth behind his father's death and change his life forever.

== Cast ==
- Ewan McGregor as Father Kelly
- Shiloh Fernandez as Giovanni "Gio"
  - David Mazouz as young Gio
- Val Kilmer as Uncle Angelo
- Lorraine Bracco as Sofia
- Ashley Benson as Tracey
- John Magaro as Cousin Joey
- Vincent Pastore as Vito
- Nick Vallelonga as Uncle Tiny Tony
- Marla Maples as Aunt Emma
- Emily Tremaine as Karen
- William Fichtner as Uncle Ricardo
- Jeremy Allen White as Tommaso
- Emory Cohen as Leo
- Franky G as Omar
- Ruben Rivera as Ramon
- Jose Jimenez as Julio
- Tyler Dean Flores as Flacko
- Penn Badgley as Peeno
- Luis Guzman as Jochee
- Aldis Hodge as Eagle
- Jake Weary as Agent Pete
- Clara McGregor as Diane
- Paul Sorvino as Uncle Carmine
- Joseph D'Onofrio as Bootsy

== Production ==
In August 2019, it was announced that Ewan McGregor, Shiloh Fernandez and Val Kilmer joined the cast of the film. Producers include Diomedes Raul Bermudez of Purpose Films, Siena Oberman of Artemis Pictures and Danny Sawaf of Oceana Studios. Jamin O'Brien, Jason Weinberg and Greg Lauritano are executive producers. Cassius Corrigan is a Co-Producer.

== Reception ==
On Rotten Tomatoes, the film has an approval rating of 22%, based on reviews from 23 critics.

Richard Roeper of the Chicago Sun-Times commended Giannopoulos' directorial efforts, the star-studded ensemble and some "truly tense and harrowing moments" throughout the film, but felt it was nothing more than "a lower-budget descendant to films" like Goodfellas and A Bronx Tale. Leslie Felperin of The Guardian was critical of the film's "meandering script and absurdly grand guignol ending," but gave praise to Sean Price Williams' cinematography for capturing New York City. Conversely, Jeannette Catsoulis of The New York Times praised Giannopoulos and his screenwriters for crafting a "story of operatic vengeance" with "multiple threads of unease" and "throttling tension", concluding that: "Giannopoulos might be inexperienced, but he's canny with mood and unafraid to experiment with the rhythms of violence. I, for one, am keen to see what he does next." Alex Saveliev of Film Threat praised Fernandez for being "a compelling lead" and the rest of his ensemble cast, singling out Fichtner for displaying "unbridled ferocity" as Uncle Ricardo, and the overall quality giving off "a strong Safdie brothers vibe," concluding that: "As it stands, The Birthday Cake is a formidable showcase for an emerging director. It looks like Giannopoulos has several projects on his slate. Behold the birthday of a new cinematic talent."
