= Ratter (film) =

- DVD cover
- Directed by: Branden Kramer
- Written by: Branden Kramer
- Produced by: David Bausch; Ben Browning; Jamie H. Zelermyer
- Starring: Ashley Benson; Matt McGorry
- Cinematography: Stefan Haverkamp
- Edited by: Shelby Siegel
- Music by: Robert Gold
- Production company: Start Motion Pictures
- Distributed by: Destination Films; Vertical Entertainment
- Release dates: January 24, 2015 (Slamdance); February 12, 2016 (United States)
- Running time: 80 minutes
- Country: United States
- Language: English

Ratter is a 2015 American found-footage horror thriller film written and directed by Branden Kramer in his feature debut. The film is based on a short film also written and co-directed by Kramer titled Webcam. It stars Ashley Benson and Matt McGorry.

The film had its world premiere at the 2015 Slamdance Film Festival on January 24, 2015. The film was released on February 12, 2016, in a limited release by Destination Films and Vertical Entertainment.

== Plot ==
Emma Taylor, a graduate student, moves to New York City for a fresh start after her recent break-up with her boyfriend Alex. After settling into her new Brooklyn apartment, someone begins anonymously hacking all her electronic devices and watching her through the cameras. One day, while attending college, Emma meets Michael, who asks her out. The two begin dating. However, after Emma pleasures herself one night, she becomes suspicious as the hacker begins stealing private photos of her with Michael and sending her messages and videos pretending to be Michael. She confronts Michael, who denies sending the messages, but Emma does not believe him and starts avoiding him.

To relieve some stress, Emma and her best friend, Nicole, go clubbing. While they are out, the hacker breaks into her apartment. She returns home drunk and passes out on her couch, unaware that her hacker is out on her balcony. When she wakes up, he is gone, but she does not pay attention as she goes into the bathroom to relieve herself. Michael comes over later that day to check on her and to give her a cat so she does not feel lonely. The two then reconcile and have sex. Sometime later, Michael calls her and tells her someone emailed him telling him to leave Emma alone. Emma panics and calls the police who do nothing. She begins feeling isolated and depressed because nothing can be done about the situation.

One day, Emma comes home to find her apartment door unlocked. She walks into her home and finds her cat dead. She tries to call Michael and tell him the news. However, he never answers or calls back. Feeling more vulnerable than ever, Emma spends the day wandering the city so she does not have to be home alone. She makes plans with Nicole to hang out at Emma's apartment later so she returns home.

While waiting for Nicole, Emma and her mother video chat. In the middle of the chat, Emma's power cuts off and she begins screaming. The hacker appears and begins attacking Emma while the chat with her mother is still going. Emma's screams abruptly stop and her mother calls the police. The hacker then turns the laptop towards him and Emma's mother begins pleading with him to leave her alone. He shuts the laptop. The police show up and begin searching for Emma's whereabouts.

== Cast ==
- Ashley Benson as Emma
- Matt McGorry as Michael
- Rebecca Naomi Jones as Nicole
- Kalli Vernoff as Mom
- Ted Koch as Dad
- Michael William Freeman as Alex
- Alex Cranmer as Professor
- John Anderson as Kent
- Karl Glusman as Brent
- Jason Kolotouros as Officer Cicero

== Release ==
The film had its world premiere at the 2015 Slamdance Film Festival on January 24, 2015, In October 2015, Sony Pictures Worldwide Acquisitions had acquired all global distribution rights to the film. The film was released on February 12, 2016, in a limited release.

=== Home media ===
The film was released on March 1, 2016, through video on demand and home media formats. The film was released direct-to-video in Germany on March 17, 2016, and in Spain on May 11, 2016.

== Reception ==
Ratter has grossed $110,834 with sales of its DVD/Blu-ray releases.
