= Travis Garland =

American singer and dancer (born 1989)

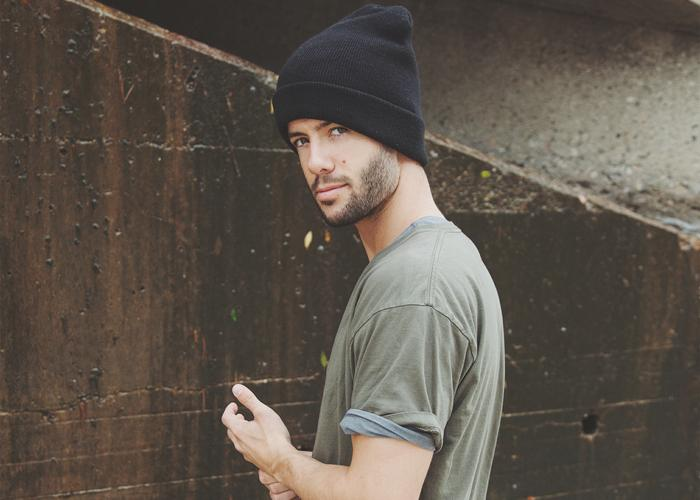
- Occupations: Singer, dancer, actor
- Musical career
- Origin: Lubbock, Texas
- Instruments: Vocals, piano
- Years active: 2003–present
- Formerly of: NLT
- Website: www.travisgarland.com

Travis Garland is an American singer and dancer. He is best known as the former lead singer of the boy band NLT, which consisted of Kevin McHale, Justin Joseph "JJ" Thorne and V Sevani. They were discovered by producer Chris Stokes and signed to his TUG Entertainment label in 2006. In May 2009, Garland confirmed on his Myspace page that the group had split. Garland is now a solo artist.

== Early life and career ==
Growing up in Lubbock, Texas, Travis Garland was exposed to the arts at a very young age. He started off singing and acting in plays at his church and went on to attend the School for the Performing Arts in junior high where he received extensive training in music and theater. After winning a nationwide acting competition at the age of 14, Garland relocated to Los Angeles, California where he signed with a manager and agent. He began going on auditions during the day but spent his nights developing his song-writing, and after a chance meeting with a friend from Dallas he was asked to join the pop/R&B group Not Like Them (NLT).

A few years later, NLT was signed to a major label deal working under the direction of Geffen Records chairman Ron Fair. With Garland as the frontman and one of two lead singers, NLT was put in the studio to collaborate with top producers and songwriters including Pharrell, Ne-Yo and Ryan Tedder. The group opened on tour for The Pussycat Dolls and gained a small, but loyal, fan following. In 2007 NLT released their Timbaland-produced single "She Said, I Said (Time We Let Go)" and scored their first Top 40 Hit. They continued to tour, and caused a female fan girl frenzy headlining a national House of Blues tour aptly titled "The 2009 Bandemonium Tour" along with V Factory and Menudo. When the group eventually parted ways to pursue individual opportunities Garland shifted his focus back to songwriting, only this time for a solo album.

Garland was represented by JT Entertainment in 2010 according to his Myspace page. In fact, it was through Myspace that Garland was introduced to Perez Hilton. Hilton "was instantly blown away". Songs written or demoed by Garland can be viewed on YouTube, including ""Can't Believe it" (featuring Kevin McHale and RAS), and many more. Garland also covered Beyoncé's "Sweet Dreams", T.I. & Justin Timberlake's "Dead and Gone", and also P!nk's "Fuckin' Perfect". Garland wrote & demoed a song titled "Sexy Together", but passed on it; the song was eventually modified by its producers and was then sold to Justin Bieber under the title of "Never Say Never".

Garland premiered his debut single, the Danja produced "Believe" on American Idol on May 19, 2010. The single was released on iTunes the day.

Travis released a five track 'mixtape' called "The Last Man Standing" on January 11, 2011 through his official website.

In July 2011, Travis and JoJo released a song on YouTube called Paint.

Travis is currently self-managed and is signed to & working with the production group The Stereotypes. On October 22, 2012, he released a free EP on his website entitled Fashionably Late. The same week he played a sold-out show at The Roxy Theatre with Tori Kelly. On August 20, Travis released the music video for "Clouds", a single that appears on his self-titled debut album Travis Garland, which was released on September 10, 2013 to widespread acclaim.

On October 17, 2017, Travis released the song called "Curvin' Everybody" on iTunes.

On July 29, 2022, Garland's "Where To Land" is sampled on Beyonce's song "Heated". Afterwards, he released a mashup of two songs on April 29, 2023.

Garland became a contestant in Season 21 (2026) of America's Got Talent.

== Discography ==
=== Albums ===
Title	Album details	Peak chart positions	
Title	Album details	US Heat	US R&B/HH
Travis Garland	Release date: September 10, 2013; Label: Stereotypes; Format: Digital download	12	40
COVERS	Release date: April 24, 2020; Label: Indie Legend; Format: Digital download	–	–

=== Extended plays ===
Title	EP details
Motel Pool (B-Sides)	Released date: December 17, 2013; Label: Stereotypes; Formats: Digital download

==== Mixtapes ====
- 2011: The Last Man Standing
- 2012: Fashionably Late
- 2013: Fashionably Late vol. II
- 2015: UPPERS+DOWNERS vol. I
- 2017: Travis Garland

=== Singles ===
Single	Year	Peak chart positions		Album
Single	Year	US Bub.	US Heat	Album
"Believe"	2010	10	11	Non-album single
"Clouds"	2013	—	—	Travis Garland
"Motel Pool"	2013	—	—	Travis Garland
"Mr. Rogers"	2014	—	—	UPPERS+DOWNERS vol. I
"Bodies"	2015	—	—	UPPERS+DOWNERS vol. I
"Curvin' Everybody"	2017	—	—	Non-Album Singles
"Put Down Your Phone"	2019	—	—	Non-Album Singles
"Good Woman"	2019	—	—	Non-Album Singles

=== Other appearances ===
Year	Song	Artist	Album
2010	"When Does It Go Away"	JoJo	Can't Take That Away from Me
2012	"Lovetron"	Far East Movement	Dirty Bass
