= Lexicon (novel) =

2013 novel written by Max Barry

- First edition
- Author: Max Barry
- Language: English
- Genre: Novel, science fiction, thriller
- Publisher: Penguin Press
- Publication date: 18 June 2013
- Publication place: Australia
- ISBN: 1-594-20538-8
- Preceded by: Machine Man
- Followed by: Providence

Lexicon is a novel written by Max Barry. Published in 2013, it was Barry's fifth novel, following Machine Man, published two years earlier. The science fiction thriller follows a secretive organization of "poets" who use the power of language to control others.

== Plot summary ==
In a school in Virginia, children are taught the art of persuasion instead of usual subjects. They learn in detail how to handle the power of language to control other individuals by breaking them down into psychographic markers. The most successful students graduate and join a nameless, powerful and secretive organization whose members are called "poets." This society believes that revealing one's identities and feelings is extremely dangerous because it can make the mind susceptible to manipulation.

Emily Ruff, a witty orphan from San Francisco, is recruited by members of the organization and taken to the school. After passing the strange and rigorous entrance exams, she is taught the fundamentals of persuasion by Bronte, Eliot, and Lowell, who have adopted pseudonyms to conceal their true identities. Emily gradually becomes a prodigy in the school, until she commits the fatal mistake of falling in love.

Wil Parke, an apparently innocent man, is ambushed by two men in an airport bathroom, who claim that he is the key to a secret war between rival factions of poets. Wil eventually discovers that his entire past is a lie and must travel to the decimated town of Broken Hill, Australia to uncover the truth about who he is.

At the point in which Emily's and Wil's narratives conjoin, the shocking plot of the poets is revealed in full, the number of deaths increases, and the world nears a crisis event in which all language will become meaningless.

== Critical reception ==
Graham Sleight, in The Washington Post noted: "The conspiracy thriller is, of course, a common genre these days. In some ways it's an attractive notion that there might be a secret society nestling within the visible world, perceptible only to initiates. At their best, authors like Tim Powers and Umberto Eco construct astonishingly elaborate alternate histories in which fantastical events nestle between the known and documented ones...Barry's particular addition to the genre is a corrosive wit. The satirical impulse that Barry showed in earlier books like Jennifer Government (2003) is also present here. He draws analogies between the control exercised over humans by his fictional poets and the very real ways that advertisers influence us."

A Kirkus Reviewer critic wrote: "Barry (Machine Man, 2011, etc.) is usually trying to be the funny guy in the world of postmodern satire, with arrows keenly aimed at corporate greed and how to make it in advertising. Apparently, our Australian comrade has changed his mind, racing up alongside the likes of Neal Stephenson with this smart, compelling, action-packed thriller about the power of words...An up-all-night thriller for freaks and geeks who want to see their wizards all grown up in the real world and armed to the teeth in a bloody story."

== Proposed film adaptation ==
On May 30, 2012, Matthew Vaughn optioned the feature film adaptation rights to the novel.

== See also ==
- Lexicon on Max Barry's personal website
- 2013 in Australian literature
