= Private Property (1960 film) =

1960 American film by Leslie Stevens

- Theatrical release poster
- Directed by: Leslie Stevens (credited as "Dramatist-Director")
- Screenplay by: Leslie Stevens
- Produced by: Stanley Colbert
- Starring: Corey Allen; Warren Oates; Kate Manx
- Cinematography: Ted McCord A.S.C.
- Edited by: Jerry Young
- Music by: Alec Compinsky (music supervision); Pete Rugolo (uncredited)
- Distributed by: Citation Films (1960); Cineliciouspics (2016)
- Release date: April 24, 1960
- Running time: 79 minutes
- Country: United States
- Language: English
- Budget: $59,000
- Box office: $2 million (1960 release)

The full film

Private Property, sometimes known as Private Property!, is a 1960 American independent crime film, directed by Leslie Stevens and starring Corey Allen, Warren Oates and Kate Manx (Stevens' then-wife).

The film was considered disturbing at the time of its release and was condemned by the Catholic Legion of Decency. Its initial distributor went out of business, and by 1994 it had not been in circulation for 30 years, and was considered a lost film. It was restored and re-released in 2016 to critical acclaim.

== Plot ==
A pair of drifters in Duke and Boots are hanging out at a gasoline station on the Pacific Ocean. They menace the owner and steal from his store. Having been denied the touch of a woman recently, Duke promises Boots that he will fix him up with a woman. They hitch a ride with a motorist and force him to follow an attractive woman, Ann Carlyle, to her home.

The drifters break into an empty house next door, eavesdrop on her, and learn that she is unhappily married to an older man named Roger.

They proceed to manipulate the woman, but Boots fails to have relations with her. She walks outside only to see Duke lurking from behind, distressed at what he heard go on before knocking her down. Boots, seeing this, fights him in a pool that sees Duke stab and kill Boots. Roger returns home, fights Duke, and Ann shoots Duke.

== Cast ==
- Corey Allen as Duke
- Warren Oates as Boots
- Kate Manx as Ann Carlyle
- Jerome Cowan as Ed Hogate
- Robert Wark as Roger Carlyle
- Jules Maitland as gas station owner

== Production ==
Stevens and producer Colbert, a former literary agent, called themselves "America's only authentic New Wave filmmakers," and were admirers of François Truffaut and Claude Chabrol. They had "lofty ambitions for Private Property," as a result of which "the film's artiness enveloped it like the fog on California Highway One." Despite their modest budget, they were able to obtain the services of Ted McCord, an Academy Award nominated cinematographer, and Conrad Hall, a camera operator hired for his ability to shoot underwater, who went on to win three Academy Awards.

The film was produced for approximately $59,000 (one account says $59,421 and another $59,525) and shot primarily at director Stevens' home in the Hollywood Hills and a vacant house next door, with other scenes shot nearby at Malibu Beach and Sunset Boulevard. At the time of its initial release, it was denied a seal by the Motion Picture Production Code and was rated "C," or "condemned," by the Catholic National Legion of Decency for "highly suggestive sequences, dialogue and music." However it was passed without any changes by the New York Board of Censors.

The film was shot in 10 days by a crew of 37 men, with $400 of the budget going for furniture. To avoid overtime costs, the filmmakers sometimes had to stop shooting in mid-sentence. Daily Variety called it the most important film since Marty in its implications for young and independent filmmakers.

Without a production code seal, the film was not able to obtain a mainstream distributor, but it grossed about $2 million due to enthusiasm for the film in Europe.

=== Restoration and re-release ===
After years of being lost, a print was discovered and later restored by UCLA Film & Television Archive. Funding for the restoration was provided by the Packard Humanities Institute. Private Property was screened at UCLA’s annual preservation festival in 2015, and at Turner Classic Movies Classic Film Festival in 2016 and television premiere Saturday night, January 14, 2017. A Blu-ray release was planned for the summer of 2016.

== Critical response ==
At the time of its 1960 release, reviewers were repelled by the prurience of the film. One of the more favorable reviews called the film a "harrowing and extended clinical picture of physical, sexual and mental violation." A Los Angeles Times reviewer wrote that Oates and Allen are "young actors of great promise and little exposure," but a The New Yorker reviewer wrote that the acting is "uniformly dreadful." The reviewer said that Oates' character, Boots, was "like Lennie in Of Mice and Men only this time according to the Method."

Film Quarterly wrote that the film was "shaded pornography" that would offend women, and appeared to be a conscious effort to exploit the market in sex movies. The review said the film's "subliminal effects came across like sledgehammers intentionally." It said that the film failed to convey emotions, and that "Hollywood has always been addicted to its own distorted reflections of reality and Private Property is just a new example of this mythomania."

Andrew Sarris wrote that film is "more ambitious than it is" and that McCord was "hired to shoot people through brandy snifters with such affected artiness that McCord should have known better even if Stevens didn't." What lingers in the mind, he wrote, is "Stevens' flair for feelthy fetishism and the stupid blonde beauty of the late Kate Manx."

In an interview with Arthur M. Schlesinger in 1964, Jacqueline Kennedy recalled that she and John F. Kennedy viewed the film the night of the pivotal 1960 West Virginia Democratic primary because the movie they wanted to see was half over. She called Private Property "some awful, sordid thing about some murder in California—really, I mean, just morbid." She said that she and Kennedy were "terribly depressed by the movie" but were then cheered up by news of his primary win. Their friend Ben Bradlee recalled that they joked that because the film was condemned by the Legion of Decency, it would have helped him with some Catholic-hating voters in West Virginia if they had known about it.

== Critical response at re-release ==
At the time of its re-release in 2016, the film received critical acclaim. On the review aggregator website Rotten Tomatoes, 90% of 10 critics' reviews are positive, with an average rating of 6.7/10. On Metacritic, it has a score of 80% based on reviews from 6 critics, indicating "generally favorable reviews".

Film Comment said at the time of its re-release that the film was made with "enormous panache," and that director Stevens shared his former boss Orson Welles's "taste for elegant but unsettling framing."

The film was praised by The New York Times as a "genuine rediscovery." Times film critic Glenn Kenny called the film "a fascinating mélange of cinematic semiotics." and that this "tense and upsetting film has more psychological depth and empathy than the comparable sensationalist fare of its time, and shudder-inducing cinematic style to spare." Kenny praised Manx's and Allen's performances, but said that Oates "underplays what could have been a schematic 'Of Mice and Men'-derived dynamic." Allen's portrayal of "an overconfident sociopath is consistently insightful enough to make you regret that he didn’t get more roles this meaty during his career."

The Guardian critic Jordan Hoffman called the film "energetic and entertaining," and said that the film "seems, at first, mere fodder for raincoat-wearing deviants. But there’s too much negative space in the screenplay to leave it at that."

Critic Matt Zoller Seitz wrote in 2016 Private Property "deserves to be more widely seen for its ability to disturb artfully, without crude shocks, and for its sincere fascination with its characters’ tortured psyches."

== See also ==
- List of American films of 1960
- List of rediscovered films
- Private Property (2022 film), a remake of the 1960 film.
