= NLT (band) =

American boy band

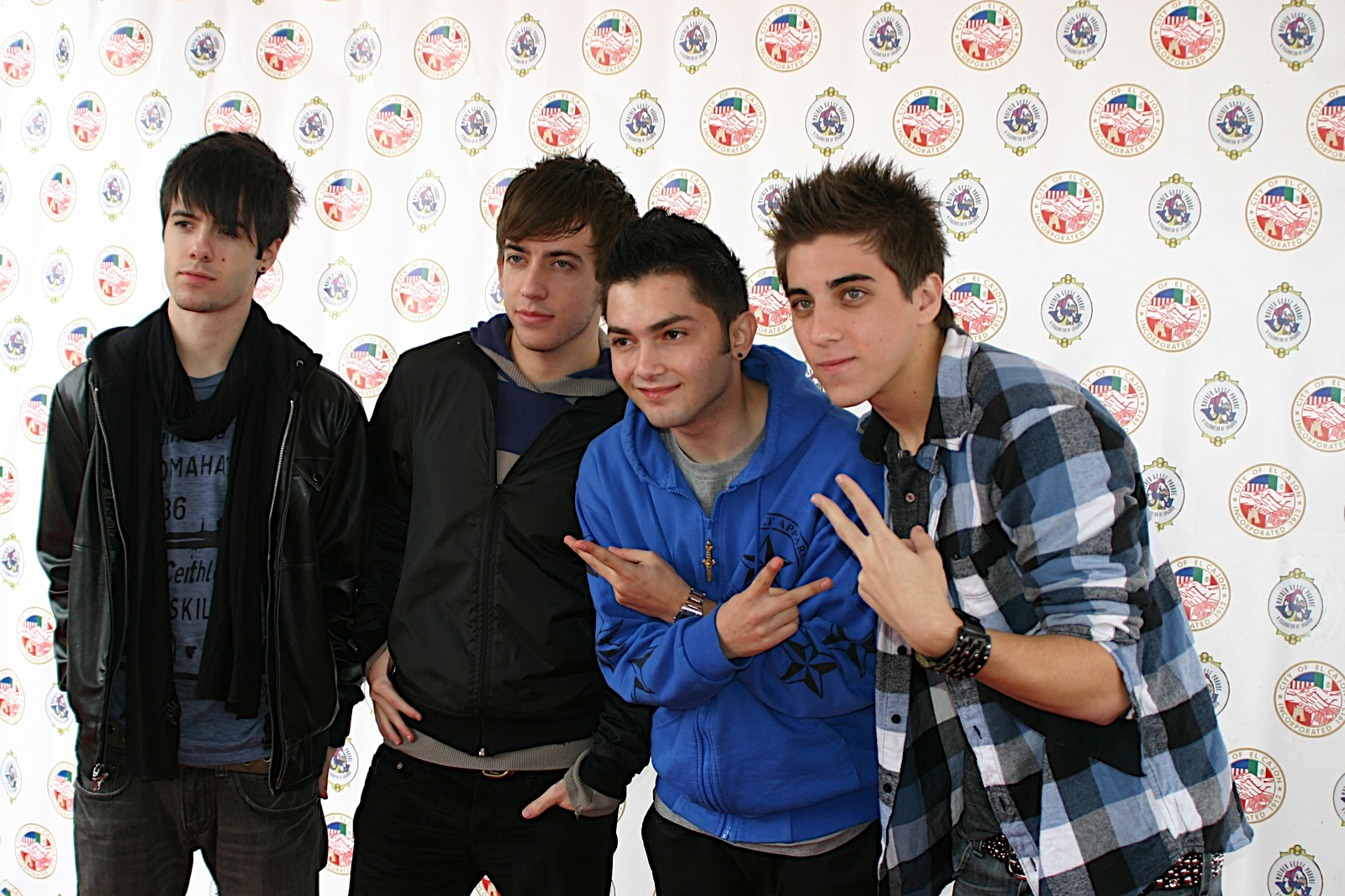
- NLT in 2008

Background information
- Origin: Dallas, Texas, U.S.
- Genres: Pop; R&B
- Years active: 2006–2009
- Label: TUG/Geffen/Interscope
- Past members: Travis Garland; Kevin McHale; Justin Joseph "JJ" Thorne; Vahe "V" Sevani
- Website: nltmusic.com

NLT (an abbreviation of Not Like Them) was an American boy band whose members were Travis Garland, Kevin McHale, Justin Joseph "JJ" Thorne, and Vahe "V" Sevani. They were discovered by Chris Stokes, who signed them to his TUG Entertainment label in 2006. Like other boy bands, NLT performances featured choreography.

== History ==
They were signed by Chris Stokes to his TUG Entertainment label in 2006. On March 13, 2007, they released their debut single, That Girl. The following month they opened (with Chantelle Paige) for the Pussycat Dolls. The group's song "Heartburn", produced by The Underdogs, was included on the soundtrack of the 2007 film Bratz: The Movie.

NLT's second single, "She Said, I Said (Time We Let Go)", was produced by Timbaland and released on August 21, 2007. It peaked at #65 on the Billboard Pop 100. On December 18, 2007, they released a Christmas single, "Silent Night". In 2008, they performed in the Johnny Wright-organized Bandemonium tour which included other boy bands Menudo and V Factory and was less than successful.

On April 15, 2008, NLT's third single, Karma, was released as a digital download. They planned to release their album Not Like Them in the summer of 2007, but the release was pushed back and ultimately cancelled. In April 2009, Garland confirmed that the group had dissolved.

== Post-NLT ==
McHale went on to appear on the TV series Glee, in the role of Artie Abrams for its entire six-season run.

Thorne became part of another (now defunct) boy band, One Call, with Anthony "AG" Gamlieli and two former members of Menudo, Chris Moy and Jose Bordonada. In 2018, he released an EP, My Laptop Was Stolen And All I Have Left Are These Songs: Mixtape.

Garland premiered his debut single, the Danja-produced "Believe" on American Idol on May 19, 2010. His debut album Travis Garland was released on September 10, 2013. Garland is still currently making music and he was a singer for DWTS

Sevani released his album Steps and a single as free downloads on his website.

== Band members ==
- Travis Garland – 1st lead vocalist, background vocals
- Kevin McHale – 2nd lead vocalist, background vocals
- Justin Joseph "JJ" Thorne – background vocals
- Vahe "V" Sevani – background vocals

== Discography ==
While NLT did not record a full album, they did release a number of singles.
