= Melinda McGraw =

American actress (born 1968)

- Born: October 25, 1968 (age 58); Nicosia, Cyprus
- Occupation: Actress
- Years active: 1988–present
- Spouse: Steve Pierson (m. 2000)
- Children: 1

Melinda McGraw (born October 25, 1968) is an American actress. She has appeared in movies such as The Dark Knight (2008), Wrongfully Accused (1998), and Skateland (2010), and is also known for her television performances on Mad Men, Men of a Certain Age, The X-Files, The West Wing, and NCIS.

== Early life and education ==
McGraw was born in Nicosia, Cyprus, to American parents.

The youngest of three daughters, she grew up in Cambridge and Dover in the Boston area. Her father served as a diplomat for the Agency of International Development before becoming an executive with a major hotel in Boston. She attended the Buckingham Browne & Nichols School in Cambridge and got her start in acting with the Boston Children's Theater.

After attending Bennington College, McGraw was accepted to the Royal Academy of Dramatic Art in London (one of only seven women admitted in her year). Theatrical performances in the West End and elsewhere in Britain followed, among them Don Carlos, The Foreigner and Twelfth Night. She returned to the U.S. in 1990.

== Career ==
McGraw's first major on-screen role was as Detective Cydavia "Cyd" Madison on The Commish (1992–1994). While on the set, she met actor Nicholas Lea and the pair dated for a few years. McGraw later earned recognition for her role as Melissa Scully, Dana Scully's ill-fated sister, in four episodes of The X-Files ("One Breath", "The Blessing Way", "Paper Clip", and "Christmas Carol"). Coincidentally, Alex Krycek, the recurring antagonist responsible for Melissa's death, was played by Nicholas Lea.

McGraw has starred in The Pursuit of Happiness (1995), Soul Man (1997–1998), Living in Captivity (1998), Wednesday 9:30 (8:30 Central) (2002), and Center of the Universe (2004). Notable guest appearances include Quantum Leap, Night Court, Seinfeld, Cybill, The Larry Sanders Show, Mad About You, The District, The Practice, and Inconceivable. She has been featured in four episodes of Desperate Housewives as Annabel Foster and was cast in Neighbors, an ABC pilot for 2005-06 that was not picked up.

In 2006, McGraw played Jane Braun, campaign advisor to presidential candidate Arnold Vinick, in several episodes of The West Wing and appeared in an episode of Bones. She played U.S. Attorney Valerie Por in Close to Home and Hartley Green in Saving Grace in 2007, as well as Annette Barron in two episodes of Journeyman.

McGraw appeared in 2008's The Dark Knight (the sequel to Batman Begins) as Lieutenant Gordon's wife, Barbara. She guest-starred in the Law & Order: SVU episode "Crush" as Samantha Copeland. She had a recurring role as seductive adulteress Bobbie Barrett in the second season of AMC's Mad Men. McGraw co-starred with Kelsey Grammer on the ABC sitcom Hank before its cancellation on November 11, 2009. She enjoyed a recurring role as Erin, Scott Bakula's love interest, on the TNT original series Men of a Certain Age in 2010–11. In 2011 and 2012, she made guest appearances in the 9th season of NCIS in the episodes "Devil's Triangle", "Devil's Trifecta" and "Devil's Triad" as Diane Sterling, an ex-wife of both Leroy Jethro Gibbs and Tobias Fornell. In season 12 of the series, her character's arc was closed when she was murdered in the episode "Check". McGraw appeared again as Diane in 2019, but as a ghost in the episode “Daughters” (season 16). In 2013, she appeared in ABC series Scandal.

== Personal life ==
McGraw is married to composer/recording artist Steve Pierson, and they have a daughter. They all belong to Pierson's band Jambo, which performs roots music for children.

== Filmography ==
=== Film ===
Year	Title	Role	Notes
1996	Albino Alligator	Jenny Ferguson	
1998	Wrongfully Accused	Cass Lake	
2000	Nutty Professor II: The Klumps	Leanne Guilford	
2008	The Dark Knight	Barbara Gordon	
2009	Weather Girl	Virginia	
2010	Skateland	Debbie Wheeler	
2011	Meeting Spencer	Didi Ravenal	
2014	The Stockwells	Carol	Short
2017	Izzy Gets the F*ck Across Town	Mrs. Percy	
2026	Ugly Cry		

=== Television ===
Year	Title	Role	Notes
1988	Rockliffe	WPC Heather Ackroyd	"Top Man"
1988	American Playhouse	Dixie	"The Big Knife"
1990	Quantum Leap	Laura Downey	"A Little Miracle"
1991	Night Court	Wendy	"To Sleep, No More"
1992	Seinfeld	Angela	"The Good Samaritan"
1992	The Human Factor	Rebecca Travis	Main role
1992–94	The Commish	Cyd Madison	Regular role
1994–97	The X-Files	Melissa Scully	"One Breath", "The Blessing Way", "Paper Clip", "Christmas Carol"
1995	The Pursuit of Happiness	Mackenzie 'Mac' Rutledge	Main role
1996	Cybill	Lana	"Cybill, Get Your Gun"
1997	The Larry Sanders Show	Alex	"Larry's New Love"
1997	House of Frankenstein	Det. Maggie Delbo	TV miniseries
1998	Mad About You	Cheryl Gendelman	"Good Old Reliable Nathan"
1998	Millennium	Dr. Stoller	"The Pest House"
1998	Living in Captivity	Becca Marek	Main role
2001	Ally McBeal	Nancy Gower	"Lost and Found"
2001–02	The District	Vicky Montgomery	Recurring role
2002	Wednesday 9:30 (8:30 Central)	Lindsay Urich	Main role
2003	Skin	Zelda Ziti	"Amber Synn", "Blowback"
2003	The Practice	Marcie Bartos	"Goodbye"
2003	It's All Relative	Kate O'Neil	"Thanks, But No Thanks"
2004–05	Center of the Universe	Lily Barnett	Main role
2005	Desperate Housewives	Annabel Foster	"Fear No More", "Sunday in the Park with George", "Goodbye for Now"
2005	Inconceivable	Suzanne Cohen	Recurring role
2006	The West Wing	Jane Braun	Recurring role
2006	Bones	Gayle Seaver	"The Truth in the Lye"
2007	Close to Home	Valerie Por	"Eminent Domain"
2007	Saving Grace	Hartley Green	"Would You Want Me to Tell You?"
2007	Journeyman	Annette Barron	"The Hanged Man", "Perfidia"
2008	Gotham Tonight	Barbara Gordon	"Billionaire Without a Cause", "Top Cop"
2008	Mad Men	Bobbie Barrett	Recurring role
2008	CSI: Miami	Beth Campbell	"Wrecking Crew"
2009	CSI: Crime Scene Investigation	Mrs. Griffin	"Miscarriage of Justice"
2009	Law & Order: Special Victims Unit	Samantha Copeland	"Crush"
2009	Legally Mad	Sylvie	unaired pilot
2009–10	Hank	Tilly Pryor	Main role
2010	Medium	Sondra Hahn-Barker	"Sal"
2010	Pleading Guilty	Elise Malloy	TV pilot
2010–11	Men of a Certain Age	Erin Riley	Main role (season 2)
2011	Have a Little Faith	Janine	TV film
2011–19	NCIS	Diane Sterling	Recurring role
2012	Harry's Law	Amanda	Recurring role
2012	Fairly Legal	Judge Victoria Connors	"Teenage Wasteland"
2012	Hawaii Five-0	Patricia Slater	"Ohuna"
2013	Ben and Kate	Vera Everson	"Girl Problems", "Bake Off", "Ethics 101"
2013	Scandal	Debora Clarkson	"Snake in the Garden"
2013	Lauren	Cynthia	"2.4", "2.11", "2.12"
2013	Family Tools	Beverly	"Book Club Romance"
2014	Glee	Clara Banks	"Old Dog, New Tricks"
2014	Delirium	Lydia	TV film
2014	Crisis	Julia Devore	Recurring role
2014–15	State of Affairs	Sen. Kyle Green	Recurring role
2015	Proof	Sasha Turing	"Private Matters", "Reborn", "Tsunami: Part Two"
2016–18	Outcast	Patricia MacCready	Supporting role
2018	The Crossing	Eve	a.k.a. Greta Pryor
2018	NCIS: New Orleans	Gina Powell	"In the Blood"
2020–21	Charmed	Vivienne Laurent	Recurring role; 6 episodes
2023	Paul T. Goldman	Audrey Munson	Main role; 5 episodes
2024	Ghosts	Diane	"Sam's Dad"
2026	9-1-1	Bonnie Sheets	"Mother’s Boy"
