= Max Barry =

Australian author

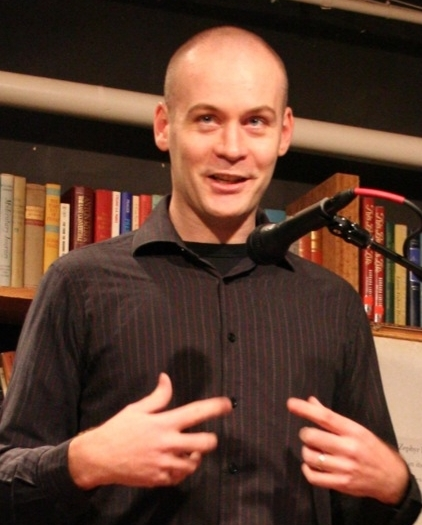
- Barry in 2006
- Born: 18 March 1973 (age 53); Stratford, Victoria, Australia
- Occupations: Novelist; Developer
- Writing career
- Genre: Humour
- Website: www.maxbarry.com

Max Barry (born 18 March 1973) is an Australian author and software developer. He also maintains a blog on various topics, including politics.

== Early life and education ==
Max Barry was born on 18 March 1973 in Stratford, Victoria, Australia.

== Career ==
When Barry published his first novel, Syrup, he spelled his name "Maxx", "because he thought it would be a funny joke about marketing", but subsequently has used "Max".

Barry is also the creator of NationStates, an online game created to help advertise his second novel, Jennifer Government, that eventually evolved into its own online community. In early 2004, Barry converted his website to a blog and began regularly posting to it.

Company, published in 2006, was his third novel. In the November 2004 issue of the magazine Fast Company the novel Company was ranked at number 8 on a list of the top 100 "people, ideas, and trends that will change how we work and live in 2005".

Barry wrote the screenplay for Syrup, which was released in theatres on 7 June 2013. Universal Pictures has acquired screen rights to Company, which will be adapted by Steve Pink. Jennifer Government was optioned by Steven Soderbergh and George Clooney's now defunct Section Eight Productions. His novel Machine Man initially was an online serial, but has since been updated and published in 2011 by Vintage Books. The film rights have been picked up by Mandalay Pictures.

== Bibliography ==
=== Novels ===
- Syrup (1999), ISBN 0-14-029187-3
- Jennifer Government (2003), ISBN 1-4000-3092-7
- Company (2006), ISBN 0-385-51439-5
- Machine Man (2011), ISBN 0-307-47689-8
- Lexicon (2013), ISBN 1-594-20538-8
- Providence (2020), ISBN 978-0-593-08517-2
- The 22 Murders of Madison May (2021), ISBN 978-0-593-08520-2
- Discordia (2021) (audio only)
