= Syrup (novel) =

Novel by Maxx Barry

- First edition cover
- Author: Maxx Barry
- Language: English
- Genre: Satirical novel
- Publisher: Viking Press
- Publication date: July 1999
- Publication place: Australian
- Media type: Print (Hardback & Paperback)
- Pages: 320 pp (first edition, hardback)
- ISBN: 0-670-88640-8 (first edition, hardback)
- OCLC: 40408909
- Dewey Decimal: 813/.54 21
- LC Class: PS3552.A7424 S97 1999
- Followed by: Jennifer Government

Syrup is a 1999 novel by Max Barry. Written under the pen name Maxx Barry, the novel satirizes American consumerism and corporate marketing strategies. It was adapted into the 2013 film Syrup.

== Plot ==
Scat, a fresh marketing graduate, invents a new Coca-Cola product called 'Fukk'. He tries to sell his idea to the company for $3 million, but discovers his roommate and friend Sneaky Pete has already claimed the trademark. This leads Scat to move out of their shared apartment and stay with Cindy, his on-and-off girlfriend. She eventually kicks him out, and he ends up living with 6, a marketing executive, and Tina, her film student roommate. Scat leads the summer marketing campaign for Coca-Cola and makes it a success. He then attempts to thwart Sneaky Pete from sabotaging his next project for Coca-Cola: the first ever feature-length advertising film.

== Coca-Cola BlāK ==
In 2006, Coca-Cola introduced a coffee-flavored soft drink called Coca-Cola BlāK, first released in France in a black can. Barry commented on the similarities of this and his novel’s fictional Coca-Cola Fukk on his blog.

== Release details ==
- 1999, UK, Viking Press (ISBN 0-670-88640-8), Pub date ? July 1999, hardback (First edition)
- 2000, UK, Penguin Books (ISBN 0-14-029187-3), Pub date ? July 2000, paperback
