= Private Property (2022 film) =

- Official release poster
- Directed by: Chadd Harbold
- Written by: Chadd Harbold
- Based on: Private Property by Leslie Stevens
- Produced by: Chadd Harbold; Shiloh Fernandez, Greg Lauritano; Lucas Jarach; Ryan R. Johnson; Luke Daniels; Shaun Sanghani
- Starring: Ashley Benson; Shiloh Fernandez
- Music by: Com Truise
- Production company: Redwire Pictures
- Distributed by: Lionsgate
- Release date: May 13, 2022
- Country: United States
- Language: English

Private Property is a 2022 American thriller film directed by Chadd Harbold and starring Ashley Benson and Shiloh Fernandez. It is a remake of the 1960 film of the same title.

== Plot summary ==
The movie opens on a crime scene. Body floating face down in the pool. Flashes back to "the day before yesterday." Kathyrn is narrating her life to a video camera. She's cleaning house (very unconvincingly) when she receives a phone call from the gardening company (Ed in disguise). Her gardener has been arrested and they sent someone new, Ben. He shows up as she's ending the call. She's locked herself out of the house and he picks the lock to let her back in. As they are winding down for the evening, her husband goes to the garage and Ed is watching him without being seen.

Yesterday

Once her husband leaves for work, she has lemonade with Ben on the patio and they discuss their lives. He's a rapper and she's an actress. She offends him with her comments and he told her not to make fun of him. She asked to hear his music. He gives her an impromptu rap. (He REALLY shouldn't quit his day job). He jumps in her pool in his jeans. She asks Ben to fix her wobbly table and he does as she watches on.

Another flashback showing Ben and Ed to be criminals.

Long story short, he falls in love with her, he and his friend Ed (Oates) are actually bad guys. They attack her, Ed can't perform, Ben (Duke) kills him. Richard comes home and Ben attacks him, Kathryn shoots him with the framed gun in their house. The End.

== Cast ==
- Ashley Benson as Kathryn Carlyle
- Shiloh Fernandez as Ben
- Logan Miller as Oates
- Frank Whaley as Ed Hogate
- Jay Pharoah as Richard
- King Orba as The Mechanic

== Production ==
Filming wrapped in Los Angeles in August 2021.

== Release ==
The film had a limited release in theaters and was fully released on demand and digital on May 13, 2022.

== Reception ==
The film received negative reviews. It has a 13% rating on Rotten Tomatoes based on eight reviews.
