= Tyler James discography =

- Studio albums: 2
- Singles: 5

The discography of Tyler James, a British singer-songwriter, consists of two studio album, and five singles. After guesting on the underground R&B track "Wilder" by Stargate in 2001, which became a nightclub favourite in London, James got his first taste of celebrity. In 2002, after touring around the UK's bars, pubs and clubs; evolving his sound and performance, James had garnered enough reputation to be hailed as "The British answer to Justin Timberlake" by The Face magazine, whilst NME hailed him as "one to watch".

Tyler James was signed to Island Records in 2003 after they heard a demo tape featuring his future debut single, "Why Do I Do?". The reggae flavoured song made the 'A' playlist on BBC Radio 2, and entered the UK Singles Chart at number 25. In early 2005, James toured with Natasha Bedingfield and in the spring of 2005, his second single "Foolish" was released, which reached number 16 on the UK Singles Chart. July 2005, James' third single was released. Originally a number 1 hit for White Town, James covered "Your Woman". "Your Woman" reached number 60, whilst his album The Unlikely Lad was released as a digital download in August 2005. The album includes three songs co-written with Amy Winehouse, who also features on the track "Best for Me".

The singer-songwriter returned in 2012, when he appeared as a contestant on the first series of The Voice UK—finishing as the series' runner-up behind Leanne Mitchell. It was confirmed in July 2012 that James had signed a new joint record deal with Island Records and Universal Music Group and had begun work on his second studio album. James then announced in August that the album's lead single, "Single Tear", would be released in the United Kingdom on 7 October, with the album A Place I Go following on 29 October. In February 2013 he released "Worry About You" as the second single from A Place I Go, the song features vocals from Kano.

== Albums ==
=== Studio albums ===
Title	Album details	Peak chart positions
Title	Album details	UK
The Unlikely Lad	Released: 29 August 2005; Label: Island Records; Formats: CD, digital download	— (Note: "The Unlikely Lad" did not enter the Official UK Album Chart upon release, but later peaked at number 34 on the Official UK Album Downloads Chart in June 2012.)
A Place I Go	Released: 29 October 2012; Label: Island Records; Formats: CD, digital download	47
"—" denotes album that did not chart or was not released.

== Singles ==
=== As lead artist ===
Year	Title	Peak chart positions	Album
Year	Title	UK	Album
2004	"Why Do I Do?"	25	The Unlikely Lad
2005	"Foolish"	16	The Unlikely Lad
2005	"Your Woman"	60	The Unlikely Lad
2012	"Single Tear"	28	A Place I Go
2013	"Worry About You" (featuring Kano)	38	A Place I Go
"—" denotes single that did not chart or was not released.

=== As featured artist ===
Year	Title	Notes
2012	"Wish I Belonged" (Urban Classics featuring Fazer, BBC Symphony Orchestra, Angel, Stooshe & Tyler James)	In aid of Children in Need.

== Other charted songs ==
Year	Title	Peak chart positions	Album
Year	Title	UK	Album
2012	"Higher Love"	39	A Place I Go

== Guest appearances ==
Year	Song	Album
2001	"Wilder" (Stargate featuring Tyler James)	Non-album single
2012	"Higher Love"	The Voice UK, The Final 8 – The Album
2012	"Sign Your Name"	The Voice UK, The Final 8 – The Album
2012	"Wish I Belonged" (Urban Classics featuring Fazer, BBC Symphony Orchestra, Angel, Stooshe & Tyler James)	Non-album single
