= Dinah Jane discography =

Discography of American singer Dinah Jane

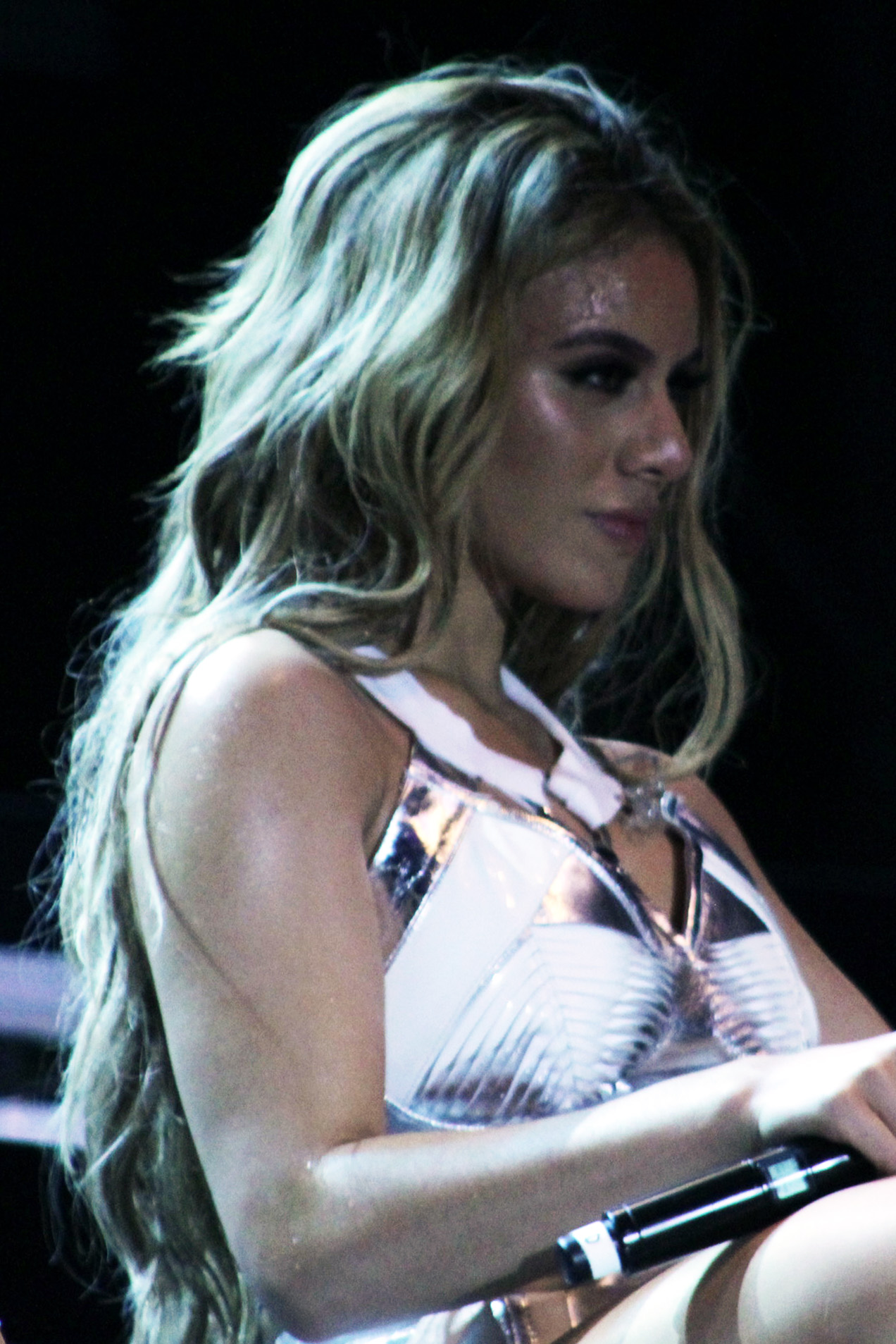
- EPs: 2
- Singles: 14
- Promotional singles: 3

American singer Dinah Jane has released two extended plays (EP), 14 singles, and three promotional singles. In 2012, she auditioned as a solo contestant in the second season of The X Factor. After being eliminated as a solo performer, Jane was brought back into the competition along with four other girls to form the girl group Fifth Harmony. The group would go on to release the albums Reflection (2015), 7/27 (2016), and Fifth Harmony (2017).

Jane's first solo venture was with the song "Boom Boom", released in October 2017, alongside producer RedOne, and rappers Daddy Yankee and French Montana. Following the group's hiatus, Jane released her debut solo single "Bottled Up" on September 21, 2018, which featured American singers Marc E. Bassy and Ty Dolla Sign. Its music video was released in November. She released her debut EP Dinah Jane 1, on April 19, 2019, with the lead and only single "Heard It All Before" released the same day alongside a music video. During May and July, Jane released the songs "Retrograde", and "SZNS" featuring American rapper A Boogie wit da Hoodie. She released the promotional singles "1501" and "Lottery", both in March. The single "Missed a Spot" was released on April 2, two months after its initial Valentine's Day release date.

After a three-year break, Jane released her comeback single "Ya Ya" on August 22, 2023; its music video highlights the singer's Polynesian roots. This was followed by the collaboration "Falling in Love" with JKing in September and "Sway (Remix)" with Myshaan in February 2024. Jane collaborated with former bandmate Ally Brooke on the cover for "Have Yourself a Merry Little Christmas", released on December 1 as a track of Brooke's Christmas EP Under the Tree. In May, July and August 2024, she released the singles "Ocean Song", "Road Less Travelled", and "Let's Go" (with Young Go and JKing). On August 25, Jane announced her second EP, titled Juice County Volume 1, which was released on August 30.

== Extended plays ==
Title	Details
Dinah Jane 1	Released: April 19, 2019; Label: Hitco; Formats: Digital download, streaming
Juice County Volume 1	Released: August 30, 2024; Label: Slash Studios; Formats: Digital download, streaming

== Singles ==
=== As lead artist ===
List of singles as lead artist, showing year released, with selected chart positions and album name
Title	Year	Peak chart positions							Album
Title	Year	US Digital	US Latin	US Rhy	MEX	NZ Hot	SPA	SWI	Album
"Boom Boom" (with RedOne, Daddy Yankee and French Montana)	2017	50	24	—	30	—	33	90	Non-album singles
"Bottled Up" (featuring Marc E. Bassy and Ty Dolla Sign)	2018	—	—	28	—	13	—	—	Non-album singles
"Heard It All Before"	2019	—	—	—	—	—	—	—	Dinah Jane 1
"Retrograde"	2019	—	—	—	—	—	—	—	Non-album singles
"SZNS" (featuring A Boogie wit da Hoodie)	2019	—	—	—	—	—	—	—	Non-album singles
"Missed a Spot"	2020	—	—	—	—	—	—	—	Non-album singles
"Ya Ya"	2023	—	—	—	—	—	—	—	Juice County Volume 1
"Falling in Love" (with JKing)	2023	—	—	—	—	—	—	—	Non-album single
"Have Yourself a Merry Little Christmas" (with Ally Brooke)	2023	—	—	—	—	—	—	—	Under the Tree
"Sway" (Remix) (with Myshaan)	2024	—	—	—	—	—	—	—	Non-album singles
"Another Lifetime" (with Rose on the Moon)	2024	—	—	—	—	—	—	—	Non-album singles
"Ocean Song"	2024	—	—	—	—	—	—	—	Juice County Volume 1
"Road Less Traveled"	2024	—	—	—	—	—	—	—	Juice County Volume 1
"Let's Go" (featuring Young Go and JKing)	2024	—	—	—	—	—	—	—	Juice County Volume 1
"—" denotes releases that did not chart or were not released in that territory.

=== Promotional singles ===
List of promotional singles, showing year released and album name
Title	Year	Album
"Dancing Like a White Girl"	2011	Non-album promotional singles
"Lottery"	2020	Non-album promotional singles
"1501"	2020	Non-album promotional singles

== Music videos ==
Title	Year	Other performer(s) credited	Director(s)	Ref.
"Boom Boom"	2017	RedOne, Daddy Yankee, and French Montana	Saïd C. Naciri	
"Bottled Up"	2018	Ty Dolla Sign and Marc E. Bassy	Hannah Lux Davis	
"Heard It All Before"	2019	None	Unknown	
"Retrograde"	2019	None	Unknown	
"Missed A Spot" (Animated Visualizer)	2020	None	Unknown	
"Ya Ya"	2023	None	Carlos Dupouy	
"Falling In Love"	2023	JKING	Unknown	
"Sway (Remix)"	2024	Myshaan	Myshaan	
"Ocean Song"	2024	None	Brandon Chen	
"Road Less Traveled"	2024	None	Brandon Chen	
