= SZNS =

Single by Dinah Jane featuring A Boogie wit da Hoodie
- Released: July 25, 2019
- Recorded: Summer 2018
- Genre: R&B
- Length: 3:40
- Label: Hitco
- Songwriters: Murphy Homes; Darryl Pittman; Jeffrey Gitelman; Karin Thornton; Laron James; Dinah Jane; Artist Dubose; Jonathan Rotem; Cameron Giles; Lionel Richie
- Producer: J.R. Rotem

Dinah Jane singles chronology
"Retrograde" (2019)	"SZNS" (2019)	"Missed a Spot" (2020)

A Boogie wit da Hoodie singles chronology
"Right Back" (2019)	"SZNS" (2019)	"Ouh Mädchen" (2019)

"SZNS" (pronounced "seasons") is a song by American singer Dinah Jane featuring American rapper A Boogie wit da Hoodie. The song was released on July 25, 2019.

== Background ==
"SZNS" follows the release of Dinah's eponymous three-track bundle in April, which showcased her creative growth with the confident "Heard It All Before", moody "Pass Me By", and confessional "Fix It". The song has 90's R&B vibes with verses such as "Summer through the winter, we been through it / Might fall, but spring back to it," that show an optimistic love of a romantic relationship. "Hey Ma" by Cam'ron (featuring Juelz Santana, Freekey Zekey and Toya) is introduced in the first verse as an interpolation to Nelly and Kelly Rowland's "Dilemma" and Tupac's "Thugz Mansion". The song paid homage to Mariah Carey's song "Always Be My Baby." The track was recorded in the summer of 2018 but Jane chose to begin her solo career with the more energetic "Bottled Up" featuring Marc E. Bassy and Ty Dolla Sign that September. "SZNS" was always planned to be a duet but when originally recorded only featured a male demo singer alongside Jane; when her team suggested asking A Boogie wit da Hoodie to feature on the track Jane was instantly on board, saying that "his lyrics really spoke to me" for being "so raw, real and 100 percent vulnerable".

== Reception ==
"SZNS" received generally positive reviews from critics. All Noise called the track "another great song" from Jane which "looks like another hit". Mike Neid, writing for Idolator, complimented the song's "sweet production", calling it a "good match" for Jane's voice, and commented that "the duo does a great job sharing airspace on the track". Madeline Roth of MTV called "SZNS" "delightfully optimistic" and "refreshingly natural and fun" for breaking the "traditional formula" of collaborations with the two artists "sporadically" trading lines over the "sunny beat". HYPEBAE's Robyn Mowatt called the song a "riveting track" and praised the "vivid" R&B influences present on the track, calling the melody "catchy yet memorable".
