= Worry About You =

Worry About You may refer to:

- "Worry About You" (Tyler James song)
- "Worry About You" (Ivy song)
- "Worry About You", a song by 2AM Club from album What Did You Think Was Going to Happen?

== See also ==
- "I Worry About You", also spelled "I Worry 'Bout You", a song written by Norman Mapp
