= Peek & Poke (album) =

Studio album by White Town
- Released: 23 May 2000
- Recorded: Late 1999
- Length: 52:11
- Label: Bzangy
- Producer: Jyoti Mishra

White Town chronology
Women in Technology (1997)	Peek & Poke (2000)	Don't Mention The War (2006)

Singles from Peek & Poke
- 1. "Another Lover" Released: March 1999

Professional ratings
Review scores
Source	Rating
AllMusic	1.5/5 stars
The A.V. Club	Favorable
Spin	7/10

Peek & Poke is the third studio album by British indie pop musical project White Town, released in 2000 through Mishra's label Bzangy Records.

The lead single, "Another Lover", was released as an EP in March 1999. Mishra released the EP via Parasol, the independent record label which had released his material prior to the success of "Your Woman" and its parent album.

== Track listing ==
All tracks are written by Jyoti Mishra

No.	Title	Length
1.	"Another Lover"	3:35
2.	"Why I Hate Drugs"	3:57
3.	"Duplicate"	3:44
4.	"Every Second Counts"	4:08
5.	"Anyway"	4:02
6.	"In My Head"	5:48
7.	"Bunny Boiler"	1:00
8.	"She Left For Paris"	4:10
9.	"Theme For Alan Mathison Turing"	1:50
10.	"I'm Alone"	2:16
11.	"The Story Of My Life"	3:31
12.	"Experts From An Essay"	13:41
