= Dinah Jane =

American singer (born 1997)

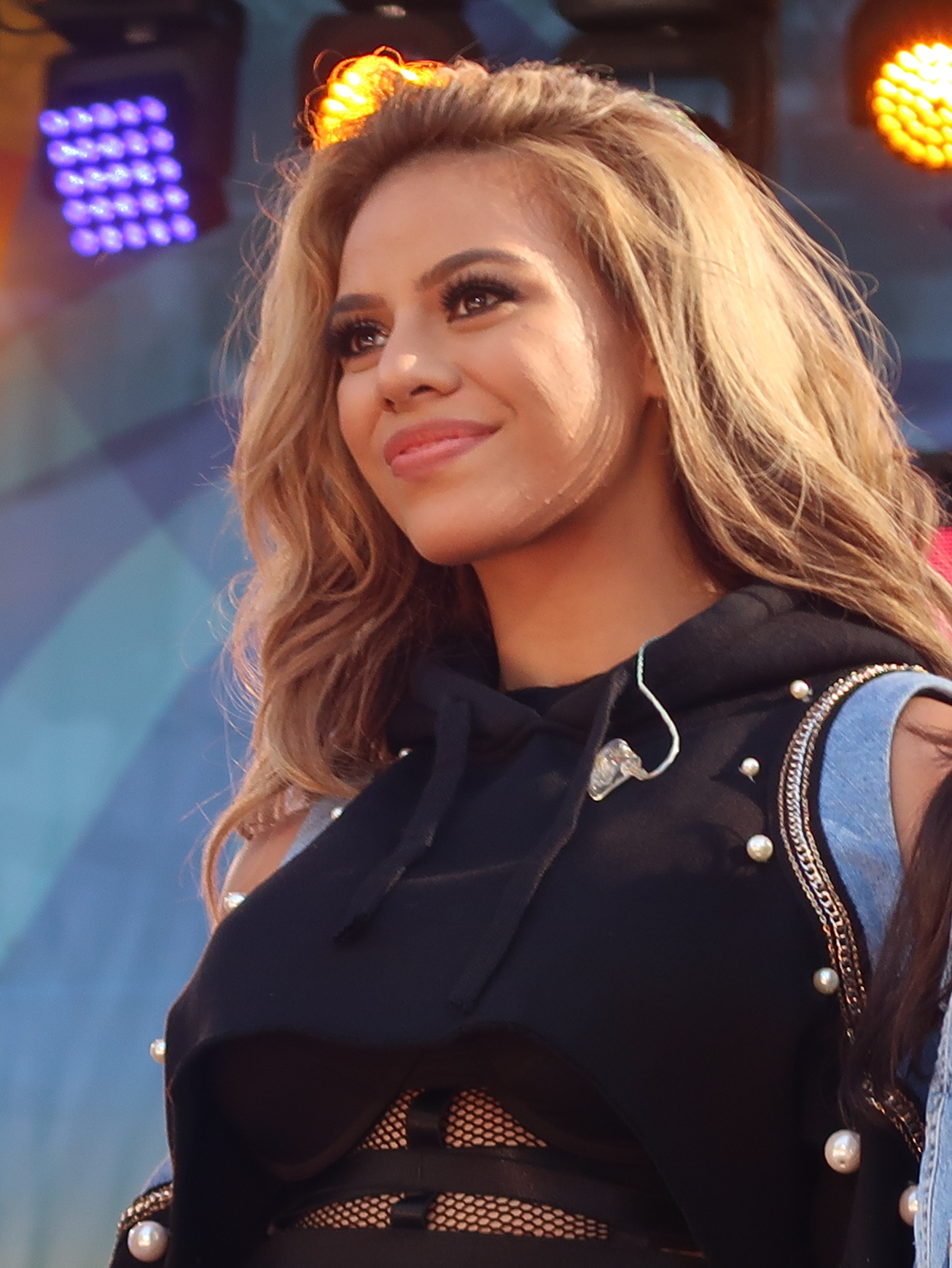
- Jane in 2017
- Born: Dinah Jane Milika Ilaisaane Hansen; June 22, 1997 (age 29); Santa Ana, California, U.S.
- Occupation: Singer
- Years active: 2011–present
- Works: Discography (Note: For her works with Fifth Harmony, see Fifth Harmony discography and List of songs recorded by Fifth Harmony)
- Musical career
- Genres: Pop; R&B
- Labels: Epic; Syco; Hitco; Slash Studios
- Formerly of: Fifth Harmony

Dinah Jane Milika Ilaisaane Hansen (/ˈdaɪnə/; born June 22, 1997) is an American singer. In 2012, she auditioned for the second season of The X Factor and later became a member of Fifth Harmony, which went on to become one of the best-selling girl groups of all time. After the group's hiatus announcement in 2018, Jane began working as a solo artist.

She signed to Hitco Entertainment and released her debut single "Bottled Up", featuring Ty Dolla Sign and Marc E. Bassy in late 2018. Her debut extended play (EP), Dinah Jane 1 was released in April 2019, and was followed by a string of standalone singles up until 2020, after which Jane took a musical hiatus. She made her comeback with the single "Ya Ya" in August 2023. A year later, she released her second EP, Juice County Volume 1, via Slash Studios.

== Early life ==
Dinah Jane grew up in Santa Ana, California, and is the daughter of Gordon Hansen and Milika Amasio. She is the eldest of 8 children and grew up with over 24 family members in her home. Jane is of Samoan, Tongan, Fijian and Danish descent. She is a member of the Church of Jesus Christ of Latter-day Saints.

Raised in a musical family, Jane was introduced to music at the age of 4. She performed in public for the first time at age seven singing the U.S. national anthem, and sang at local events in Orange County. In 2011, she recorded her first song "Dancing Like a White Girl". She graduated from Orange County School of the Arts in 2015.

== Career ==
=== 2012–2018: The X Factor and Fifth Harmony ===
Jane auditioned for The X Factor in 2012, singing "If I Were a Boy" by Beyoncé. For her bootcamp solo performance, she sang "Hero" (by Mariah Carey), and was the only member from Fifth Harmony to have her performance aired. She sang against Diamond White for her bootcamp round, performing Kelly Clarkson's song "Stronger (What Doesn't Kill You)"; after forgetting some of the lyrics during her performance, Dinah Jane was eliminated during the bootcamp round. She was ultimately brought-back to the competition, along with Ally Brooke, Normani, Lauren Jauregui, and Camila Cabello, to form the girl group Fifth Harmony. The group made it all the way to the finals and landed in third place.

Fifth Harmony's debut song was "Miss Movin' On". They released their debut EP, Better Together, in 2013, followed by their first album, Reflection (January 2015), and their sophomore album, 7/27 (May 2016). These first two albums generated the hit singles "Worth It" and "Work from Home", respectively, which reached the top 10 on several international charts. The group also contributed music to the soundtrack of the animated film Hotel Transylvania 2, performing their song "I'm in Love with a Monster". They released their self-titled third studio album—and first as a quartet, following Cabello's departure—on August 25, 2017. On March 19, 2018, the group announced an indefinite hiatus to focus on solo projects.

=== 2015–2020: Solo work and Dinah Jane 1 ===
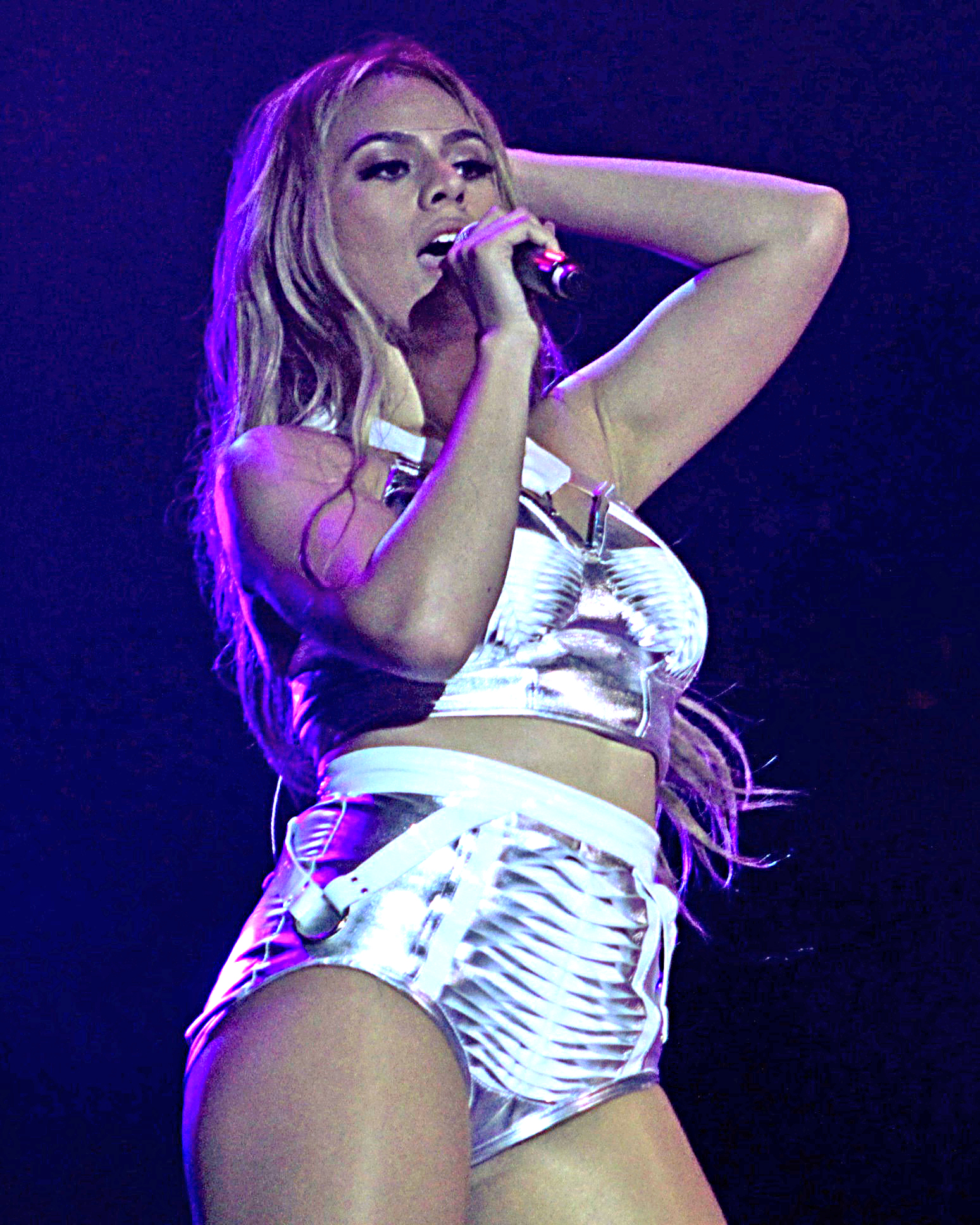
Jane performing at the LA County Fair in 2017

In 2015, Jane auditioned to play the role of the main character in the then-upcoming animated film Moana; however, the role eventually went to Auliʻi Cravalho. Fuse's website included Jane on an article of the faces of future Asian and Pacific history, naming the most promising entertainers of the region in 2017. She was featured in RedOne's song "Boom Boom" along with Daddy Yankee and French Montana. The single was released in October 2017. The following month, Jane sang the Tongan national anthem "Ko e fasi ʻo e tuʻi ʻo e ʻOtu Tonga" at the 2017 Rugby League World Cup semi-final game. Jane released a Christmas medley with singer Leona Lewis in December 2017.

In August 2018, it was announced that Jane had signed a solo record deal with Hitco Entertainment, founded by L.A. Reid and Charles Goldstuck. She released her debut solo single "Bottled Up" featuring Ty Dolla Sign and Marc E. Bassy, along with its lyric video, on September 21, 2018. She released the song's music video and performed the single on The Tonight Show Starring Jimmy Fallon in October 2018. Jane performed two new songs "Retrograde" and "I Don't Mind" at the Jingle Bash on December 3, 2018. On March 26, 2019, Jane released the music video to her then-unreleased song "Retrograde".

On March 28, 2019, Jane announced the release of her debut solo EP, Dinah Jane 1, for April 19, 2019. She released the song "Heard It All Before", followed by its music video, as the EP's lead single on April 19. In May, Jane officially released "Retrograde" for digital download and streaming, followed by "SZNS" featuring A Boogie wit da Hoodie in July. In January 2020, she announced a solo tour following her first few headline shows during 2019. Titled the Dinah Jane World Tour, it would begin in April 2020 in Arizona and travel to other US locations before performing in selected cities in Europe. Indonesian singer Agnez Mo was to be her opening act. Coinciding with her tour announcement, Jane announced a new single to be released on February 14, 2020, titled "Missed a Spot". However, the single was pushed back, with Jane releasing two promotional singles titled "Lottery" and "1501" on March 13 and 20, respectively, instead. "Missed a Spot" was released on April 2, with an animated visualizer released on YouTube the following day. The tour was postponed due to the COVID-19 pandemic.

=== 2023–present: Post-pandemic return and Juice County Volume 1 ===
On August 22, 2023, after taking a break from recording and performing for over three years, Jane released her comeback single "Ya Ya" via Slash Studios as the lead-in to a larger then-upcoming project. The song's music video puts a spotlight on Jane's Polynesian roots, which she intends to showcase more in her new music. In an interview with Zach Sang, Jane teased several songs, including "Lole" and "Tell Me". Since her comeback, she has also released the collaborative singles "Falling in Love" with JKing on September 22, 2023 and a remix of "Sway" with Myshaan on February 10, 2024.

On December 1, 2023, Jane's collaborative cover of "Have Yourself a Merry Little Christmas" with her Fifth Harmony bandmate Ally Brooke was released as part of Brooke's holiday EP Under the Tree. The song marked the first musical collaboration between any members of Fifth Harmony since their 2018 hiatus. The duo performed the song together on The Kelly Clarkson Show on December 21, 2023.

On May 17, 2024, Jane released "Ocean Song", followed by "Road Less Traveled" on July 16. On August 21, she released "Let's Go" featuring Young Go and JKing. On August 25, Jane announced her second extended play Juice County Volume 1, which was released on August 30.

On November 29, as part of the promotional campaign for Juice County: Volume 1, she was featured on the cover of ÖMC Dergi, recognized as Turkey's leading digital music and culture magazine, for its November issue.

Describing the about album process in an interview with Alp Kılıç, she said that

"The process of completing my first-ever EP was so fun, yet kind of stressful, trying to select which tracks belonged in the first package! I was scrambling with my list because there were so many favorites and ideas, but as time went on, I was able to hone in on how I wanted to visually and sonically represent what Juice County: Volume 1 means to me. Being born and raised in Orange County, California, I also wanted to give that SoCal Polynesian girl aesthetic."

== Influences ==
Jane has described her music as "urban R&B ... meets '90s to 2000s". Her musical influences are Christina Aguilera, Patti LaBelle, Toni Braxton, Brandy Norwood, Beyoncé, Leona Lewis, Mariah Carey, Whitney Houston, Lauryn Hill and Etta James.

== Discography ==
=== Extended plays ===
- Dinah Jane 1 (2019)
- Juice County Volume 1 (2024)

== Filmography ==
As herself
Year	Name	Notes
2012–2013	The X Factor U.S.	22 episodes (2012); Guest: 1 episode (2013)
2014	Faking It	Episode: "The Ecstasy and the Agony"
2015	Barbie: Life in the Dreamhouse	Episode: "Sisters' Fun Day"
2015	Taylor Swift: The 1989 World Tour Live	Concert film
2016	The Ride	Episode: "Fifth Harmony"
2018	Lip Sync Battle	Episode: "Fifth Harmony"
2018	Sugar	1 episode
2018	The After Party	Netflix film
2019	Wild 'n Out	Season 14, Episode 1

== Tours ==
=== Headlining ===
- The Road Less Traveled Tour (2024)

== Awards and nominations ==
Year	Award	Category	Nominated work	Result
2017	BMI London Awards	Pop Award Songs	"All in My Head (Flex)"	Won
2018	BMI Pop Awards	Award Winning Songs	"All in My Head (Flex)"	Won
2018	Teen Choice Awards	Choice Latin Song	"Boom Boom" (with RedOne, Daddy Yankee and French Montana)	Nominated
2019	IHeartRadio Music Awards	Best Solo Breakout	Herself	Nominated
