= Don't Mention the War =

Studio album by White Town
- Released: 23 October 2006
- Genre: Electronic
- Length: 37:17
- Label: Bzangy
- Producer: Jyoti Mishra

White Town chronology
Peek & Poke (2000)	Don't Mention the War (2006)	Monopole (2011)

Singles from Don't Mention the War
- 1. "A New Surprise" Released: 2006

Professional ratings
Review scores
Source	Rating
AllMusic	4.5/5 stars
Q	3/5 stars
Uncut	2/5 stars

Don't Mention the War is the fourth studio album by British indie pop musical project White Town, released in 2006 through Bzangy Records. The title is a dual reference to "The Germans", an episode of the English sitcom Fawlty Towers, and to the Iraq War.

== Track listing ==
All tracks are written by Jyoti Mishra

No.	Title	Length
1.	"Make the World Go Away"	3:32
2.	"A New Surprise"	2:28
3.	"Somewhere Blue"	3:23
4.	"I Was Trotsky's Nun"	2:39
5.	"These Are the MPs"	3:46
6.	"Hold It In"	3:41
7.	"Death in Kettering"	2:49
8.	"Fanfare for Emma Goldman"	1:14
9.	"Whenever I Say Hello"	4:19
10.	"Theme for a BBC Natural History Series Presented by Richard Dawkins"	2:10
11.	"The Straight-Edge Atheists' Hymn"	3:17
12.	"Sabrina, Won't You Help Us Out?"	3:59
