= You & Me (Marc E. Bassy song) =

Single by Marc E. Bassy featuring G-Eazy

from the album Groovy People and Gossip Columns
- Released: May 6, 2016
- Genre: Reggae-pop; pop
- Length: 3:38
- Label: Republic
- Songwriters: Marc Griffin; Gerald Gillum; James Hau; Selena Sloan; Rami Dawod; Jacob Olofsson; William Mosgrove
- Producers: Dawod; Olofsson; Mosgrove; Alex Hau

Marc E. Bassy singles chronology
""Cut the Lights"" (2015)	"You & Me" (2016)	"Some Kind of Drug" (2016)

G-Eazy singles chronology
"Give It Up" (2016)	"You & Me" (2016)	"Make Me..." (2016)

"You & Me" is a song by American singer Marc E. Bassy, released as the lead single from his second extended play, Groovy People (2016). It features the vocal collaboration of American rapper G-Eazy. The song was first released to digital download on May 6, 2016, and later serviced to contemporary hit and rhythmic radio by Republic. "You & Me" is a reggae-pop track, receiving positive reviews from music critics for its "summer feeling".

Commercially, the song has since reached a peak of number 58 on the US Billboard Hot 100, number 150 on the UK Singles Chart and number 52 on the Australian ARIA Singles Chart. Its music video was released on May 20, 2016, and was directed by Mike Ho.

== Background and release ==
"G-Eazy and I have developed a good chemistry working together on his album and touring. He really puts on for the Bay Area so having him on my first official single really kept it right."

— Bassy, during the interview with Complex.

"You & Me" was written by Marc E. Bassy (credited as Marc Griffin), Gerald Gillum, James Hau, Selena Sloan, Rami Dawod, Jacob Olofsson and William Mosgrove; the latter three and James Alex Hau are also the producers. The song serves as the lead single and opening track to his second extended play, Groovy People (2016), which debuted and peaked at number 148 on the Billboard 200. This is the second collaboration by Bassy and G-Eazy, following "Some Kind of Drug", a track on G-Eazy's third studio album When It's Dark Out (2015), peaking at number 24 on the US Bubbling Under Hot 100 Singles chart.

Before the official single release of "You & Me", Bassy initially premiered a one-minute snippet of the song through his official SoundCloud. On May 6, 2016, the song was finally released as the single on iTunes Store by Republic Records. About three weeks later, it was sent to rhythmic contemporary radio and contemporary hit radio in the following month. The music video for the single was released on May 20, 2016.

== Composition and reception ==
"You & Me" (2016)
A 30 second sample of "You & Me", where a portion of the chorus is heard.

"You & Me" is a reggae and pop track, lasting for a duration of three minutes and thirty eight seconds. It is composed in the key of D♭ and is set in time signature of common time, with a moderate tempo of 92 beats per minute. The song has a basic sequence of Gb-Db(second inversion)-Db(first inversion)-Bb as its chord progression. "You & Me" lyrics are the recall to memories the singer shared with a girl, and hoping she forgot anything about him. In the chorus, Bassy sings: If we bump into each other / On a crowded street / It's not us no more / It's just you and me / We're just strangers in passing casually.

Zach Frydenlund of Complex labelled the record a soothing reggae-pop track, describing Bassy and G-Eazy setting fans up for summer with vibes that are perfect for a relaxing day on the beach with your significant other. He also praised that Bassy's powerful vocals help drive home the sensual lyrics before G-Eazy comes onto the song with a memorable verse that matches perfectly over the funky production.

Rose Lilah of Hotnewhiphop praised the track funky, feel-good and basically sounds like summer in the span 3 minutes and 38 seconds. She also said the song is extremely pop-leaning and reflecting on a recent break-up, and going from "us" to simply "you and me."

== Commercial performance ==
"You & Me" initially peaked at number 18 on the US Bubbling Under Hot 100 Singles chart, before debuting on the US Billboard Hot 100 at number 91 in the week of July 30, 2016. The following week the song jumped to number 80, and later stayed at number 77 for three weeks. The song has currently peaked at number 58, in the week of September 24, 2016, becoming Bassy's first and highest Billboard Hot 100-charting song. On the Pop Digital Songs chart, the song debuted at number 47 and went to a peak at number 30 in its third week, also becoming his first and highest charted single on the Pop charts.

In Australia, "You & Me" debuted on the ARIA Charts on the week of August 13, 2016 at number 100 as the EP Groovy People and reached a peak of number 52 on October 15, 2016, becoming his first top 100 single there. Meanwhile, in New Zealand the song debuted at number 31 on the Official New Zealand Music Chart and three weeks later it peaked at number 10.

In the United Kingdom, the song debuted and peaked at number 150 on the UK Singles Chart. However, the song peaked at number 80 on the Irish Singles Chart.

== Track listing ==
- Digital download

No.	Title	Length
1.	"You & Me" (featuring G-Eazy)	3:38

== Credits and personnel ==
Credits adapted from Hung Medien.

Vocal credits

- Marc E. Bassy – lead vocals
- G-Eazy – featured artist

Technical credits

- Songwriting – Marc Griffin, Gerald Gillum, James Hau, Selena Sloan, Rami Dawod, Jacob Olofsson, William Mosgrove
- Production – Rami Dawod, Jacob Olofsson, William Mosgrove, Alex Hau

== Charts ==
=== Weekly charts ===
Chart (2016)	Peak position
Australia (ARIA)	52
Belgium (Ultratip Bubbling Under Flanders)	30
Belgium (Ultratip Bubbling Under Wallonia)	22
Canada Hot 100 (Billboard)	84
Czech Republic Airplay (ČNS IFPI)	94
Czech Republic Singles Digital (ČNS IFPI)	36
Germany (GfK)	91
Ireland (IRMA)	66
Netherlands (Single Top 100)	35
New Zealand (Recorded Music NZ)	10
Portugal (AFP)	55
Slovakia Singles Digital (ČNS IFPI)	34
Sweden (Sverigetopplistan)	43
Switzerland (Schweizer Hitparade)	61
UK Singles (OCC)	150
US Billboard Hot 100	58
US Pop Airplay (Billboard)	32
US Rhythmic Airplay (Billboard)	8

=== Year-end charts ===
Chart (2016)	Position
US Rhythmic (Billboard)	47

== Certifications ==
Region	Certification	Certified units/sales
New Zealand (RMNZ)	3× Platinum	90,000^{‡}
Sweden (GLF)	Platinum	40,000^{‡}
United States (RIAA)	Platinum	1,000,000^{‡}
^{‡} Sales+streaming figures based on certification alone.

== Radio and release history ==
Region	Date	Format	Label	Ref.
Various	May 6, 2016	Digital download	Republic	
United States	May 24, 2016	Rhythmic contemporary	Republic	
United States	June 28, 2016	Contemporary hit radio	Republic	
