= Davidior =

David Park
- Born: February 14, 1983 (age 43); Flushing, Queens, New York, U.S.
- Origin: Staten Island & Brooklyn, New York
- Genre: Hip hop
- Occupations: Composer, music producer, songwriter, audio engineer
- Years active: 2004–present

David Park, better known as Davidior, is an American record producer, audio engineer, musician, songwriter and singer. He was a protégé of Bram Tobey (of Sony Music Studios), 2004–2006. Park first worked in the Staten Island underground music scene in the early 2000s, providing beats, recording and mixing songs, tracks and mixtapes for local artists.

== Career ==
Park's first entry into the music scene was a showcase performance at the 1998 Korean Chusok Festival in Flushing Meadows–Corona Park. By 2003, Park began building a home studio to record and mix for a New York City client base.

Park interned at Sony Music Studios from 2004 to 2006 as a general audio assistant and assistant engineer for sessions, involving pre-room gear and atmosphere setup, according to the preferences of artists, producers or engineers. Park credits three assistant engineers at Sony Music Studios – Bram Tobey, Mike Tschupp and Tatsuya Sato – for their contribution in audio engineering and mentorship.

In 2004, he recorded for Jojo Pellegrino and met rapper Joe Parker, who would later become his business partner.

From 2005 to 2007, Park was a partner and studio manager of House of Tracks Studios, Staten Island. He served as producer and manager for Melanie Iglesias in 2005. In the same year, collaborated and produced for Ex-plicit linez of The Movement, Warner Music Korea.

From 2007 to 2009, he attended SAE Institute, mentored by Michael White.

Park's first record deal signing was with Cutting Records, Inc. dba Beat Cutterz, LLC, c. 2010. The one label-approved single, "Put Your Fist in the Air", looked promising, but due to creative differences Park had to cease future development.

From 2011 to 2016, with the support and partnership of Joe Parker, Park was able to re-launch his Port Richmond, Staten Island recording studio under the name Retro Rock Studios, later updated to Sci Fi Lyfe Entertainment. There, Park has recorded for Parker and developed aspiring artists Nova, Kris Cartel and P. Mason.

At the tail end of 2016, Park has released an independent, instrumental album, "Concrete Waves"

== Personal life ==
In 2007 & 2010, Park had gone to mission trips to Bolivia to assist with the communities in the 3rd world environments.

David Park is a practitioner and an enthusiast of Aggressive Inline Skating since its inception, 1994, and continues til this day.

In July 2018, Park announced his involvement in upcoming suspense drama movie Japanese Borscht. The film also features, Eric Spade Rivas and Michael Musto.

== Labels ==
- Sony Music Studios (c. 2004–2005)
- G-Unit Records (c. 2007–2008)
- Cutting Records / Beat Cutterz (c. 2010–2013)
- Dave Park Music Group (DPMG) (c. 2010–present)
- Sci Fi Lyfe (c. 2011–present)

== Discography ==
=== Albums ===
- "Concrete Waves" (2016)

=== Singles ===
- "Put Your Fist In The Air" (2010) (Beat Cutterz) (Cutting Records)

=== Mixtapes ===
- Been Famous (P.Luciano) (Joe Parker, rapper) (2005) (recording/production)
- The Pack: Product of My Environment (I Got That Product, Mixtape Vol.2) (Tyrone Briggs) (2005) (recording/production)
- The Pack: CSE (The Coldest Summer Ever, Mixtape Vol.3) (Tyrone Briggs) (Brucie B) (2006) (recording/production)
- SHA: $TILL $TAKKIN: "Get Ya Money Up" (2007) (recording/production)
- Warning Shots (2007) (Lil C ... ) (executive producer)
- Back 2 Basics (2008) Ex-plicit linez (executive producer)
- Da New Era (2009) (recording/production) (Jae Millie)
- FamTree (2013) (recording/mixing)
- Out of Focus 2 (2016) (Kris Cartel) (mixing/executive producer)
- Power of Friends (2016) (P. Mason) (executive producer/mixing: We Holding and NY State of Mind)

== Music videos ==
- 2009: "Father Forgive Me" (Kaos in the Flesh) (video production: HL Multimedia) (music production and cameo: David Park) (2009 Chicago International Hip Hop Film Festival)
- 2012: "Antidote" (Swedish House Mafia) (cameo: David Park)
- 2012: "Certified Dope" (Joe Parker) (cameo: David Park)
- 2013: "Selfish" (Official Music Video) (Lyra Jo) (cameo: David Park)
- 2016: "Don't Waste My Time" (cover/remix) (Kris Cartel ft TOO JIGG) (record producer: David Park)
- 2016: "F**k What They Say" (Nova x K.Y. The Maniacz) (cameo: David Park)

== Awards ==
- 2009: 8th Urban Mediamakers Film Festival – Best Music Video (nominee): "Forgive Me Father" by Heinz Stossier

== Sound Design ==
- 2008: "Albert Einstein College of Medicine" (promo video)
- 2008: "Nintendo" (BIG BANG MINI on Nintendo DS)
- 2013–2014: Sean and Such (web series) (associate producer: David Park)

== Filmography ==
- 2005: B Unique Freestyle Rolling Mixtape 2 (Aggressive Inline Skating) (Background Cameo)
- 2019: Japanese Borscht (Suspense Drama) (as Akio, Yakuza)
