= Foolish (Tyler James song) =

Single by Tyler James

from the album The Unlikely Lad
- Released: 7 March 2005
- Recorded: 2004
- Genre: Pop
- Length: 3:55
- Label: Island Records
- Songwriter(s): James, Blair Mackichan

Tyler James singles chronology
"Why Do I Do?" (2004)	"Foolish" (2005)	"Your Woman" (2005)

"Foolish" is a song by British singer–songwriter Tyler James. The song was originally given to Gareth Gates for his 2003 album Go Your Own Way. Tyler's version was released as the second single from his debut album studio album The Unlikely Lad (2005) in the United Kingdom on 7 March 2005. The song peaked to number 16 on the UK Singles Chart, his first Top 20 single in the UK.

== Track listings ==
Digital download

1. "Foolish" - 3:55
2. "Nothing" (Acoustic) - 3:26
3. "Foolish (With My Hands Held High)" ["Re-Dub" Remix] - 4:09

== Chart performance ==
Chart (2005)	Peak position
UK Singles (OCC)	16

== Release history ==
Region	Date	Format	Label
United Kingdom	7 March 2005	CD	Island Records
United Kingdom	12 April 2005	Digital download	Island Records
