= Dinah Jane 1 =

EP by Dinah Jane
- Released: April 19, 2019
- Genre: R&B
- Length: 10:05
- Label: Hitco
- Producer: J. R. Rotem; Mel & Mus; Neff-U

Dinah Jane chronology
Dinah Jane 1 (2019)	Juice County Vol. 1 (2024)

Singles from Dinah Jane 1
- 1. "Heard It All Before" Released: April 19, 2019

Dinah Jane 1 is the debut extended play (EP) by American singer Dinah Jane. The EP was released on April 19, 2019 through Hitco, accompanied by its lead single "Heard It All Before". Dinah Jane 1 follows the September 2018 release of Jane's debut solo single "Bottled Up", featuring Ty Dolla Sign and Marc E. Bassy.

== Background and release ==
On March 28, 2019, Jane released the cover art for Dinah Jane 1 via social media, writing alongside it "4/19", referring to the date of the extended play's release. In the week prior to the EP's release, Jane began teasing the songs via social media by releasing snippets of audio for fans to listen to. Jane released audio versions of each track to YouTube, each of which doubled as lyric videos. A music video for lead single "Heard It All Before" was also released.

== Critical reception ==
Nylon named it one of the best musical releases of the week, remarking that Jane has "finally found her sound". Billboard called the songs "wildly catchy" and "old-school R&B with 2019 club-ready treatment". Mike Neid of Idolator called the EP a "fitting introduction to the pop star's inner thoughts".

== Track listing ==
No.	Title	Writer(s)	Producer(s)	Length
1.	"Heard It All Before"	Dinah Jane; Micah Powell; J. R. Rotem; Frank Brim	J. R. Rotem	3:21
2.	"Pass Me By"	Jocelyn Donald; Melvin Hough II; Rivelino Raoul Wouter	Mel & Mus	3:22
3.	"Fix It"	Dinah Jane; Theron Otis Feemster; Hayley Gene	Neff-U	3:22
Total length:				10:05
