= Monopole (album) =

Studio album by White Town
- Released: 13 October 2011
- Genre: Alternative rock; electronic
- Length: 31:05
- Label: Bzangy
- Producer: Jyoti Mishra

White Town chronology
Don't Mention The War (2006)	Monopole (2011)	The Barren Seas (2015)

White Town studio album chronology
Don't Mention The War (2006)	Monopole (2011)	Deemab (2019)

Singles from Monopole
- 1. "Cut Out My Heart" Released: 2010

Professional ratings
Review scores
Source	Rating
Whisper In And Holler In	7/10 stars

Monopole is the fifth studio album by British indie pop musical project White Town, released in 2011 through Bzangy Records.

== Track listing ==
All tracks are written by Jyoti Mishra.

No.	Title	Length
1.	"Cut Out My Heart"	2:52
2.	"She's a Lot Like You"	2:34
3.	"Till I Die"	3:02
4.	"I Don't Want to Fall In Love Again"	2:48
5.	"Have I Gone Too Far?"	3:37
6.	"Theme for Turku Central Station"	2:14
7.	"Invisible Elastic"	3:47
8.	"You Fill Me Up"	2:54
9.	"How Love Feels"	2:37
10.	"Missing Her Again"	3:18
11.	"Anywhere But Here"	1:22
