= Some Kind of Drug =

2015 song by G-Eazy featuring Marc E. Bassy

Single by G-Eazy featuring Marc E. Bassy

from the album When It's Dark Out
- Released: November 16, 2016
- Genre: Hip hop
- Length: 3:42
- Label: BPG; RVG; RCA
- Songwriters: Gerald Gillum; Christoph Andersson; Marc Griffin; Kevin White; Mike Woods
- Producers: Rice N' Peas; Andersson; G-Eazy

G-Eazy singles chronology
"Over Again" (2016)	"Some Kind of Drug" (2016)	"Still Feelin' It (Remix)" (2016)

Marc E. Bassy singles chronology
"You & Me" (2016)	"Some Kind of Drug" (2016)	"Cherry on Top" (2016)

Music video
- "Some Kind of Drug" on YouTube

"Some Kind of Drug" is a song by American rapper G-Eazy and the fourth single from his fourth studio album When It's Dark Out (2015). Featuring American singer Marc E. Bassy, it was produced by Rice N' Peas with additional production from Christoph Andersson and G-Eazy himself.

== Composition and lyrics ==
The song starts with Marc E. Bassy singing about a sexual encounter that left him intoxicated in the first verse, before proceeding to the hook. It also finds G-Eazy reminiscing on the women he has met and memories of their sexual relations ("Ever since I met you, you got me changing my schedule / If you ain't know, that shit's eventful / And losing this money is dreadful, but / Believe me, that pussy is special".

== Music video ==
The music video was released on November 16, 2016. Directed by Tobias Nathan, it sees G-Eazy having sex with at least five different women and also roaming the halls of a mansion.

== Remixes ==
The song has been remixed by producers Earwulf and Lincoln Jesser.

== Charts ==
Chart (2017)	Peak position
US Billboard Hot 100	97
US Hot R&B/Hip-Hop Songs (Billboard)	36

== Certifications ==
Region	Certification	Certified units/sales
New Zealand (RMNZ)	Platinum	30,000^{‡}
United States (RIAA)	Platinum	1,000,000^{‡}
^{‡} Sales+streaming figures based on certification alone.
