= 2AM Club =

American band

- Origin: Los Angeles, California, United States
- Genres: Alternative pop, pop rock, rap rock, funk rock, R&B
- Years active: 2007–2015 (hiatus)
- Label: RCA Records
- Members: Marc E. Bassy; Tyler Cordy; Matt Reagan; Dave Dalton; Matt Warshauer; Patrick Jarrett
- Past members: Ian O'Neill
- Website: www.2amclubmusic.com

2AM Club is an American band consisting of vocalists Marc E. Bassy and Tyler Cordy, guitarist Matt Reagan, keyboard player Dave Dalton, and bassist 'Sauce' Matt Warshauer. Ex- drummer Ian O'Neill left the band in June 2011 for "new opportunities" as a drummer for Gavin Degraw. As of late 2012 Patrick Jarrett, professional drummer, has been touring and playing venues with the band. The band came together in Los Angeles in 2007, after Tyler and Dave, who are childhood friends, and Marc and Reagan, who are also childhood friends, met Sauce and later Ian 2AM Club brings a diverse array of genres, including hip-hop, rock, electro, rap, and alternative. The group was named after their favorite bar, the 2 AM Club in Mill Valley, California. They signed with RCA Records, a division of Sony Music Entertainment in September 2008. The band announced an indefinite hiatus on June 29, 2015.

== History ==
The band performed for local colleges, travelling up and down the coast playing gigs. They created a buzz in California by hosting regular shows at parties and played a now-legendary four month residency they called 'Tiny Porno' at the Derby in Los Angeles, and word quickly spread that it was the place to be. Multiple label executives became aware of the band and came to see them perform live. Soon after, the band recorded some demos with Jerry Harrison, a former member of Talking Heads and Modern Lovers. After various meetings with labels the group chose to sign with RCA Records. Shortly after being signed, the group moved out to New York City to write and create their music.

=== 2010-2012 ===
'What Did You Think Was Going to Happen?' was the band's debut album, which released on September 14, 2010. It includes 11 tracks, and 1 bonus track named, 'Baseline' which is available specifically through iTunes download. The album features many of the songs the band performed live in front of their very first fans, in particular 'Nobody's in Love' 'Flashing Room' and what went on to be their first single, 'Worry About You' The album reached the number 4 spot on the 'Top 50 Heatseeker Albums' of 2010, and number 138 on the 'U.S. Billboard 200' chart. The song 'Faster Babe' from the album was featured in the soundtrack of the video game MLB 2K13. Matt Collar of Allmusic stated that with this album '2AM Club reveal themselves as the best and brightest of the nu-eyed-soul set'. Allmusic also reviewed the album 4/5 stars.

Earlier, in July 2010 the band played a cameo role as the school's band during the 'Pretty Little Liars' episode 'There's No Place Like Homecoming', performing their songs 'Worry About You' and 'Make You Mine', 'Let Me Down Easy' and 'Same Night Sky'. At the beginning of the next episode, 'The Homecoming Hangover', the band performed 'Faster Babe'.

After the release of their debut album, the band continued touring the states and building a strong group of fans. Several other artists joined them on the road including, Chiddy Bang and Xaphoon Jones, Mike Posner, Bad Rabbits, and Far East Movement.

On June 22, 2011 the band released a cover of If It Isn't Love by New Edition on their official YouTube page. More songs were uploaded onto the channel throughout the summer which available free to download for fans through their website and tumblr page.

The band had planned to release their new single 'Mary' featuring Dev and Big Sean on September 18, 2012, however it was leaked online a few weeks prior to the date. After the official release, the single began to pick up on the radio throughout the California area. It also became a regular on many radio stations in New Zealand and Indonesia.

=== 2012-2015 ===
The first single, 'Too F****d Up To Call' from the band's 2013 mixtape 'Clinton Sparks Presents 2AM Club in Moon Tower' was released on iTunes on the January 22, 2013. The music video, directed and produced by Sandy Kim, was released through VEVO and YouTube on January 10, 2013. Fans were encouraged to send in photos of things that inspire them and show their personality, these were then put together on the band website as a compilation of fan art for the single.

On November 5, 2013, the single 'Evidence' was released on iTunes, followed by an accompanying music video released on December 10, 2013. This was immediately followed with the release of another single titled 'I See Stars', released on iTunes on December 13, 2013. Unlike previous singles released by the band, 'I See Stars' received no promotion or announcement leading up to its surprise release.

On June 29, 2015, 2AM Club announced their hiatus to pursue other interests. Frontman Marc Griffin (now known as Marc E. Bassy), is the most successful in the group working with Ty Dolla $ign, Iamsu!, French Montana, and others.

=== 2022 ===
On June 27, 2022, 2AM Club announced on Twitter the upcoming release of the song 'California'. The single 'California' was released on July 22, 2022. On August 26, 2022, the single 'Love Notes' (originally released on Sound Cloud in 2013) was officially released as a single. On June 30, 2023, they released another single named “Taxi”.

== Discography ==
=== Albums ===
- What Did You Think Was Going to Happen? (2010)

=== Mixtapes ===
- Moon Tower (2013)

=== Singles ===
Year	Single	Album
2010	"Worry About You"	What Did You Think; Was Going to Happen?
2010	"Nobody's in Love"	What Did You Think; Was Going to Happen?
2011	"Let Me Down Easy"	What Did You Think; Was Going to Happen?
2011	"Make You Mine"	What Did You Think; Was Going to Happen?
2011	"Reach Down Deep"	Non-album single
2011	"Every Evening"	Moon Tower
2012	"Mary" (featuring Big Sean and Dev)	Moon Tower
2013	"Too F****d Up to Call"	Moon Tower
2013	"Not Your Boyfriend"	Non-album singles
2013	"Evidence"	Non-album singles
2013	"I See Stars"	Non-album singles
2022	"California"	Non-album singles
2022	"Love Notes"	Non-album singles
2023	"Taxi"	Non-album singles

=== Music videos ===
Year	Title
2010	"Worry About You"
2010	"Let Me Down Easy"
2013	"Too F****d Up to Call"
2013	"Evidence"

== Band members ==
- Marc E. Bassy - Lead Vocalist (2007–present)
- Tyler Cordy - Emcee (2007–present)
- Matt Reagan - Guitarist (2007–present)
- Dave Dalton - Keyboardist (2007–present)
- Ian O'Neill - Drummer (2007–2011)
- Patrick Jarrett - Drummer (2012–present)
- Matt "Sauce" Warshauer - Bassist (2007–present)

== See also ==
- Marc Griffin
