= Women in Technology (album) =

Studio album by White Town
- Released: 24 February 1997
- Genres: Alternative dance; electronic
- Length: 47:18
- Labels: Chrysalis; EMI
- Producer: Jyoti Mishra

White Town chronology
>Abort, Retry, Fail?_ (1996)	Women in Technology (1997)	Peek & Poke (2000)

White Town studio album chronology
Socialism, Sexism & Sexuality (1994)	Women in Technology (1997)	Peek & Poke (2000)

Singles from Women in Technology
- 1. "Your Woman" Released: 13 January 1997; 2. "Wanted" Released: 24 March 1997; 3. "Undressed" Released: May 1997

Professional ratings
Review scores
Source	Rating
AllMusic	4.5/5 stars
Music Week	3/5 stars
NME	4/10
Pitchfork	7.2/10
Smash Hits	4/5 stars

Women in Technology is the second studio album by British recording artist White Town, released on 24 February 1997. The album is most known for the song "Your Woman" which was its only top 40 single. The song received much acclaim and reached #1 in the UK Singles Chart. A second single, released as a promo, was made of "Wanted" and failed to chart anywhere. The album's third single "Undressed" reached 57. The album was recorded entirely at Jyoti Mishra's home studio.

== Background ==
In early 1997, Jyoti Mishra posted five copies of his extended play >Abort, Retry, Fail? to various radio stations. This caused the EP's lead track "Your Woman" to receive heavy rotation on stations, resulting in Mishra getting a deal with EMI. Through Chrysalis Records, a label owned by EMI, Mishra released the second White Town full-length Women In Technology, which produced three singles: the widely successful "Your Woman", the promo-only "Wanted", and "Undressed". The album was recorded and mixed to cassette tape using a Tascam 688 multitrack recorder and an Atari ST.

== Reception ==
=== Commercial ===
On the Billboard Heatseekers Album Chart dated March 15, 1997, Women in Technology debuted at number six. The album eventually reached the top 100 of the Billboard 200, thereby becoming ineligible for the Heatseekers chart, and ultimately peaked at number 84 on the Billboard 200 chart dated May 17, 1997.

== Track listing ==
All tracks are written by Jyoti Mishra, except where noted.

Women in Technology track listing
No.	Title	Writer(s)	Length
1.	"Undressed"		4:19
2.	"Thursday at the Blue Note"		2:48
3.	"A Week Next June"		4:18
4.	"Your Woman"	Mishra; Bing Crosby; Irving Wallman; Max Wartell	4:18
5.	"White Town"		2:24
6.	"The Shape of Love"		5:21
7.	"Wanted"	Mishra; Ann Pearson	4:24
8.	"The Function of the Orgasm"		2:29
9.	"Going Nowhere Somehow"		5:22
10.	"Theme for an Early Evening American Sitcom"		2:17
11.	"The Death of My Desire"		4:54
12.	"Once I Flew"		4:24
Total length:			47:18

Japanese bonus track
No.	Title	Length
13.	"Give Me Some Pain"	4:23
Total length:		52:41

== Personnel ==
- Jyoti Mishra – production, vocals, samples; Emax II on "Your Woman"
- Ann Pearson – vocals on "Thursday at the Blue Note", "Wanted", and "Once I Flew"
- Robert Fleay – guitar on "Undressed", "A Week Next June", Going Nowhere Somehow", and "Once I Flew"

== Charts ==
Chart performance for Women in Technology
Chart (1997)	Peak position
Canada Top Albums/CDs (RPM)	33
UK Albums (Official Charts)	83
US Billboard 200	84
