= A Place I Go =

Studio album by Tyler James
- Released: 29 October 2012
- Recorded: 2012
- Genre: Pop, PBR&B, soul
- Length: 50:08
- Label: Island
- Producer: will.i.am, Fraser T Smith, Guy Chambers, N.A.D

Tyler James chronology
| The Unlikely Lad (2005) | A Place I Go (2012) |

Singles from A Place I Go
- 1. "Single Tear" Released: 21 October 2012; 2. "Worry About You" Released: 17 February 2013

A Place I Go is the second studio album from Tyler James, released on 29 October 2012. The album serves as a follow-up to the debut album, The Unlikely Lad and marks James' second full-length release with Island Records.

The release of A Place I Go was preceded by the single "Single Tear" on 21 October 2012. The album also contains James' version of Steve Winwood's "Higher Love", which was performed live by James on The Voice UK and also featured on the show's compilation album. The album received mixed reviews, and peaked at number 47 on the UK Albums Chart the week of its release.

== Background ==
James confirmed in an interview with Digital Spy that he had written the album with Fraser T Smith and Guy Chambers. On his collaborations, he expressed "Working with Fraser T Smith is wicked. He's someone I've wanted to work with for a long time. I have so much respect for the craft of songwriting, so working with people like Fraser and Guy Chambers, there's so much I can learn from them."

James' mentor on The Voice UK, will.i.am has overseen the project. James stated "...the thing with will is that he's more overseeing my album. I'll send him tracks and he'll let me know what he thinks. I went for The Voice and didn't really think about it, to be honest. It wasn't a massive decision I made. Usually I wouldn't go for something like that because I'd be too scared. The chances of it f**king up are so great, so now when I look back at getting to the final I'm like, 'That was f**king lucky'. I hadn't really done much for four years leading up to that and that part of my life was quite sad and dramatic. So all of these songs coming out now reflects that. There is a part of my brain that's saying, 'Ooh, you better write something a bit more uptempo and happy'. But ultimately, if that's where your head's at, that's what you've got to do."

== Critical reception ==
The album received mixed reviews, with Virgin Media awarding the album 3 out of 5 stars, saying "the album suffers from over-earnestness and a samey pace" but is "an interesting real-deal of a debut", and Digital Spy giving the album 2 out of 5 stars, calling the album a "sluggish set which sadly falls short of expectations".

== Track listing ==
| No. | Title | Length |
|---|---|---|
| 1. | "Single Tear" | 4:06 |
| 2. | "Same Old Song" | 2:59 |
| 3. | "Worry About You (featuring Kano)" | 3:01 |
| 4. | "No Comedown" | 3:33 |
| 5. | "Prisoner in the Rain" | 3:24 |
| 6. | "Friendly Fire" | 3:33 |
| 7. | "Heart Shaped Hole" | 4:03 |
| 8. | "Just for Always" | 3:51 |
| 9. | "Baby Don't Care" | 3:32 |
| 10. | "Hand of Cards" | 2:59 |
| 11. | "Written in Stone" | 3:09 |
| 12. | "Brave" | 3:51 |
| 13. | "Higher Love" | 3:45 |
| 14. | "I Don't Give a Damn" | 4:25 |
| Total length: | | 50:08 |

Deluxe edition
| No. | Title | Length |
|---|---|---|
| 15. | "Single Tear" (SBTV Version) | 4:25 |
| 16. | "Would I Lie to You?" | 4:02 |
| 17. | "My Time (Acoustic Version)" | 2:57 |
| 18. | "Sign Your Name" | 3:33 |

== Release history ==
| Country | Release date | Format | Label |
|---|---|---|---|
| United Kingdom | 29 October 2012 | CD, digital download | Island Records |

== Charts ==
| Chart (2012) | Peak position |
|---|---|
| UK Albums Chart | 47 |
