= Single Tear =

Single by Tyler James

from the album A Place I Go
- Released: 13 October 2012
- Recorded: 2012
- Genre: Pop
- Length: 4:03
- Label: Island
- Songwriter(s): Guy Chambers, Tyler James

Tyler James singles chronology
"Your Woman" (2005)	"Single Tear" (2012)	"Worry About You" (2013)

"Single Tear" is a song by British singer-songwriter Tyler James, released as the lead single from his second studio album A Place I Go. The track was released as a digital download in the United Kingdom on 13 October 2012 and peaked to number 28 on the UK Singles Chart.

== Background ==
"Single Tear" was produced by Electric, part of the Stargate production duo. James commented of the song: "It came out of nowhere. It's an emotional song. I think I've poured the last year into it, it's the culmination of the most intense, life-changing year of my life. I learnt falsetto from Maxwell, I love Lauryn Hill and Otis Redding, people who sing with soul. That's not about doing a million riffs - when they sing, I believe them."

== Music video ==
A music video to accompany the release of "Single Tear" was first released onto YouTube on 5 September 2012. Tyler is seen kissing two women in a limo.

== Critical reception ==
Lewis Corner of Digital Spy gave the song a positive review stating:

"Haven't cried a single tear all year/ Gotta confess though, feels like disaster," he admits over crashing drums and cinematic strings that place him somewhere between Justin Timberlake and Hurts. It's a hefty comparison we know, but one that is justified by his knack for an epic chorus and his impressive falsetto. We suspect that if Tyler's going to be doing any weeping this winter, it should be out of joy for having a sterling comeback that deserves to be the success he never had first time out.

== Track listings ==
Digital download
No.	Title	Length
1.	"Single Tear"	4:03
2.	"Single Tear" (S-X Remix) (featuring Dot Rotten)	3:52
3.	"Single Tear" (High Rankin Remix)	4:23
4.	"Single Tear" (Popkong Remix)	3:32

== Chart performance ==
Chart (2012)	Peak position
UK Singles (OCC)	28

== Release history ==
Region	Date	Format	Label
United Kingdom	13 October 2012	Digital download	Island Records
