= Mireille Hildebrandt =

Dutch lawyer and philosopher

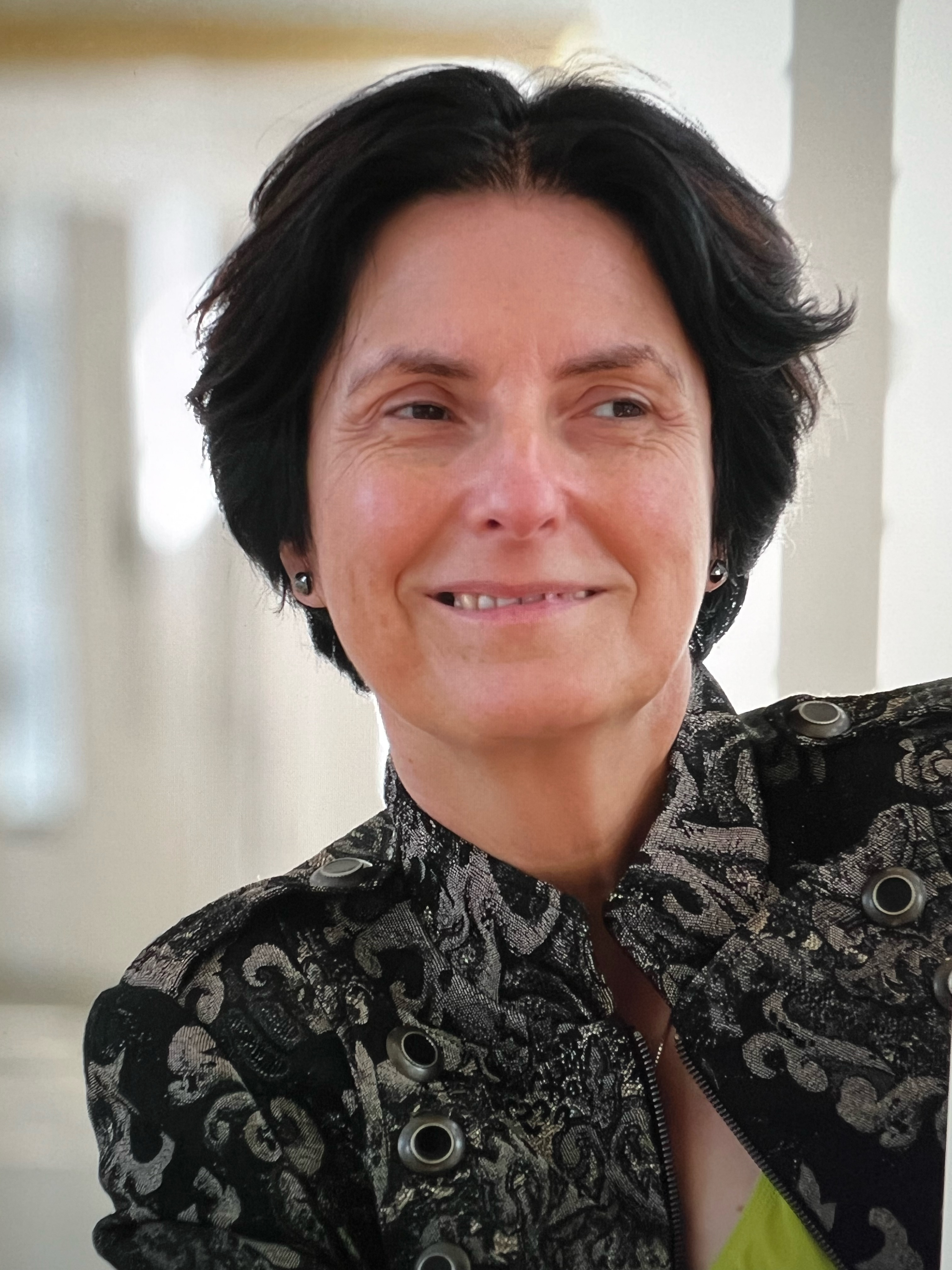
Mireille Hildebrandt

Mireille Hildebrandt (born 1958) is a Dutch lawyer and philosopher who works at the intersection of law and computer science. She is the Research Professor on 'Interfacing Law and Technology' at the Vrije Universiteit Brussel and holds the Chair of Smart Environments, Data Protection and the Rule of Law at the Institute for Computing and Information Sciences (iCIS) at Radboud University Nijmegen.

She is also the principal investigator of the 'Counting as a Human Being in the Era of Computational Law' project that runs from 2019–2024 and is funded by the European Research Council. The research targets two forms of computational law: machine learning and blockchain technology.

She has published four scientific monographs, 21 edited volumes or special issues, and over 100 chapters and articles in scientific journals and volumes. In 2015, she delivered the Chorley Lecture at the London School of Economics. In 2020, she was a General Co-Chair of the ACM FAccT Conference (formerly ACM FAT*). In 2022, she was elected a corresponding fellow of the British Academy.
