= Boom Boom (RedOne song) =

2017 single by RedOne

Single by RedOne, Daddy Yankee, French Montana and Dinah Jane
- Released: October 27, 2017
- Genre: EDM; hip house; reggaeton
- Length: 4:08
- Label: 2101
- Songwriters: Nadir Khayat; Ramón Ayala; Edwin Serrano; Timothy Thomas; Theron Makiel Thomas; Jakke Erixson; Yann Destagnol; Romain Tranchert; Bernard Edwards; Nile Rodgers
- Producers: RedOne; T.I. Jakke

RedOne singles chronology
"Voy a Bailar" (2017)	"Boom Boom" (2017)	"One World" (2018)

Daddy Yankee singles chronology
"Bella y Sensual" (2017)	"Boom Boom" (2017)	"Dura" (2018)

French Montana singles chronology
"No I Love Yous" (2017)	"Boom Boom" (2017)	"Dirty Sexy Money" (2017)

Dinah Jane singles chronology
"Boom Boom" (2017)	"Bottled Up" (2018)

Music video
- "Boom Boom" on YouTube

"Boom Boom" is a joint single by Moroccan artists RedOne and French Montana, Puerto Rican rapper Daddy Yankee, and American singer Dinah Jane. The track was written by Edwin Serrano, Yankee, R. City, and the producers RedOne and "T.I" Jakke Erixson, with Modjo, Bernard Edwards and Nile Rodgers receiving songwriting credits for the sampling of Modjo's "Lady (Hear Me Tonight)" (itself a reworking of Chic's "Soup for One"). The single was released digitally on October 27, 2017. An accompanying music video for the song was directed by Saïd C. Naciri and premiered through Daddy Yankee's YouTube account on October 26, 2017. It shows two friends traveling to various Moroccan cities and attending different parties while the first four artists perform the track. The song also marks Jane's first release outside of girl group Fifth Harmony.

== Background and composition ==
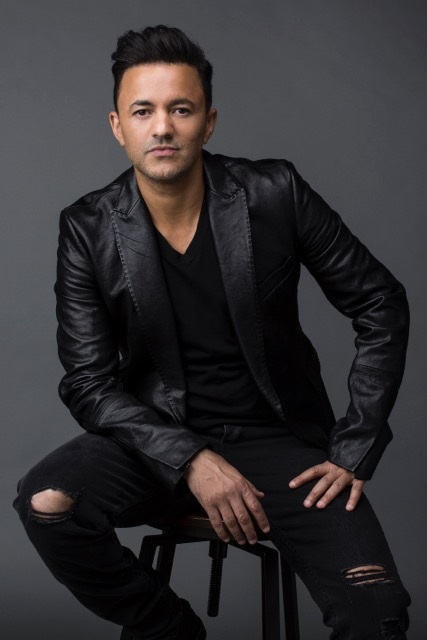
RedOne in 2017.

"Boom Boom" was written by Edwin Serrano, Daddy Yankee, R. City, and the producers RedOne and "T.I" Jakke Erixson, with Modjo, Bernard Edwards and Nile Rodgers receiving songwriting credits for the sampling of Modjo's "Lady (Hear Me Tonight)" (itself a reworking of Chic's "Soup for One"). The song was born after RedOne introduced French Montana to "Lady (Hear Me Tonight)" at his studio. Following Montana's positive reaction to it, claiming that "it'd be cool if [they] did something," RedOne recorded him during the next day. A few weeks later, he was with American group Fifth Harmony member Dinah Jane and showed her the track, receiving another very positive reaction to it, eventually recording her that same day. Dutch disc jockey and producer Tiësto also liked it, stating that he plays the original Modjo song "every weekend" and that it "is so perfect because [he] can replace it with something fresh." RedOne stated that "another artist" recorded too and then they filmed the music video in Morocco. Before the release of the song, he "had problems clearing the third artist" and decided to take a break.

While thinking about who could replace that artist, he decided to rework the track by making it "more global" and incorporating Latin influences. RedOne decided to reach Daddy Yankee, of whom he considers himself a fan, and sent him the track. They met at a recording studio in New York and came up with the title after telling Daddy Yankee that "he loves when he repeats words 'boom' and 'bam' in songs," deciding to change its original title "U Here Tonight". RedOne called the song "an explosion of positive energy the world needs at this time" and highlighted Daddy Yankee's collaboration. "Boom Boom" marked Dinah Jane's first song as soloist and the second RedOne track in which he performs apart from producing, the first one being "Don't You Need Somebody" (2016) featuring Enrique Iglesias, Rock City, Serayah and Shaggy.

The melody of the chorus was based on that of "Lady (Hear Me Tonight)" with altered lyrics, a similar case to another RedOne production, Jennifer Lopez's "On the Floor" (featuring Pitbull), sampling the melody of Kaoma's "Lambada". He also stated that he wanted to do something with Modjo's song since "the first time he heard it," being "Boom Boom" a "realization of that dream." Allison Stubblebine of Billboard mentioned a speculation about "Boom Boom" being a reworked version of an unreleased collaboration between RedOne, French Montana, Dinah Jane, and Fetty Wap titled "U Here Tonight", which was announced in February 2017.

"Boom Boom" has been described as a fusion between EDM, and hip house with a reggaeton beat and "a lush Latin melody." It was released on digital stores and streaming platforms on October 27, 2017.

== Critical reception ==
Raisa Bruner of Time magazine described the song as "an eclectic, upbeat mix" and "a truly global, Latin-tinged dance hit backed by their collective star power [...] and one that's guaranteed to get you dancing."

== Music video ==
=== Background ===
The music video for "Boom Boom" was directed by Moroccan director and producer Saïd C. Naciri and stars American Internet personality Amanda Cerny and Moroccan stylist and model Abla Essofi. A music video of a previous unreleased version of the song filmed in Morocco was shown to Daddy Yankee, who replied that they needed to travel to that country and rework the video. The filming took place in Los Angeles and various Moroccan cities, including Marrakesh, Chefchaouen, Tétouan, Merzouga, the Moroccan Sahara, and Cabo Negro. The reworked scenes featuring Daddy Yankee were filmed in September 2017 during a four-day period. Moroccan model Meryam Errachdy, who also took part in the clip, stated that "the aim of the [video] is to show the beauty of different cities in Morocco." The visual premiered through Daddy Yankee's YouTube account on October 26, 2017.

=== Synopsis ===
The video starts with two friends, portrayed by Amanda Cerny and Abla Essofi, finding two bracelets inside a carriage in front of a university in Los Angeles, which makes them capable of teleporting themselves anywhere in the world. They are teleported to Marrakesh in front of a big entrance, which opens instantly after their arrive and reveals RedOne standing behind the doors. He performs the first line of the chorus and the song begins to play, showing various shots of people dancing in a party during daytime. In the next scene, the girls teleport to Chefchaouen, where Daddy Yankee is performing his verse in an alley, meanwhile they are shown standing above a moving car after using their bracelets again. The vehicle suddenly stops and throws the girls in the air, who quickly teleport to a beach party in Cabo Negro while RedOne begins to sing the chorus for the first time. They use their bracelets again and appear in the streets of Tétouan, where French Montana performs his verse accompanied by RedOne and Dinah Jane in a roof. Meanwhile, the girls see a group of horsemen wearing blue clothes approaching them and teleport themselves to the Royal Mansour Marrakech hotel, in which RedOne is shown singing at the entrance. They took part of a party inside the hotel, where people are dancing to the track.

While Daddy Yankee sings the hook in the Royal Mansour, the girls look up and see various ballons in the sky, subsequently teleporting to one of them. Immediately, Dinah Jane begins to perform her verse in a nearby ballon while Daddy Yankee and RedOne are in the Moroccan Sahara riding buggies. After Jane's verse ends, RedOne and Daddy Yankee perform the chorus and the hook, respectively, while standing in front of a wood fire during a night party in Merzouga. When the song ends, the girls are unwittingly teleported back to Los Angeles, wearing the dresses as during the hotel party. A teacher surprises them and says that they must go back to their class or otherwise they would fail. After asking them why they are wearing those clothes, the girls look at each other and use their bracelets one more time. The video ends with various landscape shots of the Moroccan cities showed during the clip and the music starts playing again, ending with a shot of the Moroccan Sahara fading away after Daddy Yankee sings the hook twice.

== Credits and personnel ==
Credits adapted from Tidal.

- Yann Destagnol – songwriting
- Bernard Edwards – songwriting
- Jakke Erixson – songwriting
- Dinah Jane – vocals
- French Montana – vocals
- RedOne – songwriting, vocals, producer
- Nile Rodgers – songwriting
- Edwin Serrano – songwriting
- Theron Makiel Thomas – songwriting
- Romain Tranchert – songwriting
- Timothy Thomas – songwriting
- Daddy Yankee – songwriting, vocals

== Charts ==
=== Weekly charts ===
Chart (2017–18)	Peak position
Chile Anglo (Monitor Latino)	1
Colombia (National-Report)	86
Dominican Republic Anglo (Monitor Latino)	15
Ecuador Anglo (Monitor Latino)	2
France Downloads (SNEP)	166
Guatemala Anglo (Monitor Latino)	3
Mexico (Billboard Mexican Airplay)	30
Poland Airplay (ZPAV)	49
Spain (Promusicae)	33
Switzerland (Schweizer Hitparade)	90
US Digital Song Sales (Billboard)	50
US Hot Latin Songs (Billboard)	24
US Anglo (Monitor Latino)	16
Venezuela (National-Report)	87

=== Year-end charts ===
Chart (2017)	Position
Honduras (Monitor Latino)	88
Nicaragua (Monitor Latino)	86
Venezuela (Monitor Latino)	95
