= What Did You Think Was Going to Happen? =

Studio album by 2AM Club
- Released: September 14, 2010
- Recorded: 2008–2009
- Genre: Rock, pop
- Length: 40:11
- Label: RCA Records,
- Producer: 2AM Club

2AM Club chronology
What Did You Think; Was Going to Happen? (2010)	Moon Tower (2013)

Singles from What Did You Think Was Going to Happen?
- 1. "Worry About You" Released: 2010; 2. "Nobody's in Love" Released: 2010; 3. "Let Me Down Easy" Released: 2011; 4. "Make You Mine" Released: 2011

What Did You Think Was Going to Happen? is the debut studio album from Los Angeles band 2AM Club. It was released September 14, 2010 by RCA Records.

== Critical reception ==
Professional ratings
Review scores
Source	Rating
AllMusic	4/5 stars

Matt Collar of AllMusic stated that with this album "2AM Club reveal themselves as the best and brightest of the nu-eyed-soul set".

== Track listing ==
All tracks are written by 2AM Club.

No.	Title	Length
1.	"Flashing Room"	3:46
2.	"Only for Me"	3:24
3.	"Worry About You"	3:11
4.	"Faster Babe"	2:55
5.	"Dearly Departed"	3:22
6.	"Nobody's In Love"	3:46
7.	"Let Me Down Easy"	3:38
8.	"Hurricane"	3:20
9.	"Same Night Sky"	3:56
10.	"Saturday Night"	4:13
11.	"Make You Mine"	3:38
Total length:		40:11

iTunes Preorder Bonus Track
No.	Title	Length
12.	"Baseline"	3:41
Total length:		43:52

On May 31, the band released a song named "Baseline" that was a bonus track on What Did You Think Was Going to Happen? (sold on iTunes). It was advertised by them via Twitter, and was available for free download through a file sharing website, Hulk Share.

== Charts ==
Chart (2010)	Peak Position
Top Heatseeker Albums	4
U.S. Billboard 200	138
