= Ex-plicit linez =

American rapper

EX-PLICIT LINEZ
- Also known as: EXP
- Born: Brandon Jermaine Yun; 30 January 1988 (age 38); Bronx, New York
- Genres: East Coast hip hop
- Occupations: Rapper, Radio personality
- Years active: 1996–Present
- Label: OTM Entertainment

Brandon Jermaine Yun, better known by his stage name EXP (pronounced "e-ex-pee"), formerly EX-PLICIT LINEZ, is an American rapper and former radio personality for New York Korean radio NYKR 1660 AM, a mutual protégé of Drunken Tiger and Lee Hyun Do a.k.a. D.O. EXP first appeared on the underground rap scene in The Bronx in the mid 1990s on a DJ Platinum's mixtape series, Hate in Da Blood. He is one of the first generation of Asian American rappers to be involved in the Hip-Hop scene along with Jamez, John "shogunna" Chee and Mountain Brothers. He is also known as one of the first Korean rappers to mix Korean and English words to rhyme in the song. He is of Korean descent.

Aside from releasing multiple mixtapes that gained heavy rotations in college radio stations and internet radios, EXP has gained notoriety for involvement in feuds with other Korean artists.

== Music career ==
He became a member of The Movement in 2001. In 2007 he released his first United States radio single, Like That, which was produced by former member of (DEUX), Lee Hyun Do a.k.a. D.O. The single received spins throughout Atlanta radio stations. In addition to his solo works, EXP made numerous guest appearances internationally throughout Japan, China, France and Philippine.

EXP's Supreme Hustle set a record for most downloaded Hip Hop album in Chinese music sites in 2005.

In 2007, prior to releasing his 7th album, Rebirth of YSJ, Yoo Seung-jun showed interest in working with EXP, whom expressed his interest in making music in China.

EXP was briefly signed to Tiger JK's Jungle Entertainment in 2008 and Warner Music Korea under D.O from Deux. In 2010, Lee Hyun Do a.k.a. D.O. announced that he was producing for EXP. He also worked with K-Pop producer Seung Wook Yang (Producer of Click-B's Oh Jong Hyuk and ezllife)

In December 2010, EXP became Urban A&R at S.M. Entertainment and Mnet (Korea) affiliate, MarCan Entertainment. He left the company due to mutual Differences.

EXP recorded an entrance song "Baki's Theme" for Korean MMA Fighter Won sik "Parky" Park for his bout against Kosuke Umeda. Park lost the bout via Unanimous Decision.

In 2014, EXP coached and prepared Sang A Yim-Propp for her performance on SBS Channel's Thanksgiving special show "Yul chang Club Some-Sing".

== The Movement ==
EXP is part of The Movement, which is a hip hop collective formed by Korean American hip hop group Drunken Tiger and Dynamic Duo/CB Mass.

- Drunken Tiger
- Dynamic Duo/CB Mass
- T
- Eun Ji Won
- Epik High
- Yang Dong-geun
- Leessang
- Bobby Kim
- Bizzy
- Sean2Slow
- Double K
- TBNY
- Ex-plicit Linez
- Dok2
- Roscoe Umali
- Mickey Eyez
- MNOVA
- Buga Kingz

== Personal life ==
In 2009, EXP supported and performed for Relay for Life (American Cancer Society) event in East Village, New York.

EXP is a fan of Mixed Martial Arts. He is a practitioner of Russian Martial Arts Sambo (martial art) and holds 5th Dan (Godan) Black belt in Aikido.

In July 2014, EXP announced his involvement in upcoming horror movie Vamp Bikers DOS. The movie also featured Melle Mel and Grandmaster Caz.

In October 2018, EXP announced his acting appearance in Amazon Original produced Japanese Borscht Remake with distribution by Sony. He also appears on the original soundtrack for the film.

In November 2020, EXP launched a clothing company, Thick Bad Wolf.

EXP also has hinted a return to the music scene from long hiatus.

== Discography ==
=== Albums ===
- a Promise and a Threat by Bando Korea (1997)
- Black Magic (Unreleased) by Warner Music (2011)
- Tredecim (1996–2009) Underground Hits Collection by OTM Records (2019)

=== Mixtapes ===
- Imperial Vol. 1 (2003)
- Black Suede Records Presents: Supreme Hustle (2005)
- Black Suede Records Presents: Supreme Hustle (Chinese Version) (2005)
- Back 2 Basics (2008)
- Back 2 Basics: 22k Edition (2009)

== Filmography ==
- 2006: Japanese borscht (Suspense Drama) (as Americanized Yakuza)
- 2009: Independent Director's Sorrow (Drama) (Cameo)
- 2013: 36 (Thriller) (as Sheldon Yi)
- 2014: Anemone (Drama) (Choreographer)
- 2015: Vamp Birkers DOS (Horror Action) (Action Choreographer)
- 2016: ZomBikers (Horror Action) (Action Choreographer)(Cameo)
- 2019: Japanese Borscht Remake (as Xioshi the Americanized Yakuza)
