= Worry About You (song) =

Single by Tyler James featuring Kano

from the album A Place I Go
- Released: 17 February 2013
- Recorded: 2012
- Genre: Pop
- Length: 3:37
- Label: Island Records
- Songwriter(s): Blair MacKichan, Tyler James

Tyler James singles chronology
"Single Tear" (2012)	"Worry About You" (2013)

Kano singles chronology
"Pow 2011" (2011)	"Worry About You" (2013)	"Forefather" (2013)

"Worry About You" is a song by British singer-songwriter Tyler James featuring vocals from English rapper Kano. The track was released as the second single from James' second studio album A Place I Go and peaked at number 38 on the UK Singles Chart.

== Music video ==
A music video to accompany the release of "Worry About You" was first released onto YouTube on 1 January 2013.

== Track listings ==
Digital download
No.	Title	Length
1.	"Worry About You" (feat. Kano)	3:37
2.	"Worry About You" (Mike Delinquent Remix)	4:43
3.	"Worry About You" (feat. Kano) (DJ Wonder Remix)	3:54
4.	"Worry About You" (Steve Smart & Westfunk Remix Club Edit)	4:40

== Chart performance ==
Chart (2013)	Peak position
UK Singles (OCC)	38

== Release history ==
Region	Date	Format	Label
United Kingdom	17 February 2013	Digital download	Island Records
