= The Unlikely Lad =

Studio album by Tyler James
- Released: 29 August 2005
- Recorded: 2003–2005
- Genre: Pop, soul
- Length: 50:51
- Label: Island Records
- Producer: Blair McKichan, Anders Kallmark, Jony Rockstar, Mushtaq, Jimmy Hogarth, Track & Field, Steve Lewinson, Pete Lewinson

Tyler James chronology
The Unlikely Lad (2005)	A Place I Go (2012)

Singles from The Unlikely Lad
- 1. "Why Do I Do?" Released: November 1, 2004; 2. "Foolish" Released: March 7, 2005; 3. "Your Woman" Released: August 22, 2005

The Unlikely Lad is the debut album from English singer Tyler James. It was released on 29 August 2005 as a digital download and was ineligible to chart on the UK Albums Chart (as chart rules at the time did not encompass download sales). Following James' participation in the first series of The Voice UK in 2012, the album reached a peak of 34 on the UK Album Downloads Chart, and was released on CD for the first time.

The album spawned three singles: "Why Do I Do?", "Foolish" and "Your Woman".

== Singles ==
- "Why Do I Do?" was released as the lead single on November 1, 2004. The single peaked at number 25 on the UK Singles Chart.
- "Foolish" was released as the second single on March 7, 2005. It peaked at number 16 on the same chart.
- "Your Woman" was released as the third single on August 22, 2005. It peaked at number 60.

== Track listing ==
No.	Title	Writer(s)	Producer(s)	Length
1.	"Intro - Rainy Days"	Matthew Marston	Matthew Marston	1:10
2.	"Why Do I Do?"	Tyler James, Blair MacKichan, Justin Gray	Blair MacKichan, Anders Kallmark	4:19
3.	"Your Woman"	Jytori Prakash Mishra, Bing Crosby, Irving Wallman, Max Wartel	Jony Rockstar	4:01
4.	"Foolish"	James, Blair Mackichan	Mushtaq	3:55
5.	"Long Day"	James, Amy Winehouse, Mick Lister	Mushtaq	4:28
6.	"Drunk All Night"	James, Jimmy Hogarth	Jimmy Hogarth, Mushtaq	3:43
7.	"Dead or Alive"	James, Track & Field	Track & Field	4:26
8.	"One Place Left to Go"	James, Track & Field	Track & Field	3:57
9.	"Gone Are the Days"	James, Track & Field	Track & Field	3:15
10.	"Procrastination"	Winehouse, James, Marston	Steve Lewinson, Pete Lewinson, Jony Rockstar	4:02
11.	"Speak Up"	James, Marston	Mushtaq	4:12
12.	"Best for Me" (with Amy Winehouse)	James, Winehouse	Mushtaq	5:15
13.	"Running Out"	James, Marston	Mushtaq	3:45
14.	"On My Own"	James, Anders Kallmark	Mushtaq	4:12

== Release history ==
Country	Release date	Format	Label
United Kingdom	29 August 2005	Digital download	Island Records
United Kingdom	2 July 2012	CD	Island Records

== Charts ==
Chart (2012)	Peak position
UK Album Downloads Chart (OCC)	34
