= Why Do I Do? =

Single by Tyler James

from the album The Unlikely Lad
- Released: 1 November 2004
- Recorded: 2003
- Genre: Pop
- Length: 3:43
- Label: Island Records
- Songwriter(s): Tyler James, Blair MacKichan, Justin Gray
- Producer(s): Blair MacKichan, Anders Kallmark

Tyler James singles chronology
"Wilder" (2001)	"Why Do I Do?" (2004)	"Foolish" (2005)

"Why Do I Do?" is the debut single by British singer-songwriter Tyler James, released as a digital download in the United Kingdom on 1 November 2004. The song is from his debut studio album The Unlikely Lad (2005). It peaked at number 25 on the UK Singles Chart.

== Track listings ==
Digital download
No.	Title	Length
1.	"Why Do I Do?" (Radio Edit)	3:43
2.	"My Time" (Mushtaq Version)	2:56
3.	"Why Do I Do?" (Grant Nelson Club Remix)	6:03
4.	"Why Do I Do?" (Ruff & Jam Remix)	7:09

== Chart performance ==
Chart (2004)	Peak position
UK Singles (OCC)	25

== Release history ==
Region	Date	Format	Label
United Kingdom	1 November 2004	Digital download	Island Records
United Kingdom	1 November 2004	CD	Island Records
