= Heard It All Before (Dinah Jane song) =

Single by Dinah Jane

from the EP Dinah Jane 1
- Released: April 19, 2019
- Genre: R&B
- Length: 3:21
- Label: Hitco
- Songwriter(s): Dinah Jane; Micah Powell; J. R. Rotem; Frank Brim
- Producer(s): J. R. Rotem

Dinah Jane singles chronology
"Bottled Up" (2018)	"Heard It All Before" (2019)	"Retrograde" (2019)

Music video
- "Heard It All Before" on YouTube

"Heard It All Before" is a song recorded by American singer Dinah Jane. It was released on April 19, 2019 as the lead single from Jane's debut solo EP Dinah Jane 1. The extended play was released on the same day as the song. It is a R&B song written by Jane, Micah Powell, J.R. Rotem and Frank Brim, and produced by J.R. Rotem. The single has peaked in the top 40 on Urban radio.

== Background and release ==
Jane released audio teasers of the song prior to the extended play's release, and announced it would be receiving a music video on the day of the single's release. Two videos have been released: the official music video and an audio version accompanied by lyrics.

== Music video ==
The video was released on April 19, 2019. It begins with Jane's friends having a sleepover with her and watching a movie. Her ex calls her on the phone, but Jane is not present, and her friends answer, saying that she doesn't need him. The song then starts, and Jane is seen dancing through the house with her friends in the bedroom, spliced with solo shots in front of a wall, and in some scenes she dances with a man strapped to a chair.

== Composition and critical reception ==
The song touches on "listening to the same old, same old". Billboard described the songs in the EP as "wildly catchy" and "old-school R&B with 2019 club-ready treatment".
