= Your Woman =

1997 single by White Town

- Plain slipcase with opening

Single by White Town

from the album Women in Technology
- B-side: "Give Me Some Pain"; "Theme for a Mid-Afternoon Game Show"; "Theme for a Late-Night Documentary About the Dangers of Drug Abuse"
- Released: 13 January 1997
- Genre: Alternative pop; funk; electropop; boom bap
- Length: 4:20
- Label: Chrysalis; Brilliant!; EMI
- Songwriters: Jyoti Mishra; Lew Stone
- Producer: White Town

White Town singles chronology
| "All She Said" (1991) | "Your Woman" (1997) | "Undressed" (1997) |

Audio sample
- "Your Woman": file; help

Music video
- "Your Woman" on YouTube

"Your Woman" is a song by British music producer White Town. It was released in 1996 on the US indie label Parasol Records as the lead track on the >Abort, Retry, Fail?_ EP, when it picked up play on BBC Radio One. This resulted in a major label re-release of the EP in January 1997 by Chrysalis, Brilliant! and EMI Records. It served as the lead single from his second album, Women in Technology (1997), and features a muted trumpet sample performed by Nat Gonella in the 1932 recording of "My Woman" by Lew Stone and his Monseigneur Band.

"Your Woman" peaked at No. 1 on the UK Singles Chart and also topped the charts of Iceland, Israel and Spain. It peaked within the top 10 of the charts in 12 other countries and reached No. 23 in the United States. With male vocals sung from a female perspective, it became the first gender-reversal song to top the UK chart. The song's music video was filmed in black and white silent film style. In the booklet of their 1999 album 69 Love Songs, the Magnetic Fields' frontman Stephin Merritt described "Your Woman" as one of his "favourite pop songs of the last few years." In 2010, the song was named the 158th best track of the 1990s by Pitchfork.

== Background and writing ==
Jyoti Prakash Mishra, White Town's sole member and the writer of "Your Woman", had garnered some notoriety within the United Kingdom's underground music scene in the years leading up to the song's mainstream release. In 1997, the song was heard by Mark Radcliffe (a BBC Radio 1 presenter at the time) who played it, helping Mishra gain much recognition in a short time.

Mishra has stated that the lyrics could stem from or be related to multiple situations. He says "When I wrote it, I was trying to write a pop song that had more than one perspective. Although it's written in the first person, the character behind that viewpoint isn't necessarily what the casual listener would expect".

Mishra wrote that the themes of the song include: "Being a member of an orthodox Trotskyist/Marxist movement. Being a straight guy in love with a lesbian. Being a gay guy in love with a straight man. Being a straight girl in love with a lying, two-timing, fake-arse Marxist. The hypocrisy that results when love and lust get mixed up with highbrow ideals." In particular, Mishra admitted that part of the inspiration for the song came from teenage infatuation with a girl that, unbeknownst to him, was a lesbian. Mishra admitted that being signed to a major label (EMI) did not allow him to express creative control, and the loss of his anonymity due to the song's popularity drove him "mad".

The '>Abort, Retry, Fail?_' message that appeared on some inlay cards was explained by the artist: "Well, this cheerful message became a kind of shibboleth for me and sort-of characterises what's been going on for me the last few years." The song was created using free MIDI sequencing software for the Atari ST and a cheap multitrack cassette tape recorder.

== Composition ==
J'na Jefferson of Billboard summarized the song's production as a juxtaposition of the sampled track's ("My Woman" by Lew Stone), "despondent sound with upbeat, enduring energy", which Mishra said was inspired by the 1970s BBC drama-comedy series Pennies From Heaven. He labeled it "alt-pop", adding that it combines the Bowlly sample with "George Clinton-style funk from the '70s, Depeche Mode-inspired '80s electro pop, and '90s boom-bap hip-hop."

The song's lyrics contain various perspectives about love and relationships, and is, according to Mishra, a "flip" of Lew Stone vocalist Al Bowlly's original "anti-woman" theme. Regarding the song's concept and the perspective of which it is sung from, Mishra said "When you love somebody, it's not logical, it's not rational, and you think, 'This is ridiculous, I can never be with you, I can never be the person you need, why am I even feeling these feelings?' So, I was trying to write from all these different sides… I wanted people to go, 'this is catchy,' and sing it, but then be like, 'What the hell?' at the same time".

== Critical reception ==
Larry Flick from Billboard magazine wrote that "the lines dividing electronic dance music and hip-hop are blurred on this instantly infectious ditty, actually, the real creative inspiration here appears to come from 'Good Times' and other classic hits by Chic. It's evident in the jangly guitar licks and the bounce of the backbeat." He added that "those with no historical reference will probably find the distorted vocals and mind-numbing horn samples good fun." Stuart Millar from The Guardian described the song as "a blend of indie-pop, with an introduction from a trumpet piece taken from a 1920s record."

A reviewer from Music Week gave it a full score of five out of five and named it Single of the Week, noting that it has already won Radio One support "and it's easy to see why. With a vocal reverberating somewhere between The Buggles and Stephen Duffy, this instantly catchy pop synth dance track is simplicity at its irresistible best." Dave Fawbert from ShortList said, "It's one of those classic, not-quite-sure-why-it-works-but-it-definitely-does tunes, so lo-fi that the song was actually mixed [sic] on an Atari ST." Gina Morris from Smash Hits commented that "what's cool is that he recorded his debut single in his own room and then watched it go to number one."

== Music video ==
The accompanying music video for "Your Woman" was produced in the style of a black-and-white silent film. Most of the outdoor scenes were filmed in Derby. It was directed by Mark Adcock and filmed using a 16 mm Bolex camera.

In the video, there are numerous elements of acting, cinematography and editing that suggest an old-fashioned film. The exaggerated gestures of Chloé Treend, the hat-wearing woman, helpless and fearful, and those of her quick-tempered lover hint at the acting style from 1920s expressionist films. The ostensive metaphors, such as the use of hypnosis on the woman by the man or the recurring shots of crossroad signs bearing names of romantic relationship related attitudes, remind of the 1920s and 1930s efforts to express subjectivism in film.

The use of circular masks, as to emphasise focal points or for a mere elegant look, also belongs to the aforementioned period. At the point where the woman first enters the man's bedroom and in the final rope scene, match cuts are used in a manner resemblant of that from silent experimental films. Mishra can be seen for brief moments on television screens in the background.

There is also a scene where the woman closes the door on the man's arm, as she tries to escape from his advances. This is a direct reference to scene from Salvador Dalí and Luis Buñuel's surrealist film Un chien andalou (1928).

== Abort, Retry, Fail?_ ==
>Abort, Retry, Fail?_

EP by White Town
- Released: 1996
- Length: 17:37
- Labels: Parasol, Chrysalis

White Town chronology
| Socialism, Sexism & Sexuality (1994) | >Abort, Retry, Fail?_ (1996) | Women in Technology (1997) |

White Town EP chronology
| Fairweather Friend (1992) | >Abort, Retry, Fail?_ (1996) | The Barren Seas (2015) |

The song was originally released as the lead track on a four-track single CD or EP called >Abort, Retry, Fail?_ on Parasol Records in mid-1996.

The title of the EP was taken from the MS-DOS error message "Abort, Retry, Fail?". This referred to the problems White Town's sole member, Jyoti Mishra, had when a computer crashed during the production of the track. Mishra's liner notes and associated blog post of the single explain this with "I got the title for this single from the weekend I mixed the tracks. My hard drive went bonkers and I spent 72 hours reformatting the dang thing".

The EP was sent to various national UK Radio DJs where it was quickly picked up for play by Mark Radcliffe on his late night BBC Radio 1 show. When Radcliffe stood in on the Radio 1 Breakfast Show a few weeks later, the song was aired to a much wider audience and quickly caught the attention of major labels, leading to its re-release in January 1997 by Chrysalis, Brilliant! and EMI Records. Mishra insisted that the full EP title, track listing and artwork be retained from the original release, with the title "Your Woman" being added in order to minimise confusion.

As an EP, it reached 40 in New Zealand.

== Influence and legacy ==
In the booklet of their 1999 album 69 Love Songs, The Magnetic Fields' frontman Stephin Merritt described "Your Woman" as one of his "favourite pop songs of the last few years." In 2004, Q magazine featured the song in their list of "The 1010 Songs You Must Own". In 2010, Pitchfork named it the 158th best track of the 1990s.

In 2011, Slant Magazine ranked it No. 72 in their list of "The 100 Best Singles of the 1990s", writing, "A one-hit wonder whose other material totally justifies that status, White Town stumbled into a moment of sheer brilliance on "Your Woman", a single that married a fucked-up horn sample to a funk rhythm section straight out of Prince's playbook. The sheer catchiness of the song's arrangement got some adventurous radio programmers on board, but it was the say-what-now gender politics of the song's lyrics that proved to be most compelling. Hearing Jyoti Mishra's plaintive tenor croon, I guess what they say is true/I could never be the right kind of girl for you/I could never be your woman, remains one of the most subversive moments in '90s pop." In 2017, Billboard ranked it No. 31 in their list of "The 100 Greatest Pop Songs of 1997".

== Track listings ==
- UK and Australian CD single
1. "Your Woman" – 4:18
2. "Give Me Some Pain" – 4:23
3. "Theme for a Mid-Afternoon Game Show" – 2:48
4. "Theme for a Late-Night Documentary About the Dangers of Drug Abuse" – 6:08
- UK cassette single and European CD single
1. "Your Woman" – 4:18
2. "Give Me Some Pain" – 4:23
- Italian 12-inch single

A1. "Your Woman" (The Fights 2000 mix)
B1. "Your Woman"
B2. "Give Me Some Pain"

- US CD and cassette single
1. "Your Woman" – 4:18
2. "Theme for a Late-Night Documentary About the Dangers of Drug Abuse" – 6:08
- The trumpet on "Your Woman" is sampled from "My Woman" by Lew Stone and the Monseigneur Band. Mishra discovered the song via the 1978 BBC television series Pennies From Heaven.

== Charts ==
=== Weekly charts ===
| Chart (1997) | Peak position |
|---|---|
| Australia (ARIA) | 2 |
| Austria (Ö3 Austria Top 40) | 23 |
| Belgium (Ultratop 50 Flanders) | 20 |
| Belgium (Ultratop 50 Wallonia) | 7 |
| Canada Top Singles (RPM) | 4 |
| Canada Adult Contemporary (RPM) | 22 |
| Canada Dance/Urban (RPM) | 5 |
| Canada Rock/Alternative (RPM) | 2 |
| Denmark (IFPI) | 4 |
| Europe (Eurochart Hot 100) | 11 |
| Finland (Suomen virallinen lista) | 4 |
| France (SNEP) | 5 |
| Germany (GfK) | 24 |
| Hungary (Mahasz) | 5 |
| Iceland (Íslenski Listinn Topp 40) | 1 |
| Ireland (IRMA) | 5 |
| Israel (Israeli Singles Chart) | 1 |
| Italy (Musica e dischi) | 3 |
| Italy Airplay (Music & Media) | 1 |
| Netherlands (Dutch Top 40) | 21 |
| Netherlands (Single Top 100) | 28 |
| New Zealand (Recorded Music NZ) | 5 |
| Norway (VG-lista) | 5 |
| Scottish Singles Sales (Official Charts) | 2 |
| Spain (AFYVE) | 1 |
| Sweden (Sverigetopplistan) | 10 |
| Switzerland (Schweizer Hitparade) | 19 |
| UK Singles (Official Charts) | 1 |
| US Billboard Hot 100 | 23 |
| US Adult Top 40 (Billboard) | 16 |
| US Dance Club Play (Billboard) | 26 |
| US Modern Rock Tracks (Billboard) | 5 |
| US Top 40/Mainstream (Billboard) | 5 |

=== Year-end charts ===
| Chart (1997) | Position |
|---|---|
| Australia (ARIA) | 35 |
| Belgium (Ultratop 50 Flanders) | 100 |
| Belgium (Ultratop 50 Wallonia) | 49 |
| Canada Top Singles (RPM) | 22 |
| Canada Rock/Alternative (RPM) | 19 |
| Europe (Eurochart Hot 100) | 34 |
| France (SNEP) | 53 |
| Iceland (Íslenski Listinn Topp 40) | 14 |
| Israel (Israeli Singles Chart) | 19 |
| New Zealand (RIANZ) | 40 |
| UK Singles (OCC) | 41 |
| US Billboard Hot 100 | 65 |
| US Modern Rock Tracks (Billboard) | 32 |
| US Top 40/Mainstream (Billboard) | 29 |

== Certifications ==
| Region | Certification | Certified units/sales |
|---|---|---|
| Australia (ARIA) | Platinum | 70,000^{^} |
| France (SNEP) | Gold | 250,000^{*} |
| New Zealand (RMNZ) | Gold | 5,000^{*} |
| United Kingdom (BPI) | Gold | 400,000^{‡} |
^{*} Sales figures based on certification alone.^{^} Shipments figures based on certification alone.^{‡} Sales+streaming figures based on certification alone.

== Release history ==
| Region | Date | Format(s) | Label(s) | Ref. |
|---|---|---|---|---|
| United Kingdom | 13 January 1997 | 12-inch vinyl; CD; cassette | Chrysalis; Brilliant! | |
| United States | 14 January 1997 | Modern rock radio | EMI; Brilliant! | |
| United States | 25 February 1997 | Rhythmic contemporary; contemporary hit radio | EMI; Brilliant! | |
| United States | 11 March 1997 | CD; cassette | EMI; Brilliant! | |
| Japan | 26 March 1997 | CD | Chrysalis | |

== Tyler James version ==
"Your Woman"

Single by Tyler James

from the album The Unlikely Lad
- Released: 22 August 2005
- Length: 3:45
- Label: Island
- Producer: Jony Rockstar

Tyler James singles chronology
| "Foolish" (2005) | "Your Woman" (2005) | "Single Tear" (2012) |

British singer songwriter Tyler James released a cover of the song. It was released as the third and final single from his debut studio album, The Unlikely Lad (2005). It was released as a digital download in the United Kingdom on 22 August 2005. The song peaked at No. 60 on the UK Singles Chart.

=== Track listings ===
Digital download
| No. | Title | Length |
|---|---|---|
| 1. | "Your Woman" | 3:45 |
| 2. | "Temptation" | 3:15 |

=== Charts ===
| Chart (2005) | Peak position |
|---|---|
| UK Singles (Official Charts) | 61 |

=== Release history ===
| Region | Date | Format(s) | Label(s) | Ref. |
|---|---|---|---|---|
| United Kingdom | 22 August 2005 | Digital download | Island | |
| United Kingdom | 22 August 2005 | CD | Island | |

== Princess Chelsea version ==
"Your Woman"

Single by Princess Chelsea
- Released: 6 February 2009
- Length: 4:39
- Label: Lil' Chief
- Producers: Chelsea Nikkel; Jonathan Bree

Princess Chelsea singles chronology
| "Your Woman" (2009) | "Monkey Eats Bananas" (2009) |

New Zealand musician Princess Chelsea released a cover of the song in 2009. It was released as her debut, non-album single through digital download.

== Other covers ==
- Finnish band Cats on Fire covered the song in 2010, on their album Dealing in Antiques.
- Australian indie rock band British India performed a version live on radio station Triple J's weekly segment Like a Version in October 2013.
- German electronic duo Kush Kush sampled the song in "Fight Back With Love Tonight" in 2017, which peaked at No. 1 on the Russian music charts on 23 October 2017.
- White Town released a new version of the song on its twentieth anniversary named "Your Woman 1917", which is recorded with instruments common in 1917.

== Sampling ==
- Polish hip hop duo Peel Motyff sampled the song in "Nie jest tak źle" in 2001, on their album Sieć.
- Naughty Boy, featuring Wiley and Emeli Sandé, sampled the song in "Never Be Your Woman" in 2010.

== See also ==
- 1997 in music
- 1997 in British music
- "Love Again" by Dua Lipa, which also sampled Lew Stone's original version of "My Woman".
