= Bottled Up =

2018 song by Dinah Jane

Single by Dinah Jane featuring Ty Dolla Sign and Marc E. Bassy
- Released: September 21, 2018
- Recorded: 2018
- Genre: R&B
- Length: 3:20
- Label: Hitco
- Songwriters: Alejandro Chal; Tyrone Griffin; Marc Griffin; Dinah Hansen
- Producers: James Hau; David Park; William Mosgrove; Nic Nac

Dinah Jane singles chronology
"Boom Boom" (2017)	"Bottled Up" (2018)	"Heard It All Before" (2019)

Ty Dolla Sign singles chronology
"Ain't My Girlfriend" (2018)	"Bottled Up" (2018)	"Nights Like This" (2019)

Marc E. Bassy singles chronology
"Cool" (2018)	"Bottled Up" (2018)	"Die Hard" (2019)

"Bottled Up" is the debut solo single by American singer Dinah Jane, featuring fellow American singers Ty Dolla Sign and Marc E. Bassy. It was written by A. Chal, Ty Dolla Sign, Bassy, and Jane. It was released on September 21, 2018. The song was noted for having a similar sound to Jane’s former group’s, Fifth Harmony, music. It is an R&B song with tropical and hip-hop influences, while lyrically, it is about someone who bottles up their feelings and uses alcohol and drugs to hide them.

== Background and release ==
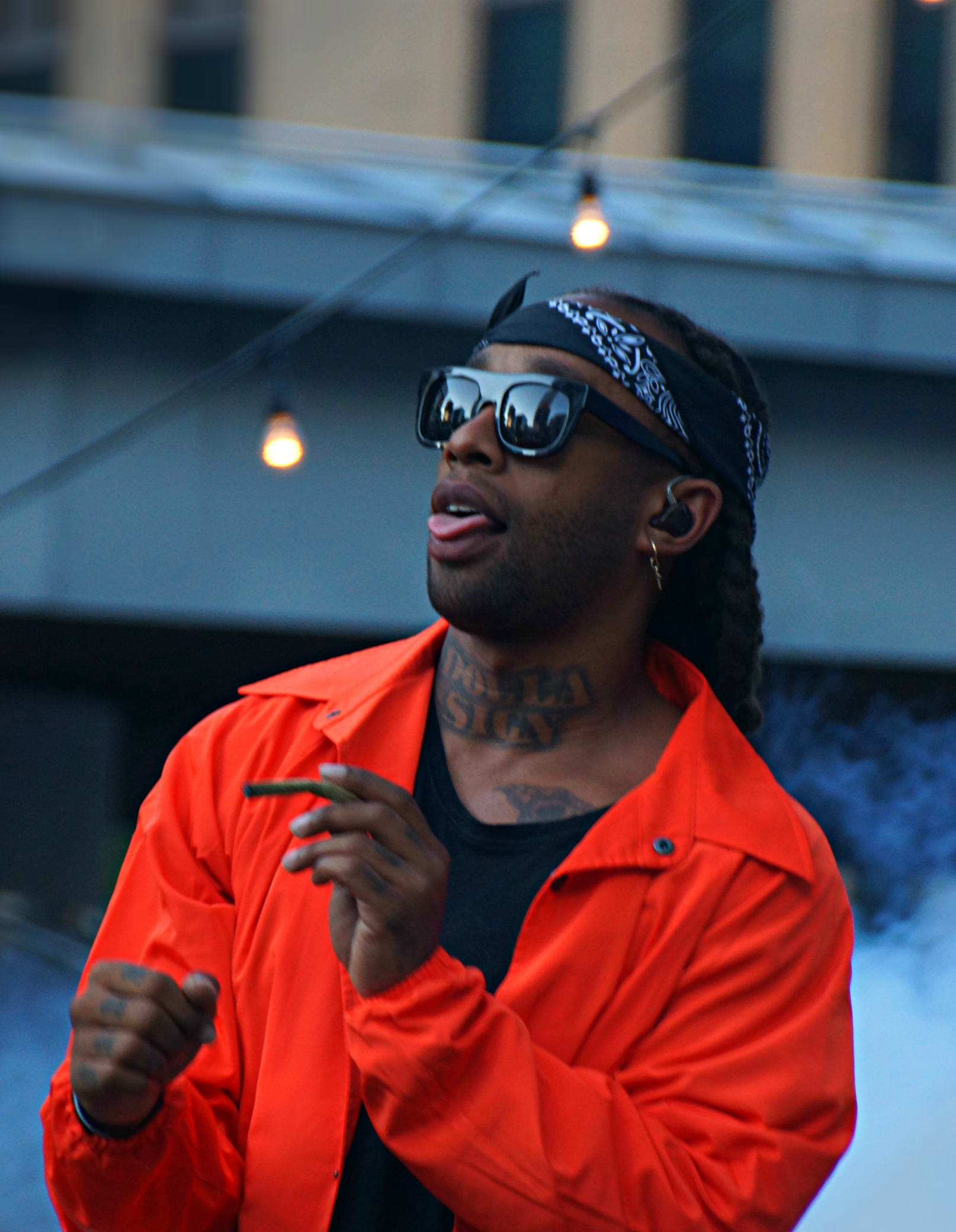
"Bottled Up" features a guest appearance from Ty Dolla Sign.

"Bottled Up" was written by A. Chal, Tyrone William Griffin Jr, Marc Griffin and Dinah Jane with the production done by James Hau, David Park, William Mosgrove, Nick Balding. It is Jane's official debut single but won't be in her upcoming debut album; instead, it serves as a transition from her former music with the group until she "finds her sound".

Jane had a choice to add another artist to the song, and she chose Ty Dolla Sign and Marc E. Bassy; she had previously worked with the former as a part of Fifth Harmony in the top-ten single, "Work from Home", and she's been wanting to work with the latter since her time in the group. She references three of the group's most famous singles: "Work from Home", "Worth It" and "Down". Jane performed the track at the New York Fashion Week during one of Teen Vogue's performances.

She made her solo TV debut on The Tonight Show Starring Jimmy Fallon on Monday, October 8, performing the song alongside Marc E. Bassy and Ty Dolla $ign. In an interview with Music Choice she explained the song's similar sound to Fifth Harmony's music saying, "I remember being in the studio with Marc, and he was just like, ‘So what’s your vibe? Where do you wanna go with this? You wanna just make hits or do you wanna go global?’ I was like, ‘I wanna go global. I want a global record' […] I love this record a lot […] It’s been a year or two... and I feel like because it’s such a bop to me, it can be a bop to other people, as well.”

Jane released Spanish and Portuguese versions of the song on November 8, which kept Ty Dolla Sign's verse and removed Bassy's vocals.

== Composition and lyrics ==
"Bottled Up" is a midtempo, R&B song that draws influences of tropical, reggae and hip hop music. It contains a "light tropical-tinged backbeat with a simple urban bassline." It runs for a total of three minutes and twenty seconds. Lyrically, the song is about "drinking your feelings away". In an interview with Z100, Jane said, "It’s about someone who has a hard time sharing their emotions, so they bottle up their feelings and they turn to smoking and drinking because that’s the way they’re getting it out." The song is in 97 beats per minute.

== Music video ==
The song's music video, directed by Hannah Lux Davis, was released on November 7, 2018.

== Critical reception ==
"Bottled Up" received both positive and negative feedback; the latter was mostly because of the song's sound, which was very similar to that of Fifth Harmony's. Thomas Bleech said that the "chorus was way too simple" and that "not even a guest rap verse from Ty Dolla $ign could save this song and make it somewhat likeable or commercially ready." Mike Neid from Idolator said that "Jane gets a little flirty" and "she and Marc E. Bassy need a little coaxing to open up about their feelings." Matt Gehring from MTV said that they "loved the 'Work from Home and 'Worth It' references" and that they're "ready for a hit maker". HotNewHipHop called the song "upbeat and high energy" and that it tackles "the subject of bottling up emotions in romantic relationships."

== Track listing ==
Digital Download
No.	Title	Length
1.	"Bottled Up" (featuring Ty Dolla Sign and Marc E. Bassy)	3:19

Digital Download
No.	Title	Length
1.	"Bottled Up (Versión Español)" (featuring Ty Dolla Sign)	3:19

Digital Download
No.	Title	Length
1.	"Bottled Up (Versão Português)" (featuring Ty Dolla Sign)	3:20

== Credits and personnel ==
Credits adapted from Tidal.

- Dinah Jane – songwriting, vocals
- Ty Dolla Sign – songwriting, vocals
- Marc E. Bassy – songwriting, vocals
- Alejandro Chal – songwriting
- James Hau – producer
- David Park – producer
- William Mosgrove – producer
- Nick Balding – producer

== Charts ==
Chart (2018)	Peak position
New Zealand Hot Singles (RMNZ)	13
US Pop Digital Songs (Billboard)	17
US Rhythmic Airplay (Billboard)	28
US Pop Radio (Mediabase)	65

== Certifications ==
Certifications for "Bottled Up"
Region	Certification	Certified units/sales
New Zealand (RMNZ)	Platinum	30,000^{‡}
^{‡} Sales+streaming figures based on certification alone.
