= Tyler James (English musician) =

English singer and songwriter (born 1982)

- Born: Kenneth Gordon; 5 January 1982 (age 44); London, England
- Genres: Pop; R&B
- Years active: 2001–2005; 2012–present
- Labels: Island; Polydor

Kenneth Gordon (born 5 January 1982), better known by his stage name Tyler James, is an English singer and songwriter signed to Island Records.

James's debut single, "Why Do I Do?", made an appearance on the UK Singles Chart in 2004, peaking at number 25. His debut studio album, The Unlikely Lad, was released digitally through Island Records on 29 August 2005.

In 2012 James appeared as a contestant on the first series of The Voice UK, making it through to the live final of the show, eventually finishing as the joint runner-up behind series winner Leanne Mitchell. Following his success on The Voice UK, James released his second album, A Place I Go, which peaked at number 47 on the UK Albums Chart.

== Music career ==
=== 2001–2005: The Unlikely Lad ===
After guesting house on the underground R&B track "Wilder" by Stargate in 2001, which became a nightclub favourite in London, James got his first taste of celebrity. In 2002, after touring around the UK's bars, pubs and clubs; evolving his sound and performance, James had garnered enough reputation to be hailed as "The British answer to Justin Timberlake" by The Face magazine, whilst NME hailed him as "one to watch".

Tyler James was signed to Island Records in 2003 after they heard a demo tape featuring his future debut single, "Why Do I Do?". The reggae flavoured song made the 'A' playlist on BBC Radio 2, and entered the UK Singles Chart at No. 25. In early 2004, James toured the UK with best friend Amy Winehouse.

In early 2005, James toured with Natasha Bedingfield and in the spring of 2005, his second single "Foolish" was released, which reached No. 16 on the UK chart. The success of the song saw his first appearance on BBC Television's Top of the Pops. July 2005, James' third single was released. Originally a No. 1 hit for White Town in, James covered "Your Woman". "Your Woman" reached No. 60, whilst his album The Unlikely Lad was released as a digital download in August 2005. The album includes three songs co-written with Amy Winehouse, who also features on the track "Best for Me".

In August 2005, James was supposed to perform at the V Festival, but cancelled due to 'unforeseeable circumstances'. Later that year he toured with McFly, but due to the disappointing chart performance of "Your Woman", James was dropped by Island Records and his debut album was only released digitally at the time. The album was later released on CD on 2 July 2012, following his success on The Voice. The album later peaked at number 34 on the UK Album Downloads Chart in June 2012.

=== 2012–: The Voice UK, A Place I Go and My Amy: The Life We Shared ===
In 2012, James auditioned for The Voice UK, appearing in the third of four 'Blind Audition' shows. With coaches will.i.am, Jessie J, Tom Jones and Danny O'Donoghue, James initially performed the track "(Sittin' On) The Dock of the Bay" by Otis Redding. The performance was met with a positive reception from both Jessie J and will.i.am, though it was the latter who opted to have James on his team. During the show's 'Battle Rounds', James was pitted against 25-year-old Heshima Thompson, winning the performance of "Yeah 3x" by Chris Brown and advancing to the live shows. During the first live show, James performed the James Vincent McMorrow version of "Higher Love" by Stevie Winwood, and was saved by judge will.i.am. In the third live show, James performed Terence Trent D'Arby's "Sign Your Name". The performance saw James land in the bottom three alongside Joelle Moses and Frances Wood, though his place in the semi-final was awarded by coach will.i.am. In the semi-final, James performed Queen's "Bohemian Rhapsody" – and was voted into the final by the public over fellow contestant Jaz Ellington; joining Bo Bruce, Leanne Mitchell and Vince Kidd from Team Danny, Team Tom and Team Jessie respectively. In the final, James performed three tracks: "I'll Be There" (The Jackson 5), "OMG" (Usher) with will.i.am and "Higher Love" (James Vincent McMorrow) for a second time. Alongside singer Bo Bruce, James was announced as the series' runner-up behind Leanne Mitchell.

==== Performances ====
| Performed | Song | Original Artist | Result |
|---|---|---|---|
| Blind Audition | "(Sittin' On) The Dock of the Bay" | Otis Redding | Default Team Will |
| Battle Rounds | "Yeah 3x" (against Heshima Thompson) | Chris Brown | Winner |
| Week 1 | "Higher Love" | Steve Winwood | Safe |
| Week 3 | "Sign Your Name" | Terence Trent D'Arby | Safe |
| Semi-final | "Bohemian Rhapsody" | Queen | Safe |
| Final | "I'll Be There" | The Jackson 5 | 3rd Place |
| Final | "OMG" (with will.i.am) | Usher & will.i.am | 3rd Place |
| Final | "Higher Love" | Steve Winwood | 3rd Place |

On Monday, 10 December 2012, Tyler achieved a lifelong ambition by featuring on the Ken Bruce show on Radio 2. The segment of the show is "Tracks of My Years," where a guest chooses two tracks each day of the show that meant something to them

It was confirmed in July 2012 that James had signed a new joint record deal with Island Records and Universal Music Group and had begun work on his second studio album. James then announced in August that the album's lead single, "Single Tear", would be released in the United Kingdom on 7 October; with the album A Place I Go following on 29 October. James confirmed he had worked with various producers and songwriters for A Place I Go, including The Voice coach will.i.am, Fraser T Smith and Guy Chambers who wrote and produced "Single Tear". The album charted at number 47 on the UK Albums Chart.

In 2015, James starred in the documentary film, Amy that was released in theatres on 3 July about his late friend Amy Winehouse. In 2021, he published My Amy: The Life We Shared , a memoir of his relationship with Winehouse.

== Personal life ==
James grew up in the Canning Town area of London and moved to Camden Town with Amy Winehouse in his late teens where they lived together until her death. James met Winehouse at the age of 13 when they both trained at the Sylvia Young Theatre School.

== Discography ==
=== Studio albums ===
- The Unlikely Lad (2005)
- A Place I Go (2012)

== Filmography ==
- Amy (2015)

== Bibliography ==
- My Amy: The Life We Shared (2021)
