= Marc E. Bassy =

American singer and songwriter

- Born: Marc Griffin; April 9, 1987 (age 39); California, U.S.
- Genres: Hip hop; pop; R&B; soul; reggae-pop
- Occupations: Singer; songwriter; rapper
- Years active: 2007–present
- Formerly of: 2AM Club

Marc Griffin, known professionally as Marc E. Bassy, is an American singer and songwriter from the San Francisco Bay Area. He is the former vocalist of the Los Angeles-based pop band 2AM Club. His solo works include his 2014 mixtape Only the Poets, 2015 release East Hollywood, and the 2016 EP Groovy People, including the single "You & Me" featuring G-Eazy.

After releasing his debut album Gossip Columns through Republic Records in 2017, Bassy opted to go independent, forming New Gold Medal Records and releasing the full-length projects PMD and Little Men in 2019 and 2021, respectively.

Before putting out his own works, he was a songwriter, and wrote for artists such as CeeLo Green, Sean Kingston, Wiz Khalifa, and Ty Dolla Sign.

== Early life ==
Griffin was raised in the Bay Area, where his mother rented from singer-songwriter Tracy Chapman. He was raised in different areas, including Richmond, CA. During his teenage years, he moved to Mill Valley and attended Tamalpais High School. After graduation, he went to UC Santa Cruz for music but only stayed there for two years and left school to start 2AM Club in Los Angeles.

== Career ==
Griffin started his music career as the lead singer of 2AM Club, releasing an album and mixtape. However, the band was dropped by its label Sony/ATV and went on an indefinite hiatus starting June 29, 2015. He went to live with his friend in Los Angeles and wrote songs for other artists. His fame started in Chicago when he set the record for the longest air guitar solo at a silent disco "playing" in front of 30,000 people. After releasing Only the Poets and East Hollywood and receiving positive critical reception, he was signed to Universal Republic Records.

In October 2017, Griffin planned to go on a co-headlining tour, the Bebe & Bassy Tour with American singer and songwriter Bebe Rexha in support of Bassy's debut album Gossip Columns, released on October 13, and Rexha's EP All Your Fault: Pt. 2. However, the tour was short-lived due to an infection putting Rexha on strict vocal rest. In March 2018, Griffin went on a US tour with fellow Bay Area artist Rexx Life Raj for his debut album.

== Discography ==
=== Studio albums ===
List of albums, with selected details
Title	Album details	Peak chart positions
Title	Album details	US
Gossip Columns	Released: October 13, 2017; Label: Republic; Format: Digital download	166
PMD	Released: September 27, 2019; Label: New Gold Medal; Format: Digital download, streaming	—
Little Men	Released: October 8, 2021; Label: New Gold Medal; Format: Digital download, streaming	—
East Hollywood 2	Released: May 27, 2022; Label: New Gold Medal; Format: Digital download, streaming, compact disc	—
Man Makes Plans	Released: December 23, 2022; Label: New Gold Medal; Format: Digital download, streaming	—

=== Mixtapes ===
List of mixtapes, with selected details
Title	Album details
Only the Poets, Vol. 1	Released: July 29, 2014; Label: EO Entertainment; Formats: Digital download

=== Extended plays ===
Title	Extended play details	Peak chart positions	
Title	Extended play details	US	US Heat.
East Hollywood	Released: December 18, 2015; Label: Republic Records; Format: Digital download	—	—
Groovy People	Released: August 5, 2016; Label: Republic Records; Format: Digital download	148	21
Postmodern Depression	Released: October 5, 2018; Label: Republic Records; Format: Digital download	—	—
"—" denotes a recording that did not chart or was not released in that territory.

=== Singles ===
==== As lead artist ====
Title	Year	Peak chart positions			Certification	Album
Title	Year	US	NZ	SWE	Certification	Album
"Relapse" (featuring Iamsu!)	2014	—	—	—		Only the Poets, Vol. 1
"You & Me" (featuring G-Eazy)	2016	58	10	43	RIAA: Platinum; GLF: Platinum; RMNZ: Platinum	Groovy People and Gossip Columns
"Plot Twist" (featuring Kyle)	2017	—	—	—		Gossip Columns
"Love Her Too" (featuring G-Eazy)	2018	—	—	—		Postmodern Depression
"Treat Me So Bad"	2018	—	—	—		Postmodern Depression
"Save Me"	2019	—	—	—		PMD
"Die Hard"	2019	—	—	—		PMD
"Where We're From"	2019	—	—	—		PMD
"—" denotes a recording that did not chart or was not released in that territory.

==== As featured artist ====
List of singles as featured artist, with selected chart positions, showing year released and album name
Title	Year	Peak chart positions	Album
Title	Year	US	Album
"U Crazy" (The Flavr Blue featuring Marc E. Bassy)	2015	—	Non-album singles
"Light It for Me" (THELIONCITYBOY featuring Marc E. Bassy)	2015	—	Non-album singles
"Cut the Lights" (Azure featuring Marc E. Bassy)	2015	—	Leap Year
"You're Good but I'm Better (Jarami Remix)" (Kill J featuring Marc E. Bassy)	2016	—	Non-album single
"Some Kind of Drug" (G-Eazy featuring Marc E. Bassy)	2016	97	When It's Dark Out
"Cool" (Felix Jaehn featuring Marc E. Bassy & Gucci Mane)	2018	—	I
"Bottled Up" (Dinah Jane featuring Marc E. Bassy & Ty Dolla Sign)	2018	—	Non-album single
"Somebody Out There" (Lost Kings featuring Marc E. Bassy)	2019	—	Los Angeles
"Congratulations" (Eric Nam featuring Marc E. Bassy)	2019	—	Before We Begin
"Coffee" (Quinn XCII featuring Marc E. Bassy)	2020	—	A Letter to My Younger Self
"Wheels Up" (Lecrae featuring Marc E. Bassy)	2020	—	Restoration
"Revolving" (Yung Bae featuring Marc E. Bassy)	2020	—	Non-album single
"Do It All Over" (Cheat Codes featuring Marc E. Bassy)	2020	—	Hellraisers, Pt. 1
"Signs" (Party Pupils featuring Marc E. Bassy)	2021	—	Non-album single
"Love Me Better" (Dillon Francis and Shift K3Y featuring Marc E. Bassy)	2021	—	Happy Machine
"—" denotes a recording that did not chart or was not released.

== Music videos ==
Year	Title
2014	"Chemical High"
2014	"Stick to Your Guns"
2014	"American Dream Life"
2015	"Do You There" (Skizzy Mars featuring Marc E. Bassy)
2016	"Some Things Never Change"
2016	"Having Fun"
2016	"Having Fun Pt. 2"
2016	"You & Me" (featuring G-Eazy)
2017	''Til I Get Found''
2018	"Cool" (Felix Jaehn featuring Marc E. Bassy & Gucci Mane)
2018	"Love Her Too" (featuring G-Eazy)
2018	"Treat Me So Bad"
2018	"Manhattan" (Keenan featuring Marc E. Bassy & Skizzy Mars)
2019	"Simma" (featuring Guapdad 4000)
