= White Town =

British-Indian musician and songwriter (born 1966)

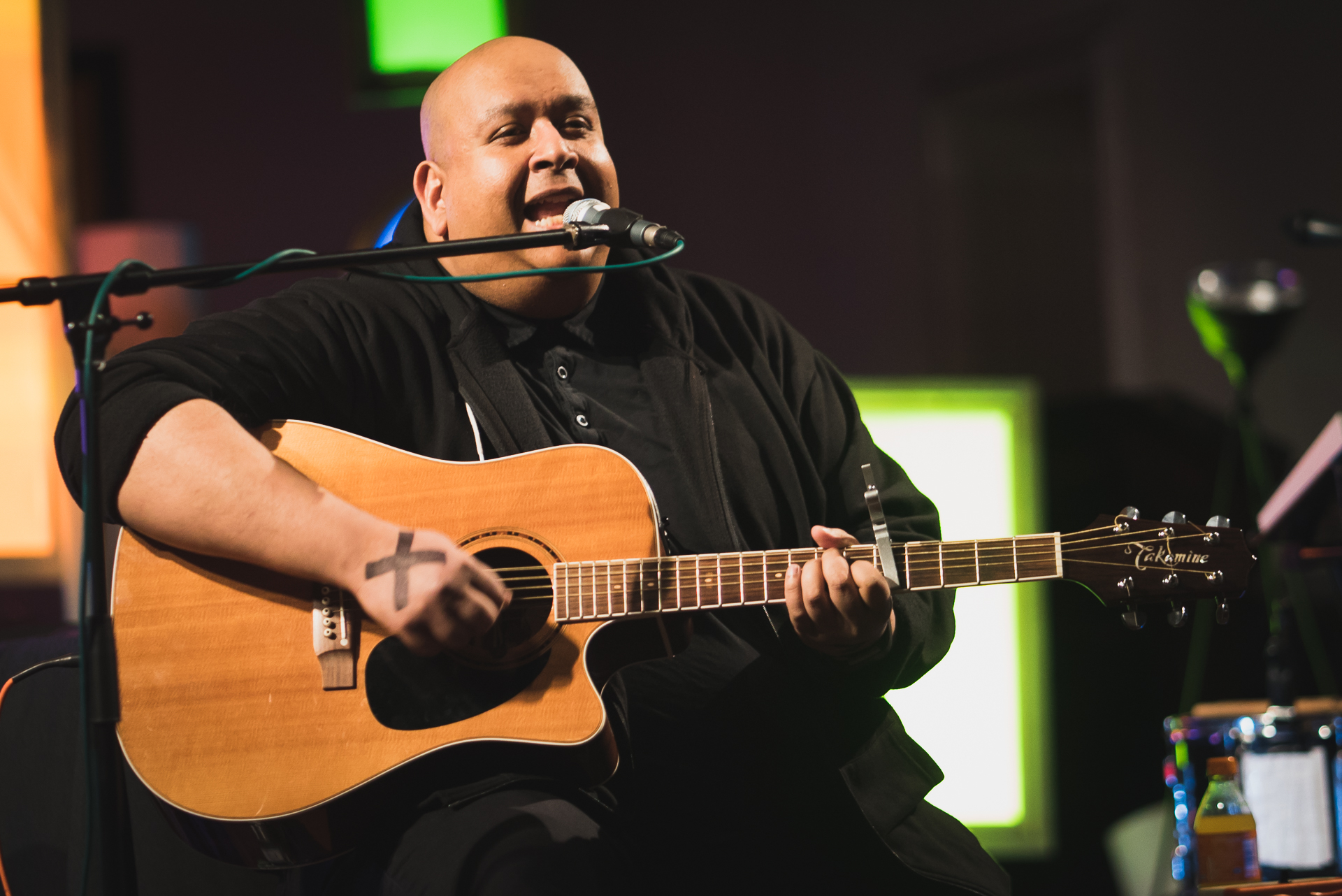
- White Town performing in 2017

Background information
- Born: Jyoti Prakash Mishra; 30 July 1966 (age 60); Rourkela, India
- Origin: Derby, England
- Genres: Indie pop; electronic; alternative dance; alternative rock; trip hop
- Occupation: Musician
- Instruments: Vocals; guitar; keyboards
- Years active: 1989–present
- Labels: Satya; Parasol; Chrysalis/EMI; Elefant; Bzangy
- Website: whitetown.co.uk

Jyoti Prakash Mishra (born 30 July 1966), better known by his stage name White Town, is a British-Indian singer, musician, and producer. He is best known for his 1997 hit song "Your Woman".

== Early life ==
Jyoti Prakash Mishra was born in Rourkela, India, on 30 July 1966, and emigrated to England with his family at the age of three. He grew up in Derby.

== Career ==
White Town was originally the name of a band formed by Mishra in 1989, inspired by a Pixies concert he had attended. Initially, there were other members on guitar, bass, and drums; they played support gigs for various bands, most notably Primal Scream. In 1990, the project released its first self-financed record, White Town EP, on 7" vinyl. This featured Nick Glyn-Davies on drums and Sean Deegan on bass, with Mishra on guitar and vocals. Sean Phillips, who is credited as a guitarist on the EP, joined the band shortly before the release. In time, Deegan and Glyn-Davies left and were replaced live by a drum machine and Leon Wilson on guitar. The rest of the band drifted away in 1990, and Mishra continued with the project as a one-man band from then on, occasionally collaborating with musicians such as Gary Thatcher of the Beekeepers on guitar.

The lead single from White Town's second album, Women in Technology, titled "Your Woman", reached No. 1 on the UK Singles Chart in January 1997. It also peaked at No. 1 in Spain and Iceland; No. 2 in Australia; No. 4 in Canada, Denmark, and Finland; and No. 23 on the U.S. Pop Airplay chart. After a troubled working relationship with EMI, Mishra was dropped from the label in 1997. Since then, he has gone back to working with indie labels such as Parasol Records. In 2006, he contributed the song "The PNAC Cabal" to the charity album Voyces United for UNHCR.

The EP A New Surprise was released in September 2006 by Swedish indie label Heavenly Pop Hits, and was followed by the album Don't Mention the War, which launched Mishra's own Bzangy Records label. A 7" White Town single titled "I Wanna Be Your Ex", with the B-side "Rainy Day", was released by Golly Jane Records in November 2014. Mishra released the albums Deemab and Polyamory in 2019. As of March 2020, he accumulates over 500,000 Spotify streams per month; his work received a boost in popularity in 2020 when Dua Lipa sampled the same trumpet hook White Town sampled in "Your Woman" in her song "Love Again".

== Artistry ==
Mishra has said, "I'm a mediocre singer, I'm a terrible guitarist, I'm a pretty good keyboardist, I'm a good producer, not amazing, but good." Noting his status as a one-hit wonder, he said it is "better than a no-hit wonder" and elaborated, "To be a professional musician and to be entertaining people twenty years after my biggest hit, I feel like I'm the luckiest person alive. Just to have one song that connects with people—most musicians dream their entire lives of having that."

Mishra's musical influences include Michael Nesmith, Sonic Youth, My Bloody Valentine, the Wedding Present, Pixies, Dinosaur Jr., and Devo. He has also cited electronic influences such as Kraftwerk, Depeche Mode and Heaven 17, and recorded a cover version of Orchestral Manoeuvres in the Dark's "Messages".

== Personal life ==
Mishra became straight edge at the age of sixteen and is a radical Marxist; he has been outspoken about his beliefs.

== Discography ==
=== Albums ===
Year	Information	Chart positions		
Year	Information	UK	US	US Heatseekers
1994	Socialism, Sexism & Sexuality: Released: 1994; Label: Bzangy / Parasol	—	—	—
1997	Women in Technology: Released: 25 February 1997; Label: Chrysalis / EMI UK	83	84	4
2000	Peek & Poke: Released: 23 May 2000; Label: Bzangy Groink	—	—	—
2006	Don't Mention the War: Released: 23 October 2006; Label: Bzangy	—	—	—
2011	Monopole: Released: 13 October 2011; Label: Bzangy	—	—	—
2019	Deemab: Released: 1 January 2019; Label: Bzangy	—	—	—
2021	Fairchild Semiconductor: Released: 19 May 2021; Label: Bzangy	—	—	—
2023	Philogrammetry: Released: 9 September 2023; Label: Bzangy	—	—	—

=== EPs ===
Year	Information
1990	White Town: Released: 1990; Label: Satya
1991	Alain Delon: Released: 1991; Label: Parasol
1992	Bewitched: Released: 1992; Label: Parasol
1992	Fairweather Friend: Released: 1992; Label: Elefant
1996	>Abort, Retry, Fail?_: Released: 1996; Label: Parasol / Chrysalis
2015	The Barren Seas EP: Released: 2015; Label: Bzangy
2019	Polyamory: Released: 2019; Label: Bzangy
2024	Marx, Engels, Lenin, Trotsky: Released: 2024

=== Singles ===
Year	Single	Peak chart positions										Certifications	Album
Year	Single	UK	AUS	CAN	FRA	GER	IRE	NL	NZ	SWE	US	Certifications	Album
1990	"Darley Abbey"	—	—	—	—	—	—	—	—	—	—		Non-album singles
1991	"All She Said"	—	—	—	—	—	—	—	—	—	—		Non-album singles
1997	"Your Woman"	1	2	4	5	24	5	21	5	10	23	ARIA: Platinum; SNEP: Gold; RMNZ: Gold; BPI: Gold	>Abort, Retry, Fail?_ and Women in Technology
1997	"Undressed"	57	—	—	—	—	—	—	—	—	—		Women in Technology
1998	"Another Lover"	—	—	—	—	—	—	—	—	—	—		Peek & Poke
2006	"A New Surprise"	—	—	—	—	—	—	—	—	—	—		Don't Mention the War
2010	"Cut Out My Heart"	—	—	—	—	—	—	—	—	—	—		Monopole
2014	"I Wanna Be Your Ex"	—	—	—	—	—	—	—	—	—	—		Deemab
2015	"I'm Giving Up"	—	—	—	—	—	—	—	—	—	—		Deemab
2015	"How I Love You"	—	—	—	—	—	—	—	—	—	—		Deemab

== See also ==
- List of 1990s one-hit wonders in the United States
