= G-Eazy discography =

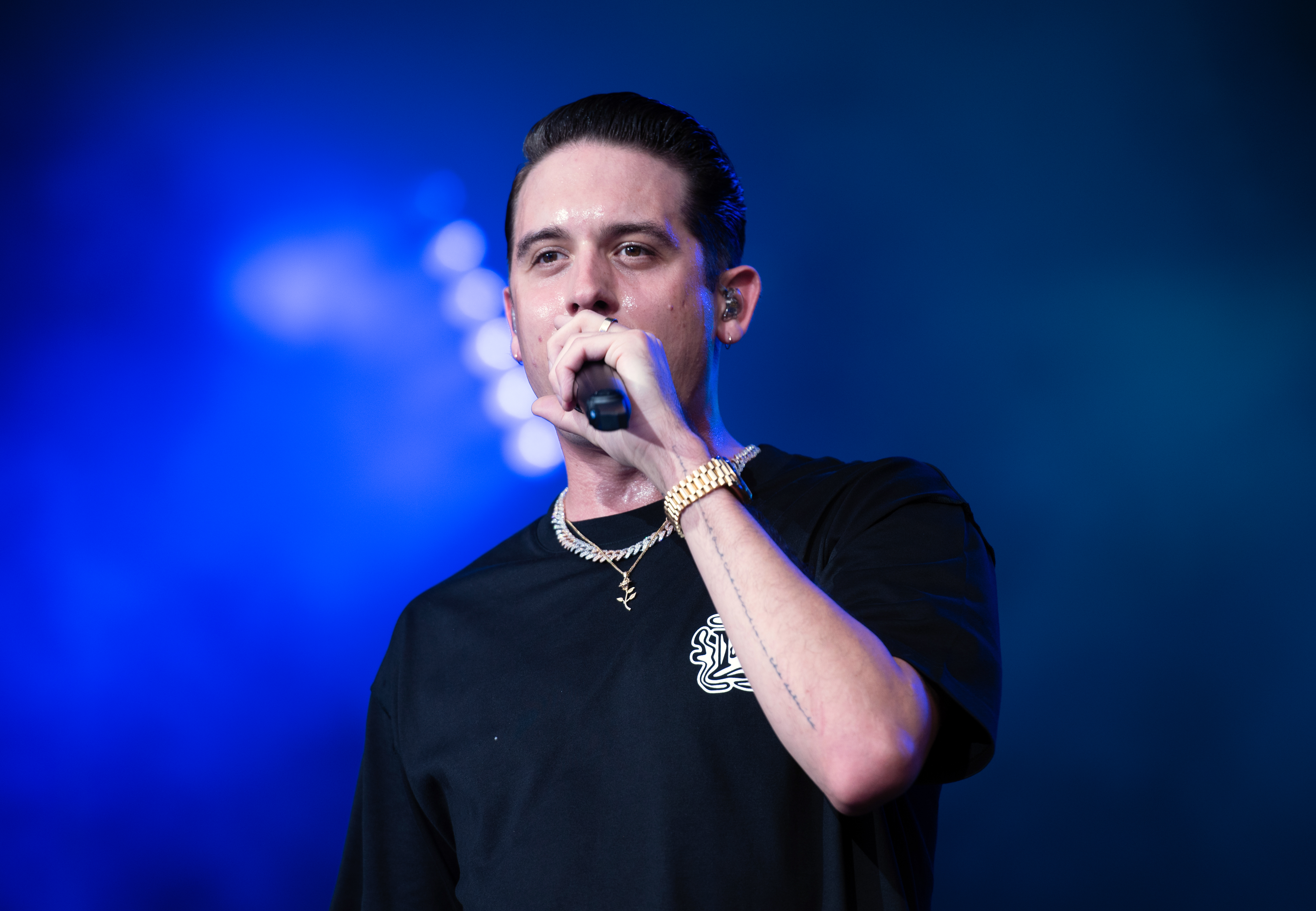
- G-Eazy in 2019
- Studio albums: 8
- EPs: 10
- Singles: 76
- Mixtapes: 6
- Compilation albums: 1

American rapper G-Eazy has released eight studio albums, one compilation album, six mixtapes, ten extended plays and 76 singles (including 24 singles as a featured artist).

His seventh album, Freak Show, was released on June 21, 2024, by RCA Records. The album features guest appearances from Coi Leray and French Montana; recording sessions took place from 2023 to 2024, with the production on the album primarily handled by Statik Selektah. Following its release, he embarked on the Freak Show Tour.

His eighth album, Helium, was released on May 23, 2025, by RCA Records. The album was supported by the Helium Tour, which took place before the album's release.

== Albums ==
=== Studio albums ===
List of albums, with selected chart positions
Title	Album details	Peak chart positions										Sales	Certifications
Title	Album details	US	US R&B /HH	US Rap	AUS	BEL (FL)	CAN	NLD	NZ	SWI	UK	Sales	Certifications
The Epidemic	Released: July 10, 2008; Label: Self-released; Format: Digital download	—	—	—	—	—	—	—	—	—	—		
Must Be Nice	Released: September 26, 2012; Label: Self-released; Format: CD, digital download	—	33	—	—	—	—	—	—	—	—		
These Things Happen	Released: June 23, 2014; Label: BPG, RVG, RCA; Format: CD, digital download, vinyl	3	1	1	98	—	15	—	38	—	171	US: 250,000	RIAA: 2× Platinum; MC: Gold; RMNZ: Platinum
When It's Dark Out	Released: December 4, 2015; Label: BPG, RVG, RCA; Format: CD, digital download, vinyl	5	1	1	36	140	8	79	34	32	62		RIAA: 2× Platinum; BPI: Silver; MC: Platinum; RMNZ: 2× Platinum
The Beautiful & Damned	Released: December 15, 2017; Label: BPG, RVG, RCA; Format: CD, digital download, vinyl	3	1	1	38	87	4	24	25	38	76	US: 68,000	RIAA: Platinum; MC: Platinum; RMNZ: Platinum
These Things Happen Too	Released: September 24, 2021; Label: BPG, RVG, RCA; Format: Digital download	19	12	11	—	—	15	88	34	50	—	CAN: 40,000	MC: Gold
Freak Show	Released: June 21, 2024; Label: BPG, RVG, RCA; Format: Digital download	—	—	—	—	—	—	—	—	—	—		
Helium	Released: May 23, 2025; Label: BPG, RVG, RCA; Format: Digital download	—	—	—	—	—	—	—	—	—	—		
"—" denotes a title that did not chart, or was not released in that territory.

=== Compilation albums ===
Title	Details	Peak chart positions
Title	Details	US
Everything's Strange Here	Released: June 26, 2020; Label: BPG, RVG, RCA; Format: Digital download, streaming	143

=== Mixtapes ===
Title	Details
The Tipping Point	Released: July 28, 2008; Label: Self-released; Format: CD
Sikkis on the Planet	Released: 2009; Label: Self-released; Formats: CD
Quarantine	Released: 2009; Label: Self-released; Formats: CD
Big	Released: April 20, 2010; Label: Self-released; Formats: CD, digital download
The Outsider	Released: March 31, 2011; Label: Self-released; Formats: CD, digital download
The Endless Summer	Released: August 9, 2011; Label: Self-released; Formats: CD, digital download

== Extended plays ==
Title	Details	Peak chart positions				
Title	Details	US	US R&B /HH	US Rap	CAN	SWI
Fresh	Released: March 4, 2008; Label: Self-released; Format: Digital download	—	—	—	—	—
Nose Goes (with Swiss Chriss)	Released: 2011; Label: Self-released; Format: Digital download	—	—	—	—	—
Must Be Twice (with Christoph Andersson)	Released: 2013; Label: Self-released; Format: Digital download	—	—	—	—	—
These Things Also Happened (with Christoph Andersson)	Released: 2014; Label: Self-released; Format: Digital download	—	—	—	—	—
Step Brothers (with Carnage)	Released: March 31, 2017; Label: BPG, RVG, RCA, Heavyweight Records; Formats: Digital download, streaming	81	—	—	—	—
Nothing Wrong	Released: August 2, 2017; Label: BPG, RVG, RCA; Formats: Digital download, streaming	—	—	—	—	—
The Vault	Released: May 24, 2018; Label: BPG, RVG, RCA; Formats: Digital download, streaming	—	—	—	—	—
B-Sides	Released: June 25, 2019 // August 22, 2019 // September 19, 2019; Label: BPG, RVG, RCA; Formats: Digital download, streaming	—	—	—	—	—
Scary Nights	Released: October 18, 2019; Label: BPG, RVG, RCA; Formats: Digital download, streaming	27	19	16	30	91
Nada	Released: November 27, 2024; Label: BPG, RVG, RCA; Formats: Digital download, streaming	—	—	—	—	—
"—" denotes a title that did not chart, or was not released in that territory.

== Singles ==
=== As lead artist ===
List of singles as lead artist, with selected chart positions and certifications, showing year released and album name
Title	Year	Peak chart positions										Certifications	Album
Title	Year	US	US R&B /HH	US Rap	AUS	CAN	DEN	IRE	NZ	SWE	UK	Certifications	Album
"Marilyn" (featuring Dominique LeJeune)	2012	—	—	—	—	—	—	—	—	—	—		Must Be Nice
"Lady Killers" (featuring Hoodie Allen)	2012	—	—	—	—	—	—	—	—	—	—		Must Be Nice
"Been On"	2013	—	—	—	—	—	—	—	—	—	—	RIAA: Gold	These Things Happen
"Almost Famous"	2013	—	—	—	—	—	—	—	—	—	—	RIAA: Gold	These Things Happen
"Tumblr Girls" (featuring Christoph Andersson)	2014	—	47	—	—	—	—	—	—	—	98	RIAA: 3× Platinum; BPI: Gold; RMNZ: 2× Platinum	These Things Happen
"Far Alone" (featuring Jay Ant and E-40)	2014	—	— (Note: "Far Alone" did not enter the Hot R&B/Hip-Hop Songs chart, but peaked at number eight on the Bubbling Under R&B/Hip-Hop Singles chart.)	—	—	—	—	—	—	—	—	RIAA: Platinum	These Things Happen
"I Mean It" (featuring Remo)	2014	98	27	20	—	—	—	—	—	—	—	RIAA: 7× Platinum; BPI: Silver; IFPI DEN: Gold; MC: 2× Platinum; RMNZ: Platinum	These Things Happen
"Lotta That" (featuring ASAP Ferg and Danny Seth)	2014	— (Note: "Lotta That" did not enter the Billboard Hot 100, but peaked at number 14 on the Bubbling Under Hot 100 Singles chart.)	32	21	—	—	—	—	—	—	—	RIAA: Platinum	These Things Happen
"Me, Myself & I" (with Bebe Rexha)	2015	7	2	1	19	9	7	15	9	4	13	RIAA: 9× Platinum; ARIA: 2× Platinum; BPI: 2× Platinum; GLF: 3× Platinum; IFPI DEN: 2× Platinum; MC: 6× Platinum; RMNZ: 3× Platinum	When It's Dark Out
"Order More" (featuring Starrah or Yo Gotti, Lil Wayne and Starrah)	2016	— (Note: "Order More" did not enter the Billboard Hot 100, but peaked at number five on the Bubbling Under Hot 100 Singles chart.)	40	—	—	—	—	—	—	—	—	RIAA: Platinum; MC: Gold	When It's Dark Out
"Drifting" (featuring Chris Brown and Tory Lanez)	2016	98	33	—	—	—	—	—	—	—	—	RIAA: Platinum; MC: Gold; RMNZ: Gold	When It's Dark Out
"Some Kind of Drug" (featuring Marc E. Bassy)	2016	97	36	24	—	—	—	—	—	—	—	RIAA: 2× Platinum; RMNZ: Platinum	When It's Dark Out
"Guala" (with Carnage featuring Thirty Rack)	2017	—	—	—	—	—	—	—	—	—	—		Step Brothers EP
"Good Life" (with Kehlani)	2017	59	29	22	23	53	27	32	21	53	53	RIAA: Platinum; ARIA: Platinum; BPI: Silver; IFPI DEN: Gold; RMNZ: Platinum	The Fate of the Furious: The Album
"No Limit" (featuring ASAP Rocky and Cardi B)	2017	4	2	2	43	7	—	61	21	57	45	RIAA: 8× Platinum; ARIA: Platinum; BPI: Gold; IFPI DEN: Gold; MC: 4× Platinum; RMNZ: 3× Platinum	The Beautiful & Damned
"Him & I" (with Halsey)	2017	14	7	6	10	9	10	16	17	9	22	RIAA: 5× Platinum; ARIA: 2× Platinum; BPI: Platinum; GLF: Platinum; IFPI DEN: Gold; MC: 3× Platinum; RMNZ: 3× Platinum	The Beautiful & Damned
"Sober" (featuring Charlie Puth)	2017	— (Note: "Sober" did not enter the Billboard Hot 100, but peaked at number six on the Bubbling Under Hot 100 Singles chart.)	49	—	—	80	—	—	— (Note: "Sober" did not enter the NZ Top 40 Singles Chart, but peaked at number four on the NZ Heatseeker Singles Chart.)	—	—	RIAA: Gold; MC: Gold	The Beautiful & Damned
"1942" (featuring Yo Gotti and YBN Nahmir)	2018	70	29	—	—	90	—	—	—	—	—	RIAA: 2× Platinum; MC: Platinum; RMNZ: Gold	Uncle Drew
"Drop" (featuring Blac Youngsta and BlocBoy JB)	2018	—	—	—	—	—	—	—	—	—	—		Non-album singles
"Rewind" (featuring Anthony Russo)	2018	—	—	—	—	—	—	—	—	—	—		Non-album singles
"West Coast" (with Blueface, Allblack and YG)	2019	— (Note: "West Coast" did not enter the Billboard Hot 100, but peaked at number one on the Bubbling Under Hot 100 Singles chart.)	37	—	—	81	—	—	— (Note: "West Coast" did not enter the NZ Top 40 Singles Chart, but peaked at number 15 on the NZ Hot Singles Chart.)	—	—	RIAA: Gold; RMNZ: Gold	Beats (soundtrack)
"I Wanna Rock" (featuring Gunna)	2019	— (Note: "I Wanna Rock" did not enter the Billboard Hot 100, but peaked at number six on the Bubbling Under Hot 100 chart.)	—	—	—	79	—	—	— (Note: "I Wanna Rock" did not enter the NZ Top 40 Singles Chart, but peaked at number eight on the NZ Hot Singles Chart.)	—	—		Scary Nights
"Still Be Friends" (Note: This song is only included on the deluxe edition of These Things Happen Too.) (featuring Tory Lanez and Tyga)	2020	—	—	—	79	67	—	—	— (Note: "Still Be Friends" did not enter the NZ Top 40 Singles Chart, but peaked at number 17 on the NZ Hot Singles Chart.)	—	—	RIAA: Platinum; BPI: Silver; MC: 2× Platinum; RMNZ: Platinum	These Things Happen Too
"Moana" (with Jack Harlow)	2020	— (Note: "Moana" did not chart on the Billboard Hot 100, but did peak at number 23 on the Bubbling Under Hot 100 Singles chart.)	—	—	—	72	—	—	— (Note: "Moana" did not enter the NZ Top 40 Singles Chart, but peaked at number 13 on the NZ Hot Singles Chart.)	—	—	MC: Platinum	These Things Happen Too
"Free Porn, Cheap Drugs"	2020	—	—	—	—	—	—	—	—	—	—		Everything's Strange Here
"Stan by Me"	2020	—	—	—	—	—	—	—	—	—	—		Everything's Strange Here
"Everybody's Gotta Learn Sometime"	2020	—	—	—	—	—	—	—	—	—	—		Everything's Strange Here
"Nostalgia Cycle"	2020	—	—	—	—	—	—	—	—	—	—		Everything's Strange Here
"Had Enough"	2020	—	—	—	—	—	—	—	—	—	—		Everything's Strange Here
"Down" (featuring Latto)	2020	—	—	—	—	—	—	—	—	—	—		Non-album single
"Hate the Way" (featuring Blackbear)	2020	71	28	23	—	80	—	—	— (Note: "Hate the Way" did not enter the NZ Top 40 Singles Chart, but peaked at number four on the NZ Hot Singles Chart.)	— (Note: "Hate the Way" did not enter the Swedish Singles Chart, but peaked at number 16 on the Swedish Heatseeker chart.)	—	RIAA: Gold; MC: Gold	These Things Happen Too
"Provide" (featuring Chris Brown and Mark Morrison)	2021	64	24	19	—	90	—	—	— (Note: "Provide" did not enter the NZ Top 40 Singles Chart, but peaked at number three on the NZ Hot Singles Chart.)	—	98	RIAA: Gold; RMNZ: Gold	These Things Happen Too
"At Will" (featuring EST Gee)	2021	—	—	—	—	—	—	—	—	—	—		These Things Happen Too
"Running Wild (Tumblr Girls 2)" (featuring Kossisko)	2021	—	—	—	—	—	—	—	—	—	—		These Things Happen Too
"Breakdown" (featuring Demi Lovato)	2021	—	—	—	—	—	—	—	— (Note: "Breakdown" did not enter the NZ Top 40 Singles Chart, but peaked at number 14 on the NZ Hot Singles Chart.)	— (Note: "Breakdown" did not enter the Swedish Singellista Chart, but peaked at number 17 on the Swedish Heatseeker Chart.)	—		These Things Happen Too
"Lady Killers II" (Christoph Andersson Remix)	2024	— (Note: "Lady Killers II" (Christoph Andersson Remix) did not enter the Billboard Hot 100, but peaked at number six on the Bubbling Under Hot 100 Singles chart.)	47	—	—	60	—	65	— (Note: "Lady Killers" (Christoph Andersson Remix) did not enter the NZ Top 40 Singles Chart, but peaked at number 11 on the NZ Hot Singles Chart.)	— (Note: "Lady Killers" (Christoph Andersson Remix) did not enter the Swedish Singellista Chart, but peaked at number 12 on the Swedish Heatseeker Chart.)	79	BPI: Silver	Non-album single
"Femme Fatale" (featuring Coi Leray and Kaliii)	2024	—	—	—	—	—	—	—	—	—	—		Freak Show
"Lady Killers III"	2024	—	—	—	—	—	—	—	—	—	—		Freak Show
"Anxiety"	2024	—	—	—	—	—	—	—	—	—	—		Freak Show
"Rock n Roll" (with Leony)	2024	—	—	—	—	—	—	—	—	—	—		Oldschool Love
"Vampires" (with Bahari)	2024	—	—	—	—	—	—	—	—	—	—		Helium
"Nada"	2024	—	—	—	—	—	—	—	— (Note: "Nada" did not enter the NZ Top 40 Singles Chart, but peaked at number 21 on the NZ Hot Singles Chart.)	—	—		Helium
"Kiss the Sky"	2025	—	—	—	—	—	—	—	—	—	—		Helium
"Fight & Fuck"	2025	—	—	—	—	—	—	—	—	—	—		Helium
"—" denotes a title that did not chart, or was not released in that territory.

=== As featured artist ===
List of singles as featured artist, with selected chart positions and certifications, showing year released and album name
Title	Year	Peak chart positions									Certifications	Album
Title	Year	US	AUS	BEL (FL)	CAN	FRA	IRE	NZ	SPA	UK	Certifications	Album
"Breakfast" (Ground Up featuring G-Eazy)	2013	—	—	—	—	—	—	—	—	—		Ground Up
"This is America" (Parker Ighile featuring G-Eazy)	2014	—	—	—	—	—	—	—	—	—		Non-album singles
"Hot Box" (Bobby Brackins featuring G-Eazy and Mila J)	2014	—	—	—	—	—	—	—	—	—		Non-album singles
"Lights and Camera (Remix)" (Yuna featuring G-Eazy)	2014	—	—	—	—	—	—	—	—	—		Non-album singles
"Fuck with U" (Pia Mia featuring G-Eazy)	2015	—	—	—	—	—	—	—	—	—	RMNZ: Gold	Non-album singles
"You Don't Own Me" (Grace featuring G-Eazy)	2015	57	1	42	45	—	13	5	19	4	RIAA: Platinum; ARIA: 4× Platinum; BPI: 2× Platinum; MC: 2× Platinum; RMNZ: 3× Platinum	FMA
"Exotic" (Quincy featuring G-Eazy)	2015	—	—	—	—	—	—	—	—	—		Non-album singles
"King Wavy" (Kyle featuring G-Eazy)	2015	—	—	—	—	—	—	—	—	—		Non-album singles
"Forbes" (Borgore featuring G-Eazy)	2015	—	—	—	—	—	—	—	—	—		Keep It Sexy
"Out the Way" (Vell featuring G-Eazy and Gusto)	2015	—	—	—	—	—	—	—	—	—		Non-album singles
"Want It All" (Caleborate featuring G-Eazy)	—	—	—	—	—	—	—	—	—			Non-album singles
"Give It Up" (Nathan Sykes featuring G-Eazy)	2016	—	—	—	—	—	—	—	—	54		Unfinished Business
"You & Me" (Marc E. Bassy featuring G-Eazy)	2016	58	— (Note: Charted as the EP Groovy People in Australia and peaked at number 52.)	—	84	—	66	10	—	150	RIAA: Platinum; RMNZ: 3× Platinum	Groovy People
"Make Me..." (Britney Spears featuring G-Eazy)	2016	17	39	33	20	11	51	— (Note: "Make Me..." did not enter the NZ Top 40 Singles Chart, but peaked at number 3 on the NZ Heatseeker Singles Chart.)	80	42	RIAA: Platinum; MC: Gold	Glory
"FDT Pt. 2" (YG featuring Macklemore and G-Eazy)	2016	—	—	—	—	—	—	—	—	—		Non-album single
"Over Again" (Quiñ featuring G-Eazy)	2016	—	—	—	—	—	—	—	—	—		Galactica
"Party Jumpin' 2" (J. Stallin featuring G-Eazy and The Jacka)	2016	—	—	—	—	—	—	—	—	—		On Behalf of the Streets 2
"LowKey" (Rory Fresco featuring G-Eazy)	2016	—	—	—	—	—	—	—	—	—		Non-album single
"Born Leader" (Nef the Pharaoh featuring G-Eazy)	2016	—	—	—	—	—	—	—	—	—		Non-album single
"Hold On Me" (Mozzy featuring G-Eazy, YG and Lex Aura)	2017	—	—	—	—	—	—	—	—	—		Fake Famous
"Fashion Week" (Wale featuring G-Eazy)	2017	—	—	—	—	—	—	—	—	—		Shine
"Purple Brick Road" (Raekwon featuring G-Eazy)	2017	—	—	—	—	—	—	—	—	—		The Wild
"F.F.F." (Bebe Rexha featuring G-Eazy)	2017	—	—	—	—	—	—	—	—	—		All Your Fault: Pt. 1
"Red Button" (Mansa featuring G-Eazy)	2017	—	—	—	—	—	—	—	—	—		Non-album single
"Say Less" (Dillon Francis featuring G-Eazy)	2017	—	—	—	—	—	—	—	—	—		Non-album single
"I'm On 3.0" (Trae tha Truth featuring T.I., Dave East, Tee Grizzley, Royce da 5'9", Curren$y, DRAM, Snoop Dogg, Fabolous, Rick Ross, Chamillionaire, G-Eazy, Styles P, E-40, Mark Morrison and Gary Clark Jr.)	2017	—	—	—	—	—	—	—	—	—		Tha Truth, Pt. 3
"Love a Loser" (Cassie featuring G-Eazy)	2017	—	—	—	—	—	—	—	—	—		Non-album single
"Sike!" (Marty Grimes featuring P-Lo and G-Eazy)	2017	—	—	—	—	—	—	—	—	—		Cold Pizza
"Go BestFriend 2.0" (Casanova featuring G-Eazy and Rich the Kid)	2018	—	—	—	—	—	—	—	—	—		Commissary
"Reverse" (Vic Mensa featuring G-Eazy)	2018	—	—	—	—	—	—	—	—	—		Hooligans
"Big Film" (Bobby Brackins featuring G-Eazy and Jeremih)	2018	—	—	—	—	—	—	—	—	—		To Kill For
"Why Would I Wait" (Yung Pinch featuring G-Eazy)	2018	—	—	—	—	—	—	—	—	—		Non-album single
"Up Now" (Saweetie with London on da Track featuring G-Eazy and Rich the Kid)	2018	—	—	—	—	—	—	—	—	—		Non-album single
"Down Chick Pt. II" (Yhung T.O. featuring G-Eazy)	2018	—	—	—	—	—	—	—	—	—		Non-album single
"Enough" (Dakari featuring G-Eazy, Tommy Genesis and Jozzy)	2018	—	—	—	—	—	—	—	—	—		Non-album single
"Girls Have Fun" (Tyga featuring Rich the Kid and G-Eazy)	2019	—	97	—	95	—	—	—	—	—	RMNZ: Gold	Legendary
"My Year" (Gashi featuring G-Eazy)	2019	—	—	—	—	—	—	—	—	—		Gashi
"No Keys" (Global Dan featuring G-Eazy)	2019	—	—	—	—	—	—	—	—	—		Global Meltdown
"Wobble Up" (Chris Brown featuring Nicki Minaj and G-Eazy)	2019	— (Note: "Wobble Up" did not enter the Billboard Hot 100, but peaked at number three on the Bubbling Under Hot 100 Singles chart.)	46	—	—	—	—	—	—	—	RIAA: Gold	Indigo
"W.A.N.T.S." (Global Dan featuring G-Eazy)	2019	—	—	—	—	—	—	—	—	—		Global Meltdown
"Blank Marquee" (Yuna featuring G-Eazy)	2019	—	—	—	—	—	—	—	—	—		Rouge
"Throw Fits" (London On Da Track featuring G-Eazy, City Girls and Juvenile)	2019	—	—	—	—	—	—	—	—	—		Non-album singles
"Wait for Me" (Carnage featuring G-Eazy, Wiz Khalifa and Prince George)	2019	—	—	—	—	—	—	—	—	—		Non-album singles
"Girlfriend" (T-Pain featuring G-Eazy)	2019	—	—	—	—	—	—	—	—	—		Non-album singles
"First Things First" (Guapdad 4000 featuring G-Eazy and Reo Cragun)	2019	—	—	—	—	—	—	—	—	—		Non-album singles
"Cut Up (Remix)" (Blac Youngsta featuring Tory Lanez and G-Eazy)	2019	—	—	—	—	—	—	—	—	—		Church on Sunday
"Cravin" (DaniLeigh featuring G-Eazy)	2019	—	—	—	—	—	—	—	—	—		Non-album single
"Freak" (Marteen featuring G-Eazy)	2019	—	—	—	—	—	—	—	—	—		8
"So Much Better" (Tinashe featuring G-Eazy)	2019	—	—	—	—	—	—	—	—	—		Songs for You
"Nadie Como Tú" (Amenazzy featuring G-Eazy)	2019	—	—	—	—	—	—	—	—	—		Non-album singles
"Who You Loving" (DreamDoll featuring G-Eazy and Rahky)	2020	—	—	—	—	—	—	—	—	—		Non-album singles
"Cruel Intentions" (Delacey featuring G-Eazy)	2020	—	—	—	—	—	—	—	—	—		Black Coffee
"2 Seater" (YBN Nahmir featuring G-Eazy and Offset)	2020	—	—	—	—	—	—	—	—	—		Visionland
"Lotto - Remix" (Joyner Lucas featuring Yandel and G-Eazy)	2020	—	—	—	—	—	—	—	—	—		Non-album singles
"The End" (Kossisko featuring G-Eazy)	2020	—	—	—	—	—	—	—	—	—		Non-album singles
"Pass It" (MK XYZ featuring G-Eazy)	2020	—	—	—	—	—	—	—	—	—		Non-album singles
"Bounce Back" (Rexx Life Raj featuring G-Eazy and Jay Anthony)	2020	—	—	—	—	—	—	—	—	—		Non-album singles
"Share That Love" (Lukas Graham featuring G-Eazy)	2020	—	—	—	—	—	—	—	—	—		4 (The Pink Album)
"Ruthless (Nice Guys Always Finish Last) (Remix)" (MarMar Oso featuring G-Eazy and Quando Rondo)	2020	—	—	—	—	—	—	—	—	—		Marvin's Room
"If It Ain't Me" (7AE featuring G-Eazy)	2021	—	—	—	—	—	—	—	—	—		Non-album single
"She's Fire" (Diane Warren featuring G-Eazy and Santana)	2021	—	—	—	—	—	—	—	—	—		Diane Warren: The Cave Sessions, Vol. 1
"Love Runs Out" (Martin Garrix featuring G-Eazy and Sasha Alex Sloan)	2021	—	—	—	—	—	—	— (Note: "Love Runs Out" did not enter the NZ Top 40 Singles Chart, but peaked at number 14 on the NZ Hot Singles Chart.)	—	—		Non-album singles
"Blessed" (Doc Dolla featuring G-Eazy and Mozzy)	2021	—	—	—	—	—	—	—	—	—		Non-album singles
"Demon Time" (Just Bang featuring G-Eazy and Allblack)	2022	—	—	—	—	—	—	—	—	—		Non-album singles
"$WISH" (Vic Mensa featuring G-Eazy and Chance the Rapper)	2023	—	—	—	—	—	—	—	—	—		Victor
"West Coast" (Tdot Illdude featuring G-Eazy)	2023	—	—	—	—	—	—	—	—	—		From the Depths
"WDGAF" (Dave East featuring G-Eazy)	2023	—	—	—	—	—	—	—	—	—		Fortune Favors the Bold
"Work Pt. 4" (Ateez featuring G-Eazy)	2024	—	—	—	—	—	—	—	—	—		Non-album singles
"Let Me See It" (J-Doe featuring G-Eazy)	2024	—	—	—	—	—	—	—	—	—		Non-album singles
"Rock n Roll" (Leony featuring G-Eazy)	2024	—	—	—	—	—	—	—	—	—		Oldschool Love
"Let the World Burn (Remix)"(Chris Grey featuring Ari Abdul and G-Eazy)	2024	—	—	—	—	—	—	—	—	—		Non-album single
"Players Holiday '25" (P-Lo featuring Larry June, Kamaiyah, Saweetie, LaRussell, G-Eazy, Thủy and YMTK)	2024	—	—	—	—	—	—	—	—	—		For the Soil
"Band-Aid" (Bear Bailey featuring G-Eazy)	2025	—	—	—	—	—	—	—	—	—		Lot 53
"By Your Side (In My Mind) Pt. 2" (Leony featuring Felix Jaehn and G-Eazy)	2025	—	—	—	—	—	—	—	—	—		Non-album single
"Slide" (Marc E. Bassy with Nic Nac featuring G-Eazy)	2025	—	—	—	—	—	—	—	—	—		No Hard Feelings
"Rings" (Gashi featuring G-Eazy)	2025	—	—	—	—	—	—	—	—	—		The Killah Whales of Gotham
"10 Second Phone Call" (Badius featuring G-Eazy)	2025	—	—	—	—	—	—	—	—	—		Non-album single
"—" denotes a title that did not chart, or was not released in that territory.

=== Promotional singles ===
Title	Year	Peak chart positions		Certifications	Album
Title	Year	US Bub.	US R&B /HH	Certifications	Album
"You Got Me"	2015	23	45	RIAA: Platinum	When It's Dark Out
"Still"	2016	—	—		Non-album singles
"Bone Marrow" (featuring Danny Seth)	2016	10	— (Note: "Bone Marrow" did not enter the Hot R&B/Hip-Hop Songs chart, but peaked at number two on the Bubbling Under R&B/Hip-Hop Singles chart.)		Non-album singles
"Vengeance on My Mind" (featuring Dana)	2016	—	— (Note: "Vengeance on My Mind" did not enter the Hot R&B/Hip-Hop Songs chart, but peaked at number ten on the Bubbling Under R&B/Hip-Hop Singles chart.)		Non-album singles
"Shake It Up" (featuring E-40, MadeinTYO and 24hrs)	2017	—	—		Non-album singles
"Get Mine" (featuring Snoop Dogg)	2017	—	—		Non-album singles
"Special Love" (featuring Dakari)	2017	—	—		Non-album singles
"Eyes Closed" (with Johnny Yukon)	2017	—	—		Non-album singles
"Wave" (featuring Rexx Life Raj)	2017	—	—		Nothing Wrong
"Nothing Wrong"	2017	—	—		Nothing Wrong
"Just Friends" (featuring Phem) (prod. Jono Dorr and Cecil MB)	2017	—	—		Nothing Wrong
"Get a Bag" (featuring Jadakiss)	2017	—	—		Nothing Wrong
"Endless Summer Freestyle" (featuring YG)	2018	—	—		Non-album singles
"Angel Cry" (with Devon Baldwin)	2020	—	—		Non-album singles
"Love Is Gone" (featuring Drew Love and Jahmed)	2020	—	—		Non-album singles
"A Little More" (featuring Kiana Ledé)	2021	—	—		Non-album singles
"The Announcement (Sex Drugs & Rock and Roll)"	2021	—	—		These Things Happen Too
"Angel"	2022	—	—		Non-album singles
"Tulips & Roses"	2023	—	—		Non-album singles
"Love You Forever"	2024	—	—		Freak Show
"—" denotes a title that did not chart, or was not released in that territory.

== Other charted and certified songs ==
List of other charted and certified songs, with selected chart positions, showing year released and album name
Title	Year	Peak chart positions					Certifications	Album
Title	Year	US	US R&B/HH	CAN	NZ Heat.	NZ Hot	Certifications	Album
"Let's Get Lost" (featuring Devon Baldwin)	2014	— (Note: "Let's Get Lost" did not enter the Billboard Hot 100, but peaked at number nineteen on the Bubbling Under Hot 100 Singles chart.)	—	—	—	—	RIAA: 2× Platinum; RMNZ: Gold	These Things Happen
"Random"	2015	94	31	—	—	—	RIAA: Platinum	When It's Dark Out
"One of Them" (featuring Big Sean)	2015	— (Note: "One of Them" did not enter the Billboard Hot 100, but peaked at number nine on the Bubbling Under Hot 100 Singles chart.)	38	—	—	—	RIAA: Gold	When It's Dark Out
"Of All Things" (featuring Too Short)	2015	—	— (Note: "Of All Things" did not enter the Hot R&B/Hip-Hop Songs chart, but peaked at number two on the Bubbling Under R&B/Hip-Hop Singles chart.)	—	—	—	RIAA: Gold	When It's Dark Out
"Calm Down"	2015	— (Note: "Calm Down" did not enter the Billboard Hot 100, but peaked at number sixteen on the Bubbling Under Hot 100 Singles chart.)	41	—	—	—	RIAA: Platinum; RMNZ: Gold	When It's Dark Out
"What If" (featuring Gizzle)	2015	—	— (Note: "What If" did not enter the Hot R&B/Hip-Hop Songs chart, but peaked at number nine on the Bubbling Under R&B/Hip-Hop Singles chart.)	—	—	—		When It's Dark Out
"Everything Will Be OK" (featuring Kehlani)	2015	—	— (Note: "Everything Will Be OK" did not enter the Hot R&B/Hip-Hop Songs chart, but peaked at number six on the Bubbling Under R&B/Hip-Hop Singles chart.)	—	—	—	RIAA: Gold	When It's Dark Out
"The Plan"	2017	96	41	87	8	—	RIAA: Gold	The Beautiful & Damned
"The Beautiful & Damned" (featuring Zoe Nash)	2017	— (Note: "The Beautiful & Damned" did not enter the Billboard Hot 100, but peaked at number 10 on the Bubbling Under Hot 100 Singles chart.)	—	—	—	—	RIAA: Gold	The Beautiful & Damned
"Love Is Gone" (featuring Drew Love)	2017	—	—	—	10	—		The Beautiful & Damned
"Same Bitches" (Post Malone featuring G-Eazy and YG)	2018	20	—	—	—	—	ARIA: Platinum; RMNZ: Gold	Beerbongs & Bentleys
"Commando" (Logic featuring G-Eazy)	2019	— (Note: "Commando" did not enter the Billboard Hot 100, but peaked at number 2 on the Bubbling Under Hot 100 Singles chart.)	—	—	—	—		Confessions of a Dangerous Mind
"All Facts" (featuring Ty Dolla Sign)	2019	—	—	—	—	23		B-Sides
"Faithful" (featuring Marc E. Bassy)	2021	—	—	—	—	33		These Things Happen Too
"—" denotes a title that did not chart, or was not released in that territory.

== Guest appearances ==
List of non-single guest appearances, and other work done on tracks, with other performing artists, showing year released and album name.
Track	Year	Artist(s)	Contribution	Album
"Casanova"	2012	Hoodie Allen, Skizzy Mars	Feature	Crew Cuts
"Starlife"	2012	Jay Fay	Feature	$$OOPS$$
"I Ain't Missin'"	2014	Doe B, Maino	Feature	Non-album song
"Old No. 7'"	2014	Jez Dior	Feature	The Funeral
"When I Get Back"	2014	The Neighbourhood	Feature	#000000 & #FFFFFF
"Gravity"	2014	The Code	Feature	Non-album song
"Time"	2015	Skizzy Mars, Olivver the Kid	Feature	The Red Balloon Project
"90210"	2015	blackbear	Feature	Deadroses
"Got It Like That (Eleven 11 Mix)"	2015	Pell	Producer, feature	Non-album song
"Queens (G-Eazy Remix)"	2015	MisterWives	Producer, feature	Our Own House
"Forbes"	2015	Borgore	Feature	Keep It Sexy
"Light This Bitch Up"	2016	P-Lo, Jay Ant	Feature	Before Anything – EP
"Wild Things" (G-Eazy Remix)	2016	Alessia Cara	Producer, feather	Non-album songs
"Mercedez"	2016	Riff Raff, J. Doe	Feature	Peach Panther
"Pretty Girls"	2016	Mistah F.A.B., Raekwon, Carl Thomas	Feature	Son of a Pimp, Pt. 2
"Always Wanted"	2016	PJ	Feature	Rare
"Who We Be"	2016	Mike James, J Wise	Feature	The Renegades Rise
"911"	2016	Mike James	Feature	The Mike James EP
"FDT Part 2"	2016	YG, Macklemore	Feature	Non-album song
"Tired of Talking (G-Eazy Remix)"	2016	LÉON	Producer, feature	Treasure – EP
"Straight to the Point"	2016	E-40, Ezale	Feature	The D-Boy Diary: Book 1
"Wicked"	2017	Mansionz	Feature	Mansionz
"Sike!"	2017	Marty Grimes, P-Lo	Feature	Cold Pizza
"Feel Good"	2017	P-Lo	Feature	More Than Anything
"Ain't a Damn Thing Change"	2017	Statik Selektah, Joey Badass, Enisa	Feature	8
"Hold On Me"	2017	Mozzy, YG, Lex Aura	Feature	Fake Famous
"Same Bitches"	2018	Post Malone, YG	Feature	Beerbongs & Bentleys
"Machika (Remix)"	2018	J Balvin, Anitta, Sfera Ebbasta, MC Fioti, Duki, Jeon	Feature	Non-album song
"Motto"	2018	David Guetta, Lil Uzi Vert, Mally Mall	Feature	7
"For You"	2018	Phora, Tory Lanez	Feature	Love is Hell
"Gas Session"	2018	Young Rebz, Nobe, G Mo	Feature	The Resume
"Hangover"	2019	Rayana Jay, Beni Moun	Feature	Love Me Like
"Commando"	2019	Logic	Feature	Confessions of a Dangerous Mind
"Do Not Disturb"	2019	YG, Kamaiyah	Feature	4Real 4Real
"Still Alive"	2019	Berner, A Boogie wit da Hoodie	Feature	El Chivo
"Rain on My Parade"	2019	E-40, Ty Dolla Sign	Feature	Practice Makes Paper
"Pretty Bitches"	2019	RJMrLA, Bree Carter	Feature	On God
"Who You Loving?"	2020	DreamDoll	Feature	Non-album song
"Yes We Can Can"	2022	Snoop Dogg, William Bell	Main	Take Me to the River: New Orleans
"Vanilla Sky"	2023	Statik Selektah	Feature	Round Trip
"Issues"	2024	Skizzy Mars	Feature	Issues
"Guess Who"	2025	JoeyBags	Feature	Rendering
