= Lady Killers (G-Eazy song) =

2012 song by G-Eazy

Single by G-Eazy featuring Hoodie Allen

from the album Must Be Nice
- Released: September 13, 2012
- Genre: Hip hop
- Length: 4:09
- Label: Self-released
- Songwriters: Gerald Gillum; Steven Markowitz
- Producer: G-Eazy

G-Eazy singles chronology
"Marilyn" (2012)	"Lady Killers" (2012)	"Been On" (2013)

Hoodie Allen singles chronology
"Feel the Love" (2012)	"Lady Killers" (2012)	"Cake Boy" (2013)

Audio video
- "Lady Killers" on YouTube

"Lady Killers" is a song by American rapper G-Eazy featuring fellow American rapper Hoodie Allen. It was released on September 13, 2012, as the second single from G-Eazy's second studio album Must Be Nice. The lyrics include hyperbolic statements about the artist's lifestyle and his interactions with women.

== Content ==
"Lady Killers" is about a man who is confident, perhaps to the point of arrogance, in his ability to attract and seduce women.

== Critical reception ==
Samuel Moore of Singersroom ranked the song at number eight on their list of G-Eazy's best songs. Moore called it "a fun, feel-good track that showcases G-Eazy’s playful side".

== Track listing ==
- Digital download
1. "Lady Killers" – 4:09
- Digital download
1. "Lady Killers II" (Christoph Andersson Remix) – 4:57
- Digital download
1. "Lady Killers III" – 2:56

== Lady Killers II ==
"Lady Killers II" (Christoph Andersson Remix)

Single by G-Eazy featuring Christoph Andersson

from the album Must Be Twice
- Released: March 17, 2024
- Genre: Hip hop
- Length: 4:57
- Label: Self-released
- Songwriter: Gerald Gillum
- Producers: G-Eazy; Christoph Andersson

G-Eazy singles chronology
"Breakdown" (2021)	"Lady Killers II" (Christoph Andersson Remix) (2024)	"Femme Fatale" (2024)

Christoph Andersson singles chronology
"Tumblr Girls" (2014)	"Lady Killers II" (2024)

Audio video
- "Lady Killers II" on YouTube

A remix of "Lady Killers" with Christoph Andersson was released on November 14, 2013, as "Lady Killers II". Following resurgence in streaming due to its growing use on TikTok over ten years after its initial release, the song charted in the United Kingdom and other countries.

=== Critical reception ===
Indie Shuffle writer Zach Connett wrote that the song "has an infectious beat, and G spits a round of new verses which really give this song a fresh new vibe". HNHH of HotNewHipHop felt that it "strengthens G-Eazy's already impressive body of work, which has seen positive change over the years".

=== Chart performance ===
The song charted on Billboard's Hot R&B/Hip-Hop Songs chart, peaking at number 47. It also debuted at number 6 on the Bubbling Under Hot 100.

=== Charts ===
Weekly chart performance for "Lady Killers II"
Chart (2024)	Peak position
Austria (Ö3 Austria Top 40)	60
Canada Hot 100 (Billboard)	60
Global 200 (Billboard)	144
Ireland (IRMA)	65
Netherlands (Single Top 100)	84
New Zealand Hot Singles (RMNZ)	11
Switzerland (Schweizer Hitparade)	60
UK Singles (Official Charts)	79
US Bubbling Under Hot 100 (Billboard)	6
US Hot R&B/Hip-Hop Songs (Billboard)	47

=== Certifications ===
Region	Certification	Certified units/sales
New Zealand (RMNZ)	Platinum	30,000^{‡}
United Kingdom (BPI)	Silver	200,000^{‡}
^{‡} Sales+streaming figures based on certification alone.

== Lady Killers III ==
G-Eazy released a remix on May 2, 2024, titled "Lady Killers III". It was produced by MD$, Christoph Andersson and Tane. The track also on the list on his seventh album, Freak Show.
