= Provide (song) =

Single by G-Eazy featuring Chris Brown and Mark Morrison

from the album These Things Happen Too (Deluxe edition)
- Released: February 5, 2021
- Genre: Hip hop; R&B
- Length: 3:06
- Label: RCA
- Songwriters: Gerald Gillum; Chris Brown; Mark Morrison; Carl McCormick; Christian Ward; Gabrielle Nowee; Benjamin Wilson; Douglas Ford; Drew Love; Paul Cabbin
- Producers: Cardiak; Hitmaka; Cabbin

G-Eazy singles chronology
"Hate the Way" (2020)	"Provide" (2021)	"She's Fire" (2021)

Chris Brown singles chronology
"Back to You" (2020)	"Provide" (2021)	"Guilty" / "Rolls Royce Umbrella" (2021)

Mark Morrison singles chronology
"My Life" (2020)	"Provide" (2021)

Music video
- "Provide" on YouTube

"Provide" is a song by American rapper G-Eazy featuring American singer-songwriter Chris Brown and English singer-songwriter Mark Morrison; the latter being credited as a feature due to the sampling of his 1996 single "Return of the Mack", from his debut studio album of the same name. It was released through RCA as a standalone single on February 5, 2021, later being included on the deluxe edition of G-Eazy's fourth studio album These Things Happen Too. The artists, Gabrielle Nowee, Benjamin Wilson, Douglas Ford, Drew Love, and producers Cardiak, Hitmaka, & Paul Cabbin all have writing credits.

== Background and composition ==
G-Eazy has collaborated with Chris Brown twice before "Provide" was released, the first time on G-Eazy's 2015 single "Drifting" and the second time on Brown's 2019 single "Wobble Up", with additional features from Canadian rapper and singer Tory Lanez and Trinidadian-born rapper and singer Nicki Minaj, respectively. However, it serves as the first collaboration between either artist and Morrison.

== Release and promotion ==
On February 1, 2021, G-Eazy revealed the collaboration between himself and Chris Brown that would be released that same week through an Instagram post. The following day, the cover art for the song was revealed, and that also revealed that Mark Morrison would be a part of the collaboration and then confirmed the release date with a comment on his own post. Finally, two days before the song was released, he revealed a small clip of the accompanying visuals.

== Music video ==
The official music video for the song premiered alongside its release on February 5, 2021. It was directed by Edgar Esteves and shot in Los Angeles, California. It contains a large house party that shows them in the company of women and dancing.

=== Critical reception ===
Brandon Caldwell from HipHopDX claimed that the video shows G-Eazy "wooing a woman he met at a burger stop, taking her on a shopping spree in a send-up to the '90s coming of age comedy Clueless" and Chris Brown "being one of the main stars of the party, going from inside to the front yard to roof and more".

== Credits and personnel ==
Credits adapted from Tidal.

- G-Eazy – lead vocals, songwriting
- Chris Brown – featured vocals, songwriting
- Mark Morrison – featured vocals, songwriting
- Cardiak – production, songwriting
- Hitmaka – production, songwriting
- Paul Cabbin – production
- Gabrielle Nowee – songwriting
- Benjamin Wilson – songwriting
- Douglas Ford – songwriting
- Drew Love – songwriting
- Jaycen Joshua – mixing
- Patrizio Pigliapoco – mixing, recording
- Chris Athens – mastering
- Shawn "Source" Jarrett – recording
- DJ Riggins – assistant engineering
- Jacob Richards – assistant engineering
- Mike Seaberg – assistant engineering

== Charts ==
Chart performance for "Provide"
Chart (2021)	Peak position
Canada Hot 100 (Billboard)	90
Global 200 (Billboard)	96
New Zealand Hot Singles (RMNZ)	3
UK Singles (Official Charts)	98
US Billboard Hot 100	64
US Hot R&B/Hip-Hop Songs (Billboard)	24
US Pop Airplay (Billboard)	36
US R&B/Hip-Hop Airplay (Billboard)	33
US Rhythmic Airplay (Billboard)	12

== Certifications ==
Certifications for "Provide"
Region	Certification	Certified units/sales
New Zealand (RMNZ)	Gold	15,000^{‡}
United States (RIAA)	Gold	500,000^{‡}
^{‡} Sales+streaming figures based on certification alone.

== Release history ==
Region	Date	Format(s)	Label	Ref.
Various	February 5, 2021	Digital download; streaming	RCA	
