= Say Less =

Say Less may refer to:

- Say Less (album), 2017 album by Roy Woods
  - "Say Less", the title track
- "Say Less" (Ashanti song), 2017 single by Ashanti
- "Say Less" (Dillon Francis song), 2017 single by Dillon Francis featuring G-Eazy
