= Must Be Nice =

Must Be Nice may refer to:

- Must Be Nice (album), by G-Eazy, 2012
- "Must Be Nice" (Lyfe Jennings song), 2004
- "Must Be Nice" (Nickelback song), 2017
- "Must Be Nice", a song by Ruel from 4th Wall, 2023
