= Take Me to the River (2014 film) =

- Film poster
- Directed by: Martin Shore
- Written by: Martin Shore; Jerry Harrison; Zac Stanford; Rick Clark
- Produced by: Martin Shore; Jerry Harrison; Dan Sameha; Brett Leonard; Lawrence Mitchell; Cody Dickinson
- Starring: Terrence Howard; Mavis Staples; Snoop Dogg; Al Kapone; Frayser Boy; Yo Gotti
- Cinematography: Nathan Black
- Edited by: Maxx Gillman; Julie Janata
- Music by: Cody Dickinson
- Production company: Abramorama
- Distributed by: Abramorama; Shout! Factory; Netflix
- Release date: September 12, 2014
- Running time: 95 minutes
- Country: United States
- Language: English

Take Me to the River is a 2014 American documentary film directed by Martin Shore about music of Memphis, Tennessee. It premiered on March 11, 2014, at SXSW film festival in Austin, Texas. The film was released on Netflix in August 2016, two years after its initial release.

The documentary celebrates the intergenerational and interracial musical influence of Memphis in the face of pervasive discrimination and segregation. The film brings multiple generations of award-winning Memphis and Mississippi Delta musicians together, following them through the creative process of recording a historic new album, to re-imagine the utopia of racial, gender and generational collaboration of Memphis in its heyday. A related education initiative partnered with Berklee College of Music to produce a curriculum and events based on the film.

== Cast ==
- Terrence Howard as himself (host/narrator)
- Mavis Staples as herself
- Snoop Dogg as himself
- Alphonzo Bailey as himself
- Cedric Coleman as himself
- Mario Mims as himself
- Benjamin "Lil' P-Nut" Flores Jr. as himself
- Bobby "Blue" Bland as himself
- Charles "Skip" Pitts as himself
- William Bell as himself

== Soundtrack ==
Take Me to the River: Music from the Motion Picture was released on September 9, 2014 via Stax Records/Concord Music, and consists of twelve songs.

Take Me to the River: Music from the Motion Picture
| No. | Title | Writer(s) | Length |
|---|---|---|---|
| 1. | "Ain't No Sunshine" (performed by Bobby "Blue" Bland & Yo Gotti) | Bill Withers; Mario Mims | 4:29 |
| 2. | "Wish I Had Answered" (performed by Mavis Staples & North Mississippi All-Stars) | | 4:05 |
| 3. | "They Wanna Be Like Me" (performed by The Bar-Kays, 8Ball & MJG) | James Alexander; Larry Dodson; Ezra Williams; Premro Smith; Marlon Goodwin | 3:51 |
| 4. | "Push and Pull" (performed by Bobby Rush & Frayser Boy) | Rufus Thomas; Cedric Coleman | 4:04 |
| 5. | "Supposed to Be" (performed by Booker T. Jones, Al Kapone & North Mississippi All-Stars) | Alphonzo Bailey; Booker T. Jones; Luther Dickinson | 3:56 |
| 6. | "Trying to Live My Life Without You" (performed by Otis Clay & Lil P-Nut) | Lawrence Eugene Williams; Benjamin Flores | 3:48 |
| 7. | "I've Been Buked" (performed by Mavis Staples & North Mississippi All-Stars) | | 4:52 |
| 8. | "I Forgot to Be Your Lover" (performed by William Bell, Snoop Dogg & Stax Music Academy) | William Bell; Calvin Broadus; Booker T. Jones | 4:00 |
| 9. | "If I Should Have Bad Luck" (performed by Charlie Musselwhite & The City Champs) | Charlie Musselwhite | 4:24 |
| 10. | "Knock on Wood" (performed by William Bell & Stax Music Academy) | Eddie Floyd; Steve Cropper | 3:34 |
| 11. | "Hen Pecked" (performed by Bobby Rush & Frayser Boy) | Bobby Rush; Cedric Coleman | 5:19 |
| 12. | "Walk Away" (performed by Terrence Howard & Hi Rhythm Section) | Terrence Howard | 3:15 |
| Total length: | | | 49:37 |

== Reception ==
On the review aggregator website Rotten Tomatoes, 74% of 27 critics' reviews are positive, with an average rating of 5.7/10. The website's consensus reads: "Scattered and uneven, Take Me to the River never adds up to much in terms of narrative documentary, but the music it honors is more than powerful enough to compensate." Metacritic, which uses a weighted average, assigned the film a score of 56 out of 100, based on 11 critics, indicating "mixed or average" reviews.

== Sequel ==
Take Me to the River: New Orleans was premiered on April 20, 2022 at the Broadside Theater in New Orleans. The film stars Aaron Neville, Ivan Neville, Ledisi, G-Eazy, George Porter Jr., Irma Thomas, Dr. John, Galactic, Mannie Fresh, Preservation Hall Jazz Band, Christian Scott and Donald Harrison, with William Bell and Snoop Dogg reprised their appearances.
