= These Things Happen Too =

Studio album by G-Eazy
- Released: September 24, 2021
- Length: 64:16
- Label: BPG; RVG; RCA
- Producer: Adriano; Ambezza; Christoph Andersson; Ben10K; Blueysport; Paul Cabbin; Cardiak; Nick Brongers; Cole M.G.N.; Mike Crook; Damn James; Dakari; Nik Dean; G-Eazy; Hit-Boy; Hitmaka; Ism; George King; Felix Leone; Bill Lupton; Nonstop; OG Parker; Post No Bills; Reske; Romano; Ryan OG; Saint Mino; Nick Sarazen; Scorp Dezel; Jake Torrey; Ty Dolla Sign; UVKillinEm; William Van Zandt

G-Eazy chronology
Everything's Strange Here (2020)	These Things Happen Too (2021)	Freak Show (2024)

Singles from These Things Happen Too
- 1. "Running Wild (Tumblr Girls 2)" Released: August 18, 2021; 2. "Breakdown" Released: September 17, 2021

These Things Happen Too is the sixth studio album by American rapper G-Eazy. It was released on September 24, 2021, through RCA Records. The album serves as the sequel to his third studio album, These Things Happen (2014). The production on the album was handled by multiple producers including Hit-Boy, Cardiak, OG Parker, Dakari, Tay Keith and Hitmaka. The album also features guest appearances from YG, Lil Wayne, E-40, DaBoii, Demi Lovato, Ty Dolla Sign, EST Gee, Chris Brown, Jack Harlow, Tyga and Tory Lanez.

== Background ==
About the album, G-Eazy said that "you live and you learn" about relationships within the project. It is a sequel to his 2014 debut album These Things Happen.

== Release and promotion ==
On September 8, 2021, G-Eazy revealed the album's release date and released a song and teaser video, both titled "The Announcement", as part of its promotion. Exactly two weeks later, on September 22, 2021, he revealed the tracklist and producer credits. Two singles preceded the release of the album. The lead single, "Running Wild (Tumblr Girls 2)", featuring American singer Kossisko, was released on August 18, 2021. The second single, "Breakdown", featuring American singer Demi Lovato, was released on September 17, 2021.

== Reception ==
Tim Hoffman of Riff Magazine said that "While These Things Happen Too delivers plenty of songs that perpetuate the 'player' criticisms lobbed at G-Eazy [...] there’s plenty of substance to be found as well."

== Commercial performance ==
These Things Happen Too debuted at number 19 on the US Billboard 200 with 19,400 album equivalent units in its first week.

== Track listing ==
Standard edition
No.	Title	Writer(s)	Producer(s)	Length
1.	"These Things Happen Too"	Gerald Gillum; Brian Chew; Dakari Gwitira; Dejan Nikolic	Dakari; Nik Dean	3:25
2.	"When You're Gone" (featuring Lil Wayne and The Soul Rebels)	Gillum; Jessie Ackermann; Dwayne Carter; Nick Brongers; Chew; Julian Gosin; Gwitira; Marcus Hubbard; Edgar Machucha; Manuel Perkins; Corey Peyton; Paul Robertson; Erion Williams; Halston Williams	Dakari; Brongers	3:57
3.	"Instructions" (featuring YG)	Gillum; Douglas Ford; Keenon Jackson; Drew Love; Joshua Parker; Christian Ward; Terence Williams; Benjamin Wilson	OG Parker; Hitmaka; Romano	3:11
4.	"Christoph's Interlude"	Gillum; Christoph Andersson	Andersson	0:50
5.	"Wanna Be Myself"	Gillum; Yuval Chain; Larry Gashi; Kossisko Konan; Donald Paton	Felix Leone; UVKillinEm	4:36
6.	"Everything is Everything" (featuring Goody Grace)	Gillum; Chew; Mino Drerup; Daniel Esguerra; Goody Grace; Gwitira; Adriano Rama	Dakari; Saint Mino; Adriano	4:04
7.	"Origami"	Gillum; D. Ford; Mathias Liyew; Ishmael Montague; Trevor Rich; Wilson	Ambezza; Ism	2:37
8.	"Solar Eclipse"	Gillum; Chauncey Hollis; Raynford Humphrey; Quentin Miller	Hit-Boy	2:08
9.	"I, Me & Myself"	Gillum; Rich; Wilson	Ben10k	3:29
10.	"Now & Later" (featuring E-40, DaBoii, and ShooterGang Kony)	Gillum; Wayman Barrow, Jr.; Sama Banya; Ishmael Butler; Gary Fountaine; Thomas Jackson; Jaucquez Lowe; Earl Stevens; Ricardo Thomas; Mary Ann Vieira; Ward	Hitmaka; Nonstop	2:46
11.	"Speed"	Gillum; Andersson; Gregory Brown	Andersson	2:46
12.	"Breakdown" (featuring Demi Lovato)	Gillum; Mick Coogan; Gwitira; Demi Lovato; Sean Myer; Caroline Pennell; Jay Stolar	Dakari; Pennell^{[a]}; Stolar^{[a]}; Coogan^{[a]}; Myer^{[a]}	2:46
13.	"Faithful" (featuring Marc E. Bassy)	Gillum; Jacob Kasher Hindlin; Marc Griffin; Nick Sarazen; Jake Torrey	Torrey; Sarazen; Alex Hau^{[a]}; Tim Davis^{[a]}	4:26
14.	"Wicked Game" (featuring Devon Baldwin)	Chris Isaak	G-Eazy; Cole M.G.N.^{[p]}; Post No Bills^{[a]}^{[v]}	4:17
15.	"Bad Bad News!"	Gillum; Al Cleveland; Benedict Ihesiba Jr.; Jeffrey Kinsey; Casey Manheim	Post No Bills	2:51
16.	"No More" (featuring Ty Dolla Sign)	Gillum; Alexander Krashinsky; Tyrone Griffin, Jr.; James Royo; William Van Zandt	Ty Dolla Sign; Damn James; Van Zandt; Blueysport; Mike Seaberg^{[a]}	2:50
17.	"Running Wild (Tumblr Girls 2)" (featuring Kossisko)	Gillum; Chew; Jocelyn Donald; Gwitira; George King; Konan; Omari Massenburg	Dakari; Cole M.G.N.^{[a]}	3:52
18.	"Time" (featuring Matt Shultz)	Gillum; Oluwaseyi Agbeti; Eric Danchick; Gwitira; Bill Lupton; Jamal Rashid; Jacob Reske; Matthew Shultz; H. Williams; Noel Zancanella	Scorp Dezel; Reske; Lupton	4:37
19.	"Gerald" (featuring Anthony Hamilton)	Gillum; Chew; Cole Marsden Greif-Neill; Gwitira; Anthony Hamilton; Holly Knight; John Loudermilk; Bill Strinberg	Cole M.G.N.; Dakari^{[a]}; Chew^{[a]}	4:40
Total length:				64:16

Deluxe edition
No.	Title	Writer(s)	Producer(s)	Length
20.	"The Announcement (Sex Drugs & Rock and Roll)"	Gillum; Ackermann; Gwitira; Santeri Kauppinen; Edgar Machuca; Lauri Moilanen	Dakari; MD$; GoodJobLarry	3:28
21.	"I Might" (featuring Tay Keith)	Gillum; Brytavious Chambers; Michael Gomez; Thomas Goodwin; Derrick Carrington Gray; H. Williams	Tay Keith	2:34
22.	"At Will" (featuring EST Gee)	Gillum; Rich; Miller; Matthew Samuels; Elias Sticken; George Stone III	Boi-1da; Elyas	2:50
23.	"Still Be Friends" (featuring Tory Lanez and Tyga)	Gillum; Sam Barsh; Altariq Crapps; Mike Elizondo; Cameron Forbes; Michael Hernandez; Humphrey; Curtis Jackson III; Konan; Daystar Peterson; Rich; Michael Stevenson; Andre Young	Foreign Teck; Tariq Beats; Seaberg	3:31
24.	"Provide" (featuring Chris Brown and Mark Morrison)	Gillum; Chris Brown; D. Ford; Love; Carl McCormick; Mark Morrison; Gabrielle Nowee; Ward; Wilson	Cardiak; Hitmaka; Paul Cabbin	3:06
25.	"Moana" (with Jack Harlow)	Gillum; Xavier Dotson; Jack Harlow	Zaytoven	2:58
26.	"Hate the Way" (featuring Blackbear)	Gillum; Catherine Abela; Alyssa Cantu; Mike Crook; Matthew Musto; Ryan Ogren; Benjamin Shubert	Ryan OG; Crook; Seaberg^{[a]}	3:34
27.	"Scars" (featuring Ant Clemons)	Gillum; Matt Bauerschmidt; Anthony Clemons, Jr.; Timothy Mosley; Nathan Perez	Timbaland; Happy Perez	5:28
28.	"Get Right or Get Left" (with Anjelika Jelly Joseph)	Gillum; Alvin Ford, Jr.; Asten Harris; Anjelika Joseph; John Rouchell	Apex Martin; A. Ford; Rouchell	2:48
29.	"Life Is War"	Gillum; Harris	Apex Martin; Mike Dean^{[a]}	5:12

Notes

- ^{^[p]} signifies a primary and vocal producer.
- ^{^[a]} signifies an additional producer.
- ^{^[v]} signifies a vocal producer.

== Personnel ==
=== Musicians ===
- G-Eazy – vocals
- The Soul Rebels – brass (track 2)
- Julius – background vocals (track 6)
- Ben10k – background vocals (track 9)
- David Loucks – choir (track 13)
- Keisha Renee – choir (track 13)
- Luke Edgemon – choir (track 13)
- Norelle – choir (track 13)
- Peaches West – choir (track 13)
- Dakari – background vocals (track 14)
- OG Maco – background vocals (track 15)
- Cole M.G.N. – guitar (track 17)
- George King – programming (track 17)
- Anthony Hamilton – background vocals (track 19)
- Cameron Forbes – background vocals (track 23)
- Isaac Wriston – bass (track 24)

=== Technical ===
- Colin Leonard – mastering (tracks 1–15, 17–22, 25–29)
- Jaycen Joshua – mastering (tracks 16, 23, 25, 26), mixing (2–4, 7–11, 16, 20–29)
- Chris Athens – mastering (track 24)
- Jon Castelli – mixing (tracks 1, 6, 12, 13, 15, 16)
- Manny Marroquin – mixing (tracks 5, 17, 19)
- Michael Freeman – mixing (track 14)
- Chris Galland – mixing (tracks 17, 19)
- Patrizio Pigliapoco – mixing (tracks 18, 24), engineering (24)
- Brian Chew – engineering (tracks 1–22, 25, 27–29)
- Dakari – engineering (tracks 1–18, 20, 21, 23, 25, 27–29)
- Josh Deguzman – engineering (tracks 1, 6, 12, 13, 15)
- Rafael Fai Bautista – engineering (track 16)
- Christian Quinonez – engineering (track 23)
- Shawn "Source" Jarrett – engineering (track 24)
- Nickie Pabon – engineering (track 25)
- DJ Riggins – engineering assistance (tracks 2–4, 7–11, 16, 20–29)
- Jacob Richards – engineering assistance (tracks 2–4, 7–11, 16, 20–29)
- Mike Seaberg – engineering assistance (tracks 2–4, 7–11, 16, 20–29)
- Jeremie Inhaber – engineering assistance (tracks 17, 19)
- Scott Desmarais – engineering assistance (tracks 17, 19)

== Charts ==
Chart performance for These Things Happen Too
Chart (2021)	Peak position
Austrian Albums (Ö3 Austria)	65
Canadian Albums (Billboard)	15
Dutch Albums (Album Top 100)	88
New Zealand Albums (RMNZ)	34
Norwegian Albums (VG-lista)	19
Swiss Albums (Schweizer Hitparade)	50
US Billboard 200	19
US Top R&B/Hip-Hop Albums (Billboard)	12

== Certifications ==
Certifications for These Things Happen Too
Region	Certification	Certified units/sales
Canada (Music Canada)	Gold	40,000^{‡}
^{‡} Sales+streaming figures based on certification alone.
