= Lotta That =

Single by G-Eazy featuring ASAP Ferg and Danny Seth

from the album These Things Happen
- Released: June 10, 2014
- Recorded: 2013
- Genre: Hip hop
- Length: 4:48
- Label: BPG; RVG; RCA
- Songwriters: Gerald Earl Gillum; Darold Brown; Danny Seth Bell; Christoph Andersson; James William Lavigne
- Producers: Christoph Andersson; G-Eazy

G-Eazy singles chronology
"I Mean It" (2014)	"Lotta That" (2014)	"You Don't Own Me" (2015)

ASAP Ferg singles chronology
"Hella Hoes" (2014)	"Lotta That" (2014)	"Doe-Active" (2014)

Danny Seth singles chronology
"Lotta That" (2014)

"Lotta That" is a song by American rapper G-Eazy. It was released on June 10, 2014, as the sixth single from his debut studio album These Things Happen (2014). The song was produced by Eazy himself and Christoph Andersson. It also features guest appearances from American rapper ASAP Ferg and English rapper Danny Seth.

== Chart performance ==
This single reached number 14 on the US Billboard Bubbling Under Hot 100 Singles and peaked at number 32 on the US Billboard Hot R&B/Hip-Hop Songs chart. On November 25, 2025, the single was certified Platinum by the Recording Industry Association of America (RIAA) for sales of over 1,000,000 digital copies in the United States.

== Credits and personnel ==
Credits and personnel are adapted from the These Things Happen album liner notes.

- G-Eazy – writer, vocals, producer
- Christoph Andersson – writer, producer, recording
- ASAP Ferg – writer, vocals
- Danny Seth Bell – writer, vocals
- James W. Lavigne – writer, background vocals
- Jaycen Joshua – mixing
- Ryan Paul – mixing assistant
- Dave Kutch – mastering

== Charts ==
Chart (2014)	Peak position
US Bubbling Under Hot 100 Singles (Billboard)	14
US Hot R&B/Hip-Hop Songs (Billboard)	32
US Hot Rap Songs (Billboard)	21

== Certifications ==
Region	Certification	Certified units/sales
United States (RIAA)	Platinum	1,000,000^{‡}
^{‡} Sales+streaming figures based on certification alone.
