= Hate the Way =

Single by G-Eazy featuring Blackbear

from the album These Things Happen Too (Deluxe edition)
- Released: October 16, 2020
- Length: 3:34
- Label: RCA
- Songwriters: Alyssa Cantu; Benjamin Shubert; Gerald Earl Gillum; Matthew Musto; Mike Crook; Catherine Abela; Ryan Ogren
- Producers: Mike Crook; Ryan Ogren

G-Eazy singles chronology
"Down" (2020)	"Hate the Way" (2020)	"Provide" (2021)

Blackbear singles chronology
"So Sick" (2020)	"Hate the Way" (2020)	"Cheers" (2020)

Music video
- "Hate the Way" on YouTube

"Hate the Way" is a song by American rapper G-Eazy, featuring American musician Blackbear. It was released by RCA Records on October 16, 2020, as a standalone single. The song was written by Alyssa Cantu, Benjamin Shubert, Gerald Earl Gillum, Matthew Musto, Mike Crook, Ryan Ogren and produced by Mike Crook, Ryan Ogren. It was later included on the deluxe edition of G-Eazy's fourth studio album These Things Happen Too.

== Background ==
G-Eazy shared: "I've experienced love in my life," and "I've experienced heartbreak in my life and caused heartbreak in my life and received heartbreak in my life. The power of music is to express and capture the human experience. We live and we experience things. Music for us is an outlet, a way to channel the things we go through and put into a tangible forum."

== Music video ==
The video was uploaded on October 16, 2020, directed by Katarina Webber. It features G-Eazy alongside Blackbear and actress Bria Vinaite from A24's Florida Project.

== Live performance ==
On October 21, 2020, G-Eazy and Blackbear performed the song together for the first time during a virtual concert and livestreamed from the iconic Hollywood Roosevelt Hotel in Los Angeles, California.

== Charts ==
Chart performance for "Hate the Way"
Chart (2020–2021)	Peak position
Canada Hot 100 (Billboard)	80
Global 200 (Billboard)	109
Hungary (Single Top 40)	40
Romania (Airplay 100)	47
Sweden Heatseeker (Sverigetopplistan)	16
US Billboard Hot 100	71
US Hot R&B/Hip-Hop Songs (Billboard)	28
US Pop Airplay (Billboard)	35
US Rhythmic Airplay (Billboard)	18

== Certifications ==
Certifications for "Hate the Way"
Region	Certification	Certified units/sales
Canada (Music Canada)	Gold	40,000^{‡}
United States (RIAA)	Gold	500,000^{‡}
^{‡} Sales+streaming figures based on certification alone.
