= Tumblr Girls =

2014 song by G-Eazy

Single by G-Eazy featuring Christoph Andersson

from the album These Things Happen
- Released: February 23, 2014
- Genre: Hip-hop
- Length: 4:16
- Label: BPG; RVG; RCA
- Songwriters: Gerald Gillum; Christoph Andersson
- Producer: Christoph Andersson

G-Eazy singles chronology
"Almost Famous" (2013)	"Tumblr Girls" (2014)	"Far Alone" (2014)

Christoph Andersson singles chronology
"Metropol" (2011)	"Tumblr Girls" (2014)	"Lady Killers II" (2024)

Music video
- "Tumblr Girls" on YouTube

"Tumblr Girls" is a song by American rapper G-Eazy featuring New Orleans producer Christoph Andersson. It was released on February 23, 2014 as the third single from G-Eazy's third studio album These Things Happen. The sequel to this song Running Wild (Tumblr Girls 2) was released on August 18, 2021.

In late 2023, the song gained a viral surgence on the video app TikTok.

== Content ==
"Tumblr Girls" is about of girls who embody the aesthetic of the popular blogging site Tumblr. G-Eazy expresses a fascination with these women, despite recognizing the shallow nature of their interactions.

== Critical reception ==
David Drake of Pitchfork compared "Tumblr Girls" to the work of Dom Kennedy.

Samuel Moore of Singersroom ranked the song at number seven on their list of G-Eazy's best songs. Moore called it "is a thoughtful and introspective track that showcases G-Eazy's ability to delve into complex themes and emotions".

== Chart performance ==
The song debuted at number 37 on the TikTok Billboard Top 50, and peaked at number 14 by March 16, 2024. The song remained the second-longest on the chart with 28 weeks behind Mitski's "My Love Mine All Mine".

== Music video ==
The song's music video premiered on January 22, 2015, on G-Eazy's Vevo account on YouTube. Directed by Goodboyshady, the video portray models enjoying an idyllic day at the beach.

== Charts ==
Chart (2023–2024)	Peak position
UK Singles (Official Charts)	98
US Hot R&B/Hip-Hop Songs (Billboard)	47

== Certifications ==
Region	Certification	Certified units/sales
Denmark (IFPI Danmark)	Gold	45,000^{‡}
New Zealand (RMNZ)	2× Platinum	60,000^{‡}
United States (RIAA)	3× Platinum	3,000,000^{‡}
^{‡} Sales+streaming figures based on certification alone.
