= Order More =

- Official remix cover

Single by G-Eazy featuring Starrah, Lil Wayne and Yo Gotti

from the album When It's Dark Out
- Released: November 13, 2015 (promotional single); February 18, 2016 (remix single)
- Recorded: 2015
- Genre: Hip hop; trap
- Length: 3:31
- Label: RCA
- Songwriters: Gerald Gillum; Brittany Hazzard; Gary Hill; Joshua Lullen; D. Clax; Matty P.; Christoph Andersson
- Producers: DJ Spinz; Southside; GSP

G-Eazy singles chronology
"Me, Myself & I" (2015)	"Order More" (2015)	"Drifting" (2016)

Starrah singles chronology
"Order More" (2016)	"Swerve" (2017)

Lil Wayne singles chronology
"Switch Up" (2015)	"Order More" (2016)	"No Problem" (2016)

Yo Gotti singles chronology
"Down in the DM" (2015)	"Order More" (2016)	"Law" (2016)

"Order More" is a hip hop song by American rapper G-Eazy featuring songwriter Starrah. It was released on November 13, 2015 as the second single from his second studio album, When It's Dark Out. "Order Mode" was produced by DJ Spinz, GSP, and Southside. The remix features a slightly altered verse from G-Eazy, as well as additional verses by Lil Wayne and Yo Gotti.

== Music video ==
The song has two accompanying music videos. The first one was released on February 16, 2016. The second one premiered on February 18, 2016 on G-Eazy's YouTube account on Vevo.

The video shows G-Eazy enjoying the company of women at a house most of the video. Marty Grimes also makes an appearance.

The video was shot at James Goldstein's mansion and features Goldstein. In Brazil "Order More" won a non-commercial version of Rapper Luciano D10.

== Charts ==
=== Weekly charts ===
Chart (2015–16)	Peak position
US Bubbling Under Hot 100 (Billboard)	5
US Hot R&B/Hip-Hop Songs (Billboard)	40

== Certifications ==
Region	Certification	Certified units/sales
Canada (Music Canada)	Gold	40,000^{‡}
United States (RIAA)	Platinum	1,000,000^{‡}
^{‡} Sales+streaming figures based on certification alone.
