= Swerve (Starrah and Diplo song) =

Single by Starrah and Diplo
- Released: September 8, 2017
- Length: 3:14
- Label: NA$A; Mad Decent
- Producer: Diplo

Starrah singles chronology
"Order More" (2016)	"Swerve" (2017)

Diplo singles chronology
"Phurrr" (2017)	"Swerve" (2017)	"Genius" (2018)

"Swerve" is a song by American singer-songwriter Starrah and American DJ and record producer Diplo, the latter of whom is sole producer of the song. It was released through NA$A and Mad Decent on September 8, 2017, as a follow-up to their previous collaboration "Imperfections", and a single from their forthcoming collaborative extended play.

== Critical reception ==
Kat Bein of Billboard described the song as "low-key with an 808 beat for poppin' bottom halves, and a romantic acoustic guitar melody for putting all those candles to good use", and deemed it "another slow jam set to heat your bedroom all weekend long". He regarded both "Swerve" and "Imperfections" as "steamy, smoky, sex jams". Jordan Sargent of Spin called the song "a modest but cute ballad about the joy of seeing your partner shining" that was "built out of a muffled guitar loop that soon is fleshed out into something hard and sharp". Lindsey India of XXL felt "the upbeat track dives into the two’s flexing skills". Aron A. of HotNewHipHop called it "a fun new song" and "a solid record the two made together". Andrew Rafter of DJ Mag referred the song to a "trap-fuel cut".

== Music video ==
The accompanying lyric video sees Starrah and Diplo transforming into animated cartoons, where they hang out on top of a cartoon metallic car. Starrah wears a black and white mask over her face, while Diplo plays with a fidget spinner in his hand.
