= Random (G-Eazy song) =

Promotional single by G-Eazy

from the album When It's Dark Out
- Released: October 29, 2015
- Recorded: 2015
- Genre: Hip hop
- Length: 3:00
- Label: RCA
- Songwriter(s): Gerald Gillum; Bert Kaempfert; Carl Sigman; Herbert Rehbein; Ozan Yildirim
- Producer(s): OZ

"Random" is a song by American rapper G-Eazy. It was released on October 29, 2015 as a promotional single off his second studio album, When It's Dark Out. The song was produced by OZ.

== Track listing ==
- Digital download
1. "Random" – 3:00

== Music video ==
On October 30, 2015 G-Eazy uploaded the audio for "Random" on his YouTube and Vevo account.

== Charts ==
Chart (2015)	Peak position
US Billboard Hot 100	94
US Hot R&B/Hip-Hop Songs (Billboard)	31

== Certifications ==
Region	Certification	Certified units/sales
United States (RIAA)	Platinum	1,000,000^{‡}
^{‡} Sales+streaming figures based on certification alone.
