= The Endless Summer (G-Eazy mixtape) =

Mixtape by G-Eazy
- Released: August 9, 2011
- Recorded: 2011
- Genre: Hip hop
- Length: 38:36
- Label: Self-released
- Producer: G-Eazy

G-Eazy chronology
The Outsider (2011)	The Endless Summer (2011)	Must Be Nice (2012)

The Endless Summer is a mixtape by American rapper G-Eazy. The mixtape was released on August 12, 2011. The release of The Endless Summer saw G-Eazy achieve his first notable success, with the mixtape being nominated for Best Rap/Hip-Hop Album or Mixtape 2011.

== Release ==
Concerning distribution, the mixtape was released free via a number of sites. G-Eazy explained his decision in doing this in an interview with Earmilk in August 2011, "I just give it all away for free. I find it reaches more people that way. I understand that this new business model scares some people, including the major labels, but that's because they haven't quite figured out how to adapt yet."

== Critical reception ==
The Endless Summer was well received by critics and the public. On djbooth.net The Endless Summer has an average score of 4.7 out of 5 and several other good reviews on websites such as barryfest.com.

== Track listing ==
No.	Title	Length
1.	"Endless Summer" (featuring Erika Flowers)	3:39
2.	"Hang Ten"	2:47
3.	"Runaround Sue" (featuring Greg Banks)	3:58
4.	"Reefer Madness"	2:54
5.	"Make-Up Sex"	3:38
6.	"Well-Known" (featuring Kam Royal)	3:13
7.	"All I Could Do" (featuring Skizzy Mars and Devon Baldwin)	3:42
8.	"Waspy" (featuring Tennis)	3:57
9.	"Acting Up" (featuring Devon Baldwin)	3:10
10.	"Run" (featuring Team Robot)	4:40
11.	"Outta Pocket RMX" (featuring Sonny Shotz, Skizzy Mars, Chippy, and Aquaforce)	3:05
Total length:		38:36
