= Me, Myself & I (G-Eazy and Bebe Rexha song) =

Single by G-Eazy and Bebe Rexha

from the album When It's Dark Out
- Written: 2014
- Released: October 16, 2015
- Recorded: 2015
- Genre: Pop rap
- Length: 4:11
- Label: BPG; RVG; RCA
- Composers: Bleta Rexha; Lauren Christy; Thomas Barnes; Peter Kelleher; Ben Kohn; Michael Keenan; Christoph Andersson
- Lyricists: Gerald Gillum; Bleta Rexha; Lauren Christy
- Producers: Bebe Rexha; Michael Keenan

G-Eazy singles chronology
"You Got Me" (2015)	"Me, Myself & I" (2015)	"Order More" (2016)

Bebe Rexha singles chronology
"Battle Cry" (2015)	"Me, Myself & I" (2015)	"No Broken Hearts" (2016)

Music video
- "Me, Myself & I" on YouTube

"Me, Myself & I" is a song by American rapper G-Eazy and American singer-songwriter Bebe Rexha. It was released on October 16, 2015, as the lead single for his second studio album When It's Dark Out. The song was written by the two artists alongside Lauren Christy; originally produced by Rexha and TMS, it was re-produced by Michael Keenan with additional production by Christoph Andersson and G-Eazy. It was both artists' highest-peaking single, until Rexha's song "Meant to Be" peaked at number two on the US Billboard Hot 100, and G-Eazy's song "No Limit" peaked at number four. It is also featured in the NBA 2K17 soundtrack.

== Recording and production ==
The original version of "Me, Myself and I" was written by Bebe Rexha, Lauren Christy, and TMS in early 2015 with the title "I Don't Need Anything". The song was intended to be part of Rexha's debut album, but her label wasn't convinced it fit the style of her upcoming record. She asked a friend to put her in contact with rapper G-Eazy, because she wanted to do the song with him. Rexha and G-Eazy met three days later and she played the track on piano for him. He loved the track and asked for the song to be on his album. Rexha accepted and began immediately working on the track with Michael Keenan, G-Eazy's producer. Rexha and Keenan re-produced the beat and decided to keep the chorus, post-chorus, and bridge of the original song and put G-Eazy's rap on the verses, while changing the title to "Me, Myself & I". She performed the acoustic of the original version of the song on Elvis Duran and the Morning Show on March 16, 2016.

== Composition ==
According to musicnotes.com, the song is written in the key of C minor, with a tempo of 112 beats per minute.

== Chart performance ==
The song debuted at number 89 on the US Billboard Hot 100 and peaked at number seven, becoming G-Eazy's first top 10 single and Rexha's second after David Guetta's "Hey Mama". It was also G-Eazy and Rexha's highest-charting single, until "Meant To Be" peaked at number two and "No Limit" peaked at number four, as well as the first number one song for both artists on the US Hot Rap Songs chart. As of December 2025, it has sold 9,000,000 copies in the United States.

== Music video ==
The song's music video premiered on October 29, 2015, on G-Eazy's Vevo account on YouTube. Since its release, the video has received over 615 million views. Directed by Taj Stan's Berry, the video surrounds the scene of G-Eazy's birthday, where he is forced to reconcile with his anxieties and the man in the mirror. Bebe Rexha is shown singing throughout the music video.

== Live performances ==
G-Eazy and Bebe Rexha have performed the song at Jimmy Kimmel Live on December 3, 2015, at Tonight Show with Jimmy Fallon on January 25, 2016 and at the 2016 iHeartRadio Music Awards on April 3, 2016.

On August 28, 2016, singer Britney Spears performed the song with G-Eazy at the 2016 MTV Video Music Awards, along with their song "Make Me". The mashup with Spears was also performed at the iHeartRadio Music Festival 2016 in Las Vegas on September 25, 2016, and live at her Las Vegas residency concert, Britney: Piece of Me, on October 21, 2016.

The song is also featured on the soundtrack to the basketball video game, NBA 2K17. It is also one of two menu songs featured in its standalone demo, NBA 2K17: The Prelude.

== Track listing ==
- Digital download
1. "Me, Myself & I" – 4:11
- Digital download
1. "My, Myself & I" (Marc Stout & Scott Svejda Remix) – 4:35
- Digital download
1. "Me, Myself & I" (Viceroy Remix) – 4:23

== Cover versions ==
The song has been covered by American singer Britney Spears and remixed with her 2016 single "Make Me..." in a series of live performances with G-Eazy.

== Personnel ==
- Written by Bebe Rexha, G-Eazy, Lauren Christy, Ben Kohn, Tom Barnes, Peter Kelleher, Michael Keenan and Christoph Andersson
- Originally produced by Bebe Rexha and TMS
- Re-produced by Michael Keenan
- Vocal production by TMS
- Additional production by Christoph Andersson and G-Eazy
- Mixing engineering by Dakarai Gwitira

== Charts ==
=== Weekly charts ===
Chart (2015–22)	Peak position
Australia (ARIA)	19
Austria (Ö3 Austria Top 40)	6
Belgium (Ultratop 50 Flanders)	12
Belgium (Ultratop 50 Wallonia)	16
Canada Hot 100 (Billboard)	9
Czech Republic Airplay (ČNS IFPI)	3
Czech Republic Singles Digital (ČNS IFPI)	2
Denmark (Tracklisten)	7
Finland (Suomen virallinen lista)	5
France (SNEP)	9
Germany (Official German Charts)	7
Hungary (Dance Top 40)	14
Hungary (Rádiós Top 40)	30
Hungary (Single Top 40)	10
Hungary (Stream Top 40)	1
Ireland (IRMA)	15
Italy (FIMI)	22
Latvia (Latvijas Top 40)	33
Netherlands (Dutch Top 40)	7
Netherlands (Single Top 100)	11
New Zealand (Recorded Music NZ)	9
Norway (VG-lista)	2
Poland Airplay (ZPAV)	46
Scotland Singles (OCC)	17
Slovakia Singles Digital (ČNS IFPI)	2
South Africa (EMA)	10
Spain (Promusicae)	25
Sweden (Sverigetopplistan)	4
Switzerland (Schweizer Hitparade)	11
UK Singles (OCC)	13
UK Hip Hop/R&B (OCC)	3
US Billboard Hot 100	7
US Hot R&B/Hip-Hop Songs (Billboard)	2
US Dance/Mix Show Airplay (Billboard)	3
US Dance Club Songs (Billboard)	34
US Pop Airplay (Billboard)	1
US Rhythmic Airplay (Billboard)	1

=== Year-end charts ===
Chart (2016)	Position
Australia (ARIA)	72
Austria (Ö3 Austria Top 40)	31
Belgium (Ultratop Flanders)	45
Belgium (Ultratop Wallonia)	49
Canada (Canadian Hot 100)	21
Denmark (Tracklisten)	44
France (SNEP)	20
Germany (Official German Charts)	19
Hungary (Dance Top 40)	38
Hungary (Single Top 40)	50
Italy (FIMI)	48
Netherlands (Dutch Top 40)	57
Netherlands (Single Top 100)	36
New Zealand (Recorded Music NZ)	32
Spain (PROMUSICAE)	69
Sweden (Sverigetopplistan)	22
Switzerland (Schweizer Hitparade)	24
UK Singles (Official Charts Company)	44
US Billboard Hot 100	19
US Hot R&B/Hip-Hop Songs (Billboard)	5
US Dance/Mix Show Airplay (Billboard)	40
US Mainstream Top 40 (Billboard)	17
US Rhythmic (Billboard)	4

Chart (2022)	Position
Hungary (Rádiós Top 40)	64

== Certifications ==
Region	Certification	Certified units/sales
Australia (ARIA)	2× Platinum	140,000^{‡}
Austria (IFPI Austria)	Gold	15,000^{‡}
Belgium (BRMA)	Platinum	20,000^{‡}
Canada (Music Canada)	6× Platinum	480,000^{‡}
Chile	Platinum	
Denmark (IFPI Danmark)	2× Platinum	180,000^{‡}
Germany (BVMI)	3× Gold	600,000^{‡}
Italy (FIMI)	2× Platinum	100,000^{‡}
Netherlands (NVPI)	Platinum	30,000^{‡}
New Zealand (RMNZ)	4× Platinum	120,000^{‡}
Norway (IFPI Norway)	3× Platinum	180,000^{‡}
Poland (ZPAV)	4× Platinum	80,000^{‡}
Portugal (AFP)	Gold	10,000^{‡}
Spain (Promusicae)	Platinum	40,000^{‡}
Sweden (GLF)	3× Platinum	120,000^{‡}
Switzerland (IFPI Switzerland)	Platinum	30,000^{‡}
United Kingdom (BPI)	2× Platinum	1,200,000^{‡}
United States (RIAA)	9× Platinum	9,000,000^{‡}
^{‡} Sales+streaming figures based on certification alone.
