= When It's Dark Out =

Studio album by G-Eazy
- Released: December 4, 2015
- Recorded: 2014–2015
- Genre: Hip hop
- Length: 61:05
- Labels: BPG; RVG; RCA
- Producers: Christoph Andersson (also exec.); G-Eazy (also exec.); Southside (also exec.); 2 Lz Eric LaVaughn Smith; Boi-1da; Cashmere Cat; DJ Spinz; Gnash; GSP; Happy Perez; Henry Daher; IAMNOBODI; Kane Beatz; K.E. on the Track; Michael Keenan; Mssingno; OZ; Parker Ighile; Remo; Rice N' Peas; the Arcade; ZepFire

G-Eazy chronology
These Things Happen (2014)	When It's Dark Out (2015)	The Beautiful & Damned (2017)

Singles from When It's Dark Out
- 1. "Me, Myself & I" Released: October 14, 2015; 2. "Order More" Released: February 18, 2016; 3. "Drifting" Released: April 17, 2016; 4. "Some Kind of Drug" Released: November 16, 2016

When It's Dark Out is the fourth studio album by American rapper G-Eazy. It was released on December 4, 2015, by RCA Records. The album features guest appearances from Big Sean, Chris Brown, Tory Lanez, Too $hort, Yo Gotti, Lil Wayne, Kehlani, Bebe Rexha, Rick Ross, E-40 and Keyshia Cole. The production was provided by OZ, DJ Spinz, Boi-1da and Southside.

The album was supported by four singles: "Me, Myself & I", "Order More", "Drifting" and "Some Kind of Drug".

When It's Dark Out debuted at number five on the US Billboard 200. It also debuted at number one on the US Top R&B/Hip-Hop Albums. The album sold 135,000 copies in the first week in the United States.

== Recording and production ==
Recording sessions took place during 2014 to 2015, including executive production work by G-Eazy himself, along with his frequent collaborator Christoph Andersson and record producer Southside. The additional production from the album was provided by OZ and Michael Keenan, among others. G-Eazy spoke about expressing his feelings towards his fans about the sounds and how excited he was with the album. When It’s Dark Out was constructed to sound like it could accompany a horror movie as its soundtrack. During recording and production, G-Eazy stated he was influenced by both Wes Craven and Tim Burton, which is why it features many piano loops and “foggy synths” throughout the entire album.

== Promotion ==
The album's first promotional single, "You Got Me", was released on August 17, 2015. The song was produced by Southside and Christoph Andersson.

The album's second promotional single, "Random", was released on October 29, 2015. The song was produced by OZ. The song peaked at number 94 on the US Billboard Hot 100 and was certified Platinum in 2021.

The album's third promotional single, "Sad Boy", was released on November 26, 2015. The song was written and produced by Henry Daher.

== Singles ==
The album's lead single, "Me, Myself & I", was released on October 14, 2015. The song features as a duet track between G-Eazy and American singer-songwriter Bebe Rexha, with production by Michael Keenan. The song peaked at number seven on the US Billboard Hot 100, making it as G-Eazy's first top 10 hit and his second highest charting single to date behind "No Limit" featuring A$AP Rocky and Cardi B which peaked at number 4 on the US Billboard Hot 100. The song also became Rexha's third Billboard Hot 100 single in her career as a featured artist.

"Order More" was first released as the album's promotional single on November 13, 2015. The song features a guest appearance from American singer Starrah, with production by DJ Spinz. The official remix was released after, which features guest appearances from American rappers Lil Wayne and Yo Gotti.

"Drifting" was released on April 17, 2016, to rhythmic radio as the album's third single. The song features guest appearances from American recording artists Chris Brown and Tory Lanez, with production by Cashmere Cat, Mssingno and Happy Perez. The song peaked at number 98 on the US Billboard Hot 100.

"Some Kind of Drug" was released on November 16, 2016, as the album's fourth single. The song features a guest appearance from Marc E. Bassy, while the production was handled by Rice 'N Peas, with additional production by Christoph Andersson and G-Eazy. It has since peaked at number 97 on the US Billboard Hot 100.

== Critical reception ==
Professional ratings
Aggregate scores
Source	Rating
Metacritic	74/100
Review scores
Source	Rating
AllMusic	4/5 stars
Billboard	3.5/5 stars
The Guardian	3/5 stars
Pitchfork	6.7/10

When It's Dark Out was met with generally positive reviews by critics upon its release. Billboard gave it 3.5 stars out of 5, and noted that "a few blatant crossover-R&B attempts feel faceless, but they're largely outliers on an album that gives this former greaser novelty three dimensions". Neil Yeung of AllMusic believed that the 17 tracks were "addictive without it ever growing stale" and commended G-Eazy for how he "executes flawlessly with the shrewdness befitting of his Loyola University music industry studies degree."

Sheldon Pearce of Pitchfork Media thought When It's Dark Out is an improvement from These Things Happen (2014), and that the production and guest appearances seem "like a conscious effort on G-Eazy's part to flesh out his sound into something more dynamic and less one-note." Ben Thompson from The Guardian stated that the album "could’ve hit a home run if it hadn’t worked so hard to cover all the bases", criticising the second half of the record.

== Commercial performance ==
When It's Dark Out debuted at number five on the US Billboard 200. It also debuted at number one on the US Top R&B/Hip-Hop Albums. The album sold 135,000 copies in the first week in the United States. As of January 2016, the album debuted at number six on the UK's Top 40 R&B, making it his most successful release in the United Kingdom and the United States. On July 7, 2016, the album was certified Platinum by the Recording Industry Association of America (RIAA).

== Track listing ==
When It's Dark Out — CD – digital download – streaming
No.	Title	Writer(s)	Producer(s)	Length
1.	"Intro"	Gerald Earl Gillum; Christoph Andersson; Dylan Thomas	Andersson; G-Eazy (add.)	1:11
2.	"Random"	Gillum; Bert Kaempfert; Carl Sigman; Herbert Rehbein; Ozan Yildirim	OZ	3:00
3.	"Me, Myself & I" (with Bebe Rexha)	Gillum; Bebe Rexha; Lauren Christy; Thomas Barnes; Peter Kelleher; Ben Kohn; Michael Keenan; Andersson	Keenan; Andersson (add.); G-Eazy (add.)	4:11
4.	"One of Them" (featuring Big Sean)	Gillum; Sean Anderson	2 Lz Eric LaVaughn Smith; ZepFire (add.); G-Eazy (add.)	3:19
5.	"Drifting" (featuring Chris Brown and Tory Lanez)	Gillum; Chris Brown; Daystar Peterson; Magnus Høiberg; Nathan Perez; Ellison Anderson; David John	Cashmere Cat; Mssingno; Happy Perez	4:33
6.	"Of All Things" (featuring Too $hort)	Gillum; Todd Shaw; Matthew Samuels; Jesse O'Brien; Andersson; Neal Conway; Crystal Waters	Boi-1da; Andersson (add.); G-Eazy (add.)	3:33
7.	"Order More" (featuring Starrah)	Gillum; Brittany Hazzard; Gary Hill; Andersson; Joshua Lullen; David "D. Clax" Claxton; Matthew "Matty P." Pearson	DJ Spinz; Southside; GSP	3:28
8.	"Calm Down"	Gillum; Kurtis Mckenzie; Jon Mills; Andersson	The Arcade	2:07
9.	"Don't Let Me Go" (featuring Grace)	Gillum; Grace Sewell; Parker Ighile; Andersson; Sigman	Ighile; Andersson (add.); G-Eazy (add.)	3:11
10.	"You Got Me"	Gillum; Lullen; Andersson	Southside; Andersson (add.)	3:28
11.	"What If" (featuring Gizzle)	Gillum; Glenda Proby; Sean Combs; Luellen; Andersson	Southside	4:13
12.	"Sad Boy"	Andersson; Gillum; Henry Daher	Daher; Andersson; G-Eazy	3:22
13.	"Some Kind of Drug" (featuring Marc E. Bassy)	Gillum; Andersson; Marc Griffin; Kevin White; Mike Woods	Rice N' Peas; Andersson (add.); G-Eazy (add.)	3:42
14.	"Think About You" (featuring Quiñ)	Gillum; Bianca Quiñones; Andersson; Garrette Nash	Gnash; Andersson; G-Eazy	2:59
15.	"Everything Will Be Ok" (featuring Kehlani)	Gillum; Kehlani Parrish; Remo Green; Andersson	Remo; Andersson (add.); G-Eazy (add.)	5:11
16.	"For This" (featuring IAMNOBODI)	Gillum; Alexander Chigbue	IAMNOBODI	4:10
17.	"Nothing to Me" (featuring E-40 and Keyshia Cole)	Gillum; Earl Stevens; Keyshia Cole; Paris Jones; Daniel Johnson; Andersson; Proby; Vinay Vyas	Kane Beatz; Andersson; G-Eazy	5:29
Total length:				61:07

5th anniversary deluxe edition bonus tracks
No.	Title	Writer(s)	Producer(s)	Length
18.	"Years to Go" (featuring Goody Grace)	Gillum; Goody Grace; Dakarai Gwitira; Dan Henig; Brooke Tomlinson	Henig; Gwitira	3:34
19.	"Lifestyles of the Rich & Hated" (featuring Rick Ross)	Gillum; Carlos E. Martin; Samuels; Quentin Miller; William Roberts; Cooper McGill	Teddi Jones; McGill; Martin	3:54
Total length:				68:35

Google Play bonus track
No.	Title	Writer(s)	Producer(s)	Length
18.	"The Otherside" (featuring Liphemra)	Gillum	4e	3:51
Total length:				64:56

Notes

- G-Eazy and Bebe Rexha are billed together as G-Eazy x Bebe Rexha on "Me, Myself & I".

Sample credits

- "Of All Things" contains a sample of Gypsy Woman (She's Homeless), written and performed by Crystal Waters.

== Charts ==
=== Weekly charts ===
Chart (2015–16)	Peak position
Australian Albums (ARIA)	36
Belgian Albums (Ultratop Flanders)	140
Belgian Albums (Ultratop Wallonia)	183
Canadian Albums (Billboard)	8
Danish Albums (Hitlisten)	12
Dutch Albums (Album Top 100)	87
Finnish Albums (Suomen virallinen lista)	38
French Albums (SNEP)	136
New Zealand Albums (RMNZ)	34
Norwegian Albums (VG-lista)	13
Swedish Albums (Sverigetopplistan)	27
Swiss Albums (Schweizer Hitparade)	32
UK Albums (Official Charts)	24
US Billboard 200	5
US Top R&B/Hip-Hop Albums (Billboard)	1

=== Year-end charts ===
Chart (2016)	Position
Canadian Albums (Billboard)	16
Danish Albums (Hitlisten)	33
US Billboard 200	12
US Top R&B/Hip-Hop Albums (Billboard)	6

Chart (2017)	Position
US Billboard 200	120
US Top R&B/Hip-Hop Albums (Billboard)	88

=== Decade-end charts ===
Chart (2010–2019)	Position
US Billboard 200	192
US Top R&B/Hip-Hop Albums (Billboard)	50

== Certifications ==
Certifications for When It's Dark Out
Region	Certification	Certified units/sales
Canada (Music Canada)	Platinum	80,000^{‡}
Denmark (IFPI Danmark)	Platinum	20,000^{‡}
New Zealand (RMNZ)	2× Platinum	30,000^{‡}
Norway (IFPI Norway)	Platinum	20,000^{‡}
Poland (ZPAV)	Platinum	20,000^{‡}
United Kingdom (BPI)	Silver	60,000^{‡}
United States (RIAA)	2× Platinum	2,000,000^{‡}
^{‡} Sales+streaming figures based on certification alone.
