= Take Me to the River: New Orleans =

2022 film by Martin Shore

- Directed by: Martin Shore
- Written by: Martin Shore; Robert Gordon
- Produced by: Martin Shore; Cody Dickinson; Dan Sameha; Eric Krasno; Eric Heigle; Ian Neville
- Starring: William Bell; G-Eazy; Ledisi; Aaron Neville; Ivan Neville; George Porter Jr.; Snoop Dogg; Irma Thomas
- Narrated by: John Goodman
- Edited by: Conroy Browne; Maxx Gillman; Clayton Halsey; Dante Della Magiore
- Production company: Social Capital Films
- Distributed by: 360 Distribution
- Release date: April 20, 2022
- Running time: 110 minutes
- Country: United States
- Language: English
- Budget: $500,000 (estimated)
- Box office: $43,563 (US)

Take Me to the River: New Orleans is a 2022 American full-length documentary film directed by Martin Shore about music of New Orleans and Louisiana. It was premiered on April 20, 2022, at the Broadside Theater in New Orleans. It was digitally released on February 3, 2023.

It serves as a sequel to 2014 film Take Me to the River: Memphis.

== Cast ==
- John Goodman as himself (narrator)
- William Bell as himself
- Aaron Neville as himself
- Ivan Neville as himself
- Ledisi as herself
- Gerald Gillum as himself
- George Porter Jr. as himself
- Irma Thomas as herself
- Snoop Dogg as himself
- Dr. John as himself
- Galactic as themselves
- Mannie Fresh as himself
- Preservation Hall Jazz Band as themselves
- Christian Scott as himself
- Donald Harrison as himself

== Soundtrack ==
The soundtrack album was released on April 29, 2022 through Petaluma Records. Production was handled by Martin Shore, Cody Dickinson, Eric Heigle, Eric Krasno and Lawrence "Boo" Mitchell. It features contributions from Chief Xian aTunde Adjuah, Davell Crawford, Donald Harrison, George Porter Jr., Irma Thomas, Walter "Wolfman" Washington, Voices of the Wetlands, 5th Ward Weebie, 79rs Gang, Ani DiFranco, Big Freedia, Cheeky Blakk, Dee-1, Dumpstaphunk, Eric Krasno, Galactic, G-Eazy, Ledisi, Lost Bayou Ramblers, Mannie Fresh, Monk Boudreaux, PJ Morton, Rebirth Brass Band, Snoop Dogg, the Dirty Dozen Brass Band, The Roots of Music, The Soul Rebels, The Tipitina's Interns, William Bell, and final performances from The Neville Brothers and Dr. John. The album is dedicated to Charles Neville, Arthur "Art" Lanon Neville Jr., Mac "Dr. John" Rebennack and Jerome Henry "5th Ward Weebie" Cosey.

== Critical response ==
Take Me to the River: New Orleans received mostly positive reviews from film critics. The review aggregator website Rotten Tomatoes has the critical consensus of the film at 90% out of 100, based on ten reviews. At Metacritic, which uses a weighted average, assigned the film a score of 69 out of 100, based on four critics, indicating "generally favorable reviews".

Michael Talbot-Haynes of Film Threat praised the project, saying "Take Me To The River: New Orleans is edited together in a way more organic to music than traditional documentaries, which works wonders". Kimberley Jones of The Austin Chronicle wrote: "the film's greatest strength is its unabashed sentimentality. The look on these artists' faces – their obvious pleasure in being in the room with their heroes, making great music? It's not just good on the ears; it’s good for the heart". Chris Willman of Variety wrote: "eventually the film finds its own rhythm. A movie that includes this disproportionate an amount of the world's leading experts in syncopation would be hard-pressed not to". Carla Hay of Culture Mix wrote: "it's partly a promotional vehicle showing the recording of the songs on the movie's soundtrack and partly a history of New Orleans music culture. The documentary has got some editing issues, but the diverse performances in the studio are joyous to watch". Avi Offer of NYC Movie Guru named the film "an exhilarating tribute to the music of New Orleans". Roger Moore of Movie Nation gave the film 2 and a half out of 4, saying: "it's educational, all this stuff about "second lines" and the "Habanera tempo", who learned from whom and who wrote or invented what. And Shore is to be celebrated for getting all these folks documented and down on film before it's too late".

In a mixed review, Peter Sobczynski of RogerEbert.com wrote that the film "contains a lot of good music and a number of fascinating subjects for discussion, but never quite figures out how to bring them all together in a satisfying manner".
