= I Mean It =

2014 single by G-Eazy

Single by G-Eazy featuring Remo

from the album These Things Happen
- Released: May 13, 2014
- Studio: Endless Summer Studios
- Genre: Hip hop
- Length: 3:58
- Label: RCA
- Songwriters: Gerald Gillum; Remo Green; Christoph Andersson
- Producers: Remo the Hitmaker; Christoph Andersson; G-Eazy

G-Eazy singles chronology
"Far Alone" (2014)	"I Mean It" (2014)	"Lotta That" (2014)

Remo singles chronology
"I Mean It" (2014)

Music video
- "I Mean It" on YouTube

"I Mean It" is a song by American rapper G-Eazy featuring fellow rapper and record producer Remo (otherwise credited as Remo the Hitmaker). It was released on May 13, 2014, as the fifth single from the former's debut studio album These Things Happen (2014). The song was written and produced by its performers alongside longtime G-Eazy producer Christoph Andersson. Despite peaking at number 98 on the US Billboard Hot 100, it has received septuple platinum certification by the RIAA. A remix was released featuring an additional verse by Rick Ross.

== Critical reception ==
David Drake of Pitchfork compared "I Mean It" to the work of Big Sean, citing the song as evidence that "Big Sean may have had a bigger influence on millennial rap fans than has generally been acknowledged".

== Chart performance ==
In the United States, "I Mean It" debuted at number 100 on the Billboard Hot 100 chart for the issue dated January 15, 2015. The song left the chart, before re-entering and peaking at number 98 for the issue dated February 14, 2015. It spent a total of four non-consecutive weeks on the chart. "I Mean It" became G-Eazy's first top 40 song on any music chart, peaking at number 20 and 27 on the Hot Rap Songs and Hot R&B/Hip-Hop Songs charts, respectively. In 2014, the song reached number 88 on the year-end Hot R&B/Hip-Hop Songs chart. Nearly eleven years after its release, "I Mean It" was certified seven-times platinum by the Recording Industry Association of America (RIAA) for sales of seven million digital downloads.

== Music video ==
The video premiered on Vevo, then YouTube, on May 28, 2014.

It was produced by Abby Vo and directed by Bobby Bruderle, who has been a frequent collaborator of G-Eazy's, having done photography work for him since 2011 and directing other videos of his such as "Almost Famous" and "Been On."

In the video, G-Eazy plays a news anchor whose news report is the lyrics of the song, including the chorus, sung by Remo, which G-Eazy lip-syncs. (Remo does not appear in the video.) G-Eazy is at one point shown interviewing himself. The camera occasionally cuts to a female news correspondent, played by Paige Hurd. The video also shows various people watching the news broadcast on TV. Rapper Kyle makes an appearance.

== Live performance ==
On July 24, 2014, G-Eazy made his U.S. television debut performing on Late Night with Seth Meyers performing "I Mean It" and "Far Alone".

== Track listings and formats ==
- Digital download
1. "I Mean It" featuring Remo – 3:56
- Digital download (Remix)
1. "I Mean It" (Remix) featuring Rick Ross and Remo – 3:58
- Streaming (Live performance)
1. "I Mean It" (Live from Spotify SXSW 2014) – 4:07

== Credits and personnel ==
- G-Eazy – writer, vocals, additional production
- Remo the Hitmaker – writer, vocals, producer
- Christoph Andersson – writer, producer, recording at Endless Summer Studios
- Jaycen Joshua – mixing at Larrabee Sound Studios (North Hollywood)
- Ryan Kaul – mixing assistant
- Dave Kutch – mastering at The Mastering Palace (New York City)

Credits and personnel adapted from These Things Happen album liner notes.

== Charts ==
=== Weekly charts ===
Chart (2014–2015)	Peak position
US Billboard Hot 100	98
US Hot R&B/Hip-Hop Songs (Billboard)	27

=== Year-end charts ===
Chart (2014)	Position
US Hot R&B/Hip-Hop Songs (Billboard)	88

== Certifications ==
Region	Certification	Certified units/sales
Canada (Music Canada)	2× Platinum	160,000^{‡}
Denmark (IFPI Danmark)	Gold	45,000^{‡}
Germany (BVMI)	Gold	150,000^{‡}
New Zealand (RMNZ)	Platinum	30,000^{‡}
United Kingdom (BPI)	Silver	200,000^{‡}
United States (RIAA)	7× Platinum	7,000,000^{‡}
^{‡} Sales+streaming figures based on certification alone.
