= Drifting (G-Eazy song) =

Single by G-Eazy featuring Chris Brown and Tory Lanez

from the album When It's Dark Out
- Released: April 17, 2016
- Recorded: 2015
- Genre: Alternative hip hop; R&B; pop
- Length: 4:33
- Label: RCA
- Songwriters: Gerald Gillum; Chris Brown; Daystar Peterson; Nathan Perez
- Producers: Cashmere Cat; Mssingno; Happy Perez

G-Eazy singles chronology
"Order More" (2016)	"Drifting" (2016)	"Give It Up" (2016)

Chris Brown singles chronology
"Paradise" (2016)	"Drifting" (2016)	"Wishing" (2016)

Tory Lanez singles chronology
"Tim Duncan" (2016)	"Drifting" (2016)	"Luv" (2016)

"Drifting" is a song by American rapper G-Eazy. It features vocals from American singer Chris Brown and Canadian singer and rapper Tory Lanez. It was released on April 17, 2016 as the third single of his second studio album When It's Dark Out. The song was produced by Cashmere Cat, Mssingno, and Happy Perez.

== Music video ==
The song's accompanying music video premiered on April 19, 2016 on G-Eazy's Vevo account on YouTube.

== Chart performance ==
On the week of December 26, 2015, "Drifting" debuted at number 98 on the Billboard Hot 100, but left the next week. That same week, it debuted at number 33 on the Hot R&B/Hip-Hop Songs chart. On March 13, 2019, the single was certified platinum for sales of over a million digital copies in the United States.

== Charts ==
=== Weekly charts ===
Chart (2015–16)	Peak position
US Billboard Hot 100	98
US Hot R&B/Hip-Hop Songs (Billboard)	33
US R&B/Hip-Hop Airplay (Billboard)	48
US Rhythmic Airplay (Billboard)	11

== Certifications ==
Region	Certification	Certified units/sales
Canada (Music Canada)	Gold	40,000^{‡}
New Zealand (RMNZ)	Gold	15,000^{‡}
United States (RIAA)	Platinum	1,000,000^{‡}
^{‡} Sales+streaming figures based on certification alone.
