= Breakdown (G-Eazy song) =

2021 single by G-Eazy featuring Demi Lovato

Single by G-Eazy featuring Demi Lovato

from the album These Things Happen Too
- Released: September 17, 2021
- Length: 2:46
- Label: RCA
- Songwriters: Caroline Pennell; Dakarai Gwitira; Demi Lovato; Gerald Earl Gillum; Jay Stolar; Mick Coogan; Sean Myer
- Producer: Dakari

G-Eazy singles chronology
"Love Runs Out" (2021)	"Breakdown" (2021)	"Lady Killers II" (2024)

Demi Lovato singles chronology
"Met Him Last Night" (2021)	"Breakdown" (2021)	"Skin of My Teeth" (2022)

Music video
- "Breakdown" on YouTube

"Breakdown" is a song by American rapper G-Eazy featuring American singer Demi Lovato. It was released on September 17, 2021, as the second single from the former's sixth studio album, These Things Happen Too (2021). G-Eazy and Lovato wrote the song with Caroline Pennell, Jay Stolar, Mick Coogan, Sean Myer, and its producer Dakarai Gwitira. An accompanying music video directed by Daniel CZ was released alongside the song.

== Background ==
Following the announcement of These Things Happen Too, G-Eazy revealed the album's track listing, which includes "Breakdown" as the twelfth track. It contains a feature with Lovato, one of the ten collaborations of the standard edition of the record. In an interview with Apple Music 1's Zane Lowe, G-Eazy declared, "It's one thing to have a conversation in private, but to make it a single and to video it, and to radio it, and to share that on a very, very, very public level, I just applaud Demi's bravery". He also praised her talent. The rapper considers Lovato one of the most talented people he has ever worked with.

== Music video ==
An accompanying music video was released simultaneously with the song. It was directed by G-Eazy's frequent collaborator Daniel CZ. In the video, the artists "face the various media headlines they've made over the years", including Lovato's hospitalization in 2018 for a drug overdose and G-Eazy's arrest and assault charges.

== Live performance ==
On September 28, 2021, the artists performed "Breakdown" live on The Tonight Show Starring Jimmy Fallon. Rolling Stone described the performance as evocative, where G-Eazy and Lovato appear with "headlines about each one, as well as images of nature, scrolling on the video screens behind them".

== Charts ==
Chart performance for "Breakdown"
Chart (2021)	Peak position
New Zealand Hot Singles (RMNZ)	14

== Release history ==
Release dates and formats for "Breakdown"
Region	Date	Format	Label	Ref.
Various	September 17, 2021	Digital download; streaming	RCA	
Italy	September 23, 2021	Radio airplay	Sony	
