= These Things Happen (G-Eazy album) =

Studio album by G-Eazy
- Released: June 23, 2014
- Recorded: 2013–14
- Genre: Hip hop; pop rap
- Length: 56:17
- Label: BPG; RVG; RCA
- Producer: G-Eazy; Blackbear; Christoph Andersson; Jay Ant; Jordan Evans; Matthew Burnett; Remo the Hitmaker

G-Eazy chronology
| Must Be Nice (2012) | These Things Happen (2014) | When It's Dark Out (2015) |

Singles from These Things Happen
- 1. "Been On" Released: August 21, 2013; 2. "Almost Famous" Released: December 11, 2013; 3. "Tumblr Girls" Released: February 23, 2014; 4. "Far Alone" Released: March 14, 2014; 5. "I Mean It" Released: May 13, 2014; 6. "Lotta That" Released: June 10, 2014

These Things Happen is the third studio album and the major label debut by American rapper G-Eazy. It was released on June 23, 2014, by RCA Records in North America, and was subsequently released in the United Kingdom on July 21, 2014. The album features guest appearances from E-40 and ASAP Ferg. Recording sessions took place from 2013 to 2014, with the production on the album that primarily were handled by Christoph Andersson & Dean Earls, Jay Ant, blackbear, Jordan Evans and Matthew Burnett, among others. Following the release, he began to embark his These Things Happen Tour, for the support of this album. The sequel to this album, These Things Happen Too, was released on September 24, 2021.

== Critical reception ==
Professional ratings
Review scores
| Source | Rating |
|---|---|
| AllMusic | 3.5/5 stars |
| Pitchfork | 6.1/10 |
| XXL | 3/5 |

The album received mainly positive reviews. Pitchfork contributor David Drake noted how the record was "moody and atmospheric" throughout its production and G-Eazy's musicianship takes cues from Kendrick Lamar ("Opportunity Cost", "Downtown Love"), Big Sean ("I Mean It") and Dom Kennedy ("Tumblr Girls"). He added that G-Eazy's lyricism works best when he explores inward in response to the world around him and displays glimpses of humanity that should be more prominent, saying "While one does get the feeling that there’s a better album somewhere inside of him, These Things Happen shows promise."

== Commercial performance ==
The album debuted at number three on the Billboard 200, and number one on the Top R&B/Hip-Hop Albums, with first-week sales of 47,000 copies in the United States. In its second week, the album dropped to number 26, selling 9,000 copies. In its third week, the album sold 6,000 more copies in the United States. In its fourth week, the album sold 4,898 more copies, bringing its total album sales to 66,800 in the United States. On November 25, 2025, the album was certified two-times platinum by the Recording Industry Association of America (RIAA) for combined sales and album-equivalent units of over two million units in the United States.

== Track listing ==
| No. | Title | Writer(s) | Producer(s) | Length |
|---|---|---|---|---|
| 1. | "These Things Happen" | Gerald Gillum; Christoph Andersson; Matthew Musto | blackbear | 2:24 |
| 2. | "Far Alone" (featuring E-40 and Jay Ant) | Gillum; Jay Anthony Fort; Earl Stevens; Andersson | Jay Ant; G-Eazy (add.); Andersson (add.) | 4:28 |
| 3. | "I Mean It" (featuring Remo) | Gillum; Andersson; Remo Green | Remo; Andersson (add.); G-Eazy (add.) | 3:56 |
| 4. | "Interlude" | Andersson; William Bevan | Andersson | 0:45 |
| 5. | "Opportunity Cost" | Gillum; Jordan Evans; Matthew Burnett; Bevan | Evans; Burnett | 3:54 |
| 6. | "Almost Famous" | Gillum; Andersson | Andersson | 4:29 |
| 7. | "Lotta That" (featuring A$AP Ferg and Danny Seth) | Gillum; Darold Brown; Danny Seth Bell; Andersson; James William Lavigne | Andersson; G-Eazy | 4:49 |
| 8. | "Factory Girl (Skit)" | | | 0:13 |
| 9. | "Downtown Love" (featuring John Michael Rouchell) | Gillum; John Michael Rouchell; Andersson; Devon Baldwin | G-Eazy | 5:27 |
| 10. | "Complete" | Gillum; Andersson; Elgin Lumpkin; Troy Oliver | Andersson | 3:09 |
| 11. | "Let's Get Lost" (featuring Devon Baldwin) | Gillum; Devon Baldwin; Andersson; Thomas Bangalter; Edwin Birdsong; Michael Dean; Guy-Manuel de Homem-Christo; Kanye West | G-Eazy; Andersson | 4:01 |
| 12. | "Shoot Me Down" (featuring Anthony Stewart) | Gillum; Anthony Stewart; Andersson | G-Eazy | 3:17 |
| 13. | "Been On" | Gillum; Andersson | Andersson | 3:29 |
| 14. | "Remember You" (featuring blackbear) | Gillum; Andersson; Musto | Blackbear | 3:36 |
| 15. | "Tumblr Girls" (featuring Christoph Andersson) | Gillum; Andersson | Andersson | 4:16 |
| 16. | "Just Believe" | Gillum; Andersson; Fabrice Dumont; Stephan Haier; Christophe Hetier; Angela McCluskey | Andersson | 4:03 |
| Total length: | | | | 56:16 |

== Charts ==
=== Weekly charts ===
| Chart (2014–15) | Peak position |
|---|---|
| Australian Albums (ARIA) | 98 |
| UK Albums (OCC) | 171 |
| UK R&B Albums (OCC) | 16 |
| US Billboard 200 | 3 |
| US Top R&B/Hip-Hop Albums (Billboard) | 1 |

=== Year-end charts ===
| Chart (2014) | Position |
|---|---|
| US Billboard 200 | 159 |
| US Top R&B/Hip-Hop Albums (Billboard) | 34 |
| Chart (2015) | Position |
| US Billboard 200 | 89 |
| US Top R&B/Hip-Hop Albums (Billboard) | 31 |
| Chart (2016) | Position |
| US Billboard 200 | 71 |

== Certifications ==
| Region | Certification | Certified units/sales |
|---|---|---|
| Canada (Music Canada) | Gold | 40,000^{‡} |
| Denmark (IFPI Danmark) | Gold | 10,000^{‡} |
| New Zealand (RMNZ) | Platinum | 15,000^{‡} |
| Poland (ZPAV) | Platinum | 20,000^{‡} |
| United States (RIAA) | 2× Platinum | 2,000,000^{‡} |
^{‡} Sales+streaming figures based on certification alone.
