= Must Be Nice (album) =

Studio album by G-Eazy
- Released: September 26, 2012
- Recorded: 2012
- Genre: Hip hop
- Length: 30:14
- Producer: Gerald Gillum

G-Eazy chronology
The Endless Summer (2011)	Must Be Nice (2012)	These Things Happen (2014)

Singles from Must Be Nice
- 1. "Marilyn" Released: February 19, 2012; 2. "Lady Killers" Released: September 13, 2012

Must Be Nice is the second studio album by American rapper G-Eazy. It was released on September 26, 2012.

== Track listing ==
All tracks are written by Gerald Gillum

No.	Title	Length
1.	"Hello"	2:37
2.	"Plastic Dreams" (featuring Johanna Fay)	3:53
3.	"Lady Killers" (featuring Hoodie Allen)	4:09
4.	"Mad" (featuring Devon Baldwin)	3:10
5.	"Interlude"	0:40
6.	"Marilyn" (featuring Dominique LeJeune)	3:16
7.	"Stay High" (featuring Mod Sun)	3:36
8.	"Breathe"	2:51
9.	"Must Be Nice" (featuring Johanna Fay)	3:26
10.	"Loaded" (featuring DJ Carnage) (bonus track)	2:36
Total length:		30:14

== Charts ==
Chart (2015)	Peak position
US Top R&B/Hip-Hop Albums (Billboard)	33
