= Say Less (Dillon Francis song) =

2017 song by Dillon Francis

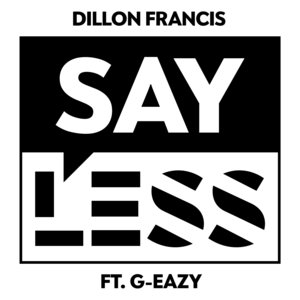

Single by Dillon Francis featuring G-Eazy
- Released: April 5, 2017
- Genre: Trap
- Length: 3:24
- Label: IDGAFOS
- Songwriter(s): Dillon Francis; Gerald Earl Gillum; James Hersey
- Producer(s): Dillon Francis

Dillon Francis singles chronology
"Anywhere" (2016)	"Say Less" (2017)	"Another Dimension" (2017)

G-Eazy singles chronology
"Good Life" (2017)	"Say Less" (2017)	"I'm On 3.0" (2017)

Music video
- "Say Less" on YouTube

"Say Less" is a single by American electronic music producer Dillon Francis featuring American rapper G-Eazy. It was released on April 5, 2017

== Composition ==
Website edm.com mentioned: "The song can heard G-Eazy’s vocals match up perfectly with the rhythms and vibe heard in the track."

== Music video ==
The music video was released on July 13, 2017, directed by Mr. Whitmore. It was shot in Los Angeles, and starred Francis and G-Eazy. Just like the title of the song, recorded a euphoric and raucous night out. It also featured a special cameo by Australian actor Luke Hemsworth.

== Charts ==
=== Weekly charts ===
Chart (2017)	Peak position
US Hot Dance/Electronic Songs (Billboard)	35

=== Year-end charts ===
Chart (2017)	Position
US Hot Dance/Electronic Songs (Billboard)	97
