= G-Eazy =

American rapper (born 1989)

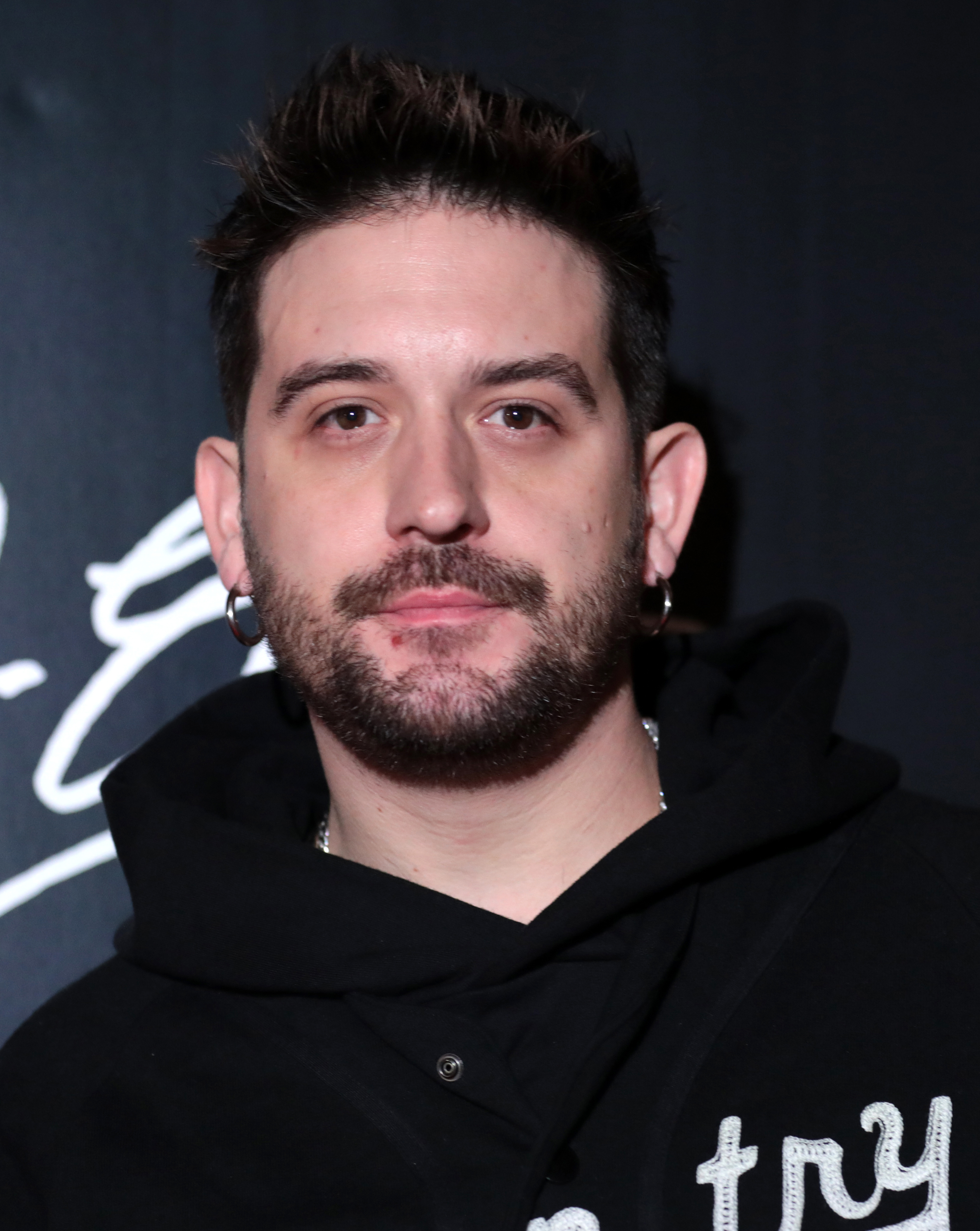
- G-Eazy in 2023

Background information
- Born: Gerald Earl Gillum; May 24, 1989 (age 37); Oakland, California, US
- Education: Loyola University New Orleans (BA)
- Genres: West Coast hip-hop; pop rap
- Occupations: Rapper; singer; songwriter; record producer; actor
- Works: G-Eazy discography
- Years active: 2006–present
- Labels: Empire (current); RCA (former); BPG; RVG
- Website: g-eazy.com

Gerald Earl Gillum (born May 24, 1989), known professionally as G-Eazy, is an American rapper and singer-songwriter. Based in Oakland, California, he began his career in 2006 and self-released two studio albums before signing with RCA Records to release his third album and major label debut, These Things Happen (2014). It peaked at number three on the Billboard 200 and spawned the single "I Mean It" (featuring Remo), which received triple platinum certification by the Recording Industry Association of America (RIAA) and marked his first entry on the Billboard Hot 100.

His fourth and fifth albums, When It's Dark Out (2015) and The Beautiful & Damned (2017), both debuted within the Billboard 200's top five. Their respective lead singles, "Me, Myself & I" (with Bebe Rexha) and "No Limit" (featuring Cardi B and ASAP Rocky), both entered the Billboard Hot 100's top ten; the latter peaked at number four on the chart and remains his highest-charting song. His sixth album, These Things Happen Too (2021), was met with a commercial decline, peaking at number 19 on the Billboard 200. His seventh and eighth albums, Freak Show (2024) and Helium (2025), both failed to chart in any territory.

== Early life ==
Gerald Earl Gillum was born on May 24, 1989, the eldest of two sons. His mother, Suzanne Olmsted, was a fine arts professor. He has a younger brother named James. Gillum has stated that his father is of partial Mexican descent.

When Gillum was in first grade, his mother left his father, and he then moved in with his grandparents in Berkeley, California, where he attended Berkeley High School. They later moved to North Oakland, although Gillum continued to attend school in Berkeley. Gillum attended Loyola University New Orleans, where he graduated with a BA in music industry studies in 2011.

== Career ==
=== 2008–14: Career beginnings ===
Starting out as a record producer, G-Eazy began working on singles while he was still a student at the Loyola University at New Orleans with his producer Christoph Andersson who also was a student there. He gained some recognition for being a part of the new hip-hop scene back in the East Bay of the San Francisco Bay Area, joining with such artists as Lil B, Crohn and The Cataracs. He became a member of a local hip-hop group called "The Bay Boyz", who had released several songs on their Myspace page.

In 2008, he was performing at a college talent show and was nearly booed off, when Matt Bauerschmidt noticed him and signed him as a client to his new music management company The Revels Group that he started with Matt Davis.

In 2010, G-Eazy was given an opportunity to open for some well-known artists, most notably Lil Wayne and Snoop Dogg.

G-Eazy's mixtapes at this period of time were met with limited success. In August 2011, he released The Endless Summer, with an updated version of the 1961 hit song "Runaround Sue", which garnered over four million views via YouTube. The music video was directed by Tyler Yee. The mixtape features guest appearances from Greg Banks, Erika Flowers and Devon Baldwin. In November 2011, Gillum embarked on a nationwide tour with Shwayze. "My Life Is a Party" was featured in the game Saints Row: The Third on an in-game radio station.

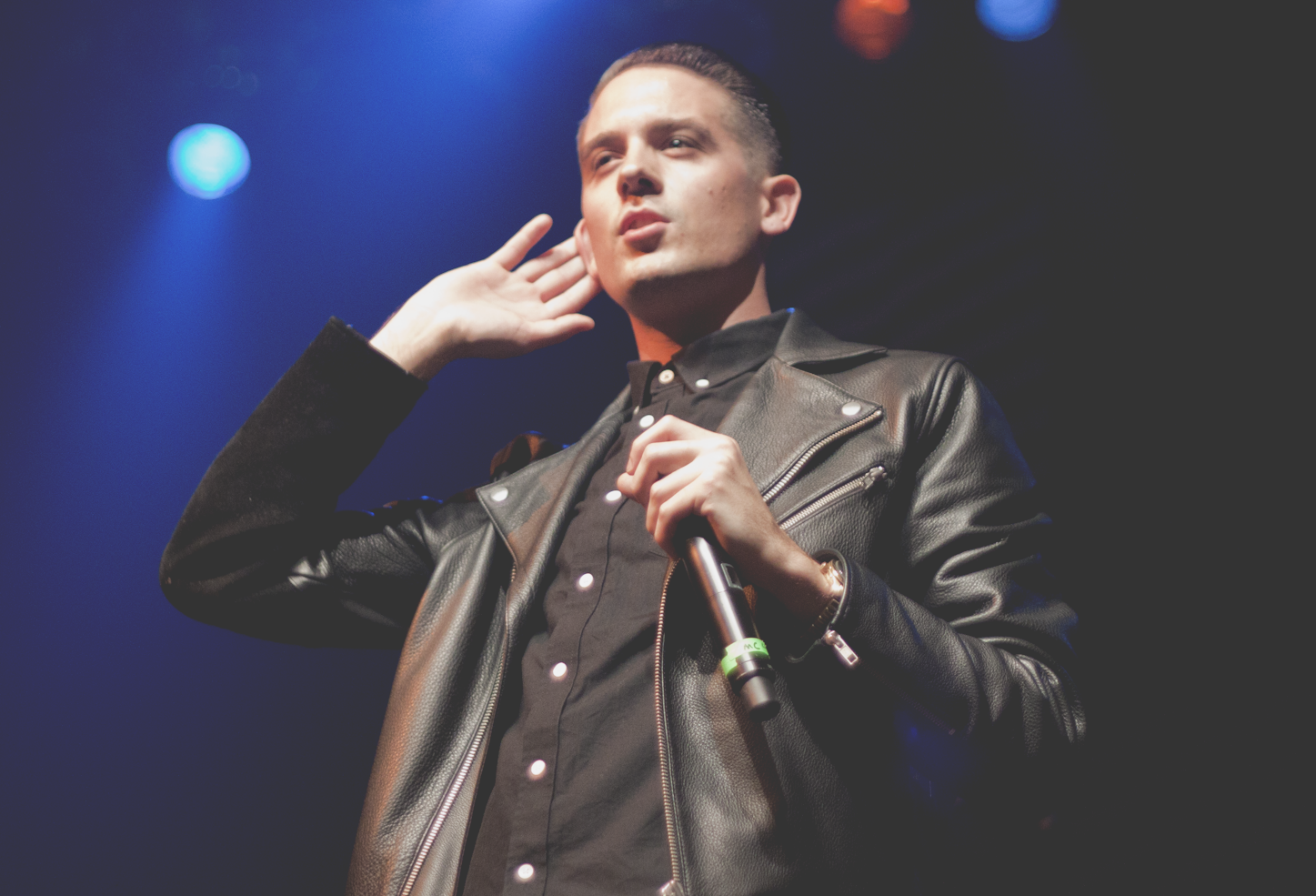
G-Eazy performing in 2013

On June 16, 2012, G-Eazy performed all United States dates on the annual Vans Warped Tour. On July 25, 2012, the Excellent Adventure Tour was announced, which featured Hoodie Allen and G-Eazy. The two performed in cities across the U.S., including Pittsburgh, St. Louis, Columbus, Des Moines, New Orleans, Atlanta, Austin, and Philadelphia. On September 26, 2012, G-Eazy released his first full-length album, Must Be Nice. The album, which was completely independent of a label, landed at number 3 on the iTunes Hip-Hop Chart. On July 9, 2013, G-Eazy, alongside 2 Chainz, opened for Lil Wayne's "America's Most Wanted Tour". On December 15, 2013, G-Eazy and Master Chen B performed "Lotta That" from These Things Happen in New York City. On January 15, 2014, G-Eazy announced his "These Things Happen Tour" with Rockie Fresh, KYLE, and Tory Lanez accompanying him. The tour ran for 40 stops throughout the United States and Canada from February until April 2014.

=== 2014–16: These Things Happen and When It's Dark Out ===
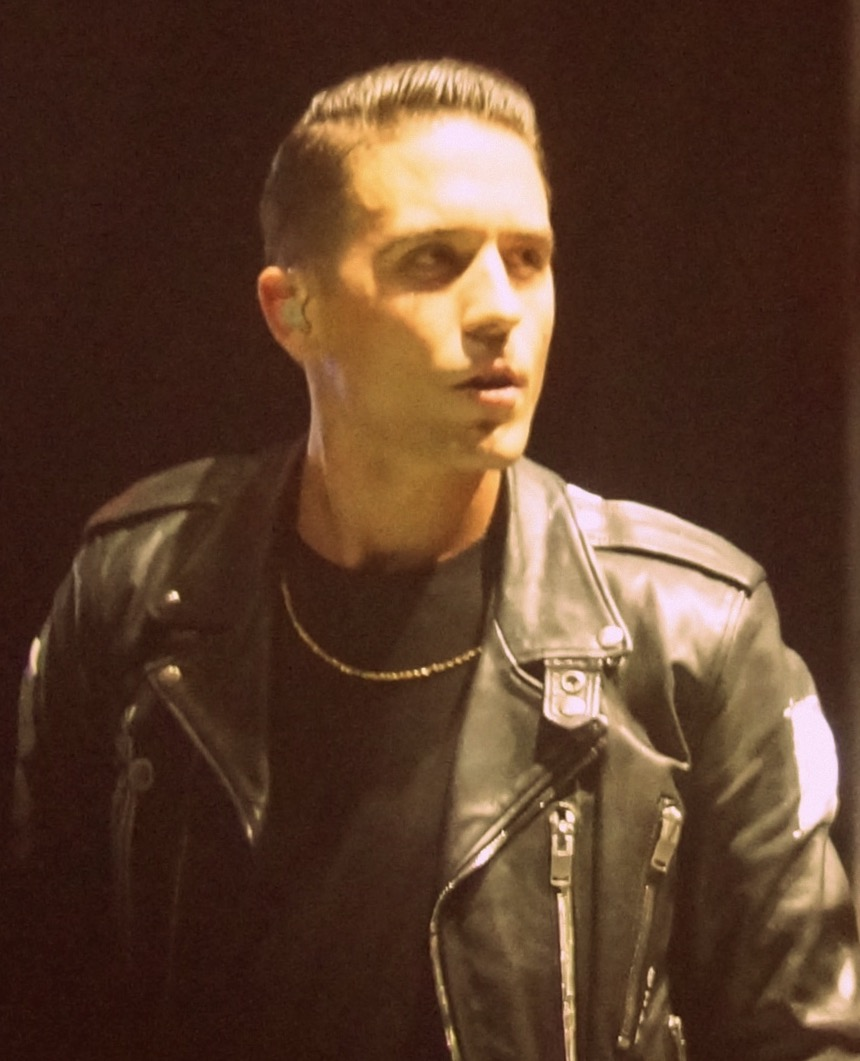
G-Eazy at Lollapalooza in 2015

On June 23, 2014, G-Eazy released his major-label debut album, These Things Happen. The album topped the U.S. Billboard's Hip-Hop/R&B and Top Rap Albums charts, also earning him the number 3 spot on the US Billboard 200 and the Top Digital Albums Chart. The album has sold nearly 265,000 copies to date. On October 21, 2014, Gillum embarked on his sold-out "From the Bay to the Universe" tour. The tour traveled across the globe to countries like Australia and New Zealand. This was his first headlining tour overseas.

During the summer of 2015, G-Eazy played some of the main stages at a series of notable music festivals, including Lollapalooza, Electric Forest, Bonnaroo, Outside Lands, Made in America, and Austin City Limits. With the rise of his music career, Gillum has also taken up in interest in fashion by releasing a collaboration with Rare Panther in the fall of 2015 and being named GQ Magazine's top 10 most stylish at New York Fashion Week. Gillum's second album, When It's Dark Out, was released on December 4, 2015. On January 6, 2016, G-Eazy launched his second world tour. The tour saw G-Eazy tour the United States, Europe, and Australia. His single "Me, Myself & I", in collaboration with Bebe Rexha, peaked at number 7 on the U.S. Billboard Hot 100.

He co-headlined the Endless Summer tour with American rapper Logic, along with YG and Yo Gotti as supporting acts, from June to August. Before the tour, he announced his new mixtape, Endless Summer II. He cancelled the tape due to problems with sample clearance. In May 2016, G-Eazy confirmed that he would be featured on Britney Spears' single "Make Me...". The single was released on July 15, 2016, and serves as the lead single from Spears' ninth studio album.

G-Eazy performed "Make Me..." and "Me, Myself & I" with Spears at the 2016 MTV Video Music Awards and the 2016 iHeartRadio Music Festival.

=== 2017–18: Step Brothers and The Beautiful & Damned ===
Gillum released an EP with Guatemalan DJ Carnage called Step Brothers on March 27, 2017. G-Eazy released his new single, a collaboration with American singer Kehlani called "Good Life", which is a part of the eighth installment of the film franchise Fast & Furious, titled The Fate of the Furious. He was also featured in the new Dillon Francis single titled "Say Less".

On June 14, 2017, G-Eazy announced through Instagram and Twitter that his next studio album, The Beautiful & Damned, would be released in the fall of 2017. On November 8, 2017, the official release day was announced as December 15, as well as an accompanying short film.

On December 5, 2017, G-Eazy released his second single from The Beautiful & Damned titled "Him & I" with Halsey, with whom he was in a relationship. They performed the song together on Dick Clark's New Year's Rockin' Eve of 2017. On February 27, 2019, G-Eazy released the single, "West Coast", featuring Blueface and released the video on March 28, 2019, adding ALLBLACK and YG.

=== 2019–21: Acting debut, B-Sides, Scary Nights, Everything's Strange Here and These Things Happen Too ===
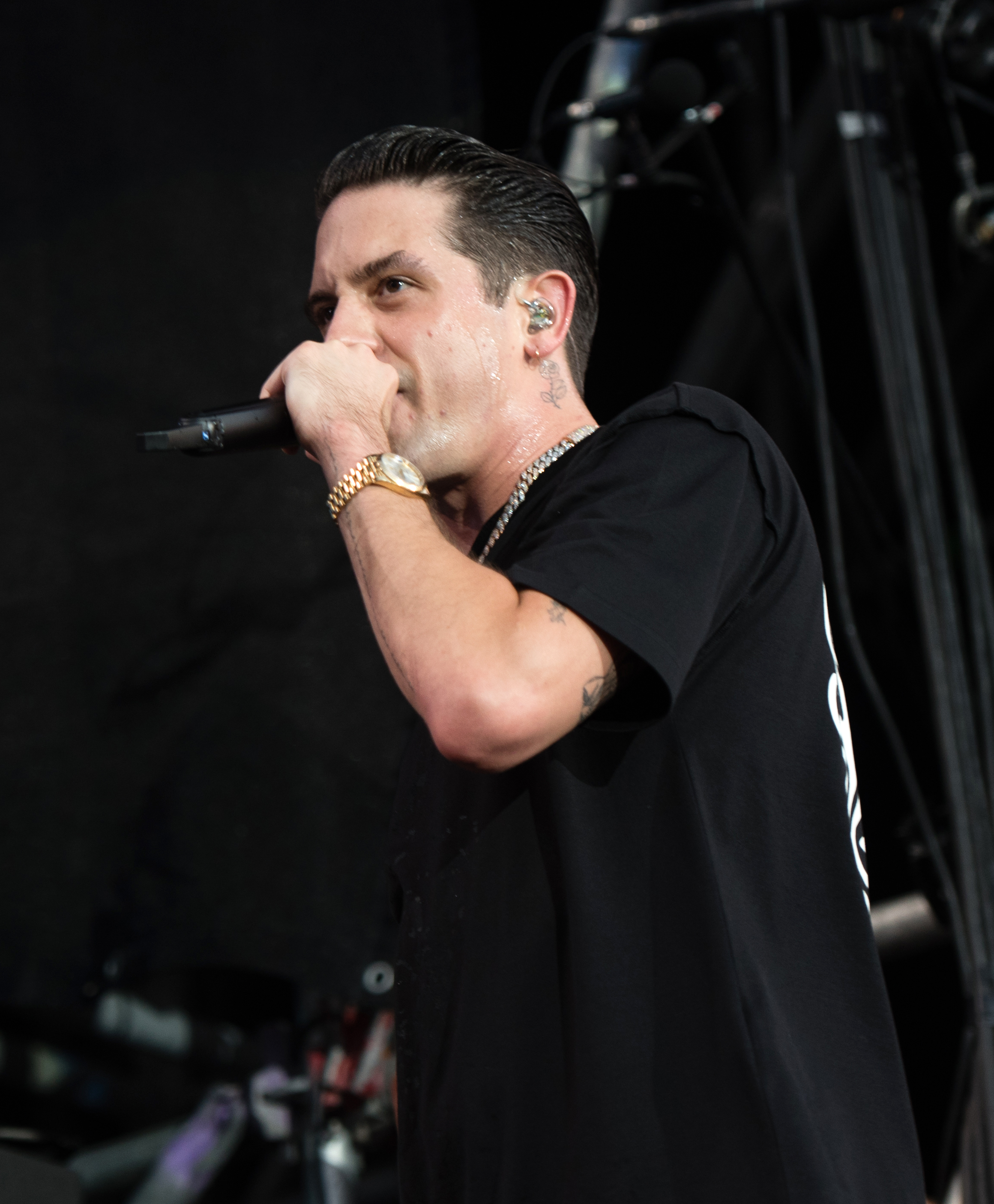
G-Eazy performing at Openair Frauenfeld in 2019

G-Eazy released an EP B-Sides on June 25, 2019, which contained the songs that wouldn't make it onto his then-upcoming album. The EP spawned the song "Bang" with American rapper Tyga. He later re-released the EP on August 22 and September 19 with additional tracks.

He made his acting debut with crime-comedy movie Hustlers, where he played Johnny, released in September 13, 2019.

Gillum released the single "I Wanna Rock", featuring American rapper Gunna, as the lead single of his EP Scary Nights, on October 16. The EP was released on October 18.

In March 2020, G-Eazy announced a new project featuring an indie rock sound titled Everything's Strange Here. The album was officially released on June 26, 2020.

G-Eazy released his long anticipated fourth studio album These Things Happen Too on September 24, 2021. It was supported by the singles "Running Wild (Tumblr Girls 2)" featuring Kossisko, and "Breakdown" featuring Demi Lovato in the weeks leading up to the release date.

=== 2022–present: Freak Show and Helium ===
In April 2022, G-Eazy released the song "Angel" which is a tribute to his mother who died in November 2021.

In March 2023, he released "Tulips and Roses", which is his comeback single after a year of hiatus. G-Eazy appeared in a few interviews over summer 2023 to confirm that his next album will be coming soon.

On April 4, 2024, he released "Femme Fatale" featuring Coi Leray and Kaliii as the lead single to his upcoming seventh studio album Freak Show. On June 6, 2024, he released "Anxiety" as the second single from the album. The album Freak Show was released June 21, 2024.

G-Eazy released his eighth studio album titled Helium on May 23, 2025.

== Philanthropy ==
In 2018, G-Eazy headlined a concert for Bay Area fire relief that raised $15 million, pulled out of a H&M sponsorship deal after blowback about a sweatshirt advertisement that some considered to be racist, performed at an Everytown fundraiser on the eve of March For Our Lives, and used his platform to speak out against gun violence. Also that year, G-Eazy launched the Endless Summer Fund, which is a non-profit dedicated to helping young people reach their full potential and strengthening the Bay Area community.

In 2022, G-Eazy joined the ownership group of professional soccer team Oakland Roots.

== Personal life ==
From 2017 to 2018, G-Eazy was in a highly publicized relationship with singer Halsey. From 2020 to 2021, G-Eazy was in a relationship with actress Ashley Benson.

== Legal issues ==
On May 2, 2018, Gillum was arrested in Stockholm, Sweden on suspicion of assault and possession and use of drugs after he allegedly punched a security guard and was found to have cocaine in his pocket. Gillum pleaded guilty to violent resistance, drug possession, and assault against an official in court on May 4. He was sentenced to probation and ordered to pay a fine of $10,000 and a $900 compensation fee to the security guard he assaulted.

On September 13, 2021, he was arrested and charged with assault in New York City. It was reported that he assaulted two men at the Boom Boom Room at the Standard.

== Discography ==
- The Epidemic LP (2008)
- Must Be Nice (2012)
- These Things Happen (2014)
- When It's Dark Out (2015)
- The Beautiful & Damned (2017)
- These Things Happen Too (2021)
- Freak Show (2024)
- Helium (2025)

== Filmography ==
=== Film ===
Year	Film	Role	Notes	Ref
2019	Hustlers	Johnny	Movie	
2022	Take Me to the River: New Orleans	Himself	Documentary	
2022	We Were Hyphy	Himself	Documentary	
2023	Alone at Night	Tom Montana	Movie	
2023	All Souls	Silas	Antagonist	

=== Television ===
Year	Title	Role	Notes	Ref
2023	Hell's Kitchen	Himself	Chef's table guest diner for the red team; Episode: "All Up in Your Grills"	

== Awards ==
=== MTV Europe Music Awards ===
Year	Nominee / work	Award	Result
2016	G-Eazy	Best Hip-Hop Artist	Nominated

=== iHeartRadio Titanium Award ===
iHeartRadio Titanium Awards are awarded to an artist when their song reaches 1 Billion Spins across iHeartRadio Stations.

Year	Nominee/Work		Result
2018	"Him & I" (with Halsey)	1 Billion Total Audience Spins on iHeartRadio Stations	Won

=== People's Choice Awards ===
Year	Nominee / work	Award	Result
2017	G-Eazy	Favorite Hip-Hop Artist	Won
