= 1979 Nevis Local Council election =

Nevis Local Council election

- December 1979

All 9 elected seats on the Nevis Local Council
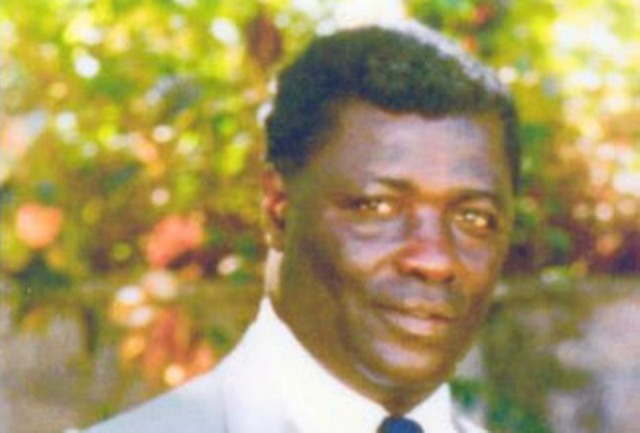
	First party
Leader	Simeon Daniel
Party	NRP
Last election	9 seats
Seats won	9
Seat change	Steady
Popular vote	2,493
Percentage	86.2%
Chairman of the Local Council before election
Simeon Daniel
Nevis Reformation Party
Chairman of
the Local Council after election
Simeon Daniel
Nevis Reformation Party

An election was held for the Nevis Local Council in December 1979. The Nevis Reformation Party (NRP) retained control of the council after again winning all nine seats.

== Background ==
The previous council election in 1975 saw the NRP win all nine seats in an uncontested election, with no other parties standing. Continued calls from the NRP and Nevisians for Nevis' secession from Saint Kitts led to an unofficial referendum being held on the issue in 1977, with the 99.7% vote in favour of secession being unrecognised and rejected by the central government.

In the 1979 local council election, the Saint Kitts-Nevis-Anguilla Labour Party stood candidates against the NRP, which was the only time Labour ever directly contested a local election in Nevis. The election also saw Ermine Queeley run as a Labour candidate, becoming the first woman to ever contest an election for the party.

== Election result ==
Party	Votes	%	Seats
Nevis Reformation Party	2,493	86.23	9
Saint Kitts-Nevis-Anguilla Labour Party	371	12.83	0
Other/invalid	27	0.93	–
Total	2,891	100.00	9
Registered voters/turnout	4,647	–	

The result was a landslide for the NRP, who won all nine seats and strongly defeated Labour, with Labour winning no seats. NRP leader Simeon Daniel continued to serve as Chairman of the Local Council until 1980.
