= List of R&B musicians =

A global, multilingual list of rhythm and blues and contemporary R&B musicians recognized via popular R&B genres as songwriters, instrumentalists, vocalists, mixing engineers, and for musical composition and record production.

Listed bands, groups & individuals "professionally known as", through Pseudonyms are sorted via their 1st stage name letter and ensembles definitively articled "The", rest in T. Performers adhering to legal name and pet-names such as "Donnie<-Donald Klang", "Billy<-William Preston" are surname alphabetized.

List of R&B musicians encompasses sub-genres such as urban-contemporary, doo wop, southern, neo-soul and soul, indie, alternative, country, rap, ska, funk, pop, rock, electronic and new jack swing fusions. Criteria for list inclusion is citation or article basis infobox mention of: Rhythm & Blues or listed sub-genres, engineers and producers require album credits residing in any relevant artists articles.

== Numbers ==
- 1 Of The Girls
- 112
- 15&
- 24hrs
- 2nd Nature
- 2Rude
- 3rd Storee
- 3LW
- 30 Roc
- 3T
- 4 P.M.
- 40
- 5 After Midnight
- 6lack
- 702
- 7669
- 98 Degrees

== A ==
- Aaliyah
- Aaradhna
- Gregory Abbott
- Paula Abdul
- Tyler Acord
- Adeaze
- Adele
- Adrian Daniel
- Afrodiziac
- After 7
- Agnez Mo
- Christina Aguilera
- Ai
- Ailee
- AJ Mitchell
- Jin Akanishi
- Akon
- Al B. Sure!
- Alex Aiono
- All-4-One
- Allie
- All Saints
- Allure
- Aloe Blacc
- Herb Alpert
- August Alsina
- Marsha Ambrosius
- Amel Bent
- Amerie
- Aminé
- Namie Amuro
- Anderson East
- Anderson .Paak
- Sunshine Anderson
- Andra Day
- André 3000
- Angel
- Anggun
- Angie Stone
- Ann Marie
- Ann Nesby
- Another Bad Creation
- Anquette
- Tafari Anthony
- Aquakultre
- Archie Bell & the Drells
- Arlo Parks
- Steve Arrington
- James Arthur
- Artists Stand Up to Cancer
- Ashanti
- Ashford & Simpson
- Asia Cruise
- Asiahn
- As One
- Assia
- Aswad
- ATL
- Atlantic Starr
- Auburn
- August Rigo
- Aurra
- Johntá Austin
- Avant
- Avery Storm
- AverySunshine
- Aya Nakamura
- Mac Ayres
- Ayushita
- Az Yet
- Aziatix

== B ==
- B2K
- B5
- Baby Bash
- Babyface
- Babylon
- Backstreet Boys
- Bad Rabbits
- Erykah Badu
- Baekhyun
- Halle Bailey
- Philip Bailey
- Anita Baker
- LaVern Baker
- Florence Ballard
- Banks
- Banky W.
- Alina Baraz
- Jimmy Barnes
- Richie Barrett
- Bass is Base
- Bazzi
- bbno$
- Gary Beals
- Becky G
- Natasha Bedingfield
- Madison Beer
- Before Dark
- Bella Alubo
- Bell Biv DeVoe
- Melissa Bell
- Thom Bell
- Regina Belle
- Ricky Bell
- Eric Bellinger
- Jon Bellion
- Korede Bello
- Belly
- Paris Bennett
- Rhona Bennett
- George Benson
- Chuck Berry
- Berwyn
- Betty Wright
- Shannon Bex
- Beyoncé
- Jeff Bhasker
- B.I
- Bianka
- Bibi
- Justin Bieber
- Big Black Lincoln
- Big Brovaz
- Big Reese
- Bigg D
- Big Joe Turner
- Billy Ocean
- Billy Paul
- Billy Ward and his Dominoes
- BJ the Chicago Kid
- Bkorn
- Black Atlass
- Blackbear
- BlackGirl
- Blackstreet
- Michael Bland
- Mary J. Blige
- Black Buddafly
- Black M
- Bladee
- Bobby "Blue" Bland
- Blaque
- Tanya Blount
- Blue
- Jasën Blu
- Blu Cantrell
- Blue Magic
- Blxst
- BoA
- Bobby Taylor & the Vancouvers
- Bobby V
- Bob Marley and the Wailers
- Bo Diddley
- Hamilton Bohannon
- Boi-1da
- Angela Bofill
- Tyra Bolling
- Boney James
- Boney M.
- Booker T. & the M.G.'s
- Boots
- Bootsy Collins
- Jesse Boykins III
- Boyz II Men
- V. Bozeman
- Brainstorm
- Bramsito
- Brandy
- Tamar Braxton
- Toni Braxton
- Bree Runway
- Breland
- Jackie Brenston
- Brent Faiyaz
- Brick
- Frankie Bridge
- Brighter Side of Darkness
- Brockhampton
- Ally Brooke
- Brother Su
- Trina Broussard
- Bobby Brown
- Chris Brown
- Divine Brown
- Horace Brown
- James Brown
- Kane Brown
- Roy Brown
- Ruth Brown
- Shirley Brown
- Brownstone
- Brooke Valentine
- Bruno Mars
- Brutha
- Breyan Isaac
- Brymo
- B. Smyth
- BTS
- Buddy
- Bumkey
- Alexandra Burke
- Kandi Burruss
- Jerry Butler
- Bobby Byrd

== C ==
- Athena Cage
- Bobby Caldwell
- Cameo
- G. C. Cameron
- Tevin Campbell
- Warryn Campbell
- Capella Grey
- Alessia Cara
- Mariah Carey
- Carl Carlton
- Jean Carne
- Sabrina Carpenter
- Wynona Carr
- Grace Carter
- Blue Ivy Carter
- Case
- Cashmere Cat
- Cassie
- Léa Castel
- JR Castro
- Demo Cates
- Cazzu
- CeeLo Green
- Celeste
- Ceraadi
- Cha Cha Malone
- Chad Focus
- Chaka Khan
- Chance the Rapper
- Chancellor
- Change
- Changing Faces
- Channel 7
- Nija Charles
- Ray Charles
- Tanika Charles
- Judy Cheeks
- Cherish
- Che'Nelle
- Cherrelle
- Cheryl
- Cody Chesnutt
- Chic
- Chico DeBarge
- Chika (rapper)
- Chiiild
- Childish Gambino
- Chilla
- Chin Injeti
- Chloe x Halle
- Chlöe
- Jay Chou
- Chrisette Michele
- Christión
- Chuck Willis
- Ciara
- Alex Clare
- Gary Clark Jr.
- Classic Example
- Sabrina Claudio
- Cleopatra
- George Clinton
- Club Nouveau
- Coco Jones
- Amber Coffman
- Coko
- Keyshia Cole
- Natalie Cole
- Jacob Collier
- Bootsy Collins
- Tyler Collins
- Javier Colon
- Colonel Abrams
- Color Me Badd
- Coming of Age
- Commodores
- Con Funk Shun
- Connie Constance
- La Forrest 'La La' Cope
- Corneille
- Countess Vaughn
- Bryan-Michael Cox
- Deborah Cox
- Nadine Coyle
- Joy Crookes
- Steve Cropper
- Crush
- Crystal Kay
- Brian Culbertson
- Cupid
- Cymphonique

== D ==
- Dadju
- Dallas Austin
- D'Angelo
- Damage
- Damian Dame
- Daniel Caesar
- DaniLeigh
- Danity Kane
- Danja
- Dappy
- Dava
- Craig David
- Davido
- David Tao
- Davina
- Billy Newton-Davis
- N'Dea Davenport
- Morris Day
- Day26
- Dazz Band
- Mike Dean
- Paula DeAnda
- Dear Jayne
- DeBarge
- El DeBarge
- Dee Dee Sharp
- Dalvin DeGrate
- DaniLeigh
- Dej Loaf
- De La Ghetto
- Delilah
- Kat DeLuna
- Cheri Dennis
- Deno
- Dewi Sandra
- Deniece Williams
- Cheri Dennis
- Deno
- Jason Derulo
- Destiny's Child
- Detail
- Raheem DeVaughn
- Devvon Terrell
- Sam Dew
- Dewi Sandra
- Terry Dexter
- Diggy Simmons
- Dinah Jane
- Dirty Money
- Divine
- DJ Abdel
- DJ Clue
- DJ Envy
- DJ Montay
- Alesha Dixon
- Doe Paoro
- Bill Doggett
- Doja Cat
- Dondria
- Donna Summer
- Don Toliver
- Will Downing
- Lamont Dozier
- Drake
- Dream
- Dreezy
- Dre & Vidal
- Drew Sidora
- Dr. Freeze
- DRS
- Dru Hill
- Duckwrth
- George Duke
- Duncan Mighty
- Duncan Sheik
- Melanie Durrant
- Dusty Springfield
- Dvsn
- Dwele
- Ronnie Dyson

== E ==
- Eamon
- Easy Life
- Earth, Wind & Fire
- Gerald Eaton
- Kevon Edmonds
- Mathieu Edward
- Electrik Red
- Elise Estrada
- Ella Mai
- Elle Varner
- Missy Elliott
- Terry Ellis
- Elo
- Elusion
- Elvana
- Emanuel
- Emeli Sandé
- Empress Of
- Erroll Starr
- En Vogue
- Enchantment
- Entouch
- Eric Benét
- Loick Essien
- Estelle
- Esthero
- Eternal
- Etta James
- Faith Evans
- Tiffany Evans
- Ex Girlfriend
- Exile
- Exo

== F ==
- Fally Ipupa
- Fantasia
- Kenza Farah
- Dionne Farris
- Fats Domino
- James Fauntleroy
- Fergie
- Rebecca Ferguson
- Danny Fernandes
- Fierce
- Fifth Harmony
- Dominique Fils-Aimé
- Aundrea Fimbres
- First Choice
- Lisa Fischer
- Steve Fitzmaurice
- Five Star
- Frank Hooker & Positive People
- FKA Twigs
- Roberta Flack
- Warren Dean Flandez
- Floetry
- Flyte Tyme
- Force MDs
- Penny Ford
- For Real
- David Foster
- Four Tops
- Francis and the Lights
- Franglish
- Frankee
- Frankie J
- Frankie Lymon & the Teenagers
- Aretha Franklin
- Farrah Franklin
- Four of Diamonds
- Fugees
- Full Force
- Fun-Da-Mental
- Future
- Khalil Fong

== G ==
- James Gadson
- Yvonne Gage
- Rosie Gaines
- Galactic
- Gallant
- David Garibaldi
- Clarence Garlow
- Kevin Garrett
- Gatemouth
- Ali Gatie
- Tiffany Gouché
- Gene Chandler
- Geraldine Hunt
- Tyrese Gibson
- Johnny Gill
- Gims
- Ginuwine
- Gio Washington
- Girlicious
- Git Fresh
- Giveon
- Gladys Knight & the Pips
- Gloria Gaynor
- Robert Glasper
- Jess Glynne
- G.NA
- Gnash
- Goapele
- GoldLink
- Diana Gordon
- Got7
- Noel Gourdin
- Rosco Gordon
- Jaki Graham
- Ariana Grande
- Macy Gray
- Al Green
- Byrdie Green
- Layton Greene
- Vivian Green
- Grenique
- Groove Theory
- Guy
- Jasmine Guy
- Gwen Guthrie

== H ==
- Hadise
- Nick Hakim
- Aaron Hall
- Ellis Hall
- Hall & Oates
- Hank Ballard
- Hank Ballard & The Midnighters
- Anthony Hamilton
- Happy Perez
- Karen Harding
- Har Mar Superstar
- Kalenna Harper
- Wynonie Harris
- Rich Harrison
- Sinéad Harnett
- Harold Lilly
- Harold Melvin & the Blue Notes
- Kalenna Harper
- Donny Hathaway
- Lalah Hathaway
- Isaac Hayes
- Leon Haywood
- Heather Headley
- Heatwave
- Heavy D & the Boyz
- Heize
- Carl Henry
- Henry Santos
- H.E.R.
- Max Herre
- Hi-Five
- Becky Hill
- Dan Hill
- Kacy Hill
- Keri Hilson
- Hiro
- Hit-Boy
- Brian Holland
- Holland–Dozier–Holland
- Jennifer Holliday
- Dave Hollister
- Honey Cone
- Honeyz
- Honne
- Hoody
- H-Town
- Houston
- Cissy Houston
- Marques Houston
- Matt Houston
- Thelma Houston
- Whitney Houston
- Miki Howard
- Hozier
- Hrvy
- Elva Hsiao
- Vanessa Hudgens
- Jennifer Hudson
- Leroy Hutson
- Phyllis Hyman
- Tish Hyman
- Dev Hynes

== I ==
- Ibeyi
- Zaki Ibrahim
- Ideal
- Idris
- IceJJFish
- II D Extreme
- iLoveMakonnen
- ILYA
- Imagination
- Imajin
- Imen Es
- IMx
- India Arie
- James Ingram
- Intro
- Seo In-young
- Ironik
- Irv Gotti
- Alex Isley
- Era Istrefi
- IU
- Iyanya
- Iyaz

== J ==
- Jack & Jack
- Freddie Jackson
- Jackie Jackson
- Janet Jackson
- Jermaine Jackson
- Keisha Jackson
- La Toya Jackson
- Marlon Jackson
- Michael Jackson
- Millie Jackson
- Randy Jackson
- Rebbie Jackson
- Tito Jackson
- Trevor Jackson
- jacksoul
- Jacquees
- Jada
- Jade
- Jagged Edge
- Jaguar Wright
- Jaheim
- Jake and the Phatman
- Jalane
- Jamelia
- James Blake
- Jamie
- Jamiroquai
- Jam & Lewis
- Jana
- Jane Child
- Janelle Monáe
- Al Jarreau
- Jasmine V
- Jay Sean
- Jazze Pha
- Jazzyfatnastees
- Wyclef Jean
- Ceybil Jefferies
- Jeremih
- Jeremy Jordan
- Jermaine Dupri
- Jerry Leiber and Mike Stoller
- Jessie J
- Jewell
- Jhay Cortez
- Jhené Aiko
- J. Holiday
- Ralph Johnson
- J.I the Prince of N.Y
- Jim Jonsin
- Park Jin-young
- JLS
- JMSN
- Jodeci
- Joe
- Joé Dwèt Filé
- Joey Lawrence
- Johan Kim
- John Givez
- Kim Johnson
- Syl Johnson
- Syleena Johnson
- Joi
- Joji
- JoJo
- Jomanda
- Joe Jonas
- Nick Jonas
- Joe Public
- Joe Tex
- Jon B.
- Jonell
- Jones
- Donell Jones
- Glenn Jones
- Grace Jones
- Miss Jones
- Oran "Juice" Jones
- Quincy Jones
- Senator Jones
- Shae Jones
- Kim Jong-hyun
- Jonn Hart
- Alexis Jordan
- Louis Jordan
- Majid Jordan
- Montell Jordan
- Rochelle Jordan
- Jordin Sparks
- Jorja Smith
- Jaycen Joshua
- Joss Stone
- Joya
- JRDN
- J'Son
- Julia Michaels
- Jully Black
- Rayven Justice
- Justine Skye
- J. Valentine
- Jvck James

== K ==
- KABBA
- Kae Sun
- Kai
- Adria Kain
- Kali Uchis
- Kallitechnis
- Kamaiyah
- Kamauu
- Kamille
- Arika Kane
- Danity Kane
- Karl Wolf
- Kashif
- Kat Dahlia
- KayCyy
- Kayliah
- Kaytranada
- K Camp
- K-Ci & JoJo
- Kehlani
- Kelis
- Bridget Kelly
- Claude Kelly
- Kelli-Leigh
- R. Kelly
- Tori Kelly
- Kem
- Johnny Kemp
- Tara Kemp
- Eddie Kendricks
- Kent Jones
- Kenny Beats
- Kevin Abstract
- Kevin Michael
- Alicia Keys
- Khalid
- Khalil
- Imran Khan
- Kiana Ledé
- Kid 'n Play
- Kid Ink
- Kieran
- Kiesza
- Kiiara
- Debra Killings
- Kimbra
- Ben E. King
- Evelyn "Champagne" King
- Sean Kingston
- KIRBY
- Mike James Kirkland
- Kirko Bangz
- K'Jon
- Donnie Klang
- Klymaxx
- K'Jon
- Kindred the Family Soul
- Gladys Knight
- KO
- Koda Kumi
- Kokane
- Kool & the Gang
- Kossisko
- K.P. & Envyi
- K-Reen
- Kris Wu
- Kut Klose
- Kwamé
- Kyle

== L ==
- Labelle
- Patti LaBelle
- Labrinth
- Steve Lacy
- Lady Donli
- Lady Wray
- Lakeside
- Lamont Sincere
- La'Porsha Renae
- Amel Larrieux
- Latif
- Jacob Latimore
- Laurneá
- Lauv
- Billy Lawrence
- Leah LaBelle
- Kenny Lattimore
- Kiana Ledé
- Ledisi
- Lee Fields
- Lee Hi
- Leela James
- John Legend
- Lemar
- Lena Park
- Ari Lennox
- LeriQ
- Leslie
- Leslie Grace
- Ryan Leslie
- Les Nubians
- LeVert
- Gerald Levert
- Glenn Lewis
- Leona Lewis
- SG Lewis
- Lexie Liu
- Joe Liggins
- Lil Duval
- Lil' Fizz
- Lil Tjay
- Lil' Eddie
- Lil Mama
- Lil' Mo
- Lisa Lisa and Cult Jam
- Little Anthony and the Imperials
- Little Eva
- Little Mix
- Little Richard
- Lil' Ronnie
- Little Willie John
- Lil Zay Osama
- Like
- Lipps Inc.
- Lizzo
- Lloyd
- Cher Lloyd
- Lo-Key?
- Lolo Zouaï
- LaToya London
- J. Long
- Keiynan Lonsdale
- Loony
- Loose Ends
- Jennifer Lopez
- Pixie Lott
- Lous and the Yakuza
- Demi Lovato
- Love and Sas
- Love Unlimited
- LovHer
- LS
- LSG
- L.T.D.
- LeToya Luckett
- Lu Kala
- Luck Mervil
- Lucky Daye
- Lucy Pearl
- Luh Kel
- Luis Fonsi
- Luke and Q
- Luke James
- Lumidee
- LunchMoney Lewis
- L.V.
- Lyfe Jennings
- Frankie Lymon
- Lynda Laurence
- Cheryl Lynn
- Lyric
- Lyrics Born

== M ==
- Mabel
- Mac Miller
- Madcon
- Maejor Ali
- Mahalia
- Austin Mahone
- Sheila Majid
- MAJOR.
- Bruno Major
- Mali Music
- Mamamoo
- Mansionz
- Emi Maria
- Mario
- Amber Mark
- Marc E. Bassy
- Mariah the Scientist
- Ky-Mani Marley
- Martha and the Vandellas
- Andrea Martin
- Marvin Gaye
- Marvin Priest
- Marwa Loud
- Mary Jane Girls
- Mary Mary
- Masego
- Mashonda
- Massari
- Mateo
- Herman Matthews
- Matt Martians
- Ivan Matias
- Jessica Mauboy
- Maverick Sabre
- Maxwell
- Maysa
- Curtis Mayfield
- May J.
- Conor Maynard
- Maze
- Kevin McCall
- Jesse McCartney
- McClain Sisters
- Thomas McClary
- Kevin McCall
- Michael McDonald
- McFadden & Whitehead
- Jay W. McGee
- Edna McGriff
- Kevin McHale
- Brian McKnight
- MC Magic
- Zena McNally
- Vanessa Mdee
- Medina
- Melanie Fiona
- Melba Moore
- Melgroove
- Men at Large
- Bridgit Mendler
- Men of Vizion
- Mereba
- Meshell Ndegeocello
- Metro Boomin
- MFSB
- Miach
- Mica Paris
- Michel'le
- K.Michelle
- Midnight Star
- Miguel
- Mila J
- Amos Milburn
- Miles Jaye
- Christina Milian
- Milira
- Miliyah Kato
- Amos Milburn
- Jake Miller
- Jamie Miller
- Stephanie Mills
- Mindless Behavior
- Minnie Riperton
- Mint Condition
- Mirae
- Misia
- Mishon
- Missez
- Miss Jones
- Mis-Teeq
- Mista
- Mitchelle'l
- Daichi Miura
- MK
- MNEK
- Mokenstef
- Mona Lisa
- Victoria Monét
- Monica
- Monifah
- Monsieur Nov
- Monsta X
- M.O
- Moonbyul
- Moonchild Sanelly
- Chanté Moore
- Rene Moore
- Tina Moore
- Carlos Morgan
- Meli'sa Morgan
- Mark Morrison
- PJ Morton
- Teedra Moses
- Morris Pleasure
- M. Pokora
- Mr Hudson
- Mtume
- Samantha Mumba
- Muni Long
- Eddie Murphy
- Muroki
- Muscle Shoals Rhythm Section
- Musical Youth
- Musiq Soulchild
- Mustard
- MXM
- Laura Mvula
- Mýa

== N ==
- Nâdiya
- Najee
- Mika Nakashima
- Eric Nam
- Nao
- Nasri
- Natalie
- Nate Dogg
- Nat King Cole
- Natti Natasha
- Naturi Naughton
- NCT
- N-Dubz
- Needa S.
- Nelly
- Phyllis Nelson
- Ann Nesby
- Aaron Neville
- Cyril Neville
- Ivan Neville
- New Birth
- New Edition
- New Kids on the Block
- Next
- Ne-Yo
- N II U
- Niki
- Nikki & Rich
- Nikolai Noskov
- Nikolija
- Nina Simone
- Nina Sky
- Kana Nishino
- Asia Nitollano
- Nivea
- Julia Nixon
- NLT
- Normani
- No Rome
- Not3s
- George Nozuka
- Justin Nozuka
- NSYNC
- N-Toon
- N-Tyce
- Nuela Charles
- Nu Shooz
- Nuttin' Nyce
- Nyusha

== O ==
- Obiwon
- O'Bryan
- Ocean's 7
- Frank Ocean
- Aubrey O'Day
- Odd Future
- OG Parker
- Ohio Players
- Iyeoka Okoawo
- Ol' Skool
- One Chance
- Rita Ora
- Jeannie Ortega
- Claudette Ortiz
- Olivia
- Olly Alexander
- Omah Lay
- Omarion
- Omawumi
- Omen
- OMG Girlz
- Alexander O'Neal
- One Way
- Organized Noize
- O'Ryan
- Jeffrey Osborne
- Joan Osborne
- Out of Eden
- Outlandish

== P ==
- Jahkoy Palmer
- Will Pan
- Parichay
- Jay Park
- Robert Parker
- Parliament
- Parliament-Funkadelic
- PartyNextDoor
- Karina Pasian
- Rahsaan Patterson
- Paulini
- Freda Payne
- Peabo Bryson
- Peaches & Herb
- Pebbles
- Teddy Pendergrass
- CeCe Peniston
- Amanda Perez
- Perfect Gentlemen
- Freddie Perren
- Peter Andre
- Phonte
- Pia Mia
- Piano Red
- Lenny Pickett
- Wilson Pickett
- P!nk
- Pink Sweat$
- Playa
- Pleasure P
- P.M. Dawn
- PnB Rock
- Polo G
- Poo Bear
- Pop Smoke
- Portrait
- Mike Posner
- Jesse Powell
- Elvis Presley
- Billy Preston
- PrettyMuch
- Pretty Ricky
- Kelly Price
- Lloyd Price
- Primary
- Prince
- Prince Paul
- Prince Royce
- Professor Longhair
- Professor RJ Ross
- Profyle
- Arthur Prysock
- Public Announcement
- Puff Daddy
- Zonnique Pullins
- Bernard "Pretty" Purdie
- Pure Soul

== Q ==
- Queen Latifah
- Queen Naija
- QUIÑ
- Qveen Herby

== R ==
- Raab
- Corinne Bailey Rae
- Rahki
- Rag'n'Bone Man
- Raleigh Ritchie
- Randy Crawford
- Randy Jackson
- Raphael Saadiq
- Rashad Smith
- Raury
- Rauw Alejandro
- RaVaughn
- Raven-Symoné
- Ravyn Lenae
- Lou Rawls
- Ray BLK
- Raye
- Ray J
- Allan Rayman
- Ravyn Lenae
- Ready for the World
- Jeff Redd
- Otis Redding
- Louise Redknapp
- Natina Reed
- Reel Tight
- Rejjie Snow
- Rell
- Rels B
- René & Angela
- René Moore
- Res
- Jessie Reyez
- Sheldon Reynolds
- Rhye
- Rhyze
- Ricco Barrino
- Dawn Richard
- Calvin Richardson
- RichGirl
- Rich Kidz
- Lionel Richie
- Rick James
- Rico Love
- Riff
- Rihanna
- Cheryl Pepsii Riley
- Minnie Riperton
- Riri
- Rishi Rich
- River Tiber
- R. Kelly
- R.K.M & Ken-Y
- RL
- Eric Roberson
- LaTavia Roberson
- Robin S.
- Sylvia Robinson
- Vicki Sue Robinson
- Megan Rochell
- Rockwell
- Carmen Rodgers
- Nile Rodgers
- Bahja Rodriguez
- Rod Wave
- Ro James
- Rome
- Ronisia
- Mark Ronson
- Diana Ross
- Rossa
- Rotimi
- Kelly Rowland
- Roy Woods
- Darius Rucker
- David Ruffin
- Rufus
- Runtown
- Patrice Rushen
- Russ
- Brenda Russell
- Ruth B.
- Rythm Syndicate

== S ==
- Sabi
- Sade
- Sade Adu
- Sa-Deuce
- SahBabii
- Saint Jhn
- Salaam Remi
- Saleka
- Samantha Jade
- Sam Dew
- Sam & Dave
- Sam Cooke
- Samm Henshaw
- Kayna Samet
- Sammie
- Sam Salter
- Samsaya
- Sam Sparro
- Samuelle
- Jessica Sanchez
- Emeli Sandé
- Sango
- Ivana Santilli
- Lenny Santos
- Romeo Santos
- Chantay Savage
- Tiwa Savage
- Savannah Ré
- Rina Sawayama
- Harvey Scales
- Scarypoolparty
- Nicole Scherzinger
- Melissa Schuman
- Gil Scott-Heron
- Freddie Scott
- Jill Scott
- Kimberly Scott
- Tony Scott
- Seal
- Reggie Sears
- Guy Sebastian
- Sech
- Seohyun
- Selena
- Samuel Seo
- Selah Sue
- Seungri
- Seven
- Seventeen
- Sevyn Streeter
- Shai
- Shalamar
- Remy Shand
- Jackie Shane
- Shanell
- Shanice
- Shannon
- Shareefa
- Sharissa
- Sharon Jones & the Dap-Kings
- Sheila E.
- Shekhinah
- Shelley FKA DRAM
- Sheryfa Luna
- Shinee
- Shirley & Lee
- Shock G
- Shontelle
- Shy'm
- Sugababes
- Shota Shimizu
- Sidhu Moose Wala
- Siedah Garrett
- Sik-K
- Silk
- Silk Sonic
- Liberty Silver
- Simbi Khali
- Verse Simmonds
- Sterling Simms
- Special Delivery
- Tika Simone
- Joe Simon
- Cody Simpson
- Jessica Simpson
- Dylan Sinclair
- Singuila
- SiR
- Sisqó
- Sistars
- Sister Sledge
- Sjava
- Skales
- Skinnyman
- Skyy
- Percy Sledge
- Sleepy Brown
- Slim
- Sly and the Family Stone
- Smino
- Jaden Smith
- Jorja Smith
- Lorenzo Smith
- Patrick "J. Que" Smith
- Sam Smith
- Sy Smith
- Will Smith
- Willow Smith
- Smokey Robinson
- Jussie Smollett
- Smooth
- Snakehips
- Snoh Aalegra
- Snow Tha Product
- Solange
- Solo
- Solomon Burke
- Somethin' for the People
- Sons of Champlin
- Sons of Funk
- So Plush
- Souf
- Soul for Real
- Soul II Soul
- Sounds of Blackness
- Sound Sultan
- Bobby Sowell
- Sparkle
- Jordin Sparks
- Tracie Spencer
- Stacy
- Stacy Lattisaw
- Antwaun Stanley
- Lisa Stansfield
- Stargate
- Starpoint
- Starshell
- Candi Staton
- Skylar Stecker
- Stefflon Don
- Dani Stevenson
- Kris Stephens
- Stevie J
- Stevie Wonder
- Amii Stewart
- Still Fresh
- Storry
- Stress
- Ruben Studdard
- Allen Su
- Subway
- Suga
- Sugababes
- Sugar Jones
- Jazmine Sullivan
- Sun
- Sunday Service Choir
- Super Junior
- SURAN
- Surface
- Keith Sweat
- Sweetback
- Switch
- SWV
- S-X
- Sybil
- Syd
- Nathan Sykes
- Sylk-E. Fyne
- Sylvester
- Sylvia Striplin
- SZA

== T ==
- Taeyang
- Taeyeon
- Take 6
- Tamia
- Tammi Terrell
- Tank
- Taio Cruz
- Taurus
- Tavares
- Tayc
- Tay Iwar
- J.T. Taylor
- Johnnie Taylor
- Teyana Taylor
- Willie Taylor
- Teairra Marí
- Teddy Swims
- TeeFlii
- Teena Marie
- Tellaman
- Tekno
- Tems
- Terri & Monica
- Tony Terry
- Tha' Rayne
- The Animals
- The Bar-Kays
- The Brothers Johnson
- The Cadillacs
- The Carters
- The Chantels
- The Chi-Lites
- The Clutch
- The Coasters
- The Cookies
- The Crystals
- The Delfonics
- The Dells
- The D.E.Y.
- The Dramatics
- The-Dream
- The Drifters
- The Dubs
- The Emotions
- The Essex
- The Exciters
- The Famous Flames
- The 5th Dimension
- The "5" Royales
- The Flirtations
- The Floaters
- The Foreign Exchange
- The Funk Brothers
- The Gap Band
- The Hues Corporation
- The Impressions
- The Internet
- The Intruders
- The Isley Brothers
- The Jackson 5
- The J.B.'s
- The Jets
- The Jones Girls
- The Lovelites
- The Mac Band
- The Manhattans
- The Marvelettes
- The Messengers
- The Miracles
- The Meters
- The Moody Blues
- The Moonglows
- The Neptunes
- The Neville Brothers
- The O'Jays
- The Orioles
- The Philosopher Kings
- The Platters
- The Pointer Sisters
- The Pussycat Dolls
- The Raelettes
- The Ravens
- The Ronettes
- The Rude Boys
- The Sequence
- The Shirelles
- The Sisters Love
- The Slakadeliqs
- The Spaniels
- The Spencer Davis Group
- The Spinners
- The Staple Singers
- The Stylistics
- The S.O.S. Band
- The Soultronics
- The Supremes
- The Sylvers
- The Temprees
- The Three Degrees
- The Time
- The Trammps
- The Treniers
- The Tymes
- The Valentines
- The Weeknd
- The Whispers
- The Winans
- The Wrecking Crew
- Them
- They
- Robin Thicke
- Carl Thomas
- Carla Thomas
- Irma Thomas
- Rufus Thomas
- Tiara Thomas
- Gina Thompson
- Tony Thompson
- Thundercat
- Tiana Major9
- Bryson Tiller
- Timati
- Justin Timberlake
- Tinashe
- Tina Turner
- Tink
- Tinchy Stryder
- Titiyo
- TLC
- TG4
- TGT
- TM88
- Toby Gad
- Toby Love
- Today
- Tommy & the Tom Toms
- Tony Rich
- Tony! Toni! Toné!
- Toosii
- Tory Lanez
- Total
- Allen Toussaint
- Tower of Power
- Toya
- T-Pain
- TQ
- Trackmasters
- Ralph Tresvant
- Trevor Daniel
- Trey Songz
- Tribal Jam
- Tricky Stewart
- Trin-i-tee 5:7
- Troop
- Roger Troutman
- Troye Sivan
- Truth Hurts
- Tulisa
- Ike Turner
- Kreesha Turner
- Tweet
- twlv
- Tyla
- Tyler Carter
- Tynisha Keli

== U ==
- Ugly Duck
- Umi
- Uncle Sam
- U.N.V.
- Urban Mystic
- Usher
- Hikaru Utada

== V ==
- Vachirawit Chivaaree
- Vanity 6
- Vanity
- Luther Vandross
- Van Morrison
- Mario Vazquez
- Vegedream
- Velous
- Vibe
- Village People
- Tiffany Villarreal
- Jon Vinyl
- Vitaa
- Jasmine V
- Voices
- Voices of Theory
- Vory
- Vulfpeck

== W ==
- Wang Leehom
- David T. Walker
- Summer Walker
- Tay Walker
- Wallen
- Teddy Walton
- Wande Coal
- Dexter Wansel
- War
- Anita Ward
- Jessie Ware
- Dionne Warwick
- Wash
- Martha Wash
- Gio Washington
- Keith Washington
- Oren Waters
- Tionne Watkins
- Jody Watley
- Johnny "Guitar" Watson
- Barbara Weathers
- Jason Weaver
- Wejdene
- Mary Wells
- Kanye West
- Tierra Whack
- Kim Weston
- Caron Wheeler
- Wheesung
- Whistle
- Whitehead Bros.
- Barry White
- Karyn White
- Keisha White
- Maurice White
- Vanessa White
- Norman Whitfield
- D'wayne Wiggins
- Eugene Wilde
- Wild Orchid
- Mack Wilds
- will.i.am
- Andre Williams
- Alyson Williams
- Christopher Williams
- Deniece Williams
- Emily Williams
- Kiely Williams
- Lenny Williams
- Michelle Williams
- Pharrell Williams
- Stokley Williams
- Vanessa Williams
- Vesta Williams
- Willie Hutch
- Willie Max
- Chuck Willis
- Charlie Wilson
- Charlotte Day Wilson
- Jackie Wilson
- Nancy Wilson
- Omar Wilson
- BeBe Winans
- CeCe Winans
- Mario Winans
- Angela Winbush
- Amy Winehouse
- Ophélie Winter
- Steve Winwood
- Bill Withers
- Wizkid
- Bobby Womack
- Cory Wong
- Wonho
- Belita Woods
- Wretch 32
- Bernard Wright
- Billy Wright
- WSTRN
- Julia Wu
- Rini Wulandari

== X ==
- X-Quisite
- Xscape
- X Clan
- XXXTentacion

== Y ==
- Elliott Yamin
- Yarbrough and Peoples
- Yasmeen
- Roy Yeager
- YK Osiris
- Y?N-Vee
- YNW Melly
- Yolka
- Yoon Mi-rae
- Young Greatness
- Younglord
- Young Rome
- Young Scrap
- Young Steff
- Val Young
- Yugyeom
- Yummy Bingham
- Yuna
- Yung Bleu
- Yxng Bane

== Z ==
- Zak Abel
- Zacari
- Michael Zager
- Zaho
- Maher Zain
- Zakiya
- Zapp
- Zayn
- Zendaya
- Zhané
- Zion.T
- Zucchero Fornaciari
- Jake Zyrus
- Z. Z. Hill
- ZZ Ward

== See also ==
- American R&B musical groups
- List of new jack swing artists
- List of music genres and styles

=== Billboard & UK R&B Chart Histories ===
- Hot R&B/Hip-Hop Billboard Songs | Adult R&B Billboard Songs
- Top R&B/Hip-Hop Billboard Albums | R&B/Hip-Hop Billboard Airplay
- List of UK R&B Albums Chart number ones of 2021
