= 1975 Nevis Local Council election =

Nevis Local Council election

- 8 December 1975 (no poll took place)

All 9 elected seats on the Nevis Local Council
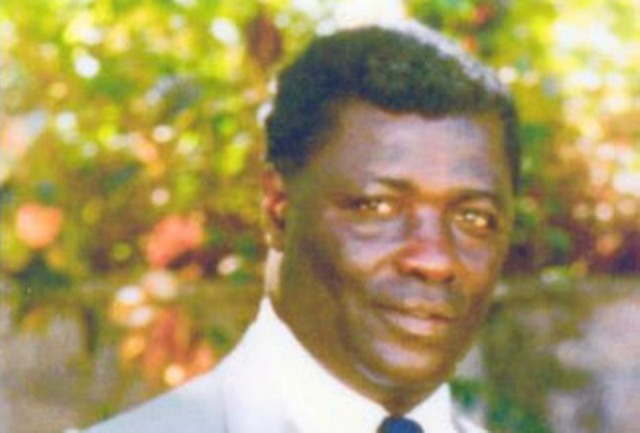
	First party
Leader	Simeon Daniel
Party	NRP
Last election	6 seats
Seats won	9
Seat change	▲3
Popular vote	Unopposed
Chairman of the Local Council before election
Simeon Daniel
Nevis Reformation Party
Chairman of
the Local Council after election
Simeon Daniel
Nevis Reformation Party

An election for the Nevis Local Council was scheduled for 8 December 1975, but saw no polling take place due to every candidate being returned unopposed and therefore elected without ballot. The election saw all nine seats be filled by members of the Nevis Reformation Party (NRP).

== Background ==
In the previous local election in 1971, the NRP had won a majority with six seats on the Nevis Local Council, while the United National Movement won two, and a seat was won by an independent. In November 1975, the NRP confirmed they had a full slate of candidates for all nine seats ready for the upcoming local election, with the date of the election for Nevis' council confirmed for 8 December 1975.

Just a week before the local election, a general election for the Saint Kitts-Nevis-Anguilla legislature took place, with the NRP winning both Nevisian seats in a landslide after having campaigned for secession from Saint Kitts and more powers for Nevis’ council. The NRP were the only party to nominate candidates for the local election.

== Election result ==
=== Result by ward ===
Ward	Party	Member	votes
1	NRP	Eustace Nisbett	Unopposed
2	NRP	Maude Cross	Unopposed
3	NRP	William Challenger	Unopposed
4	NRP	James Liburd	Unopposed
5	NRP	Simeon Daniel	Unopposed
6	NRP	James Brookes	Unopposed
7	NRP	Eustace Hanley	Unopposed
8	NRP	Uhral Swanston	Unopposed
9	NRP	Edgar Roper	Unopposed

Due to every NRP candidate being returned unopposed, no polling took place for the election as the nominated candidates were declared elected without ballot.

== Aftermath ==
Simeon Daniel continued to serve as Chairman of the Local Council, and Daniel and the NRP-led Local Council maintained calls for Nevisian secession from Saint Kitts and further powers for Nevis including its own Legislative Council.
