= Nevis Local Council =

The Nevis Local Council was the local government for the island of Nevis within the Associated State of Saint Christopher-Nevis-Anguilla from 1967 until 1983.

== History ==
=== 1967 – 1971 ===
In 1967, the Saint Christopher-Anguilla-Nevis legislature passed legislation that granted Anguilla and Nevis their own local councils. The Nevis Local Council was given some revenue raising powers around certain taxes, licence fees and rates (although this required approval from central government), while according to Urias Forbes writing in the Caribbean Studies journal, the council's powers created "either a duty or a discretion to regulate and control, or to maintain and, to a more limited extent, to establish a variety of public utilities and services connected with environmental sanitation, water, vehicular traffic, roadway maintenance, fire protection and recreational facilities.”

In April 1967, the council was inaugurated with nominated members, with the council’s first election taking place in December 1967. The election saw the People’s Action Movement (PAM) win five of six available elected seats, while the United National Movement won one seat, with the three remaining seats being appointed. While elected members held office until the next election, with elections being held every four years, nominated members held office for two years.

=== 1971 onwards ===
In November 1971, the council was reformed through the 1971 Local Government (Amendment) Act, which saw the three nominated seats being abolished in favour of all nine seats being elected. In the 1971 election held in December, the Nevis Reformation Party (NRP) won six of nine seats and Simeon Daniel, leader of the NRP, went on to serve as Chairman of the Local Council, succeeding Fred Parris to the position. The NRP had campaigned on a platform of Nevisian independence from Saint Kitts. In March 1974, the Nevis Local Council voted to pass a resolution calling for Nevisian independence from Saint Kitts.

In the 1975 election, the NRP won all nine seats unopposed. In 1976, the Nevis Local Council declared “be it resolved that the people of Nevis through the Nevis Local Council call upon the Central Government of the State to introduce the necessary Legislation in order to give to the island of Nevis its own Legislative Council as expressed by the people of Nevis at the recent elections” and later that year the NRP again entered talks with the central government seeking independence, with the NRP later unilaterally holding a referendum on independence in 1977. The referendum result in favour of independence was rejected by the central government. In the 1979 election, the council remained in control of the NRP, who again won all nine seats and defeated the Saint Kitts and Nevis Labour Party.

== Abolishment ==
In September 1983, following Saint Kitts and Nevis becoming independent from the United Kingdom, the constitution of the newly formed federation of the two islands granted Nevis its own legislature, the Nevis Island Assembly, with the Nevis Local Council being replaced by this new Assembly.
