= Everything's Strange Here =

Compilation album by G-Eazy
- Released: June 26, 2020
- Length: 39:02
- Labels: BPG; RVG; RCA
- Producers: Ambezza; Austin Ward; Bailey Lindley; Christoph Andersson; Cole M.G.N.; Dakarai Gwitira; Dusty Kessler; G-Eazy; Jesse Ackerman; John Michael; Julia Lewis; Marshmello; Pearl Lion; Peter Martin; Rvnes

G-Eazy chronology
The Beautiful & Damned (2017)	Everything's Strange Here (2020)	These Things Happen Too (2021)

Singles from Everything's Strange Here
- 1. "Free Porn Cheap Drugs" Released: May 22, 2020; 2. "Stan by Me" Released: May 29, 2020; 3. "Everybody's Gotta Learn Sometime" Released: June 19, 2020; 4. "Nostalgia Cycle" Released: June 22, 2020; 5. "Had Enough" Released: June 27, 2020

Everything's Strange Here is a compilation album by American rapper G-Eazy. Described as a side project, it was released commercially for streaming only, on June 26, 2020, via RCA Records. Production was handled by several record producers, including Cole M.G.N., Dakarai Gwitira, Marshmello and Christoph Andersson among others. The project features a guest appearance from Ashley Benson.

The album's sound was described as a detachment from G-Eazy's usual hip hop music.

Professional ratings
Review scores
Source	Rating
AllMusic	3.5/5 stars
Pitchfork	5.6/10

== Track listing ==
Everything's Strange Here track listing
No.	Title	Writer(s)	Producer(s)	Length
1.	"Everybody's Gotta Learn Sometime"	James Edward Warren	G-Eazy; Cole M.G.N.	2:57
2.	"Free Porn Cheap Drugs"	Gerald Gillum; Austin Ward Sherman; Jesse Ackerman	Austin Ward; Jesse Ackerman	3:20
3.	"Back to What You Knew"	Gillum; Sherman; Ackerman; Richard Booker-Tandy	G-Eazy; Austin Ward; Jesse Ackerman	3:25
4.	"All the Things You're Searching For" (featuring Kossisko and Ashley Benson)	Gillum; Benjamin Falik; Kossisko Konan	G-Eazy; Christoph Andersson; Julia Lewis	3:57
5.	"Stan by Me"	Gillum; Konan; Cole Marsden Greif-Neill; Jacob Michael Deimler; Jared Scharff; Christopher Comstock	Marshmello; Pearl Lion; Rvnes	3:37
6.	"In the Middle"	Gillum; Konan; Bailey Lindley; Mathias Liyew	Ambezza; Bailey Lindley	2:58
7.	"Nostalgia Cycle"	Gillum; Christoph Andersson; Pete "Boxsta" Martin	Christoph Andersson; Peter Martin	2:44
8.	"Every Night of the Year"	Gillum; Dakarai Gwitira; Ashley Benson; John Michael Rouchell	G-Eazy; John Michael	5:11
9.	"Lazarus"	David Robert Jones	G-Eazy; Cole M.G.N.	3:37
10.	"Had Enough"	Gillum; Konan; Gwitira; Dusty Kessler; Carly Simon; Charles Williams; Darryl McDaniels; Earl Stevens; Jonathan Smith; Joseph Ward Simmons; Russell Simmons	G-Eazy; Dakarai Gwitira; Dusty Kessler	3:13
Total length:				35:07

Reissue
No.	Title	Writer(s)	Producer(s)	Length
11.	"Sun Bleached & Dried"	Gillum; Gwitira	Gwitira	3:55
Total length:				39:02

== Charts ==
Chart performance for Everything's Strange Here
Chart (2020)	Peak position
US Billboard 200	143
