= The Beautiful & Damned (album) =

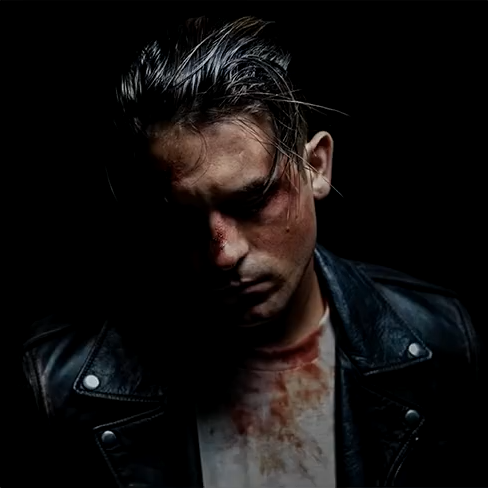

Studio album by G-Eazy
- Released: December 15, 2017
- Genre: Hip-hop
- Length: 74:22
- Labels: BPG; RVG; RCA
- Producers: Allen Ritter; Boi-1da; Cardiak; Charlie Puth; Christoph Andersson; Cubeatz; Dakari; Danno; David Guetta; Dillon Francis; FNZ; G-Eazy; Henry Daher; Hitmaka; J Gramm; Michael Keenan; OZ; Kuya Beats; Rogét Chahayed; SG Lewis; Swish; The Futuristics

G-Eazy chronology
When It's Dark Out (2015)	The Beautiful & Damned (2017)	Everything's Strange Here (2020)

Singles from The Beautiful & Damned
- 1. "No Limit" Released: September 8, 2017; 2. "Him & I" Released: November 30, 2017; 3. "Sober" Released: December 8, 2017

The Beautiful & Damned is the fifth studio album by American rapper G-Eazy. It was released on December 15, 2017, by RCA Records. It features guest appearances from Halsey, Cardi B, ASAP Rocky, Kehlani, E-40 and Charlie Puth. The album was preceded by three singles: "No Limit", "Him & I" and "Sober".

== Background ==
The album's cover art and release was released on November 8, 2017. A short film accompanied its release date. The film was directed by Bobby Bruderle alongside G-Eazy, who co-wrote it and was released as an Apple Music exclusive. It was later revealed that G-Eazy paid for the film himself, costing around $700,000. In an interview with Angie Martinez, he revealed the album's concept.

"The concept of it is kinda split in half and it's two CDs, but for all intents and purposes its 20 songs, it's just a long album," he explained. "The concept of it is kinda like its about the lifestyle, 'The Beautiful and Damned'. Like being a kid, having the dream of doing this, starting from square one, from outside looking in from without having nothing -- to chasing this dream, and then all these years down the road of following this yellow brick road trying to get to where you're going, one day waking up and being like, 'Did it take me where I wanted to go?' This fantasy of, like, sex, drugs, & rock 'n' roll is kinda clichéd, but it's clichéd for a reason. It's dark."

== Critical reception ==
Professional ratings
Aggregate scores
Source	Rating
Metacritic	59/100
Review scores
Source	Rating
AllMusic	4.0/5 stars
Consequence of Sound	D+
The Guardian	2.0/5 stars
HipHopDX	3.9/5
Pitchfork	5.1/10

The Beautiful & Damned received generally mixed reviews from music critics, with a score on Metacritc of 59/100. Neil Z. Young of AllMusic gave the album 4 out of 5 stars stating that, "With an inspired guest list and excellent production, The Beautiful & Damned is a satisfying artistic accomplishment that cautions as much as it seduces." HipHopDX concluded; "Established formulas of pandering singles and assembly line choruses aside, The Beautiful & Damned possesses enough serious assertiveness and classic Bay area slick talk to get burn well into 2018.", giving the album 3.9 out of 5 stars.

In a more mixed review, Sheldon Pearce of Pitchfork gave the album a 5.1 out of 10, and said that, "There are no insights to be found here about prestige, depression, or dependency. The whole thing is unbelievably dour and boring." Rachel Aroesti of The Guardian gave the album 2 out of 4 stars, and disapproved of the album's themes, stating in her conclusion, that, "His take on rap’s current go-to themes of drug dependency, joyless sex and the double-edged sword of success feels stale and smug."

In a negative review, Wren Graves of Consequence of Sound shared a similar sentiment, and gave the album a D+, stating "There’s no interruption, no welcome silence between discs one and discs two. No, just 20 songs, a brutal slog of stacks and condoms and stacks and condoms and occasionally a disembodied ass without any other parts of a woman sighted."

== Commercial performance ==
The Beautiful & Damned debuted at number three on the US Billboard 200 with 122,000 album-equivalent units, of which 68,000 were pure album sales. It is G-Eazy's third US top 10 album. In its second week, the album dropped to number eight on the chart, earning an additional 50,000 album-equivalent units. In its third week, the album climbed to number four on the chart, selling 42,000 more album-equivalent units. In its fourth week, the album climbed to number three on the chart, selling 38,000 units, bringing its four-week total to 252,000 album-equivalent units. On January 31, 2019, the album was certified platinum by the Recording Industry Association of America (RIAA) for combined sales and album-equivalent units of over a million units in the United States.

== Track listing ==
Credits adapted from Tidal.

No.	Title	Writer(s)	Producer(s)	Length
1.	"The Beautiful & Damned" (featuring Zoe Nash)	Gerald Gillum; Dakarai Gwitira; Madison Wolf; Mali-Koa Hood; Georgia Sinclair	Dakari	3:09
2.	"Pray for Me"	Gillum; Matthew Samuels; Kevin Gomringer; Tim Gomringer; Edgar Machuca	Boi-1da; Cubeatz	3:27
3.	"Him & I" (with Halsey)	Gillum; Ashley Frangipane; Alexander Schwartz; Joe Khajadourian; Machuca	The Futuristics	4:28
4.	"But a Dream"	Gillum; Gwitira; Dillon Hart; Devon Baldwin	Dakari; Dillon Francis	3:26
5.	"Sober" (featuring Charlie Puth)	Gillum; Charlie Puth; Schwartz; Khajadourian; Gwitira; Machuca; Ester Dean; Breyan Isaac; Matt Dragstrem	The Futuristics; Dakari; Charlie Puth	3:23
6.	"Legend"	Gillum; Ozan Yildrim; Christoph Andersson; Daniele Gagliardi	OZ; Andersson^{[b]}; Danno^{[b]}	3:25
7.	"No Limit" (featuring ASAP Rocky and Cardi B)	Gillum; Rakim Mayers; Belcalis Almanzar; Samuels; Allen Ritter; Edgar Machuca; Klenord Raphaël; Earl Taylor; Jordan Thorpe	Boi-1da; Ritter	4:05
8.	"The Plan"	Gillum; Gwitira	Dakari	4:10
9.	"That's a Lot"	Gillum; Julian Gramma; John Mitchell; Machuca; Gwitira	J Gramm	3:34
10.	"Pick Me Up" (featuring Anna of the North)	Gillum; Anna of the North; David Guetta; Gwitira; Marcus Van Wattum; Jim Lavigne; Holly Hafermann; Giorgio Tuinfort	David Guetta; Dakari; Marcus Van Wattum^{[a]}	3:47
11.	"Gotdamn"	Gillum; Shane Lindstrom; Yildirim	Murda Beatz; OZ^{[a]}	2:52
12.	"Leviathan" (featuring Sam Martin)	Gillum; Michael Keenan; Gwitira; Nicolas Scapa; Michael Aljadeff; Machuca	Keenan; Dakari^{[b]}	3:47
13.	"Crash & Burn" (featuring Kehlani)	Gillum; Kehlani Parrish; Carl McCormick; Christian J. Ward; Rogét Chahayed; Gwitira; Floyd Bentley; Machuca; Gabrielle Nowee	Cardiak; Hitmaka^{[a]}; Chahayed^{[a]}; Dakari^{[b]}	3:00
14.	"Summer in December"	Gillum; Gwitira; Henrique Daher; Chick Corea; Gary Burton	Dakari; Henry Daher	3:06
15.	"Charles Brown" (featuring E-40 and Jay Ant)	Gillum; Earl Stevens; Jay Fort; Oliver Rodriguez; David Teel; Gwitira; Paulo Rodriguez; Gerald Goffin; Kanye West; Adam Levine; Michael Masser	Kuya Beats	4:48
16.	"No Less" (with SG Lewis and Louis Mattrs)	Gillum; Samuel Lewis; Louis Collard-Watson; Edward Thomas	SG Lewis	4:10
17.	"Mama Always Told Me" (featuring Madison Love)	Gillum; Michael Mule; Isaac De Boni; Samuel Ahana; Matthew Colwell; Jack Revens; Francis George Jones; Bradford Pinto; Kaelyn Behr	Swish; FNZ	3:11
18.	"Fly Away" (featuring Ugochi)	Gillum; Ugochi Azuike; Gwitira	Dakari	3:31
19.	"Love is Gone" (featuring Drew Love)	Gillum; Drew Love; Gwitira	Dakari; G-Eazy	3:54
20.	"Eazy" (featuring Son Lux)	Gillum; Gwitira; Ryan Lott	Dakari; G-Eazy	5:09
Total length:				74:22

3rd anniversary deluxe edition bonus tracks
No.	Title	Writer(s)	Producer(s)	Length
21.	"Boss Tycoon" (featuring Kossisko and Slimmy B)	Gillum; Kossisko Konan; Jabbar Brown; Ben Manlove; Joseph Waks; Andre Louis Hicks; Halston Williams	Manlove; Waks	3:34
22.	"Love You Like I Do" (featuring Rittybo)	Gillum; Rittear Lam; Anthony Paul Jefferies; Aubrey Drake Graham; Timmy Thomas; Adam Feeney; Anderson Hernandez; Tyler James Bryant; Kaan Gunesberk	Gillum	3:54
Total length:				81:50

Track notes

- ^{^[a]} signifies a co-producer
- ^{^[b]} signifies an additional producer
- "Pray for Me" features background vocals by Madison Love.
- "But a Dream" features background vocals by Devon Baldwin.
- "Leviathan" features background vocals by Michael Jade and Nicky Blitz.
- "No Less" is a remix of SG Lewis' song "No Less".
- "Love Is Gone" features background vocals by Leven Kali.
- "Charles Brown" contains uncredited interpolations of "Heard Em Say" by Kanye West.
- "Eazy" samples "Easy" by Son Lux.
- "Mama Always Told Me" samples "Boys like You" by 360.

== Personnel ==
Credits adapted from Tidal.

Performers

- G-Eazy – primary artist
- Halsey – primary artist (track 3)
- SG Lewis – primary artist (track 16)
- Louis Mattrs – primary artist (track 16)
- Zoe Nash – featured artist (track 1)
- Charlie Puth – featured artist (track 5)
- ASAP Rocky – featured artist (track 7)
- Cardi B – featured artist (track 7)
- Anna of the North – featured artist (track 10)
- Sam Martin – featured artist (track 12)
- Kehlani – featured artist (track 13)
- E-40 – featured artist (track 15)
- Jay Ant – featured artist (track 15)
- Madison Love – featured artist (track 17)
- Ugochi – featured artist (track 18)
- Drew Love – featured artist (track 19)
- Son Lux – featured artist (track 20)

Technical

- Dakari – recording engineer (all tracks)
- Jaycen Joshua – mixing engineer (tracks 1, 4−20)
- David Nakaji – assistant mixing engineer (tracks 1, 4−20)
- Ben Milchev – assistant mixing engineer (tracks 1, 4−6, 9−20)
- Serban Ghenea – mixing engineer (track 3)
- John Hanes – mixing engineer (track 3)
- Ivan Jimenez – assistant mixing engineer (tracks 7, 8)
- Dave Kutch – mastering engineer (tracks 7, 8)

Production

- Dakari – producer (tracks 1, 4, 5, 8, 18−20), additional producer (tracks 12, 13)
- Boi-1da – producer (track 2)
- Cubeatz – producer (track 2)
- The Futuristics – producer (track 3 5)
- Dillon Francis – producer (track 4)
- OZ – producer (track 6), co-producer (track 11)
- Christoph Andersson – producer (track 6)
- Danno – producer (track 6)
- Boi-1da – producer (track 7)
- Allen Ritter – producer (track 7)
- J Gramm – producer (track 9)
- Michael Keenan – producer (track 12)
- Cardiak – producer (track 13)
- Hitmaka – co-producer (track 13)
- Rogét Chahayed – co-producer (track 13)
- Henry Daher – producer (track 14)
- Kuya Beats – producer (track 15)
- SG Lewis – producer (track 16)
- Swish – producer (track 17)
- FNZ – producer (track 17)
- G-Eazy – producer (tracks 19, 20)

== Charts ==
=== Weekly charts ===
Chart (2017–2018)	Peak position
Australian Albums (ARIA)	38
Austrian Albums (Ö3 Austria)	48
Belgian Albums (Ultratop Flanders)	87
Belgian Albums (Ultratop Wallonia)	106
Canadian Albums (Billboard)	4
Danish Albums (Hitlisten)	18
Dutch Albums (Album Top 100)	24
Finnish Albums (Suomen virallinen lista)	5
German Albums (Offizielle Top 100)	56
Irish Albums (IRMA)	68
Latvian Albums (LaIPA)	4
New Zealand Albums (RMNZ)	25
Norwegian Albums (VG-lista)	7
Swedish Albums (Sverigetopplistan)	15
Swiss Albums (Schweizer Hitparade)	38
UK Albums (Official Charts)	76
UK R&B Albums (Official Charts)	8
US Billboard 200	3
US Top R&B/Hip-Hop Albums (Billboard)	1

=== Year-end charts ===
Chart (2018)	Position
Canadian Albums (Billboard)	26
US Billboard 200	29
US Top R&B/Hip-Hop Albums (Billboard)	24

== Certifications ==
Region	Certification	Certified units/sales
Canada (Music Canada)	Platinum	80,000^{‡}
Denmark (IFPI Danmark)	Gold	10,000^{‡}
France (SNEP)	Gold	50,000^{‡}
New Zealand (RMNZ)	Platinum	15,000^{‡}
Norway (IFPI Norway)	Platinum	20,000^{‡}
Poland (ZPAV)	Platinum	20,000^{‡}
United States (RIAA)	Platinum	1,000,000^{‡}
^{‡} Sales+streaming figures based on certification alone.
