= Dakari =

Dakari may refer to:

- Dakari or Dakarai Gwitira, Zimbabwe-born music producer
- Dakari Johnson (born 1995), American basketball player

== See also ==
- Dakarai
