= United National Movement (disambiguation) =

United National Movement is a Georgian political party.

United National Movement may also refer to:

- United National Movement (Pakistan)
- United National Movement (Saint Kitts-Nevis-Anguilla)
