= Dakarai =

Dakarai is a given name. Notable people with the name include:

- Dakarai Allen (born 1995), American basketball player
- Dakarai Gwitira, Zimbabwe-born music producer
- Dakarai Tucker (born 1994), American basketball player

== See also ==
- Dakari
