= Edna McGriff =

American singer

- Born: December 16, 1935; Tampa, Florida, United States
- Died: March 25, 1980 (aged 44) Queens, New York, United States
- Genres: Rhythm and blues
- Occupations: Singer, pianist
- Instruments: Vocals, piano
- Years active: 1950s
- Labels: Various including Jubilee, Josie, Bell and Brunswick (Latter day compilation on Bear Family Records)

Edna McGriff (December 16, 1935 – March 25, 1980) was an American rhythm and blues singer and pianist. She recorded mainly in the 1950s, and secured one hit single on the US Billboard R&B chart with "Heavenly Father" in 1952. The record sold over 500,000 copies.

== Life and career ==
Edna McGriff was born in Tampa, Hillsborough County, Florida, United States. She was educated at Washington Irving High School in New York. She released her first single, "Note Droppin' Papa" / "Come Back", on Jubilee Records in September 1951 with Bennie Green's band. Her second recording took place late that same year, when she sang with Buddy Lucas and His Band of Tomorrow on "Heavenly Father" / "I Love You". She was aged 16 at the time. The single was released in early 1952, and sales started to soar. The track entered the US R&B chart in April 1952, peaking at No. 4 in a 13-week stay. Various cover versions of "Heavenly Father" appeared, recorded by Fran Warren, The Four Lads, and also Evelyn Knight.

McGriff appeared on stage at the Earle Theater in Philadelphia. Various shows followed, where she was placed on the bill with Alan Freed. Separately in June 1952, McGriff recorded six duets with Sonny Til of The Orioles, including "I Only Have Eyes for You", "Once in a While", "Picadilly" and "Good".

Her next solo release was "Pray For A Better World" / "In A Chapel by the Side of The Road", followed by "Edna's Blues" / "Why Oh Why" (1953). Several other releases flopped and she moved to Josie Records, who issued "I'll Be Around" / "Ooh, Little Daddy" (1954), and then onto Favorite Records, but without any further chart activity. Bell Records took up her contract, and issued "The Fool" / "Born to Be with You" (1956), and these were followed by many other cover versions, including Laurie London's "He's Got the Whole World in His Hands" and Huey "Piano" Smith's "Don't You Just Know It", however she had stopped recording with Bell by the time she was 22 years old. In 1958, she recorded a one-off single for Felsted, followed by another one-off for Savoy, this time duetting with longtime friend Buddy Lucas on "No Change" / "Ah-Ah-Ah". Thereafter her career gradually wound down, with a small sprinkle of recordings spread over two record companies – Willow Records in 1961 (a remake of "Heavenly Father"), and Capitol during 1964–1965.

The Connecticut Marriage Index 1959–2001, reveals that at age 23 she married Leroy Minors in Stamford, Fairfield County, Connecticut, on March 7, 1959. The Social Security Death Index records that Edna Minors (née McGriff) died in Queens, New York, on March 25, 1980, aged 44 years. An obituary was printed in the New York Amsterdam News, and it is thought that her death was due to lymphoma.

In August 2012, a compilation album of her recordings was issued by Bear Family Records.

== Discography ==
=== Compilation album ===
Year	Title	Record label
2012	Start Movin' in My Direction	Bear Family Records

== See also ==
- List of R&B musicians
