= Sober (G-Eazy song) =

2017 single by G-Eazy featuring Charlie Puth

Single by G-Eazy featuring Charlie Puth

from the album The Beautiful & Damned
- Written: 2015
- Released: December 8, 2017
- Length: 3:23
- Label: RCA
- Songwriters: Gerald Gillum; Charlie Puth; Dakarai Gwitira; Joe Khajadourian; Breyan Isaac; Ester Dean; Alex Schwartz; Matt Dragstrem; Edgar Machuca
- Producers: Dakari; Charlie Puth; The Futuristics

G-Eazy singles chronology
| "Him & I" (2017) | "Sober" (2017) | "1942" (2018) |

Charlie Puth singles chronology
| "How Long" (2017) | "Sober" (2017) | "Done for Me" (2018) |

Audio sample
- file; help

Music video
- "Sober" on YouTube

"Sober" is a song by American rapper G-Eazy, featuring vocals from American singer-songwriter Charlie Puth. It was released via RCA Records on December 8, 2017, as the third single from G-Eazy's third studio album, The Beautiful & Damned. Puth produced the song with Dakari and the Futuristics, and they wrote the song with G-Eazy alongside Matt Dragstrem and Edgar Machuca.

== Background ==
G-Eazy revealed the album's full track listing alongside the single release. Talking about how the collaboration came together, G-Eazy told MTV News: "Charlie is one of the most talented individuals in music. He's a really special artist. We met a while ago when we're touring in Europe, and we're playing venues right next to each other. We clicked up that night and just talked and just vibed, and I found out he is a huge fan of the Bay Area hip hop, it was a huge new found respect for him on that level."

In an interview with Billboard, Puth said that he wrote the song with Breyan Issac and Ester Dean in 2015, which was a dark point in his life, and that he had someone in mind when he wrote it. He continued: "You never know where these songs are gonna go. I had originally written verses, like sing-y verses, and it just didn't feel right. It felt like it needed an Eminem type story. When I heard G's verses on it, they just happened to be something similar to what I went through. There is no other person who could have done it better than G. I love G. Young Gerald, Eazy season. He's my tallest friend."

== Music video ==
The music was released on March 14, 2018 on Vevo and YouTube.

== Critical reception ==
Megan Armstrong of Billboard made the metaphor of G-Eazy's rapping being "the devil on one shoulder" and Puth's voice being "the angel on the other [shoulder]". She praised both artists for playing off their contrast in styles. Deepa Lakshmin of MTV News felt "G-Eazy's rap verses blend perfectly with Puth's smooth vocals". Mike Wass of Idolator regarded the song as "a bro-anthem" and "an ode to, and a cautionary tale about, drunken nights". He praised Puth for providing "an instantly hummable chorus".

== Credits and personnel ==
Credits adapted from Tidal.

- G-Eazy – songwriting
- Charlie Puth – songwriting, production
- Breyan Isaac – songwriting
- The Futuristics – songwriting, production
- Ester Dean – songwriting
- Matt Dragstrem – songwriting
- Dakarai Gwitira – songwriting, production, record engineering
- Edgar Machuca – songwriting
- Jaycen Joshua – mix engineering
- Ben Milchev – engineering assistance
- David Nakaji – engineering assistance

== Charts ==
| Chart (2017–2018) | Peak position |
|---|---|
| Belgium (Ultratip Bubbling Under Wallonia) | 4 |
| Canada Hot 100 (Billboard) | 80 |
| Czech Republic Airplay (ČNS IFPI) | 16 |
| Latvia (DigiTop100) | 74 |
| New Zealand Heatseeker (RMNZ) | 9 |
| US Bubbling Under Hot 100 (Billboard) | 6 |
| US Hot R&B/Hip-Hop Songs (Billboard) | 49 |
| US Pop Airplay (Billboard) | 33 |
| US Rhythmic Airplay (Billboard) | 15 |

== Certifications ==
| Region | Certification | Certified units/sales |
|---|---|---|
| Canada (Music Canada) | Gold | 40,000^{‡} |
| United States (RIAA) | Gold | 500,000^{‡} |
^{‡} Sales+streaming figures based on certification alone.

== Release history ==
| Region | Date | Format | Label | Ref. |
|---|---|---|---|---|
| Various | December 8, 2017 | Digital download | RCA | |
| Australia | March 16, 2018 | Contemporary hit radio | Sony | |
| United States | March 20, 2018 | Contemporary hit radio | RCA | |
| Italy | March 23, 2018 | Contemporary hit radio | Sony | |
