= No Limit (G-Eazy song) =

Single by G-Eazy featuring ASAP Rocky and Cardi B

from the album The Beautiful and Damned
- Released: September 8, 2017
- Genre: Trap; dirty rap; hyphy
- Length: 4:05
- Label: RCA
- Songwriters: Gerald Gillum; Rakim Mayers; Belcalis Almanzar; Edgar Machuca; Klenord Raphael; Allen Ritter; Matthew Samuels; Earl Taylor; Jordan Thorpe
- Producers: Boi-1da; Allen Ritter

G-Eazy singles chronology
"Wicked" (2017)	"No Limit" (2017)	"Him & I" (2017)

ASAP Rocky singles chronology
"Groupie Love" (2017)	"No Limit" (2017)	"Pick It Up" (2017)

Cardi B singles chronology
"Bodak Yellow" (2017)	"No Limit" (2017)	"MotorSport (song)" (2017)

Remix cover
- Cover art of the official remix

Music video
- "No Limit REMIX" on YouTube

Remix audio
- "No Limit (Remix)" on YouTube

"No Limit" is a song by American rapper G-Eazy featuring fellow American rappers A$AP Rocky and Cardi B. It was written by the artists, Edgar Machuca, Klenord Raphael, Earlly Mac, Pardison Fontaine, and producers Allen Ritter and Boi-1da. The song was released through RCA Records on September 8, 2017, as the lead single from G-Eazy's third studio album, The Beautiful & Damned (2017).

Reaching number four on the US Billboard Hot 100, it became G-Eazy's and ASAP Rocky's highest-charting song, and Cardi B's second top five single on the chart.

== Background ==
On August 30, 2017, G-Eazy debuted the song with Cardi B in New Orleans, during one of his Bud Light's Dive Bar Tour live shows, along with the debut of his collaboration with American singer-songwriter Halsey, "Him & I". G-Eazy told Billboard about the two collaborations: "That raw connection between the two performers is something you can't fully plan. You just go with it and get lost in that moment and feed off of each other." In an interview with Uproxx before the show, G-Eazy said of the reason behind collaborating with Cardi B: "I'm a super fan of her and everything she's doing right now is incredible. I think she represents where music is today. It's real, it's raw, it's honest, it's pure. It's not contrived, it's not overly thought out or put together. It's just what the youth is reacting to, what the culture is reacting to, what sounds and feels good. You know? What sounds and feels good is what's working. Her music's incredible. Her whole personality, her energy, everything."

Talking about how the collaboration came about, G-Eazy told Fuse in an interview regarding his upcoming studio album: "It started as me and ASAP Rocky in the studio. He was working a room next to mine and he came in and said what's up. We sent the track to Cardi B and she killed it. I've been following her ever since she first started to buzz. I always wanted to connect with her. I met her at a show we played almost a year ago. I could tell right then and there she was going to be a super star. You can tell a lot by watching somebody perform live and getting to know their energy in real life. I knew I wanted to work with her, but it was about finding the right record and the right timing. This "No Limit" song just made sense." The song's beat contains a sample of the Memphis rap classic "Slob on My Knob" by hip hop group Three 6 Mafia, produced by member and rapper Juicy J.

== Critical reception ==
Madeline Roth of MTV News opined that Cardi B "clearly steals the show" on the studio version of the song compared to its prior live performance, and referred to this as "something she's been doing a lot of since 'Bodak Yellow' took over the charts". Both Roth and Carl Lamarre of Billboard felt Rocky "sits tight on the hook". Jessica McKinney of Vibe wrote that the song "seems to have a hard-hitting hip-hop beat". Peter Berry of XXL called it "an energetic new banger" and wrote that it "features a bouncy trap beat and typically confident bars from each of the three MC's". Beatrice Hazlehurst of Paper praised Cardi B for "proving she's far from a one-hit wonder" with her verse.

Aaron Williams of Uproxx described the song as "an aptly titled, fast-paced, Master P-esque trunk rattler", and wrote that the song "owes a lot to the sound cultivated by Master P twenty years ago, with plenty of New Orleans bounce", as the three artists on the track "deliver their usual unsophisticatedly entertaining signature styles on their verses". He added that Cardi B's verse is "especially entertaining as she wittily compares her current charts success to 'pussy popping'". Matt Fish of HotNewHipHop regarded it as "a tight, radio-ready track" that features "an energetic trap beat" that "provides a bouncy backbone for all three emcees". He was impressed by Cardi B despite the strong performances of the other two artists because "her flow feels effortless and her tone is sharp and on-point during her verse, gifting us with another strong turn on this record".

== Remix ==
The official remix was released on December 12, 2017, alongside a music video. It features French Montana, Belly and Juicy J, as well as a new verse from G-Eazy. Cardi B does not appear on the remix.

== Music video ==
The official music video was released on December 19, 2017, featuring all those who were on the original and remix. It was directed by Daniel Cz.

== Commercial performance ==
"No Limit" became G-Eazy's highest-charting song on the Billboard Hot 100 and first top five hit, peaking at number four. It also became Cardi B's second top five single on the chart and became ASAP Rocky's highest-charting song, surpassing his previous best of number five with his feature on "Good for You" by Selena Gomez.

On November 25, 2025, the song was certified eight-times platinum in the United States by the RIAA, for sales and streams equivalent to or exceeding eight million units.

== Credits and personnel ==
Credits adapted from Tidal.

- Allen Ritter – production
- Boi-1da – production
- Jaycen Joshua – mix engineering
- Dave Kutch – master engineering
- David Nakaji – engineering assistance
- Ivan Jimenez – engineering assistance
- Dakarai Gwitira – record engineering

== Charts ==
=== Weekly charts ===
Chart (2017–2018)	Peak position
Australia (ARIA)	43
Austria (Ö3 Austria Top 40)	60
Belgium (Ultratip Bubbling Under Flanders)	13
Belgium (Ultratip Bubbling Under Wallonia)	22
Canada Hot 100 (Billboard)	7
Czech Republic Singles Digital (ČNS IFPI)	39
Germany (GfK)	63
Greece International (IFPI)	6
Hungary (Stream Top 40)	20
Ireland (IRMA)	61
Latvia (DigiTop100)	13
Netherlands (Single Top 100)	56
New Zealand (Recorded Music NZ)	21
Portugal (AFP)	41
Slovakia Singles Digital (ČNS IFPI)	42
Sweden (Sverigetopplistan)	57
Switzerland (Schweizer Hitparade)	54
UK Singles (Official Charts)	45
UK Hip Hop/R&B (Official Charts)	24
US Billboard Hot 100	4
US Hot R&B/Hip-Hop Songs (Billboard)	2
US Pop Airplay (Billboard)	36
US Rhythmic Airplay (Billboard)	1

=== Year-end charts ===
Chart (2017)	Position
US Hot R&B/Hip-Hop Songs (Billboard)	78
Chart (2018)	Position
Canada (Canadian Hot 100)	57
US Billboard Hot 100	30
US Hot R&B/Hip-Hop Songs (Billboard)	18
US Rhythmic (Billboard)	24

== Certifications ==
Region	Certification	Certified units/sales
Australia (ARIA)	Platinum	70,000^{‡}
Canada (Music Canada)	4× Platinum	320,000^{‡}
Denmark (IFPI Danmark)	Gold	45,000^{‡}
Germany (BVMI)	Gold	200,000^{‡}
New Zealand (RMNZ)	3× Platinum	90,000^{‡}
Poland (ZPAV)	Gold	25,000^{‡}
United Kingdom (BPI)	Gold	400,000^{‡}
United States (RIAA)	8× Platinum	8,000,000^{‡}
^{‡} Sales+streaming figures based on certification alone.

== Release history ==
Region	Date	Format	Label	Ref.
Various	September 8, 2017	Digital download	RCA	
