= Him & I =

Single by G-Eazy and Halsey

from the album The Beautiful & Damned
- Released: November 30, 2017
- Recorded: 2017
- Length: 4:29
- Label: RCA
- Songwriters: Jim Lavigne; Dakarai Gwitira; Madison Love; Joe Khajadourian; Edgar Machuca; Alexander Schwartz; Gerald Gillum; Ashley Frangipane
- Producer: The Futuristics

G-Eazy singles chronology
"No Limit" (2017)	"Him & I" (2017)	"Sober" (2017)

Halsey singles chronology
"Bad at Love" (2017)	"Him & I" (2017)	"Alone" (2018)

Music video
- "Him & I" on YouTube

"Him & I" is a song recorded by American rapper G-Eazy and American singer Halsey. The song was released via RCA Records on November 30, 2017, as the second single from the former's third studio album The Beautiful & Damned. It was written alongside Edgar Machuca, Jim Lavigne, Dakarai Gwitira, Madison Love, and production duo The Futuristics. The single reached the top 20 of the charts in the United States, Australia, Canada as well as multiple other countries.

== Background and release ==
On August 30, 2017, G-Eazy debuted the song with a performance at Blue Nile in New Orleans for the final show of his Bud Light's Dive Bar Tour. Halsey joined him on stage as a surprise guest, and she kissed G-Eazy for several seconds at the end of the performance. G-Eazy told Fuse in an interview before the concert:

"I've wanted to work with Halsey for a long time. I think she's an incredibly talented artist who has accomplished so much at such a young age. She's one of the biggest artists in the whole world. At 22 years old, that's pretty phenomenal. 'Him & I' is a Bonnie and Clyde song. It's a pretty intense, crazy in love song. She killed the record. She sounds phenomenal on it. I'm excited to share that experience onstage with her live one on one because she's a great performer."

G-Eazy told Billboard about the song as well as the Cardi B collaboration "No Limit": "That raw connection between the two performers is something you can't fully plan. You just go with it and get lost in that moment and feed off of each other." He and Halsey first teased the song through Instagram on November 28, 2017. "This Friday me and lil baby dropping 'Him & I,'" Halsey captioned with a rose emoji. G-Eazy captioned the same photo with "'Him & I' w baby girl out this Friday..." and heart emojis. He told Entertainment Weekly about working with Halsey: "It was super important to get her on the album. She's incredible, and I've been a big fan of hers for a long time, even before she was my girlfriend. Telling a story like the one we tell on ["Him & I"] adds a level of authenticity and honesty to our love story and [explores] how love fits into this crazy lifestyle that we live."

Speaking to KAMP-FM, Halsey stressed that the song is not "a contrived thing" nor "two artists pretending to be something they're not for the sake of a story", as the track mirrors their real-life love story. She furthered: "It's like we really made this record about our real lives and hopefully we get to share that with other people who feel similarly about each other and we're really fortunate. We live really cool lives and we get to do really cool stuff together and I just hope that, you know, some young couple somewhere in a slower part of world maybe can hear it and maybe imagine what it would be like for just four minutes."

== Composition ==
According to the sheet music published on Musicnotes.com, "Him & I" is composed in the key of A minor and set in a 4/4 time signature at a steady tempo of 88 beats per minute.

== Critical reception ==
Megan Armstrong of Billboard praised the song, writing that it "maintains each artist's individual identities while also fluidly melding them into one", as "Halsey's voice maintains the same eerie and powerful feel the world has come to associate with her, leading into G's rap verses". Rap-Up wrote: "The romantic anthem finds Halsey on the soaring chorus, with her sultry vocals over the pulsating beat."

== Music video ==
The accompanying music video begins with the line, "They were stars on this stage. Each playing to an audience of two," a F. Scott Fitzgerald quote from The Beautiful and Damned, followed by shots of the Brooklyn Bridge. G-Eazy and Halsey can be seen wandering the streets of New York City, as well as hanging out in dive bars. G-Eazy noted in a tweet: "One of my favorite videos I've ever done, because it's the most real, no extra shit, just her and I over a couple days in the city."

== Live performances ==
On December 12, 2017, G-Eazy performed the duet live on Jimmy Kimmel Live! with Halsey, along with a solo version of "No Limit". The pair took a cinematic approach to their performance on the outdoor stage, beginning with a camera following Halsey as she walk down an alley, while another tracking G-Eazy, who rolled up to the venue in a vintage black Mercedes. On December 19, 2017, they performed the song on Good Morning America. On January 13, 2018, they performed the song on Saturday Night Live.

== Credits and personnel ==
Credits adapted from Tidal.

- G-Eazy – songwriting
- Halsey – songwriting
- Jim Lavigne – songwriting
- Dakarai Gwitira – songwriting, recording engineering
- Madison Love – songwriting
- Edgar Machuca – songwriting
- The Futuristics – songwriting, production
- Jaycen Joshua – mixing engineering
- Serban Ghenea – mixing engineering
- Sean Malone – guitar [the Jiffian]

== Charts ==
=== Weekly charts ===
2017–2018 weekly chart performance for "Him & I"
Chart (2017–2018)	Peak position
Australia (ARIA)	10
Austria (Ö3 Austria Top 40)	9
Belarus Airplay (Eurofest)	8
Belgium (Ultratop 50 Flanders)	18
Belgium (Ultratip Bubbling Under Wallonia)	4
Bulgaria Airplay (PROPHON)	4
Canada Hot 100 (Billboard)	9
CIS Airplay (TopHit)	4
Colombia (National-Report)	36
Czech Republic Airplay (ČNS IFPI)	6
Czech Republic Singles Digital (ČNS IFPI)	4
Denmark (Tracklisten)	10
Ecuador (National-Report)	60
Finland (Suomen virallinen lista)	3
France (SNEP)	25
Germany (GfK)	6
Hungary (Rádiós Top 40)	6
Hungary (Single Top 40)	4
Hungary (Stream Top 40)	1
Ireland (IRMA)	16
Italy (FIMI)	72
Latvia (DigiTop100)	2
Lebanon Airplay (Lebanese Top 20)	4
Netherlands (Dutch Top 40)	15
Netherlands (Single Top 100)	17
New Zealand (Recorded Music NZ)	17
Norway (VG-lista)	6
Portugal (AFP)	13
Romania (Airplay 100)	1
Russia Airplay (TopHit)	5
Scottish Singles Sales (Official Charts)	24
Slovakia Singles Digital (ČNS IFPI)	5
Spain (PROMUSICAE)	89
Sweden (Sverigetopplistan)	9
Switzerland (Schweizer Hitparade)	9
UK Singles (Official Charts)	22
UK Hip Hop/R&B (Official Charts)	10
Ukraine Airplay (TopHit)	36
US Billboard Hot 100	14
US Adult Pop Airplay (Billboard)	29
US Dance Airplay (Billboard)	2
US Hot R&B/Hip-Hop Songs (Billboard)	7
US Pop Airplay (Billboard)	1
US Rhythmic Airplay (Billboard)	3
Venezuela (National-Report)	86

2019 weekly chart performance for "Him & I"
Chart (2019)	Peak position
CIS Airplay (TopHit)	85
Russia Airplay (TopHit)	100

2023 weekly chart performance for "Him & I"
Chart (2023)	Peak position
Belarus Airplay (TopHit)	180
Romania Airplay (TopHit)	80

2024 weekly chart performance for "Him & I"
Chart (2024)	Peak position
Romania Airplay (TopHit)	111

=== Year-end charts ===
Chart (2017)	Position
Hungary (Single Top 40)	77
Hungary (Stream Top 40)	82
Chart (2018)	Position
Australia (ARIA)	70
Canada (Canadian Hot 100)	43
CIS (Tophit)	13
France (SNEP)	126
Germany (Official German Charts)	41
Hungary (Rádiós Top 40)	43
Hungary (Single Top 40)	23
Netherlands (Dutch Top 40)	95
Portugal (AFP)	103
Romania (Airplay 100)	1
Russia Airplay (Tophit)	18
Switzerland (Schweizer Hitparade)	49
Ukraine Airplay (Tophit)	186
US Billboard Hot 100	45
US Dance/Mix Show Airplay (Billboard)	22
US Hot R&B/Hip-Hop Songs (Billboard)	23
US Mainstream Top 40 (Billboard)	19
US Rhythmic (Billboard)	18

== Certifications ==
Region	Certification	Certified units/sales
Australia (ARIA)	2× Platinum	140,000^{‡}
Austria (IFPI Austria)	Gold	15,000^{‡}
Belgium (BRMA)	Gold	10,000^{‡}
Canada (Music Canada)	3× Platinum	240,000^{‡}
Denmark (IFPI Danmark)	Platinum	90,000^{‡}
France (SNEP)	Diamond	333,333^{‡}
Germany (BVMI)	3× Gold	600,000^{‡}
Italy (FIMI)	Platinum	100,000^{‡}
Mexico (AMPROFON)	Platinum+Gold	90,000^{‡}
New Zealand (RMNZ)	3× Platinum	90,000^{‡}
Norway (IFPI Norway)	2× Platinum	120,000^{‡}
Poland (ZPAV)	3× Platinum	60,000^{‡}
Portugal (AFP)	Gold	5,000^{‡}
Spain (Promusicae)	Gold	30,000^{‡}
Switzerland (IFPI Switzerland)	Platinum	20,000^{‡}
United Kingdom (BPI)	Platinum	600,000^{‡}
United States (RIAA)	5× Platinum	5,000,000^{‡}
Streaming
Greece (IFPI Greece)	2× Platinum	4,000,000^{†}
Sweden (GLF)	Platinum	8,000,000^{†}
^{‡} Sales+streaming figures based on certification alone.^{†} Streaming-only figures based on certification alone.

== Release history ==
Region	Date	Format	Label	Ref.
Various	November 30, 2017	Digital download	BPG; RVG; RCA	
United States	December 5, 2017	Mainstream radio	RCA	
United States	December 5, 2017	Rhythmic contemporary radio	RCA	
Italy	January 26, 2018	Contemporary hit radio	Sony	

== See also ==
- List of Airplay 100 number ones of the 2010s
