= 1967 Nevis Local Council election =

Nevis Local Council election

- 15 December 1967

All 6 elected seats on the Nevis Local Council
	First party	Second party
Leader	William Valentine Herbert (Note: Herbert was president of the national party across Saint Kitts-Nevis-Anguilla, while Fred Parris and Ivor Stevens were members of the PAM executive from Nevis)	Eugene Walwyn
Party	PAM	UNM
Seats won	5	1

An election was held in Nevis on 15 December 1967 to elect members of the newly established Nevis Local Council. The results saw the People's Action Movement win a majority on the council.

== Background ==
This was the first election for the newly founded local government system in Nevis, which along with Anguilla, had been granted its own local council after the Saint Christopher-Nevis-Anguilla legislature had passed the Local Government Act in February 1967. Prior to the election in December 1967, the council had been formed by nominated members since April of that year.

== Results ==
The election was a landslide victory for the People’s Action Movement, who won five of six available seats, with the remaining seat going to the United National Movement. The council also had an additional three seats that were non-elected and appointed by the central government.

Party	Seats	+/–
People's Action Movement	5	New
United National Movement	1	New
Appointed members	3	New
Total	9	New
