= 1971 Nevis Local Council election =

Nevis Local Council election

- December 1971

All 9 seats on the Nevis Local Council
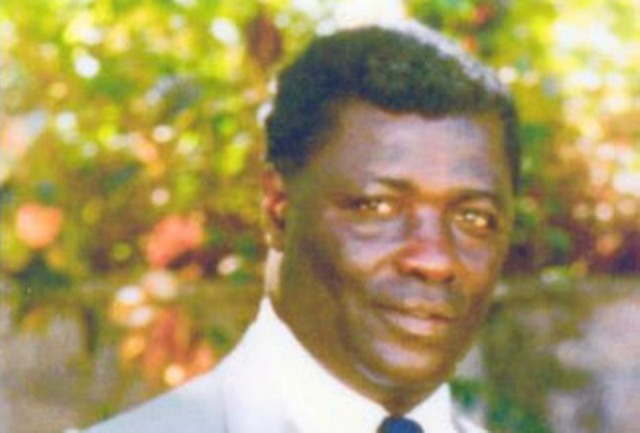
	First party	Second party
Leader	Simeon Daniel
Party	NRP	UNM
Last election	New	1 seat
Seats won	6	2
Seat change	New	▲1
Chairman of the Local Council before election
Fred Parris
Chairman of
the Local Council after election
Simeon Daniel
Nevis Reformation Party

An election was held for the Nevis Local Council in December 1971. The result saw the Nevis Reformation Party (NRP) win six out of nine available seats, with NRP leader Simeon Daniel becoming Chairman of the Local Council.

== Background ==
This was the second local election for the island of Nevis within Saint Christopher-Nevis-Anguilla, and the first local election held since reforms to the Local Government Act saw the number of elected members of the local council expanded from six to nine seats, and abolished the three nominated members, which controversially were appointed by the central Government. The previous and first ever election for the council in 1967 had delivered a majority for the People's Action Movement, who won 5 of 6 seats. However, the PAM opted not to run again in the 1971 election and stopped contesting elections on the island of Nevis from this point onwards.

== Campaign ==
Sentiment against Saint Kitts and the central government of Saint Christopher-Nevis-Anguilla was extremely high amongst Nevisians, and the newly founded Nevis Reformation Party (NRP) had become a leading voice in calling for independence from Saint Kitts since its establishment in 1970.

The PAM and Labour Party did not contest the election, however, the United National Movement (UNM) once again contested the council election, with the UNM often being described as an affiliate of Labour in Nevis.

== Results and elected members ==
The election saw the NRP win a majority with six seats, while the UNM came second with two seats, and an independent candidate won a seat. Notably, Fred Parris, the incumbent chairman of the local council and a prominent ex-PAM politician in Nevis, ran as an independent and lost his council seat to Simeon Daniel of the NRP. Only seven of the nine seats were contested, and voter turnout was 62.6%.

The following members were elected to the Nevis Local Council:

Nevis Local Council members
Party	Member
NRP	Simeon Daniel
NRP	Ivor Stevens
NRP	Eustace Nisbett
NRP	Zephaniah Liburd
NRP	James Brookes
NRP	Urial Swanston
UNM	Almon Nisbett
UNM	Rudolph Duporte
Ind.	Wilfred Maynard

== Aftermath ==
Following the election, Simeon Daniel, leader of the NRP, was elected Chairman of the Local Council.
