= This May Be Me =

- Cover of the "This May Be Me" single.

Single by Kossisko
- Released: February 17, 2015
- Recorded: Groove Room; San Rafael, California
- Genre: Alternative hip-hop
- Length: 3:42
- Label: Cutcraft Music Group, Inc
- Songwriters: Kossisko Konan; Joseph Waks; Anthony Calonico; Alex Talan
- Producers: Rare Times; Joe Wax

Music video
- "This May Be Me" on YouTube

"This May Be Me" is the debut single from the singer Kossisko, released on February 17, 2015.

== Music video ==
The video was directed by Adam Tillman-Young, and premiered on The Fader's website on February 17, 2015.

== Track listing ==
All lyrics are written by Kossisko Konan.

Digital single
No.	Title	Length
1.	"This May Be Me"	3:42
