= Carmen Rodgers =

American singer and songwriter

Carmen Rodgers is an American R&B, neo soul singer and songwriter, from Dallas, Texas, United States.

Rodgers was born in Mississippi, raised in Texas, and is now based in New York where she continues to work as a solo Recording Artist and songwriter/touring member of The Foreign Exchange. Additional collaborations include Zo!, Eric Roberson, and Anthony David. Her solo career was kicked off on the compilation album, Hidden Beach Recordings Presents Hidden Hits, Vol. 1 (2003), Rodgers was included singing "Ain't No Time". This was followed by further compilation appearances, as well as featuring on releases from Darryl Reeves, The Foreign Exchange, and Zo!.

Her solo output includes her debut, Free (2004), The Bitter Suite (2010),Stargazer (2015), and her most recent work Hello Human, Vol. 1 (2021). For the latter work Stargazer, AllMusic commented that "it's a distinctive, fully formed work—one of the most enjoyable mid-2010s R&B albums".

== Albums ==
- Free, (2004)
- The Bitter Suite, (2010)
- Stargazer, (2015)
- Hello Human, Vol. 1, (2021)
