= Adrian Daniel =

American singer (born 1990)

Adrian Daniels
- Born: August 25, 1990 (age 36); Brooklyn, NY
- Occupations: Singer/songwriter; music producer; choreographer
- Years active: 2014-present
- Musical career
- Genres: Pop R&B Neo soul
- Instruments: vocals; acoustic guitar
- Labels: Tommy Boy Entertainment; 1990 Records
- Website: www.adriandanielmusic.com
- Website: adriandanielmusic.com/

Adrian Nelson-Daniels (born August 25, 1990), better known by his stage name Adrian Daniel, is an American singer, songwriter, and producer from Brooklyn, New York of African descent. Daniel has released five EPs and four albums: Fool (2014), Disillusions (2016), FLAWD (2018), and Nightwolf (2020). and Requiem. Daniel's music is described by BET and Okayplayer as Neo-Soul and Pop R&B

== Early life ==
Daniel was born and grew up in East Flatbush and Brownsville, Brooklyn. He attended Boys and Girls High School and later transferred to Brownsville Academy. Daniel refers to his experience growing up in a Baptist church singing in the choir and as a young choreographer at the Harlem School of dance as influencing his music. Among his music influences is Michael Jackson, Coldplay, Lauren Hill, Kanye West.

== Career ==
In September 2014, Daniel signed a record deal releasing his first official single from the FKKKING HIGH EP with Tommy Boy Entertainment. In February 2016, Daniel released "Devoted". In June 2016, Daniel released his first LP, Disillusions. with 1990 Records. In 2018, Daniel released FLAWD his second album. In 2020 during the covid pandemic, Daniel released Nightwolf his third full length album. In 2020 following the release of Nightwolf he was selected to perford at Madison Square Garden Uncovered Showcase. In 2022, Daniel released Requiem hi8s fourth album. He has toured overseas and in the U.S. including opening for Grammy nominated artists Louis the Child and Jidenna. In 2025, Daniel released Wolf Pack EP. Upon its release, Wolf Pack Vol 1 achieved initial digital download momentum, with peaks of #6 on the US iTunes New Albums R&B/Soul charts and #48 on the United Kingdom iTunes New Albums R&B/Soul, Pop. According to Songstats music analytics, as of 2026 its independent catalogue had succeeded 50 million streams and over 200 million views

== Discography ==
LPs, EPs and Singles
Title	Released	Type	Chart position
FKKKING HIGH	2014	EP	-
FOOL	2014	EP	-
Euphoria	2015	EP	-
PRIDE	2015	LP - Disillusion	-
Devoted	2016	LP - Disillusion	-
Havoc	2018	LP - FLAWD	-
Open Up	2018	LP - FLAWD	-
This City	2018	LP - FLAWD	-
Deadly Attraction	2018	LP - FLAWD	-
Near You	2019	Single	-
NightWolf	2020	LP	#90 iTunes Global/US

Wolf Cry 2021 Single -

Midnight 2021 EP -

Reason 2021 Single -

Requiem 2022 Album -

You Slay Me 2022 Single -

51 Ways 2022 Single -

Crimson 2022 EP -

On & On 2023 Single -

Never Again 2024 Single -

Flamethrower 2024 Single -

Energy 2025 Single -

Pretty Lies 2025 Single -

Down 2025 Single -

Wolf Pack Vol 1 2025 EP -

What Is Forever 2026 Single -

Guest appearances
Title	Released	Type	Artist	Label
Feel Me	2019	Single	NAWMS	NAWMS
Lotta Praise	2019	Album	Radamiz	PayDay Records

Endings Are Beginnings 2020 Single Moe Aly TGR Music Group

I'm a Mess 2020 Single Asiah -

Body 2021 Single Purpleheart Fire Years Records

51 Ways 2022 Single Durs,Blazy SpinTwist Records

No Love to Spare 2022 Album C. Henry -

Venom 2023 Album Angelicca -

Soul on Fire 2024 Single Purpleheart Fire Years Records

Soundtracks
Title	Film	Details
Feel me	Kim's Convenience, Season 5 Soundtrack	Netflix, Canadian Broadcast Network October 2020
90's Girls	FBoy Island Season 1 Episode 106	HBO/MAX August 2021
Deadly Attraction	FBoy Island Season 1 Episode 105	HBO/MAX August 2021
Stuck in My Ways	FBoy Island Season 1 Episode 110	HBO/MAX August 2021
