= 1977 Nevis independence referendum =

- 18 August 1977

Results
Choice	Votes	%
Yes	4,193	99.67%
No	14	0.33%
Valid votes	4,207	99.69%
Invalid or blank votes	13	0.31%
Total votes	4,220	100.00%

An unofficial independence referendum was held in Nevis on 18 August 1977. It was organised by the Nevis Reformation Party and sought for the island of Nevis to separate from St Kitts prior to independence and remain within the British Empire as a separate Crown colony, similar to Anguilla, which had seceded from Saint Christopher-Nevis-Anguilla in 1967.

Although 99.66% voting in favour, the result was declared invalid by the national government.

== Results ==
Choice	Votes	%
For	4,193	99.67
Against	14	0.33
Total	4,207	100.00
Valid votes	4,207	99.69
Invalid/blank votes	13	0.31
Total votes	4,220	100.00
Source: Direct Democracy

== Aftermath ==
The constitution proclaimed at the independence of Saint Kitts and Nevis in 1983 contained Article 113, giving Nevis the right to unilaterally secede if a referendum resulted in a two-thirds majority. A 1998 referendum resulted in 62% voting in favour of independence, but required a two-thirds majority in favour and did not succeed.
