= Kossisko =

American rapper (born 1991/92)

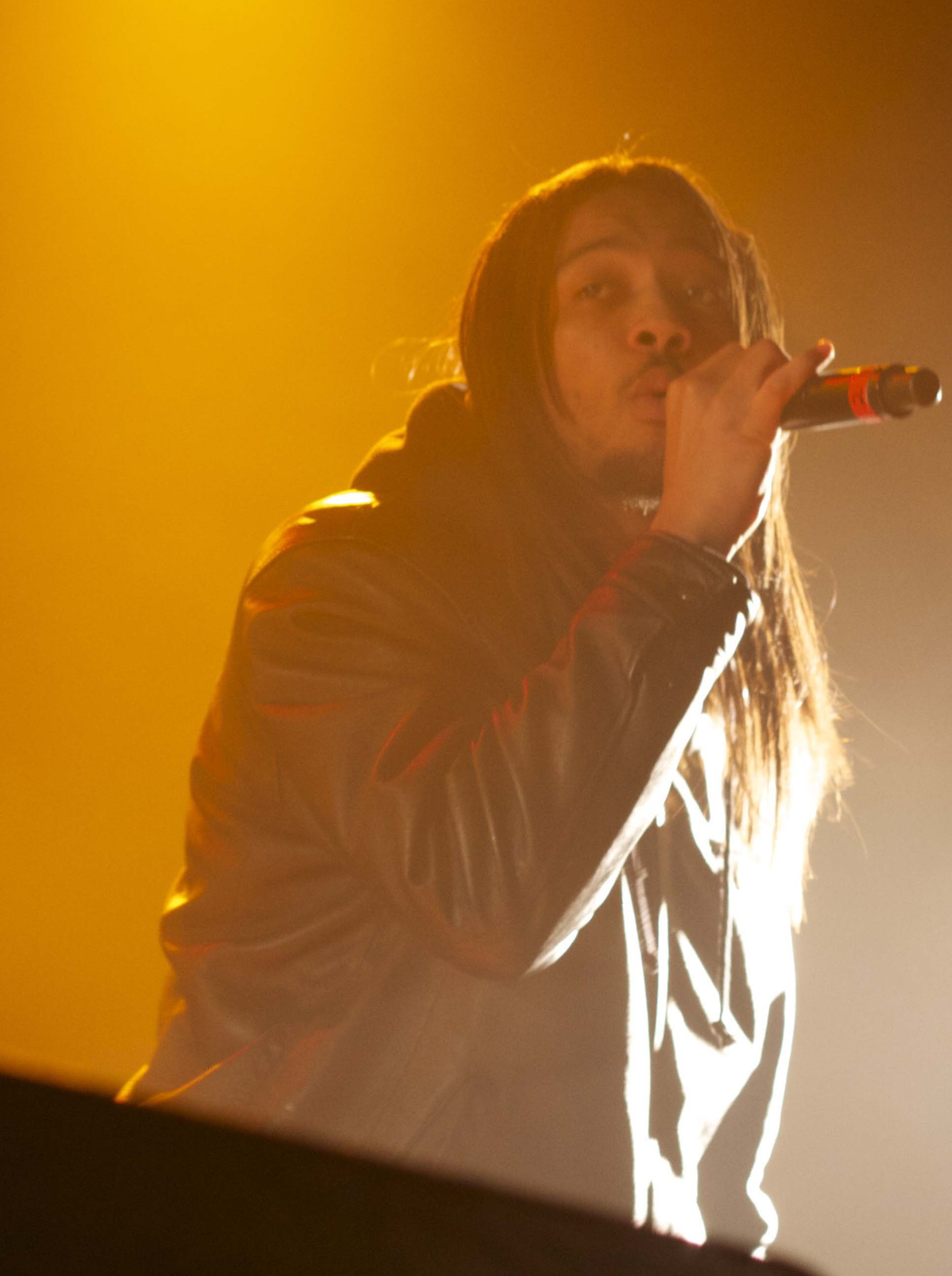

Background information
- Also known as: 100s (formerly)
- Born: Kossisko Konan
- Origin: Berkeley, California, U.S.
- Genres: Alternative hip-hop; R&B; hip-hop; G-funk
- Occupations: Singer, rapper, songwriter
- Years active: 2010–present
- Labels: Ice Cold Ivory, Fool's Gold Records, Cutcraft Music Group
- Website: www.kossisko.com

Kossisko Konan (born 1991/1992), known mononymously as Kossisko and formerly known as 100s, is an American singer and rapper from Berkeley, California. In 2012, Kossisko, as rapper 100s, released their debut mixtape Ice Cold Perm. They were signed to Fool's Gold Records in June 2013. Following the release of the single "Ten Freaky Hoes", it was announced that Kossisko would be releasing their second mixtape, an EP titled Ivry, which was released on March 7, 2014, via Fool's Gold. It featured a greater g-funk and disco influence than their debut mixtape. At the start of 2015, they retired the 100s persona and now performs under the name Kossisko (which is their birth name). As Kossisko, they released their first single "This May Be Me" on February 17, 2015. The track was premiered by The Fader. Later that year, Kossisko released their debut EP, Red White N Cruel. In 2016, Kossisko launched a crowdfunding campaign to help fund their work on a short horror film titled '2037.'

== Early life ==
Kossisko was born to a Jewish mother and African father. They were raised in Berkeley, California. At age 16, due to disciplinary issues, they were sent by their father to a remote boarding school in Abidjan, inside the Ivory Coast. Kossisko was told that the Africa trip was a vacation, but was left at the school indefinitely. At the boarding school, Kossisko lived in a three-bedroom house with 15 people. They contracted malaria five times. At one point, Kossisko ran away from the boarding school and fled to the local American embassy. Despite Kossisko's pleas, their parents refused to allow them to return to the U.S., and because they were under the age of 18, they had to remain in Ivory Coast. After their attempt at escape, they were sent to the small town of Bouaflé where they lived with their uncle. Not long after, they moved with their uncle's family to Yamoussoukro. While in Ivory Coast, they learned to speak French. Kossisko returned to the United States in late 2010.

== Career ==
Kossisko wrote their first song in 2008 and recorded for the first time in early 2010. They began to take rapping seriously in 2011 at the age of 19. Following their stay in the Ivory Coast, Kossisko moved back to Berkeley where they began recording his debut mixtape as 100s titled, Ice Cold Perm. On September 5, 2012, 100s released Ice Cold Perm, which was produced largely by Joe Wax. The cover artwork was inspired by the cover of Snoop Dogg's Tha Doggfather, which Kossisko called a classic album. On the mixtape they also collaborated with Main Attrakionz and Ryan Hemsworth. Brandon Soderberg of Spin commented on it saying, "This is snarling, no-nonsense pimp-rap, celebrating exploitation and preemptively lashing out at everyone trying to get anything over on 100s, but it finds a way to complicate those regressive, retro sensibilities". On October 18, 2012, the Noisey subsidiary of Vice premiered the music video for "Brick Sell Phone".

In an interview with Vice later that month, Kossisko said their next project would be titled Sex Symbols, which they had already started recording. They described it as different saying, "It's more influenced by R&B. I've got some singers on there. It's going to be more funky, too. What I wanted to do, as best as I could, was have a fusion between [19]90s mack-rap and late [19]80s pop and soul. Something like Bobby Brown or Rick James." On January 23, 2013, Ice Cold Perm was released for digital download. In early 2013, they went on the Group Hug Tour with Kreayshawn, then performed five shows at 2013's SXSW.

On June 4, 2013, 100s released the music video for "1999". This was followed by the announcement of their signing to A-Trak's Fool's Gold Records later that week. The following month Complex named him a new rapper to watch out for. His song "Life of a Mack" was featured on the video game Grand Theft Auto V, on the station Radio Los Santos. Off the popularity it gained from appearing in the game, 100s released it on September 17, 2013, as their debut single. Around the same time they was featured in an iPhone 5c commercial. Then from October to December 11, 2013, 100s toured with ASAP Ferg on the Turnt x Burnt concert tour. While on tour they released "Keep a Bitch Broke", a new collaboration with Aston Matthews, Joey Fatts and Da$h. They were named one of the ten West Coast rappers to watch for during 2014 by The BoomBox.

On February 26, 2014, 100s released the song "Ten Freaky Hoes" and revealed that they would be releasing a free EP titled Ivry, replacing the previously announced Sex Symbols. "Ten Freaky Hoes" is a "melodic G-funk jam that adds a dose of Californian psychedelia to his formerly frozen atmospherics." Ivry was subsequently set for a March 2014 release. "Ten Freaky Hoes", is also most notably the song that ended the existence of 100s, with a short letter from the artist placed at the end of the music video saying, "To the 100s fans, I appreciate each and everyone of you but its now time for me to count my journey. So this is goodbye. -Kossisko". The EP was then released on March 6, 2014, by Fool's Gold, being premiered by The Fader. It was met with positive reviews from music critics including writers for The Fader, The Washington Post, Stereogum and Fact. Writing for Now, Julia Leconte said "It will make you smile till your face hurts as you press repeat for the 16th time, but to steal one of his song titles, 100s isn't "fuckin around." He presents himself with sophistication, and you take him seriously as a legit mack rapper rather than a farcical Snoop Dogg type wearing ridiculous oversize velvet or fur." Nick Catucci of Entertainment Weekly credited Kossisko for bring back g-funk.

In a 2016 interview, Kossisko described feeling "reborn" after they retired the 100s character and reinvented themselves as Kossisko. They also explained that their work as 100s was partially related to anger towards their mother after the traumatic experience of being sent to Africa.

== Personal life ==
In March 2024, Kossisko said in an interview that they identify as non-binary and use they/them pronouns.

== Cultural influence ==
Marvel Comics honored the artistry of Kossisko as 100s by remixing the cover of IVRY as a marketing tool for the comic book studios latest project.

== Discography ==
=== as Kossisko ===
List of Releases
Title	Release details
This May Be Me	Released: February 17, 2015; Label: Self-released; Format: Digital download (Single)
Own Me	Released: June 15, 2015; Label: Self-released; Format: Digital download (Single)
Jealousy	Released: June 15, 2015; Label: Self-released; Format: Digital download (Single)
Red White N Cruel	Released: November 13, 2015; Label: Self-released; Format: Digital download (EP)
LOW	Released: May 3, 2019; Label: Active Frequencies / EMPIRE; Format: Digital download (Album)
Uptown Top Ranking (single) as featured in the film Native Son	Released: April 6, 2019; Label: Cutcraft Music Group; Format: Digital download (single)
The End featuring G-Eazy (single)	Released: April 28, 2020; Label: Kossisko / Red Stairway; Format: Digital download (single)
Good Thing (single)	Released: October 2, 2020; Label: Kossisko / Red Stairway; Format: Digital download (single)
World of Trouble (single)	Released: December 11, 2020; Label: Kossisko / Red Stairway; Format: Digital download (single)
Lil Red Rari (single)	Released: February 19, 2021; Label: Kossisko / Red Stairway; Format: Digital download (single)
World of Trouble	Released: March 4, 2022; Label: Kossisko / Red Stairway Records; Format: Digital download (Album)

Slay Released September 8, 2023

=== as 100s ===
List of mixtapes
Title	Album details
Ice Cold Perm	Released: September 5, 2012; Label: Self-released; Format: Digital download
Life of a Mack (single)	Released: 2013; Release: Grand Theft Auto V Soundtrack; Label: Fool's Gold Records; Format: Digital download
Ivry	Released: March 7, 2014; Label: Fool's Gold Records; Format: Digital download

=== Singles ===
As featured artist

Title	Year	Release title
"Bankrobber" (featuring Kossisko) by Rainy Milo	2014	This Thing Of Ours (album)
"Jealou$y" (featuring Kossisko and Casey Veggies) by The Neighbourhood	2014	#000000 & #FFFFFF (album)
"304" (featuring Kossisko) by ALLBLACK	2019	"304" (single)
"All The Things You're Searching For" (featuring Kossisko and Ashley Benson) by G-Eazy	2020	"Everything's Strange Here" (album)
"Running Wild (Tumblr Girls 2)" (featuring Kossisko) by G-Eazy	2021	"These Things Happen Too" (album)

== Filmography ==
=== Television ===
Year	Title	Role	Notes
2019	Euphoria	DJ	Episode: "'03 Bonnie and Clyde"
2021	Sex/Life	Kossi	
