= Simeon Daniel =

The Right Excellent Simeon Daniel
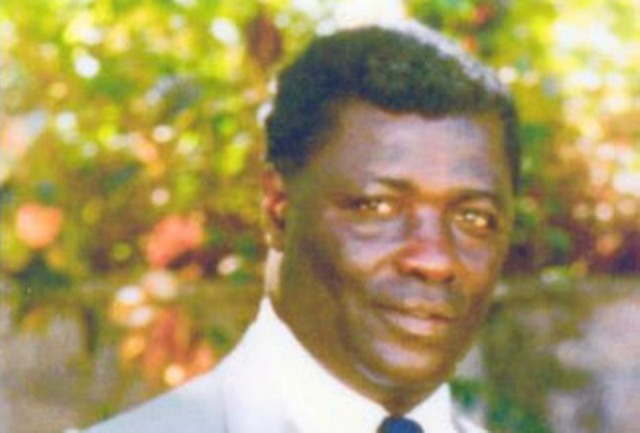

1st Premier of Nevis
- In office 19 September 1983 – 2 June 1992
- Preceded by: Office created
- Succeeded by: Vance Amory

Leader of the Nevis Reformation Party
- In office 1970–1992
- Preceded by: Party created
- Succeeded by: Joseph Parry

Minister of Finance of Saint Kitts and Nevis
- In office February 1980 – 1983
- Prime Minister: Kennedy Simmonds
- Preceded by: Charles E. Mills
- Succeeded by: Richard Llewellyn Caines

Chairman of the Nevis Local Council
- In office 1972–1980

Personal details
- Born: 22 August 1934 Barnes Ghaut, Saint Thomas Lowland Parish, Nevis
- Died: 27 May 2012 (aged 77)
- Party: Nevis Reformation Party
- Spouse: Lady Sheila Daniel
- Children: Janice Daniel-Hodge Deon Daniel Adrian Daniel Susan Clarke Ingrid Farrell Clear Jones Anthony Daniel, deceased
- Education: Inner Temple of the Inns of Court in London

Simeon Daniel (22 August 1934 – 27 May 2012) was the first Premier of Nevis.

== Early life ==
Simeon Daniel was born at Barnes Ghaut Village in Saint Thomas Lowland Parish, Nevis, West Indies to Joseph Daniel and Melvina Daniel, née Archer. He received his early education at St. Thomas’ Government Elementary School in Nevis. He entered the teaching profession as a Pupil Teacher in 1950 and attained the Leeward Island Teachers’ Certificate in 1957.

== Career ==
In 1962, Daniel began his legal tutorial at the Council of Legal Education in England. While still a student (1960-1966) he worked as a clerk at the London County Council and later as an executive officer, and in 1965 received a recognition grant for outstanding meritorious work from the said Institution. He continued his education at the Inner Temple of the Inns of Court in London. In 1966 he became Barrister at Law and was called to the Bar in England.

He returned to Nevis in 1966 and served as assistant secretary in the Ministry of External Affairs and was admitted to the Local Bar that same year. The following year he was appointed Crown Counsel and later Registrar of the Supreme Court and Additional Magistrate in the State. He entered Private practice in 1969 in St. Kitts.

Daniel was among the founding members of a political party called the Nevis Reformation Party (NRP) in 1970.

He served as Chairman of the Local Council from 1972 to 1980 and was elected to the National Assembly in May 1975 and February 1980.

Following the formation of the coalition government of the People’s Action Movement of St. Kitts and the Nevis Reformation Party, Daniel assumed the portfolios of Minister of Finance and Nevis Affairs on 19 February 1980. He gained Home Rule for Nevis under the Independence Constitution in September 1983.

Daniel was the first Premier of Nevis from 19 September 1983 (Independence Day) to 2 June 1992. His successor was Vance Amory after his party Concerned Citizens' Movement (CCM) won the election in 1992. Daniel retired from active politics in 1992.

He established the Bank of Nevis Ltd. in 1985.

Daniel, Brantley & Associates is a full service law firm that represents numerous businesses and individuals in St. Kitts & Nevis, Anguilla and throughout the region and internationally. The firm was founded by Daniel and was joined by Mark Brantley in 1996.

Daniel died on 27 May 2012 and was buried with full military honours.

== Awards ==
On 16 December 2013, acting on the advice of Denzil Douglas, St. Kitts and Nevis Governor-General Sir Edmund Lawrence announced that Dr. Daniel is being commended as National Hero.

- Doctor of Laws (Honorary), Marquis Giuseppe Scicluna International University Foundation, 1987;
- Albert Einstein Bronze Medal for Peace, Albert Einstein Bronze International Academy Foundation, 1987;
- Award of Commendation as Founder and Supporter of Bank Of Nevis Ltd.

Political offices
New office	Premier of Nevis; 1983–1992	Succeeded by Vance Amory
