= United National Movement (Saint Kitts-Nevis-Anguilla) =

The United National Movement was a Nevis-based political party in Saint Kitts-Nevis-Anguilla.

== History ==
The party represented Nevisian interests and opposed Saint Kitts' domination of the state. They first contested national elections in 1961, when they received 7% of the vote and won two seats. In 1962 the party's acting leader Eugene Walwyn led a delegation to request secession from Saint Kitts. However, he modified his stance and cooperated with the Labour Party to accept three-island statehood. In the 1966 elections their vote share fell to 6% and they lost one of their two seats. Following the elections Walwyn crossed the floor and received the position of attorney general from the Labour administration. From this point onwards the UNM closely co-operated with the Labour Party and were its coalition partner.

However, many Nevisians felt betrayed and abandoned by the UNM, and the People's Action Movement won the first Nevisian local council elections in 1967. In the 1971 elections their vote share dropped again, this time to 4% and they lost their sole seat. The party did not contest any further elections.

== Election results ==
=== General elections ===
Election	Votes	%	Nevis seats	+/–	Status
1961	876	7.23	2 / 2	New	Official opposition
1966	834	5.91	1 / 2	▼1	Coalition government
1971	647	4.44	0 / 2	▼1	Extra-parliamentary

=== Nevis Local Council ===
Election year	# of elected council seats won	+/–	Govt?	Ref.
1967	1 / 6	New	Opposition	
1971	2 / 9	▲1	Opposition	

== See also ==
- Nevis Reformation Party
