= Dakarai Gwitira =

Dakari
- Also known as: DG
- Born: Dakari Gwitira
- Origin: Zimbabwe
- Genres: Hip hop, pop, R&B
- Occupations: Record producer; songwriter; disc jockey
- Instruments: Keyboard, drum machine
- Years active: 2009–present

Dakarai Gwitira, known professionally as Dakari, is a Zimbabwe-born record producer, audio engineer, and DJ. He is best known for his work with American rapper G-Eazy, having contributed to each of his studio albums since When It's Dark Out (2015).

== Early life ==
Dakari immigrated to the U.S., specifically Dallas, Texas, at age 12. Creating noise in every which way possible, absorbing as much as he could, Dakari took that passion and turned it into a career. Before becoming a music-maker, Dakari grew up in Zimbabwe. “I was in to music but I never knew of it as a career path. My dad at the time lived here in the U.S. so he sent back a keyboard and I used to play on it. I couldn't record on it because it wasn't a sequence so I'd play a drum pattern and memorize it and be playing a beat in my head while I play a melody. I would pick it up and play with it for a month then I'd forget about it for a few months. Then I'd randomly come back to it and that's how it always was. That was music for me back then. Most Zimbabwean radio jams were sung in English, Dakari never understood the lyrics. It wasn't until he learned English later, that Dakari was able to really take his overall musical understanding to the next level and earn the career success and recognition to match.

As he settled into heart of America's south during his formative teenaged years, Dakari became obsessed with the back catalogues of Pharrell Williams, Outkast, Missy Elliott, and the type of futurist hip-hop that remains just as innovative today as it did in the early 2000s. To Dakari, those names all championed their own 'sound'. To a kid raised in Zimbabwe now living in Texas, making a life and career as a musician was an alien concept reserved for well connected industry types living on the East or West coast.

"I never thought of music as 'work' or something that people could make a living from." It wasn't until he witnessed Timbaland building hits on MTV's Making the Band that he really began to wrap his head around the possibility of making a career in music, pushing him towards a move to New York City. Ironically, his Making The Band-inspired drive proved prophetic.

== Early career ==
Dakari's career would not be where it is today had he not made initial strides to go beyond his passions for Hip hop and R&B. Leaving Texas and moving to New York offered Dakari opportunities to expand. "I had a very specific idea of what 'dope' was, and I had a lot of judgement toward music but New York taught me to let go of all that," he says now, looking back. A Brazilian roommate introduced him to the Latin-tinged rhythms of South America and he found everyday influence in the bodegas and back alleys hidden amidst the concrete jungle. Before names like hit the upper pop echelons, Dakari had established his working relationship with them. Spending more and more time at the legendary Quad Studios, Dakari became head engineer, working with a plethora of superstar and soon-to-be-superstars ranging including names like DJ Khaled, Akon, Meek Mill, Nelly, Ne-Yo, Sara Bareilles, Meghan Trainor and Ashanti.

== Career (2015–present) ==
In 2015, Dakari picked up his bags for the last time and moved to Los Angeles to work closely with G-Eazy, and three years later he has never looked back. "Within the first 10 seconds [of meeting G-Eazy and hearing him rap], I knew I was going to work with this guy."

Dakari was credited as an engineer for G-Eazy's 2015 album, When It's Dark Out, and mixed its lead single, "Me, Myself & I". Afterward, Dakari became one of G-Eazy's main engineers, with addition production responsibilities. Following his 2017 album The Beautiful & Damned, Dakari continued on the boards both as an engineer, and as a producer on its title track with Zoe Nash and "Sober" with Charlie Puth.

In 2018, he announced that [he is working on] "a DJ/Producer project. I just wanna release my version of dope and connect with the people that connect with what I like. That's what being an artist is, really, that enough people like your music. What I've kind of realized is just that sometimes other people's version of dope and my [version of dope] just doesn't match. I'm not trying to be old and have a bunch of music I thought was dope and it never existed because I never placed it with an artist or because it didn't click with somebody in the business." He released his debut single, "Enough" (featuring G-Eazy, Tommy Genesis and Jozzy) in November of that year.

== Discography ==
Artist	Song	Album	Credits
G-Eazy	Intro (When It's Dark Out)	When It's Dark Out	Engineer
G-Eazy x Bebe Rexha	Me, Myself & I	When It's Dark Out	Engineer
G-Eazy	Still	Single	Producer/Writer
G-Eazy	The Beautiful & Damned (ft. Zoe Nash)	The Beautiful & Damned	Producer/Writer/Engineer
G-Eazy	Charles Brown (ft. E-40, Jay Ant)	The Beautiful & Damned	Engineer
G-Eazy	Eazy (ft. Son Lux)	The Beautiful & Damned	Producer/Writer/Engineer
G-Eazy	Fly Away (ft. Ugochi)	The Beautiful & Damned	Producer/Writer/Engineer
G-Eazy	Him & I (ft. Halsey)	The Beautiful & Damned	Engineer
G-Eazy	Leviathan (ft. Sam Martin)	The Beautiful & Damned	Producer/Writer/Engineer
G-Eazy	Love Is Gone (ft. Drew Love)	The Beautiful & Damned	Producer/Writer/Engineer
G-Eazy	Pick Me Up (ft. Anna of the North)	The Beautiful & Damned	Producer/Writer/Engineer
G-Eazy	The Plan	The Beautiful & Damned	Producer/Writer/Engineer
G-Eazy	Sober (ft. Charlie Puth)	The Beautiful & Damned	Producer/Writer/Engineer
G-Eazy	Summer In December	The Beautiful & Damned	Producer/Writer/Engineer
G-Eazy	That's A Lot	The Beautiful & Damned	Producer/Writer/Engineer
G-Eazy	Mama Always Told Me (ft. Madison Love)	The Beautiful & Damned	Producer/Writer/Engineer
G-Eazy	But A Dream	The Beautiful & Damned	Producer/Writer/Engineer
G-Eazy	Pray For Me	The Beautiful & Damned	Producer/Writer/Engineer
G-Eazy	Crash & Burn (ft. Kehlani)	The Beautiful & Damned	Producer/Writer/Engineer
G-Eazy	Eyes Closed (ft. Johnny Yukon)	Single	Producer/Writer/Engineer
G-Eazy	Just Friends (ft. phem)	Single	Producer/Writer/Engineer
G-Eazy	Shake It Up (ft. E-40, MadeinTYO, 24hrs)	Single	Producer/Writer/Engineer
G-Eazy	Wave (ft. Rexx Life Raj)	Single	Producer/Writer/Engineer
G-Eazy	Special Love (ft. Dakari)	Single	Featured Artist/Producer/Writer/Engineer
G-Eazy	Rewind (ft. Anthony Russo)	Single	Engineer
G-Eazy	My Next Fix	Single	Producer/Writer
G-Eazy	Bad Boy	Single	Producer/Writer
Emmit Fenn	Want It	Prologue	Writer
G-Eazy	Endless Summer Freestyle (ft. YG)	Single	Producer
Yuri	Illusion	Single	Producer
Dakari	Enough (ft. G-Eazy, Tommy Genesis, & Jo'zzy)	Single	Primary Artist/Producer
