= Normani discography =

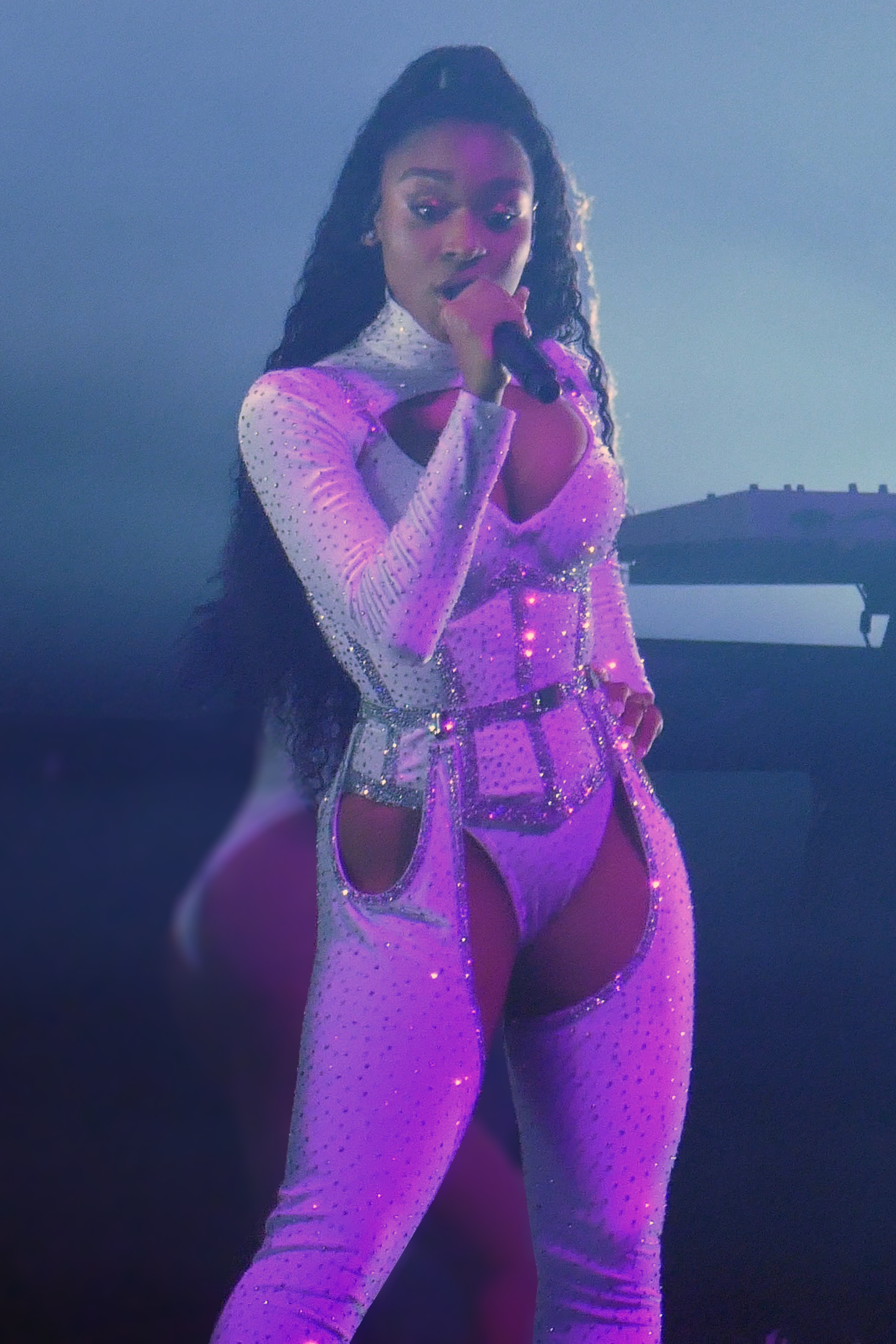
- Normani in 2019
- Studio albums: 1
- EPs: 1
- Singles: 11
- Music videos: 7
- Promotional singles: 1

American singer Normani has released one studio album, one extended play, eleven singles (including three as featured artist), one promotional single, and seven music videos. In 2012, she auditioned as a solo artist for the second season of The X Factor. After being eliminated as a solo performer, Normani was brought back into the competition, along with four other girls, to form the girl band Fifth Harmony. During her time in the group, Normani and her bandmates released the albums Better Together (2013), Reflection (2015), 7/27 (2016), and Fifth Harmony (2017).

In early August 2017, Normani was featured as a cameo in R&B singer Khalid's music video for "Young Dumb & Broke". Two months later, it was announced that she had signed to management company S10 Entertainment as a solo artist. In February 2018, Normani and Khalid released the single "Love Lies", recorded for the soundtrack of the romantic teen film, Love, Simon. The single debuted at number 43 on the US Billboard Hot 100, scoring the highest first-week position for a single by a girl group member. It became a sleeper hit, reaching number nine after charting for 28 weeks.

In April 2018, it was announced that Normani had signed to Keep Cool/RCA Records for her solo debut album. In August 2018, Normani was featured on Jessie Reyez's remix of her single "Body Count" alongside Kehlani. In October 2018, she released the songs "Checklist" and "Slow Down" with Calvin Harris as part of the two-track EP Normani x Calvin Harris. She released the single "Waves" featuring 6lack in November 2018 after performing it at the Tidal X Brooklyn concert in October. In January 2019, Normani released "Dancing with a Stranger" with singer-songwriter Sam Smith. The song became the most-played song of 2019 on radio worldwide. Her single "Motivation" was released on August 16, 2019. In June 2024, she released her debut studio album Dopamine, which was led by the singles "1:59" (featuring Gunna) and "Candy Paint", as well as the previously released single "Wild Side".

== Studio albums ==
List of studio albums, with selected details and chart positions
Title	Details	Peak chart positions		
Title	Details	US	US R&B/HH	UK DL
Dopamine	Released: June 14, 2024; Label: RCA; Format: Digital download, streaming	91	30	45

== Extended plays ==
List of extended plays, with selected details
Title	Details
Normani x Calvin Harris (with Calvin Harris)	Released: October 22, 2018; Label: RCA, Keep Cool; Format: Digital download, streaming

== Singles ==
=== As lead artist ===
List of singles as lead artist, with selected chart positions and certifications, showing year released and album name
Title	Year	Peak chart positions										Certifications	Album
Title	Year	US	US R&B	AUS	CAN	DEN	IRE	NL	NZ	SWE	UK	Certifications	Album
"Love Lies" (with Khalid)	2018	9	—	3	21	9	9	24	2	12	12	RIAA: 5× Platinum; ARIA: 4× Platinum; BPI: 2× Platinum; GLF: Platinum; IFPI DEN: Platinum; MC: 4× Platinum; RMNZ: 6× Platinum	Love, Simon
"Waves" (with 6lack)	2018	— (Note: "Waves" did not enter the Billboard Hot 100, but peaked at number 33 on the Rhythmic chart.)	19	—	—	—	—	—	— (Note: "Waves" did not enter the NZ Top 40 Singles Chart, but peaked at number 36 on the NZ Hot Singles Chart.)	—	—		Non-album single
"Dancing with a Stranger" (with Sam Smith)	2019	7	—	6	8	3	4	6	7	8	3	RIAA: 4× Platinum; ARIA: 8× Platinum; BPI: 3× Platinum; GLF: 2× Platinum; IFPI DEN: Gold; MC: 4× Platinum; RMNZ: 5× Platinum	Love Goes
"Motivation"	2019	33	—	28	24	—	20	24	22	— (Note: "Motivation" did not enter the Swedish Singellista Chart, but peaked at number 12 on the Swedish Heatseeker Chart.)	27	RIAA: Platinum; ARIA: Platinum; BPI: Gold; MC: Gold; RMNZ: 2× Platinum	Non-album single
"Diamonds" (with Megan Thee Stallion)	2020	— (Note: "Diamonds" did not enter the Billboard Hot 100, but peaked at number 16 on the Bubbling Under Hot 100 chart.)	—	—	—	—	—	—	— (Note: "Diamonds" did not enter the NZ Top 40 Singles Chart, but peaked at number 23 on the NZ Hot Singles Chart.)	—	—		Birds of Prey: The Album
"Wild Side" (featuring Cardi B)	2021	14	3	—	59	—	77	—	— (Note: "Wild Side" did not enter the NZ Top 40 Singles Chart, but peaked at number six on the NZ Hot Singles Chart.)	—	49	RIAA: Gold; BPI: Silver; MC: Gold; RMNZ: Gold	Dopamine
"Fair"	2022	— (Note: "Fair" did not enter the Billboard Hot 100, but peaked at number 15 on the Bubbling Under Hot 100 chart.)	14	—	—	—	—	—	— (Note: "Fair" did not enter the NZ Top 40 Singles Chart, but peaked at number 33 on the NZ Hot Singles Chart.)	—	—		Non-album single
"New to You" (with Calvin Harris, Tinashe and Offset)	2022	—	—	—	—	—	—	—	— (Note: "New to You" did not enter the NZ Top 40 Singles Chart, but peaked at number 15 on the NZ Hot Singles Chart.)	—	—		Funk Wav Bounces Vol. 2
"1:59" (featuring Gunna)	2024	—	16	—	—	—	—	—	— (Note: "1:59" did not enter the NZ Top 40 Singles Chart, but peaked at number 15 on the NZ Hot Singles Chart.)	—	—		Dopamine
"Candy Paint"	2024	—	13	—	—	—	—	—	— (Note: "Candy Paint" did not enter the NZ Top 40 Singles Chart, but peaked at number 34 on the NZ Hot Singles Chart.)	—	—		Dopamine
"All Yours"	2024	—	16	—	—	—	—	—	— (Note: "All Yours" did not enter the NZ Top 40 Singles Chart, but peaked at number 31 on the NZ Hot Singles Chart.)	—	—		Dopamine
"—" denotes a release that did not chart or were not released in that territory.

=== As featured artist ===
List of singles as featured artist, showing year released and album name
Title	Year	Album
"Body Count" (Remix) (Jessie Reyez featuring Normani and Kehlani)	2018	Being Human in Public
"Don't They" (Remix) (Josh Levi featuring Normani)	2022	Disc Two
"Ecstasy" (Remix) (Ciara featuring Normani & Teyana Taylor)	2025	Non-album single

== Other charted songs ==
List of other charted songs, with selected chart positions, showing year released and album name
Title	Year	Peak chart positions							Album
Title	Year	US Bub.	US D/E	AUS	CAN	IRE	SWE	UK	Album
"Checklist" (with Calvin Harris featuring Wizkid)	2018	—	—	—	—	76	—	98	Normani x Calvin Harris
"Slow Down" (with Calvin Harris)	2018	—	37	—	—	—	—	—	Normani x Calvin Harris
"Bad to You" (with Ariana Grande and Nicki Minaj)	2019	4	—	63	82	35	77	51	Charlie's Angels
"—" denotes a release that did not chart or were not released in that territory.

== Guest appearances ==
List of other appearances, showing year released, other artist(s) credited and album name
Title	Year	Other artist(s)	Album
"Swing"	2018	Quavo, Davido	Quavo Huncho
"$$$"	2024	Gunna	One of Wun
"Personal"	2024	Khalid	Sincere (Deluxe)

== Songwriting credits ==
List of songwriting credits, with artists, showing year released and album name
Title	Year	Artist(s)	Album	Credits
"Don't Wanna Dance Alone"	2013	Fifth Harmony	Better Together (Note: Also credited on the Spanish, acoustic, and remix versions of the tracks on their respective albums.)	Co-writer
"Who Are You"	2013	Fifth Harmony	Better Together	Co-writer
"Me & My Girls"	2013	Fifth Harmony	Better Together	Co-writer
"All in My Head (Flex)"	2016	Fifth Harmony	7/27	Co-writer
"Sauced Up"	2017	Fifth Harmony	Fifth Harmony	Co-writer
"Make You Mad"	2017	Fifth Harmony	Fifth Harmony	Co-writer
"Lonely Night"	2017	Fifth Harmony	Fifth Harmony	Co-writer
"Messy"	2017	Fifth Harmony	Fifth Harmony	Co-writer
"Bridges"	2017	Fifth Harmony	Fifth Harmony	Co-writer
"Bounce Back"	2019	Little Mix	Confetti (Japanese deluxe edition)	Co-writer

== Music videos ==
List of music videos, showing year released, other artist(s) credited and director(s)
Title	Year	Other artist(s)	Director
As lead artist
"Love Lies"	2018	Khalid	Gerard Bush and Christopher Renz
"Dancing with a Stranger"	2019	Sam Smith	Vaughan Arnell
"Waves"	2019	6lack	Emil Nava
"Motivation"	2019	None	Dave Meyers and Daniel Russell
"Diamonds"	2020	Megan Thee Stallion	Unknown
"Wild Side"	2021	Cardi B	Tanu Muino
"Fair" (Visualizer)	2022	None	Unknown
"Personal" (Visualizer)	2024	Khalid	Unknown
Guest appearances
"Young Dumb & Broke"	2017	Khalid	Calmatic
"WAP"	2020	Cardi B featuring Megan Thee Stallion	Colin Tilley
"Don't They"	2020	Josh Levi	Blair Caldwell and Éli Sokhn
"Family Ties"	2021	Baby Keem and Kendrick Lamar	Dave Free
"WE (Warm Embrace)"	2022	Chris Brown	Arrad
