= List of awards and nominations received by Normani =

Normani awards and nominations
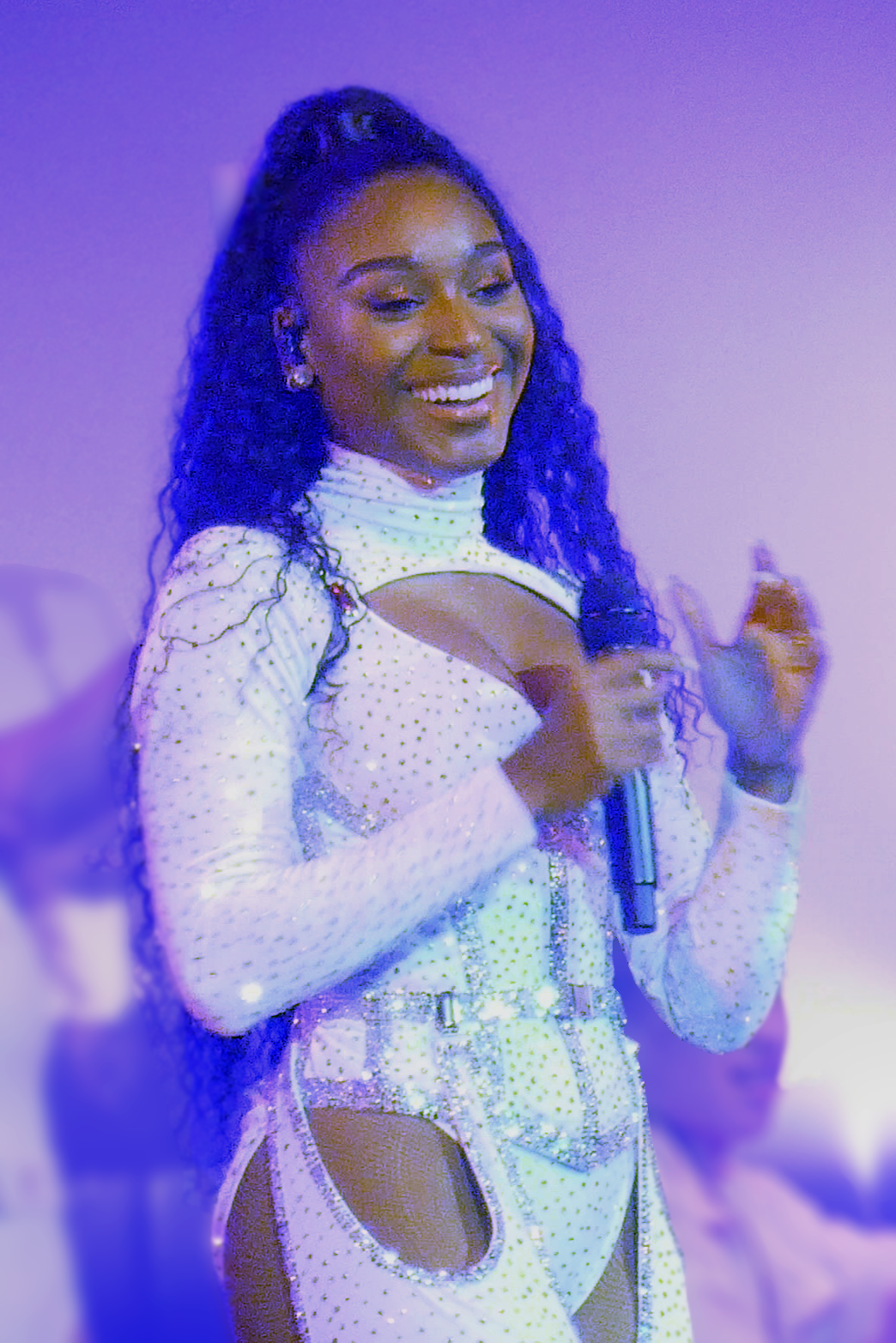
- Normani performing in December 2019
Awards and nominations
| Award | Wins | Nominations |
| Billboard Music Awards | 0 | 2 |
| Black Reel Awards | 0 | 1 |
| BMI Awards | 8 | 8 |
| Brit Awards | 0 | 1 |
| Clio Awards | 6 | 8 |
| Clio Music Awards | 3 | 3 |
| D&AD Awards | 3 | 7 |
| iHeartRadio Music Awards | 0 | 4 |
| iHeartRadio Titanium Awards | 2 | 2 |
| Ivor Novello Awards | 0 | 1 |
| MTV Europe Music Award | 0 | 1 |
| MTV Video Music Award | 1 | 6 |
| MTV Video Play Awards | 1 | 1 |
| NAACP Image Awards | 0 | 1 |
| NME Awards | 0 | 1 |
| People's Choice Awards | 0 | 2 |
| Shorty Awards | 0 | 1 |
| Soul Train Music Awards | 1 | 4 |
| Teen Choice Awards | 1 | 4 |
| The One Show Awards | 12 | 12 |
| UK Music Video Awards | 1 | 1 |
| Variety's Hitmakers Awards | 1 | 1 |
| W Magazine Award | 1 | 1 |
| Webby Awards | 1 | 3 |

Totals (Note: Certain award groups do not simply award one winner. They acknowledge several different recipients, have runners-up, and have third place. Since this is a specific recognition and is different from losing an award, runner-up mentions are considered wins in this award tally. For simplification and to avoid errors, each award in this list has been presumed to have had a prior nomination.)
- Wins: 45
- Nominations: 82

American singer and dancer Normani has received multiple awards and nominations. During her time as member of the girl group Fifth Harmony, Normani received multiple awards including two BMI awards for "All in My Head (Flex)" from their album 7/27. In 2017, Normani competed in season 24 of Dancing with the Stars, finishing in third place. As a soloist, she has earned eight BMI Awards, two iHeartRadio Titanium Awards, an MTV Video Music Award, a Soul Train Music Award, a Teen Choice Award and a Webby Award. She has also been nominated at the Brit Awards, the NAACP Image Awards and the Billboard Music Awards.

== Awards and nominations ==
Name of the award ceremony, year presented, award category, nominee(s) of the award, and the result of the nomination
| Award ceremony | Year | Category | Nominee(s)/work(s) | Result | Ref. |
|---|---|---|---|---|---|
| Billboard Music Awards | 2019 | Top Collaboration | "Love Lies" | Nominated | |
| Billboard Music Awards | 2019 | Top Radio Song | "Love Lies" | Nominated | |
| Black Reel Awards | 2019 | Best Original or Adapted Song | "Love Lies" | Nominated | |
| BMI London Awards | 2017 | Pop Award Songs | "All in My Head (Flex)" (Note: The award was presented to each member of Fifth Harmony individually.) | Won | |
| BMI London Awards | 2020 | Song of the Year | "Dancing with a Stranger" | Won | |
| BMI London Awards | 2020 | Pop Award Songs | "Dancing with a Stranger" | Won | |
| BMI London Awards | 2022 | Million Awards: 4 Million | "Dancing with a Stranger" | Won | |
| BMI Pop Awards | 2018 | Award Winning Songs | "All in My Head (Flex)" (Note: The award was presented to each member of Fifth Harmony individually.) | Won | |
| BMI Pop Awards | 2019 | Award Winning Songs | "Love Lies" | Won | |
| BMI Pop Awards | 2020 | Award Winning Songs | "Dancing with a Stranger" | Won | |
| BMI R&B/Hip Hop Awards | 2022 | Award Winning Songs | "Wild Side" | Won | |
| Brit Awards | 2020 | Brit Award for Song of the Year | "Dancing with a Stranger" | Nominated | |
| Clio Awards | 2022 | Social Media - Social Video | Google: Black-owned Friday (Note: The award was presented to Google, and was shared with Normani, who is credited as an artist.) | Grand | |
| Clio Awards | 2022 | Branded Entertainment - Audio | Google: Black-owned Friday | Silver | |
| Clio Awards | 2022 | Branded Entertainment - Film Scripted | Google: Black-owned Friday | Silver | |
| Clio Awards | 2022 | Branded Entertainment - Music | Google: Black-owned Friday | Silver | |
| Clio Awards | 2022 | Digital/Mobile - E-Commerce | Google: Black-owned Friday | Bronze | |
| Clio Awards | 2022 | Digital/Mobile - Microsite | Google: Black-owned Friday | Bronze | |
| Clio Awards | 2022 | Film - 61sec-5min | Google: Black-owned Friday | Shortlisted | |
| Clio Awards | 2022 | Film Craft - Copywriting | Google: Black-owned Friday | Shortlisted | |
| Clio Music Awards | 2022 | Use of Music in Audio | Google: Black-owned Friday | Silver | |
| Clio Music Awards | 2022 | Use of Music in Film/Video - 61 Seconds to Five Minutes | Google: Black-owned Friday | Bronze | |
| Clio Music Awards | 2022 | Use of Music in Film/Video - 61 Seconds to Five Minutes | Normani x Google -Black Owned Friday 2.0: "Wake Up Everybody" | Bronze | |
| D&AD Awards | 2022 | Casting - Film | Google: Black-owned Friday (Note: The award was presented to Google, and was shared with Normani, who is credited as an artist.) | Wood Pencil | |
| D&AD Awards | 2022 | E-Commerce - Entertainment | Google: Black-owned Friday | Wood Pencil | |
| D&AD Awards | 2022 | Digital - Promotional Websites | Google: Black-owned Friday | Wood Pencil | |
| D&AD Awards | 2022 | Impact - initiative | Google: Black-owned Friday | Shortlisted | |
| D&AD Awards | 2022 | E-Commerce - Entertainment | Google: Black-owned Friday | Shortlisted | |
| D&AD Awards | 2022 | Direct - Film | Google: Black-owned Friday | Shortlisted | |
| D&AD Awards | 2022 | Integrated - Content Led Campaigns | Google: Black-owned Friday | Shortlisted | |
| Dance Magazine Awards | 2019 | Best Music Video | "Motivation" | Nominated | |
| Global Awards | 2020 | Best Song of 2019 | "Dancing with a Stranger" | Nominated | |
| iHeartRadio Music Awards | 2019 | Best Solo Breakout | Normani | Nominated | |
| iHeartRadio Music Awards | 2020 | Best Collaboration | "Dancing with a Stranger" | Nominated | |
| iHeartRadio Music Awards | 2020 | Best music video | "Dancing with a Stranger" | Nominated | |
| iHeartRadio Music Awards | 2020 | Favorite music video choreography | "Motivation" | Nominated | |
| IHeartRadio Titanium Awards | 2019 | 1 Billion Total Audience Spins on iHeartRadio Stations | "Love Lies" | Won | |
| IHeartRadio Titanium Awards | 2020 | 1 Billion Total Audience Spins on iHeartRadio Stations | "Dancing with a Stranger" | Won | |
| Ivor Novello Awards | 2020 | PRS for Music Most Performed Work | "Dancing with a Stranger" | Nominated | |
| MTV Europe Music Awards | 2021 | Best Video | "Wild Side" | Nominated | |
| MTV Video Music Award | 2019 | Best R&B | "Waves" | Won | |
| MTV Video Music Award | 2020 | Best Choreography | "Motivation" | Nominated | |
| MTV Video Music Award | 2021 | Song of Summer | "Wild Side" | Nominated | |
| MTV Video Music Award | 2022 | Best Cinematography | "Wild Side" | Nominated | |
| MTV Video Music Award | 2022 | Best R&B | "Wild Side" | Nominated | |
| MTV Video Music Award | 2022 | Best Choreography | "Wild Side" | Nominated | |
| MTV Video Play Awards | 2019 | Winning videos | "Dancing with a Stranger” | Won | |
| NAACP Image Awards | 2020 | Outstanding song | "Motivation" | Nominated | |
| NME Awards | 2020 | Best Music Video | "Motivation" | Nominated | |
| People's Choice Awards | 2019 | Music Video of 2019 | "Dancing with a Stranger" | Nominated | |
| People's Choice Awards | 2019 | Song of 2019 | "Dancing with a Stranger" | Nominated | |
| Queerty Awards | 2020 | Anthem | "Dancing With A Stranger" | Nominated | |
| Shorty Awards | 2019 | Best in Music in Social Media | Normani | Nominated | |
| Soul Train Music Awards | 2018 | Best New Artist | Normani | Nominated | |
| Soul Train Music Awards | 2019 | Best Dance Performance | "Motivation" | Nominated | |
| Soul Train Music Awards | 2021 | Best Dance Performance | "Wild Side" | Won | |
| Soul Train Music Awards | 2021 | Video of the Year | "Wild Side" | Nominated | |
| Teen Choice Awards | 2018 | Choice R&B/Hip-Hop Song | "Love Lies" | Won | |
| Teen Choice Awards | 2019 | Choice R&B/Hip-Hop Artist | Normani | Nominated | |
| Teen Choice Awards | 2019 | Choice Pop Song | "Dancing with a Stranger" | Nominated | |
| Teen Choice Awards | 2019 | Choice Collaboration Song | "Dancing with a Stranger" | Nominated | |
| The Cybersmile Foundation | 2016 | September's Cybersmiler of the Month Award - Social Impact | Herself | Won | |
| The Cybersmile Foundation | 2017 | July's Cybersmiler of the Month Award | Herself | Won | |
| The One Show Awards | 2022 | Integrated - Integrated Branding Campaign | Google: Black-owned Friday (Note: The award was presented to Google, and was shared with Normani, who is credited as an artist.) | Gold | |
| The One Show Awards | 2022 | Branded Entertainment - Art Direction | Google: Black-owned Friday | Silver | |
| The One Show Awards | 2022 | Interactive - Online-only Video | Google: Black-owned Friday | Silver | |
| The One Show Awards | 2022 | Interactive - E-commerce | Google: Black-owned Friday | Silver | |
| The One Show Awards | 2022 | Branded Entertainment - Music Videos | Google: Black-owned Friday | Bronze | |
| The One Show Awards | 2022 | Interactive - Interactive Video | Google: Black-owned Friday | Bronze | |
| The One Show Awards | 2022 | Music & Sound Craft - Brand Collaboration | Google: Black-owned Friday | Bronze | |
| The One Show Awards | 2022 | Design - Moving Image | Google: Black-owned Friday | Bronze | |
| The One Show Awards | 2022 | Film - Online Film/Long Form | Google: Black-owned Friday | merit | |
| The One Show Awards | 2022 | Branded Entertainment - Long Form Video | Google: Black-owned Friday | merit | |
| The One Show Awards | 2022 | Fusion Pencil | Google: Black-owned Friday | Won | |
| The One Show Awards | 2022 | Best in Discipline - Integrated | Google: Black-owned Friday | Won | |
| UK Music Video Awards | 2021 | Best R&B/Soul Video – International | "Wild Side" | Won | |
| Variety & Golden Globe's Breakthrough Artist Awards | 2024 | Breakthrough Award | Freaky Tales | Honoree | |
| Variety's Hitmakers Awards | 2021 | Herself | Collaborator of the Year | Won | |
| W Magazine Award | 2019 | Song of the Summer That Was Released Too Late | "Motivation" | Won | |
| Webby Awards | 2022 | Diversity & Inclusion, Advertising, Media & PR | Google: Black-owned Friday (Note: The award was presented to Google, and was shared with Normani, who is credited as an artist.) | Won | |
| Webby Awards | 2022 | Best Copywriting, Advertising, Media & PR | Google: Black-owned Friday | Nominated | |
| Webby Awards | 2022 | Diversity & Inclusion (Branded) Video | Google: Black-owned Friday | Nominated | |

== Other accolades ==
=== Listicles ===
Name of publisher, name of listicle, year(s) listed, and placement result
| Publisher | Listicle | Year(s) | Result | Ref. |
|---|---|---|---|---|
| BET | Future 40 | 2020 | Placed | |
| Forbes | 30 Under 30 | 2020 | Placed | |
| Spotify | Breakout Artist of the Year | 2018 | 2nd | |
| The Guardian | The 25 Greatest Female Pop-Group Performers of All Time | 2019 | 18th | |
| Variety | Power of Young Hollywood List | 2020 | Placed | |
| Variety | Variety's Hitmakers: Collaborator of the Year | 2021 | Placed | |
