= Starrah =

American songwriter (born 1990)

- Also known as: Starrah
- Born: Brittany Talia Hazzard; June 14, 1990 (age 36)
- Origin: Delaware, U.S.
- Genres: R&B; pop rap; pop
- Occupations: Songwriter; singer; rapper
- Years active: 2014–present
- Label: Mad Decent

Brittany Talia Hazzard (born June 14, 1990), known professionally as Starrah, is an American songwriter, singer, and rapper from Delaware. Best known for her songwriting work for other music industry artists, Starrah has co-written three singles that peaked atop the Billboard Hot 100: "Havana" for Camila Cabello (featuring Young Thug) in 2017, "Girls Like You" for Maroon 5 the following year, and "Savage Remix" for Megan Thee Stallion (featuring Beyoncé) in 2020; the latter won a Grammy Award for Best Rap Song. In addition, she has co-written songs that have peaked within the chart's top 20: Rihanna's "Needed Me," Normani's "Wild Side" (featuring Cardi B), Halsey's "Now or Never," Kevin Gates' "2 Phones," Nicki Minaj, Drake and Lil Wayne's "No Frauds," and Drake's "Fake Love."

Her album credits include Travis Scott's Birds in the Trap Sing McKnight (2016), Calvin Harris's Funk Wav Bounces Vol. 1 (2017)—including the top 20 single "Feels" featuring Pharrell Williams, Katy Perry, and Big Sean—Nicki Minaj's Queen (2018), and Madonna's Madame X (2019).

As a recording artist, Starrah signed with Diplo's Mad Decent record label to release an eponymous collaborative project with the producer (titled Starrah x Diplo) in 2017. Her 2020 single, "How It Goes", preceded the release of her debut studio album, The Longest Interlude (2021).

== Early life and career ==
Starrah grew up in Delaware as the youngest of nine siblings. She has stated that she "grew up in the ghetto" and has written lyrics about police raids she experienced as a child. Her songwriting grew from writing short stories and poems. She attended Delaware State University and moved to Los Angeles after graduation to pursue a music career. After a period of uploading music to SoundCloud and selling samples through Instagram, a manager in the industry reached out to her. He connected her to more songwriters which led to Starrah writing "Be Real" by Kid Ink in 2015, which reached No. 43 on the Billboard Hot 100.

In 2016, Starrah wrote several songs that became top 40 hits. "2 Phones" by Kevin Gates reached double platinum status. Rihanna's single "Needed Me" reached number seven on the Billboard Hot 100 and spent 42 weeks on the chart.

On September 22, 2017, Starrah released a joint EP with producer Diplo titled Starrah x Diplo.

In April 2019, Starrah formed a partnership with Hipgnosis Songs Fund. She worked closely with Madonna for her 2019 album Madame X, writing on six tracks.

Starrah released her debut single "How It Goes" on August 12, 2020.

== Artistry ==
Starrah stated that she writes lyrics first, and then finds a melody and production to fit them. In her early career, she was sometimes turned away from studio sessions for being "too urban", but later found success with urban crossover into mainstream pop music.

== Personal life ==
Due to a mixture of social anxiety and wishes for privacy, Starrah avoids being photographed and recognized in public. Starrah is queer.

== Discography ==
=== Studio albums ===
- 2021: The Longest Interlude

=== EP ===
- Starrah x Diplo (with Diplo) (2017)

=== Singles ===
==== As lead artist ====
- 2014
  - Starrah – "Low" (produced by Noah "40" Shebib)
- 2016
  - Starrah – "Rush / Rush (Remix)" featuring Kehlani
  - Starrah – "Dirty Diana"
- 2017
  - Starrah and Diplo – "Imperfections"
  - Starrah and Diplo – "Swerve"
  - Starrah and Diplo – "Always Come Back"
  - Starrah and Diplo – "You Know It"
  - Starrah and Diplo – "Zoo"
- 2018
  - Starrah – "Codeine Cowgirl" (produced by Aleksei)
- 2020
  - Starrah – "How It Goes" (produced by June Nawakii)
  - Starrah – "Keep Calm"
- 2021
  - Starrah - "Miss This"
  - Skrillex, Starrah and Four Tet – "Butterflies"
  - Starrah - "56 Nights"
  - Starrah - "8 Days A Week"
  - Starrah - "Distance And Time"
  - Starrah - "Forever"
  - Starrah - "Home Alone"
  - Starrah - "Interlude"
  - Starrah - "Love Mania"
  - Starrah - "Made For You"
  - Starrah - "Make Time"
  - Starrah - "Thought Wrong"
  - Starrah - "Who Decides War (More Than Words)"
- 2023
  - Starrah & Skrillex - "Good Space"

==== As featured artist / guest appearances ====
- 2015
  - Kid Ink featuring Starrah – "Blowin' Swishers Part. 2"
  - Jeremih featuring Starrah – "Pass Dat"
  - The Weeknd featuring Starrah and Jeremih – "Pass Dat (Remix)"
- 2016
  - Belly featuring Starrah – "It's All Love"
  - Travis Scott with Young Thug featuring Quavo – "Pick Up the Phone" (Additional vocals)
  - Cashmere Cat featuring Starrah, 2 Chainz, and Tory Lanez – "Throw Myself a Party"
  - The Weeknd – "True Colors" (Additional vocals)
  - Bricc Baby featuring Starrah, Fetty Wap, and Young Thug – "Remix'n A Bricc"
  - Lil Debbie featuring Starrah – "Whoop"
  - Destructo & Wax Motif featuring Starrah and Pusha T – "Catching Plays"
  - G-Eazy featuring Starrah, Lil Wayne & Yo Gotti – "Order More"
- 2017
  - Charli XCX featuring Starrah and Raye – "Dreamer"
  - Big Sean featuring Eminem – "No Favors" (Additional vocals)
  - Big Sean – "Jump Out the Window" (Additional vocals)
  - Big Sean featuring Starrah and Flint Chozen Choir – "Bigger Than Me"
  - Calvin Harris featuring Young Thug, Pharrell Williams and Ariana Grande – "Heatstroke" (Additional background vocals)
  - Halsey – "Now or Never" (Additional vocals)
  - Kid Ink featuring Starrah – "No Strings"
  - Major Lazer featuring Quavo, Travis Scott and Camila Cabello – "Know No Better" (Background vocals)
  - Camila Cabello featuring Young Thug – "Havana" (Additional vocals)
- 2020
  - Vory featuring Starrah – "All Due Respect"
- 2025
  - Diplo featuring Starrah & Project Pat – "Still Get Like That"
  - Skrillex featuring Starrah, Zacari & Ilykimchi – "MOMENTUM"

== Songwriting credits ==
Song	Year	Artist(s)	Album
"Be Real"	2015	Kid Ink featuring Dej Loaf	Full Speed
"2 Phones"	2015	Kevin Gates	Islah
"Drank"	2015	Jeremih	Late Nights: The Album
"The Intro About Nothing"	2015	Wale & USHER	The Album About Nothing
"Order More"	2015	G-Eazy, Starrah	When It's Dark Out
"Pass Dat"	2015	Jeremih	Late Nights: The Album
"Switch Up"	2015	R. Kelly, Lil Wayne, Jeremih	The Buffet (Deluxe Version)
"Good Idea"	2015	Kid Ink, BIA	Summer In The Winter
"Blowin' Swishers Pt. 2	2015	Kid Ink, Starrah	Summer In The Winter
"Needed Me"	2016	Rihanna	Anti
"It's All Love"	2016	Belly, Starrah	Another Day In Paradise
"Body"	2016	Dreezy featuring Jeremih	No Hard Feelings
"The Half"	2016	DJ Snake featuring Jeremih, Young Thug and Swizz Beatz	Encore
"Burn Brighter"	2016	Pavlova	Non-album single
"Lay Up"	2016	Ella Mai	CHANGE
"Throw Myself A Party"	2016	Cashmere Cat, Starrah, 2 Chainz, Tory Lanez	Non-album single
"Pick Up the Phone"	2016	Travis Scott with Young Thug featuring Quavo	Birds in the Trap Sing McKnight
"Way Back"	2016	Travis Scott	Birds in the Trap Sing McKnight
"Lose"	2016	Travis Scott	Birds in the Trap Sing McKnight
"Trust Nobody"	2016	Cashmere Cat featuring Selena Gomez and Tory Lanez	9
"Fake Love"	2016	Drake	More Life
"True Colors"	2016	The Weeknd	Starboy
"ON"	2017	Daniel Skye	Non-album single
"I Wanna Be"	2017	Kehlani	SweetSexySavage (Deluxe)
"No Favors"	2017	Big Sean featuring Eminem	I Decided
"Jump Out the Window"	2017	Big Sean	I Decided
"Bigger Than Me"	2017	Big Sean featuring Starrah and Flint Chozen Choir	I Decided
"Regret in Your Tears"	2017	Nicki Minaj	Non-album single
"Dreamer"	2017	Charli xcx, Starrah, RAYE	Number 1 Angel
"No Frauds"	2017	Nicki Minaj featuring Drake and Lil Wayne	Non-album single
"Ice Melts"	2017	Drake featuring Young Thug	More Life
"No Strings"	2017	Kid Ink, Starrah	7 Series
"Heatstroke"	2017	Calvin Harris featuring Young Thug, Pharrell Williams and Ariana Grande	Funk Wav Bounces Vol. 1
"Feels"	2017	Calvin Harris featuring Pharrell Williams, Katy Perry and Big Sean	Funk Wav Bounces Vol. 1
"Skrt on Me"	2017	Calvin Harris featuring Nicki Minaj	Funk Wav Bounces Vol. 1
"Prayers Up"	2017	Calvin Harris featuring Travis Scott and A-Trak	Funk Wav Bounces Vol. 1
"Cash Out"	2017	Calvin Harris featuring Schoolboy Q, PartyNextDoor and DRAM	Funk Wav Bounces Vol. 1
"Now or Never"	2017	Halsey	Hopeless Fountain Kingdom
"Infinite Stripes"	2017	Cashmere Cat featuring Ty Dolla Sign	9
"Swish Swish"	2017	Katy Perry featuring Nicki Minaj	Witness
"Know No Better"	2017	Major Lazer featuring Quavo, Travis Scott and Camila Cabello	Know No Better
"Don't Quit"	2017	DJ Khaled and Calvin Harris featuring Travis Scott and Jeremih	Grateful
"Havana"	2017	Camila Cabello featuring Young Thug	Camila
"Inside Out"	2017	Camila Cabello	Camila
"What Lovers Do"	2017	Maroon 5 featuring Sza	Red Pill Blues
"Girls Like You"	2017	Maroon 5	Red Pill Blues
"No I Love Yous"	2017	Era Istrefi featuring French Montana	Non-album single
"Wheels"	2017	Moxie Raia	Non-album single
"I Sip"	2017	Tory Lanez	Non-album single
"Boom Boom"	2017	Iggy Azalea, Zedd	Pitch Perfect 3 (Original Motion Picture Soundtrack)
"Had To"	2017	Kevin Gates	By Any Means 2
"Wasted Times"	2018	The Weeknd	My Dear Melancholy
"Hard White"	2018	Nicki Minaj	Queen
"Run & Hide"	2018	Nicki Minaj	Queen
"Nip Tuck"	2018	Nicki Minaj	Queen
"2 Lit 2 Late Interlude"	2018	Nicki Minaj	Queen
"Come See About Me"	2018	Nicki Minaj	Queen
"Thought I Knew You"	2018	Nicki Minaj featuring The Weeknd	Queen
"Checklist"	2018	Normani and Calvin Harris featuring WizKid	Normani x Calvin Harris
"In God I Trust"	2018	Kevin Gates	Luca Brasi 3
"CHAMPAGNE ROSÉ"	2018	Quavo, Madonna, Cardi B	QUAVO HUNCHO
"OMG"	2018	RL Grime, Joji, Chief Keef	NOVA
"Future" (feat. Quavo)	2019	Madonna	Madame X
"Crave" (feat. Swae Lee)	2019	Madonna	Madame X
"Crazy"	2019	Madonna	Madame X
"Come Alive"	2019	Madonna	Madame X
"Looking for Mercy"	2019	Madonna	Madame X
"I Rise"	2019	Madonna	Madame X
"Back That Up To The Beat - Demo Version"	2019	Madonna	Non-album single
"Rush"	2019	Julian Kenzo	Non-album single
"Find Your Way Back"	2019	Beyoncé	The Lion King: The Gift
"Already"	2019	Beyoncé featuring Shatta Wale and Major Lazer	The Lion King: The Gift
"Hate Me"	2019	Ellie Goulding featuring Juice Wrld	Brightest Blue
"Back For You"	2019	Cashmere Cat	Princess Catgirl
"Payback"	2019	Maeta	Do Not Disturb
"Penthouse in Miami"	2019	Tyga, Starrah	Legendary (Deluxe Edition)
"Smile"	2020	Katy Perry	Smile
"Savage Remix"	2020	Megan Thee Stallion featuring Beyoncé	Good News
"Tangerine"	2020	Glass Animals	Dreamland
"Are You Even Real"	2020	James Blake	Non-album single
"All Due Respect"	2020	Vory featuring Starrah	Vory
"Prices"	2020	Lil Uzi Vert featuring WanMor	Eternal Atake
"Wild Side"	2021	Normani featuring Cardi B	Dopamine
"Coming Back"	2021	James Blake featuring Sza	Friends That Break Your Heart
"Paradise"	2021	CL	Alpha
"Automatic Woman"	2021	H.E.R.	Bruised (Soundtrack from and Inspired by the Netflix Film)
"Remedy"	2021	Maroon 5 featuring Stevie Nicks	Jordi
"Usain Boo"	2022	Kodak Black	Back For Everything
"Feeling Like The End"	2022	Joji	Smithereens
"Self Love"	2023	Metro Boomin and Coi Leray	Metro Boomin Presents Spider-Man: Across The Spider-Verse (Soundtrack From And Inspired By The Motion Picture)
"Fall Back"	2023	James Blake	Playing Robots Into Heaven
"Truss Mii"	2023	brandUn DeShay	goldUn Child: 2 [Deluxe]
"Birds Calling"	2024	Kevin Gates	The Ceremony
"Ammunition"	2024	Zara Larsson	Venus
"1:59"	2024	Normani featuring Gunna	Dopamine
"Big Boy"	2024	Normani featuring Starrah	Dopamine
"Tantrums"	2024	Normani featuring James Blake	Dopamine
"Candy Paint"	2024	Normani	Dopamine
"Grip"	2024	Normani	Dopamine
"Little Secrets"	2024	Normani	Dopamine
"Diana"	2024	Tee Grizzley, Flo Milli	Post Traumatic
"SLOW IT DOWN"	2024	The Kid LAROI, Quavo	Non-album single
"If It's Okay"	2024	Nicki Minaj, David Guetta, Davido	The Pinkprint (Tenth Anniversary Edition)
"MOMENTUM"	2025	Skrillex, Starrah, Zacari, ilykimchi	F*CK U SKRILLEX YOU THINK UR ANDY WARHOL BUT UR NOT!! <3
"P.B.S."	2025	DESTIN CONRAD, Lil Nas X	LOVE ON DIGITAL
"GRRL'S GRRL"	2025	SAILORR	FROM FLORIDA'S FINEST
"Still Get Like That"	2025	Diplo, Starrah, Project Pat, d00mscrvll	d00mscrvll, Vol. 1
"Red Eye"	2026	Heidi Klum, Diplo	Non-album single
"Pieces"	2026	Dom Innarella	Non-album single
"Sad Girls"	2026	Bebe Rexha, David Guetta	DIRTY BLONDE
