= Candy Paint =

Candy Paint may refer to:

- Candy paint, a series of colors used in car customization originated by Joe Bailon
- "Candy Paint" (Normani song), 2024
- "Candy Paint" (Post Malone song), 2017
- "Candy Paint", a song by Bone Thugs-n-Harmony from the 2007 album Strength & Loyalty
- "Candy Paint", a 2024 song by Channel Tres and Thundercat
- Candy Paint, a 2005 film short directed by Andrew Waller
