= New to You =

2022 single by Calvin Harris, Normani, Tinashe, and Offset

Single by Calvin Harris, Normani, Tinashe, and Offset

from the album Funk Wav Bounces Vol. 2
- Released: 29 July 2022
- Genre: Disco; R&B
- Length: 5:02
- Label: Columbia
- Songwriters: Adam Wiles; Jessie Reyez; Kiari Kendrell Cephus; Normani Kordei Hamilton; Tinashe Kachingwe
- Producer: Calvin Harris

Calvin Harris singles chronology
| "Stay with Me" (2022) | "New to You" (2022) | "Miracle" (2023) |

Normani singles chronology
| "Fair" (2022) | "New to You" (2022) | "1:59" (2024) |

Tinashe singles chronology
| "HMU for a Good Time" (2022) | "New to You" (2022) | "Heaven" (2023) |

Offset singles chronology
| "Step 1" (2022) | "New to You" (2022) | "Big 14" (2022) |

"New to You" is a song by Scottish DJ and record producer Calvin Harris, American singers Normani and Tinashe and American rapper Offset. It was released on 29 July 2022 through Columbia Records as the fourth single from Harris' sixth studio album, Funk Wav Bounces Vol. 2. The song was written by the artists alongside Jessie Reyez.

== Background ==
"New to You" marks the second time Harris has teamed up with Tinashe, following their song "Dollar Signs" from his fourth studio album Motion (2014); he also previously teamed up with Normani on the 2018 extended play Normani x Calvin Harris, which contains the songs "Checklist" and "Slow Down"; and previously joined Offset on the Frank Ocean–assisted single "Slide" from his album Funk Wav Bounces Vol. 1 (2017).

== Composition ==
The song was composed by Harris, alongside Normani, Tinashe, Offset, and singer-songwriter Jessie Reyez.

Musically, "New to You" is a bubbly R&B-inspired post-disco song. Billboard referred to it as "classy orchestral arrangements with glittery disco vibes". The track has also been described as having "a swaying groove, punchy stings and synths leading the way over a slick bass line". It sees Normani singing about seducing a potential love interest with the lyrics "This might be news to you / This thing might feel new to you / But if you like everything / I think you might love me, baby" in the chorus; and Offset rapping about "the effervescent feeling of finding the right person" with lyrics like "I was dead on relationships / You made me feel like living."

== Credits and personnel ==
Credits adapted from Tidal.

- Calvin Harris – production, songwriting, recording, vocal production, mixing
- Normani – vocals, songwriting
- Tinashe – vocals, songwriting
- Offset – vocals, songwriting
- Jessie Reyez – songwriting
- Everton Nelson – violin
- Emil Chakalov – violin
- Hayley Pomfrett – violin
- Lucy Wilkins – violin
- Marianne Haynes – violin
- Charis Jenson – violin
- Tom Pigott-Smith – violin
- Patrick Kiernan – violin
- Ian Humphries – violin
- Perry Montague-Mason – violin
- Richard George – violin
- Warren Zielinski – violin
- Charlie Brown – violin
- John Mills – violin
- Bruce White – viola
- Andy Parker – viola
- Adrian Smith – viola
- Reiad Chibah – viola
- Sara Hajir – cello
- Nick Cooper – cello
- Ian Burdge – cello
- Chris Worsey – cello
- Dave Kutch – mastering
- Kuk Harrell – recording, vocal production, engineering assistance
- JRich ENT – recording
- Stephen Fitzmaurice – recording
- Jelli Dorman – engineering assistance
- Mark Goodchild – miscellaneous production
- Emma Marks – miscellaneous production
- Adele Phillips – miscellaneous production

== Charts ==
Chart performance for "New to You"
| Chart (2022) | Peak position |
|---|---|
| Japan Hot Overseas (Billboard Japan) | 19 |
| New Zealand Hot Singles (RMNZ) | 15 |
