= Potion (song) =

2022 single by Calvin Harris, Dua Lipa and Young Thug

Single by Calvin Harris, Dua Lipa and Young Thug

from the album Funk Wav Bounces Vol. 2
- Released: 27 May 2022
- Genre: Dance; disco; EDM; pop
- Length: 3:34
- Label: Sony
- Songwriters: Calvin Harris; Dua Lipa; Young Thug; Jessie Reyez; Maneesh Bidaye
- Producer: Calvin Harris

Calvin Harris singles chronology
"Lonely" (2022)	"Potion" (2022)	"New Money" (2022)

Dua Lipa singles chronology
"Sweetest Pie" (2022)	"Potion" (2022)	"Dance the Night" (2023)

Young Thug singles chronology
"Bubbly" (2021)	"Potion" (2022)	"Run" (2022)

Music video
- "Potion" on YouTube

"Potion" is a song by Scottish disc jockey Calvin Harris, English singer Dua Lipa and American rapper Young Thug from Harris's sixth studio album, Funk Wav Bounces Vol. 2 (2022). The song was written by Harris, Lipa, Young Thug, Jessie Reyez and Maneesh Bidaye, with the production completed by Harris. It was released as the lead single from the album for digital download and streaming in various countries by Sony on 27 May 2022. The song combines dance, disco, EDM, and pop music to create a laidback atmosphere, accompanied by 1970s-style instrumentation of bongos, electric guitars and pianos. Its lyrics center around the essence of a potion that promises a good summer experience.

"Potion" garnered a warm reception from music critics for its music, production and Lipa and Young Thug's vocal performances. The song reached number 16 on the UK Singles Chart and achieved a silver certification from the British Phonographic Industry (BPI) in the UK. It peaked at number 31 on the Canadian Hot 100 and number 71 the US Billboard Hot 100 as well as entering the top 50 in several countries, such as Australia, New Zealand and Ireland. The psychedelic music video premiered on Harris's YouTube channel on 27 May 2022. It was designed to combine a 1960s liquid light show with a contemporary setting and displays the journey of Lipa and Young Thug stranded in a tropical island in a purple ocean.

== Background and composition ==
In April 2022, Harris announced his forthcoming studio album Funk Wav Bounces Vol. 2 to be released mid-year, as a continuation of his fifth album, Funk Wav Bounces Vol. 1 (2017). Harris previewed the album's lead single "Potion" on the social media platform TikTok on 24 May. In the preview, he showcased the development of the instrumental and a FaceTime call with Lipa, who had agreed to contribute her vocals. The song was released for digital download and streaming in various countries by Sony on 27 May 2022 as the lead single from Harris's sixth studio album Funk Wav Bounces Vol. 2 (2022). Marking Harris and Lipa's second collaboration following the release of "One Kiss" (2018), he elaborated, "It's an honour to work with Dua and Thug again [...] They're both such dynamic artists who have contributed so much to today's musical landscape."

"Potion" was written by Harris (Adam Wiles), Lipa, Young Thug (Jeffery Williams), Jessie Reyez and Maneesh Bidaye, with the production completed by Harris. The song is composed in the key of B minor and time signature of common time with a tempo ranging from 76 to 100 beats per minute. It follows in the chord progression of Em^{9}-F♯m-Gmaj^{7}-Gmaj^{9}-Em^{7}-F♯m-G^{6}-Gmaj^{7}-F♯m in the intro and Bm^{7}-B^{7}-Gmaj^{7}-Em-F♯m^{7}-Bm^{7} throughout. The vocal range in the song spans from a low note of A_{4} to a high note of G_{5}. "Potion" is a laidback dance, disco, EDM and pop song. The instrumental has a 1970s-inspired tone, which includes bongo, electric guitar and piano sounds. The song is anchored by a "steamy hook from Lipa, a nimble verse from Thug, a snaking bassline", disco and retro beats, rhodes riff, "seductive" chorus, and synth-heavy groove. The lyrics of the song encapsulate the essence of a potion that promises a good summer experience. In the chorus, Lipa sings about, "Late night conversations, electric emotions/ Sprinkled with a little bit of sex and it's a potion [...] Late night bodies aching, mental stimulation/ Sprinkled with a little bit of sex appeal and it's a moment."

== Critical reception ==
Upon its release, "Potion" generally garnered a positive reception from music critics. Paolo Ragusa from Consequence highlighted Lipa and Young Thug's vocals as well as Harris's production in the song as a demonstration of his competence to "work with any kind of artist to accomplish his vision". Dylan Green for Pitchfork also complimented Harris's "well-engineered" production, which he described as "sturdy enough to house a steamy Lipa hook and a nimble verse from Thug". Samantha Reis of We Rave You labeled the song as a "hot and sensual" song, showcasing Harris' ability to effortlessly create his "especially ones that manage to perform equally bombastically on radio and on the dancefloor". Rachel Narozniak from Dancing Astronaut commended Lipa's "inimitable mezzo-soprano" and Young Thug's "flair" also feeling the song to be a "seamless continuation of the Funk Wav [Bounces Vol. 1] sound". Chris Deville for Stereogum commented that the song "taps right back into the first volume's fun beachside vibe". Isabel von Glahn of Westdeutscher Rundfunk (WDR) noted the song's "electrifying vibes", with Lipa and Young Thug complementing the sound perfectly, making it an "ideal summer pop track".

Starr Bowenbank from Billboard described the song as "sultry", with Lipa exuding a simmering sensuality, predicting it to be a "sweltering, soon-to-be hit that's primed for dominating party playlists". Katie Bein from the same publication characterised the song as a "summer jam", commenting that it fuses "Santana vibes with a lounge mood". Alex Gonzalez of Uproxx labeled the song as "funky", aligning with the "disco and synth-pop sounds of Lipa's Future Nostalgia" that is "edgy enough to serve as a bridge to her next". In reviewing the album Funk Wav Bounces Vol.2, Ryan Bulbeck from Renowned for Sound found "Potion" to "effectively encapsulate the record's direction". Izzy Sigston for The Line of Best Fit regarded the song to be "the perfect potion for a unwinding on a sticky summer evening". Maura Johnston of Rolling Stone believed Lipa and Young Thug to "dissemble the art of seduction" on the song. While Hannah Mylrea from NME described it as a "sultry, carefree jam", Arwa Haider for Financial Times labeled the song as "tuneful" and "intoxicating". However, Ben Devlin of MusicOMH rendered the song as "nice" but opined that it "seems to lack impact". Owen Myers from Pitchfork viewed the song as Lipa's "weakest [...] underwhelming post-Future Nostalgia singles".

== Commercial performance ==
In the United Kingdom, "Potion" reached number 16 on the UK Singles Chart in the issue dated 3 June 2022, remaining on the ranking for 12 consecutive weeks. In September 2022, the song received a silver certification from the British Phonographic Industry (BPI) for shifting more than 200,000 units in the UK. In Australia, it peaked at number 32 on the ARIA Singles Chart and at number 35 on the New Zealand Singles Chart in New Zealand. In Canada, "Potion" reached number 31 on the Canadian Hot 100 and entered the top 50 on the CHR/Top 40 and Hot AC rankings, respectively. In the United States, the song debuted and peaked at number 71 the US Billboard Hot 100 in the issue dated 11 June 2022. It also reached the top 40 on the Adult Top 40 and Mainstream Top 40 charts, respectively. Reaching the top 10 in Croatia and Ireland, "Potion" reached the top 50 in the Czech Republic, Denmark, Greece, Hungary, Iceland, Lithuania, the Netherlands, Norway, Slovakia, Sweden and Switzerland. Furthermore, the song peaked at number 30 on the Billboard Global 200 ranking, having spent a total of nine weeks on the chart.

== Music video ==
Scene from the music video of "Potion", showcasing Dua Lipa and Calvin Harris in the last sequence

An official music video for "Potion" premiered to Harris' official YouTube channel on 27 May 2022. The video was directed by Emil Nava, with whom Harris has established a longstanding partnership. Kris Smale of The Mill was enlisted to color-grade the video, with the aspiration to incorporate a "1960s liquid light show into a digital and contemporary setting". At the opening of the psychedelic video, a camera is panning towards a tropical island in an ocean, gradually transitioning from a purple sunset ambiente to a darker twilight setting. Following that, Lipa is showcased singing the song from an overturned vintage car situated against a backdrop displaying a brightly illuminated sunset. Then, the singer and a troupe of dancers are seen dancing and walking down a hallway lit with neon lights. The appearance of Young Thug follows after that, where he can be seen performing alongside a band of four women in a setting adorned with shades of pink and red. As the video closes, a shot of Lipa leaning her head against Harris's shoulder can be seen. Reis from We Rave You commented that the video replicates the concept of the song and the "Funk Wav Bounces Project itself". Tomás Mier for Rolling Stone highlighted Lipa's appearance as "magically sexy" in the video.

== Charts ==
=== Weekly charts ===
Weekly chart performance
Chart (2022–2025)	Peak position
Australia (ARIA)	32
Austria (Ö3 Austria Top 40)	59
Belgium (Ultratop 50 Wallonia)	28
Canada Hot 100 (Billboard)	31
Canada CHR/Top 40 (Billboard)	35
Canada Hot AC (Billboard)	45
Croatia (HRT)	3
Czech Republic Airplay (ČNS IFPI)	22
Denmark (Tracklisten)	39
France (SNEP)	99
Germany (GfK)	85
Global 200 (Billboard)	30
Greece (IFPI)	15
Hungary (Dance Top 40)	19
Hungary (Rádiós Top 40)	36
Iceland (Tónlistinn)	34
Ireland (IRMA)	9
Italy (FIMI)	90
Lithuania (AGATA)	15
Netherlands (Dutch Top 40)	31
Netherlands (Single Top 100)	45
New Zealand (Recorded Music NZ)	35
Norway (VG-lista)	28
Portugal (AFP)	62
San Marino Airplay (SMRRTV Top 50)	26
Slovakia Airplay (ČNS IFPI)	32
Sweden (Sverigetopplistan)	40
Switzerland (Schweizer Hitparade)	31
UK Singles (Official Charts)	16
US Billboard Hot 100	71
US Adult Pop Airplay (Billboard)	31
US Pop Airplay (Billboard)	23
Venezuela Airplay (Record Report)	90

=== Year-end charts ===
2022 year-end chart performance for "Potion"
Chart (2022)	Position
Belgium (Ultratop 50 Wallonia)	162
Croatia (HRT)	64
Hungary (Dance Top 100)	86

2023 year-end chart performance for "Potion"
Chart (2023)	Position
Hungary (Dance Top 40)	45

2024 year-end chart performance for "Potion"
Chart (2024)	Position
Hungary (Dance Top 40)	94

2025 year-end chart performance for "Potion"
Chart (2025)	Position
Hungary (Dance Top 40)	78

== Certifications ==
Certifications
Region	Certification	Certified units/sales
Australia (ARIA)	Gold	35,000^{‡}
Canada (Music Canada)	Gold	40,000^{‡}
France (SNEP)	Gold	100,000^{‡}
Mexico (AMPROFON)	Gold	70,000^{‡}
New Zealand (RMNZ)	Gold	15,000^{‡}
United Kingdom (BPI)	Silver	200,000^{‡}
United States (RIAA)	Gold	500,000^{‡}
^{‡} Sales+streaming figures based on certification alone.

== Release history ==
Release dates and formats
Region	Date	Format(s)	Label	Ref.
Various	27 May 2022	Digital download; streaming	Sony	
France	27 May 2022	Radio airplay	Sony	
Italy	27 May 2022	Radio airplay	Sony	
United Kingdom	27 May 2022	Various	Sony	
United States	6 June 2022	Adult contemporary radio	Columbia	
United States	7 June 2022	Contemporary hit radio	Columbia	
