= List of people on the United States cover of Rolling Stone (2020s) =

This is a list of people (real or fictional) appearing on the cover of Rolling Stone magazine in the 2020s. This list is for the regular monthly issues of the magazine, including variant covers, and does not include special issues.

== 2020 ==
Issue number	Cover date	People on cover	Notes
1335	January 2020	Elizabeth Warren	
1336	February 2020	Lizzo	Lizzo appears with two male models
1337	March 2020	Megan Thee Stallion, Normani, SZA	"Women Shaping the Future: The Takeover" cover story
1338	April 2020	Greta Thunberg	
1339	May 2020	Andrew Cuomo	
1340	June 2020	Bad Bunny	
1341	July 2020	Black Lives Matter protestors	
1342	August 2020	Lil Baby	
1343	September 2020	The Beatles (George Harrison, John Lennon, Paul McCartney, Ringo Starr)	
1344	October 2020	Bruce Springsteen	
1345	November 2020	Joe Biden	
1346	December 2020	Paul McCartney, Taylor Swift	"Musicians on Musicians" cover story

== 2021 ==
Issue number	Cover date	People on cover	Notes
1347	January 2021	Miley Cyrus	
1348	February 2021	Dua Lipa	
1349	March 2021	Kacey Musgraves	
1350	April 2021	John David Washington	
1351	May 2021	Issa Rae	
1352	June 2021	BTS (J-Hope, Jimin, Jin, Jungkook, RM, Suga, V)	
1353/1354	July–August 2021	Billie Eilish	The Hot List 2021
1355	September 2021	Silk Sonic (Bruno Mars, Anderson .Paak)	
1356	October 2021	Dave Grohl	
1357	November 2021	David Byrne, Lorde	"Musicians on Musicians" cover story
1357	November 2021	Kehlani, Alicia Keys	"Musicians on Musicians" cover story
1357	November 2021	Madonna, Maluma	"Musicians on Musicians" cover story
1357	November 2021	Alanis Morissette, Olivia Rodrigo	"Musicians on Musicians" cover story
1358	December 2021	Adele	

== 2022 ==
Issue number	Cover date	People on cover	Notes
1359	January 2022	Doja Cat	
1360	February 2022	Rauw Alejandro	
1361	March 2022	Jennifer Lopez	
1362	April 2022	Jack Harlow	
1363	May 2022	MrBeast	
1364	June 2022	Blackpink (Jisoo, Jennie, Rosé, Lisa)	
1365/1366	July–August 2022	Megan Thee Stallion	The Hot List 2022
1367	September 2022	Harry Styles	
1368	October 2022	Stephen Curry	
1369	November 2022	RM, Pharrell Williams	"Musicians on Musicians" cover story
1370	December 2022	Selena Gomez	

== 2023 ==
Issue number	Cover date	People on cover	Notes
1371	January 2023	Rosalía	
1372	February 2023	Boygenius (Julien Baker, Phoebe Bridgers, Lucy Dacus)	
1373	March 2023	Michael B. Jordan	
1374	April 2023	Ed Sheeran	
1375	May 2023	Emma Chamberlain	The Creators Issue
1376	June 2023	Janelle Monáe	
1377/1378	July–August 2023	Bad Bunny	
1379	September 2023	Karol G	
1380	October 2023	Olivia Rodrigo	
1381	November 2023	Snoop Dogg, Latto	"Musicians on Musicians" cover story
1382	December 2023	DJ Khaled	

== 2024 ==
Issue number	Cover date	People on cover	Notes
1383	January 2024	21 Savage	
1384	February 2024	Dua Lipa	
1385	March 2024	Kristen Stewart	
1386	April 2024	Peso Pluma	"Future of Music" cover story
1387	May 2024	Billie Eilish	
1388	June 2024	Cardi B	
1389/1390	July–August 2024	Shakira	
1391	September 2024	Ice Spice	
1392	October 2024	Chappell Roan	
1393	November 2024	Bruce Springsteen, Zach Bryan	"Musicians on Musicians" cover story
1394	December 2024	Timothée Chalamet	

== 2025 ==
Issue number	Cover date	People on cover	Notes
1395	January 2025	Coldplay (Chris Martin)	
1396	February 2025	Addison Rae	
1397	March 2025	Liam Payne	
1398	April 2025	Benson Boone	"Future of Music" cover story
1398	April 2025	Megan Moroney	"Future of Music" cover story
1398	April 2025	Iván Cornejo	"Future of Music" cover story
1398	April 2025	Rema	"Future of Music" cover story
1399	May 2025	Lil Wayne	
1400	June 2025	Lorde	
1401/1402	July–August 2025	Sabrina Carpenter	
1403	September 2025	Steve Lacy	
1404	October 2025	Paul Mescal	
1405	November 2025	Jack Antonoff, Hayley Williams	"Musicians on Musicians" cover story
1406	December 2025	Lady Gaga	"Voices of the Year" cover story

== 2026 ==
Issue number	Cover date	People on cover	Notes
1407	January 2026	Tate McRae	
1408	February 2026	Travis Scott	
1409	March 2026	Grateful Dead	
1409	March 2026	Bob Weir	
1410	April 2026	Lola Young	"Future of Music" cover story
1410	April 2026	BigXthaPlug	"Future of Music" cover story
1410	April 2026	Fuerza Regida	"Future of Music" cover story
1411	May 2026	BTS	
1412	June 2026	Noah Kahan	
1413/1414	July–August 2026	Charli XCX	
1415	September 2026	Gracie Abrams	
1416	October 2026	Geese	"Long Live Rock!" cover story
1417	November 2026	Harry Styles, Thom Yorke	"Musicians on Musicians" cover story
