= 1:59 =

Single by Normani featuring Gunna

from the album Dopamine
- Released: April 26, 2024
- Genre: R&B
- Length: 3:12
- Label: RCA
- Composers: Tommy Brown; Marqueze Parker; Kenyon "KC" Moore
- Lyricists: Normani Hamilton; Brittany Hazzard; Sergio Kitchens
- Producers: Tommy Brown; Leather Jackett

Normani singles chronology
"New to You" (2022)	"1:59" (2024)	"Candy Paint" (2024)

Gunna singles chronology
"Prada Dem" (2024)	"1:59" (2024)	"WhatsApp (Wassam)" (2024)

"1:59" is a song by American singer Normani featuring American rapper Gunna. It was released on April 26, 2024, by RCA Records as the lead single from her debut solo album, Dopamine (2024).

== Background ==
On March 23, 2024, Normani announced on X (formerly Twitter) that her single "1:59", featuring American rapper Gunna, would serve as the second single from her debut solo album Dopamine (2024). The singer also shared a snippet of the track on Instagram. The song was later released on April 26, 2024.

== Credits and personnel ==
Credits adapted from Genius.

- Normani – vocals, songwriting
- Gunna – vocals, songwriting
- Tommy Brown – songwriting, production
- Leather Jackettt – songwriting, production
- Ohad Nissim – engineering
- Jaycen Joshua – mixing, mastering
- Mike Seaberg – mixing, mastering
- Jacob Richards – mixing assistance
- Chris Bhikoo – mixing assistance

== Charts ==
Chart performance for "1:59"
Chart (2024)	Peak position
New Zealand Hot Singles (RMNZ)	15
US Hot R&B Songs (Billboard)	16

== Release history ==
Release history and formats for "1:59"
Country	Date	Format	Label	Ref.
Various	April 26, 2024	Digital download; streaming	RCA	
United States	May 13, 2024	Urban contemporary radio	RCA	
