= Funk Wav Bounces Vol. 2 =

2022 studio album by Calvin Harris

Studio album by Calvin Harris
- Released: 5 August 2022
- Genre: Disco-pop; EDM-pop
- Length: 43:51
- Label: Columbia
- Producer: Calvin Harris; Burns

Calvin Harris chronology
Normani x Calvin Harris (2018)	Funk Wav Bounces Vol. 2 (2022)	96 Months (2024)

Singles from Funk Wav Bounces Vol. 2
- 1. "Potion" Released: 27 May 2022; 2. "New Money" Released: 1 July 2022; 3. "Stay with Me" Released: 15 July 2022; 4. "New to You" Released: 29 July 2022

Funk Wav Bounces Vol. 2 is the sixth studio album by Scottish DJ and record producer Calvin Harris. It was released on 5 August 2022 through Columbia Records. The album contains guest appearances from 21 Savage, Dua Lipa, Young Thug, Stefflon Don, Chloë, Coi Leray, Charlie Puth, Shenseea, Normani, Tinashe, Offset, Busta Rhymes, Justin Timberlake, Halsey, Pharrell Williams, Jorja Smith, Lil Durk, 6lack, Donae'o, Snoop Dogg, Latto, Swae Lee, and Pusha T. It serves as a sequel to his previous album, Funk Wav Bounces Vol. 1 (2017).

== Background and release ==
Funk Wav Bounces Vol. 1 was released in June 2017. Volume 2 marks Harris's first album in five years. The album includes 23 collaborators.

In March 2022, Harris seemingly confirmed on Twitter that there would be a sequel to his 2017 studio album Funk Wav Bounces Vol. 1 by writing "Vol. 2 is gonna be mad". On 20 April 2022, he officially announced that the album would be released in the summer via his social media accounts. The announcement featured a photo of a billboard with the album's title on it located near Indio, California. On 23 May 2022, Harris posted a teaser via his social media accounts with the caption "Friday". The teaser contained a snippet of a new song along with an accompanying video that shows an island with purple-tinted water, palm trees, and a pink-hued sky. On 30 June 2022, the release date for Funk Wav Bounces Vol. 2 was revealed as 5 August 2022, alongside a video trailer revealing the artists making guest appearances on the album.

== Singles ==
The album's lead single, "Potion", a collaboration with English singer Dua Lipa and American rapper Young Thug, was released on 27 May 2022. It was first teased by Harris on 24 May through the social media application TikTok. "Potion" is Lipa's second collaboration with Harris following "One Kiss", which was released in 2018. A music video was released for the song which features Lipa in four vintage outfits. The album's second single, "New Money", a collaboration with Atlanta-based rapper 21 Savage, was released on 1 July 2022. The album's third single, "Stay with Me", a collaboration with American singer-songwriters Justin Timberlake, Halsey, and Pharrell Williams, was released on 15 July 2022. It was teased by Harris on 6 July 2022. A fourth single, "New to You", with Normani, Tinashe and Offset was released on 29 July 2022. All singles were solely produced by Harris.

== Critical reception ==
Professional ratings
Aggregate scores
Source	Rating
Metacritic	60/100
Review scores
Source	Rating
AllMusic	3/5 stars
Clash	6/10
The Guardian	2/5 stars
The Line of Best Fit	7/10
musicOMH	2.5/5 stars
NME	4/5 stars
Pitchfork	5.2/10
Rolling Stone	3.5/5 stars
Slant Magazine	2/5 stars
The Telegraph	3/5 stars

On review aggregator Metacritic, Funk Wav Bounces Vol. 2 received a score of 60 based on 12 critics' reviews, indicating "mixed or average reviews". Hannah Mylrea of NME wrote that on the album, Harris "meshes a wistful grab-bag of influences – nu-disco, funk, boogie, soul – with his skill for creating a mega-watt pop-hit, taking listeners on a journey on a psychedelic trip you won't want to end". Maura Johnston of Rolling Stone opined that Harris is not "reinventing the dance-pop wheel with Funk Wav Bounces Vol. 2—the title alone shows that. But it's a fine wind-down album, one that can be put on shuffle at the end of a long-summer-night bacchanal".

James Hall of The Telegraph described the record as a "hazy collection of groove-driven vocal tracks" that "comes across as even more laid-back than its predecessor". Reviewing the album for The Guardian, Alim Kheraj characterised the album as "slinky disco-pop" but felt that Harris's "luxurious production doesn't disguise the dullness of the songs". Writing for Pitchfork, Owen Myers found when Harris "borrows from disco, electro-soul, boogie, and '80s R&B, the music is so wispy and unobtrusive it has the staying power of vape smoke at Coachella", elaborating that his "synths glide frictionlessly" and "vivid colors become pastel-toned playlist fodder".

== Track listing ==
All tracks produced solely by Calvin Harris, except for "Ready or Not", produced alongside Burns.

Funk Wav Bounces Vol. 2 track listing
No.	Title	Writer(s)	Length
1.	"Intro"	Adam Wiles	0:39
2.	"New Money" (with 21 Savage)	Wiles; Shéyaa Abraham-Joseph; Alissia Benveniste	2:48
3.	"Potion" (with Dua Lipa and Young Thug)	Wiles; Dua Lipa; Jeffery Williams; Jessica Reyez; Maneesh Bidaye	3:35
4.	"Woman of the Year" (with Stefflon Don, Chlöe, and Coi Leray)	Wiles; Stephanie Allen; Chloe Bailey; Coi Collins; Jade Amar; Germán Valdés	3:26
5.	"Obsessed" (with Charlie Puth and Shenseea)	Wiles; Charlie Puth; Chinsea Lee; Jesse Boykins III; Nathalia Marshall; Rachel Kennedy; Danny Flores; Lance Shipp	3:46
6.	"New to You" (with Normani, Tinashe, and Offset)	Wiles; Normani Hamilton; Tinashe Kachingwe; Kiari Cephus; Reyez	5:02
7.	"Ready or Not" (with Busta Rhymes)	Wiles; Trevor Smith, Jr.; Matthew Burns; Nija Charles	2:37
8.	"Stay with Me" (with Justin Timberlake, Halsey, and Pharrell Williams)	Wiles; Justin Timberlake; Ashley Frangipane; Pharrell Williams; James Fauntleroy II	3:49
9.	"Stay with Me" (Part 2) (with Justin Timberlake, Halsey, and Pharrell Williams)	Wiles; Timberlake; Frangipane; P. Williams; Fauntleroy	1:23
10.	"Somebody Else" (with Jorja Smith and Lil Durk)	Wiles; Jorja Smith; Durk Banks; Edith Nelson; Barbara Boko-Hyouyhay	2:58
11.	"Nothing More to Say" (with 6lack and Donae'o)	Wiles; Ricardo Valentine, Jr.; Ian Greenidge	3:53
12.	"Live My Best Life" (with Snoop Dogg and Latto)	Wiles; Calvin Broadus, Jr.; Alyssa Stephens; Bidaye	2:43
13.	"Lean on Me" (with Swae Lee)	Wiles; Khalif Brown; Boykins	3:52
14.	"Day One" (with Pharrell Williams and Pusha T)	Wiles; P. Williams; Terrence Thornton; Bidaye	3:20
Total length:			43:51

== Personnel ==
Musicians

- 6lack – vocals (11)
- 21 Savage – vocals (2)
- Alissa Benveniste – bass (2)
- Jesse Boykins III – background vocals (13)
- Charlie Brown – violin (6, 8–9)
- Ian Burdge (1st) – cello (6, 8–9)
- Busta Rhymes – vocals (7)
- Emil Chakalov – violin (6, 8–9)
- Reiad Chibah – viola (6)
- Chlöe – vocals (4)
- Coi Leray – vocals (4)
- Nick Cooper – cello (6, 8–9)
- Donae'o – vocals (11)
- Dua Lipa – vocals (3)
- Richard George (Leader of the 2nds) – violin (6, 8–9)
- Sara Hajir – cello (6, 8–9)
- Halsey – vocals (8–9)
- Calvin Harris – producer (all)
- Marianne Haynes – violin (6, 8–9)
- Ian Humphries – violin (6, 8–9)
- Charis Jenson – violin (6, 8–9)
- Patrick Kiernan – violin (6, 8–9)
- Latto – vocals (12)
- Lil Durk – vocals (10)
- John Mills – violin (6, 8–9)
- Perry Montague-Mason – violin (6, 8–9)
- Everton Nelson (leader) – violin (6, 8–9)
- Normani – vocals (6)
- Offset – vocals (6)
- Andy Parker – viola (6)
- Tim Pigott-Smith – violin (6, 8–9)
- Haley Pomfrett – violin (6, 8–9)
- Pusha T – vocals (14)
- Charlie Puth – vocals (5)
- Shenseea – vocals (5)
- Adrian Smith – viola (6)
- Jorja Smith – vocals (10)
- Stefflon Don – vocals (4)
- Snoop Dogg – vocals (12)
- Swae Lee – vocals (13)
- Justin Timberlake – vocals (8–9)
- Tinashe – vocals (6)
- Bruce White (1st) – viola (6)
- Lucy Wilkins – violin (6, 8–9)
- Pharrell Williams – vocals (8–9, 14)
- Chris Worsley – cello (6, 8–9)
- Young Thug – vocals (3)
- Warren Zielinski – violin (6, 8–9)

Technical

- Chloe Bailey – vocal producer (4)
- Bainz – miscellaneous production (3), recording engineer (3), vocal producer (3)
- Durk "Lil Durk" Banks – vocal producer (10)
- Jesse Boykins III – vocal producer (5)
- Burns – producer (7)
- Busta Rhymes – vocal producer (7)
- Brandon Buttner – engineer (8–9), miscellaneous production (8–9), recording engineer (8–9)
- Jelli Dorman – vocal engineer (6)
- Dre Z – recording engineer (4)
- Arin "Ajstayworkin" Fields – recording engineer (3)
- Steven Fitzmaurice – engineer (6, 8–9), recording engineer (6, 8–9)
- Jared "JT" Gagarin – recording engineer (11)
- Justin "Jusvibes" Gibson – recording engineer
- Chris Godbey – recording engineer (8–9)
- Mark "Exit" Goodchild – recording engineer (5), miscellaneous production (6–10, 12, 14)
- Kuk Harrell – vocal engineer (6), vocal producer (6), recording engineer (6)
- Calvin Harris – mixing engineer (1–7, 10–14), recording engineer (1, 3–6, 8–10), vocal producer (3–4, 6, 8–11)
- Tom Hough – recording engineer (11)
- JRich ENT – recording engineer (6)
- Dave Kutch – mastering engineer (all)
- Randy Lanphear – recording engineer (13)
- Mike Larson – recording engineer (8–9, 14)
- Damien Lewis – recording engineer (8–9)
- Delanie Leyden – recording engineer (7)
- Emma Marks – miscellaneous production (6, 8–9)
- Manny Marroquin – mixing engineer (8–9)
- Edith Nelson – recording engineer (10)
- Zach Pereya – assistant engineer (8–9)
- Adele Phillips – miscellaneous production (6, 8–9)
- Pusha T – vocal producer (14)
- Charlie Puth – recording engineer (5), vocal producer (5)
- Snoop Dogg – vocal producer (12)
- Trey Station – assistant engineer (8–9)
- Justin Timberlake – vocal producer (8–9)
- Marcos Tovar – recording engineer (2)
- Rob Ulsh – recording engineer
- Javier Valverde – recording engineer (12)
- Frank Vasquez – recording engineer (12)
- Anthony Vilchis – assistant engineer (8–9)
- Pharrell Williams – vocal producer (8–9, 14)
- Terrance Wilson – engineer (4, 8–9)

== Charts ==
Chart performance for Funk Wav Bounces Vol. 2
Chart (2022)	Peak position
Australian Albums (ARIA)	30
Belgian Albums (Ultratop Flanders)	112
Belgian Albums (Ultratop Wallonia)	134
Canadian Albums (Billboard)	9
Dutch Albums (Album Top 100)	28
Finnish Albums (Suomen virallinen lista)	27
French Albums (SNEP)	45
Irish Albums (Official Charts)	23
Japanese Digital Albums (Oricon)	13
Japanese Hot Albums (Billboard Japan)	60
Lithuanian Albums (AGATA)	14
New Zealand Albums (Recorded Music NZ)	18
Norwegian Albums (VG-lista)	8
Scottish Albums (Official Charts)	9
Spanish Albums (Promusicae)	36
Swedish Albums (Sverigetopplistan)	60
Swiss Albums (Schweizer Hitparade)	30
UK Albums (Official Charts)	5
US Billboard 200	17
