= Fair (song) =

Single by Normani
- Released: March 18, 2022
- Genre: R&B; synth-pop
- Length: 3:04
- Label: RCA
- Songwriters: Normani; Abby Keen; Felisha Fury
- Producer: Harv

Normani singles chronology
"Wild Side" (2021)	"Fair" (2022)	"New to You" (2022)

"Fair" is a song by American singer Normani. It was released on March 18, 2022, by RCA Records as a standalone single.

== Background and promotion ==
In December 2021, Normani appeared on The Ellen DeGeneres Show to announce that her upcoming debut studio album was "almost done." The song itself was first teased by Normani on December 31, 2021. During an Instagram livestream in February 2022, she asked her fans on how they would think the song would sound like. She herself said of the song, "this one is really unique and different for me, assuming that it is 'not what everyone is expecting.'" She further described the track as "genre bending for sure," as well as "just a great record."

The song was then used in a clip uploaded to TikTok on February 23, 2022. Another 10-second teaser was released on March 1, 2022, and shows the singer in a black Gucci bikini on the set of a photo shoot for the song. The single was officially announced that same day. Another teaser was posted to Instagram with the singer sitting down to paint. The singer offered more insight on the song after the announcement by saying "Vulnerability. Raw Normani. A different layer that you've never seen before." To her, the song reflects a point in her life "that was really honest" and signifies "growth" that she is able "to share with everybody else."

Normani performed "Fair" for the first time on The Tonight Show Starring Jimmy Fallon on March 18, 2022, the performance airing just thirty minutes after the song was released.

== Credits and personnel ==
Credits adapted from Normani and manager Brandon Silverstein on Twitter.

- Normani – vocals, songwriting
- Abby Keen – songwriting, additional vocal production
- Felisha Fury – songwriting
- Harv – production
- Kuk Harrell – vocal production, vocal engineering
- Jaycen Joshua – mixing, mastering
- Rachel Blum – mixing, mastering
- Jacob Richards – mixing assistance
- Mike Seaberg – mixing assistance
- DJ Riggins – mixing assistance

== Charts ==
Chart performance for "Fair"
Chart (2022)	Peak position
New Zealand Hot Singles (RMNZ)	33
South Africa Streaming (TOSAC)	64
US Bubbling Under Hot 100 (Billboard)	15
US Hot R&B Songs (Billboard)	14

== Release history ==
Release history and formats for "Fair"
Country	Date	Format	Label	Ref.
Various	March 18, 2022	Digital download; streaming	RCA	
United States	April 5, 2022	Urban contemporary radio	RCA	
