= Normani =

American singer (born 1996)

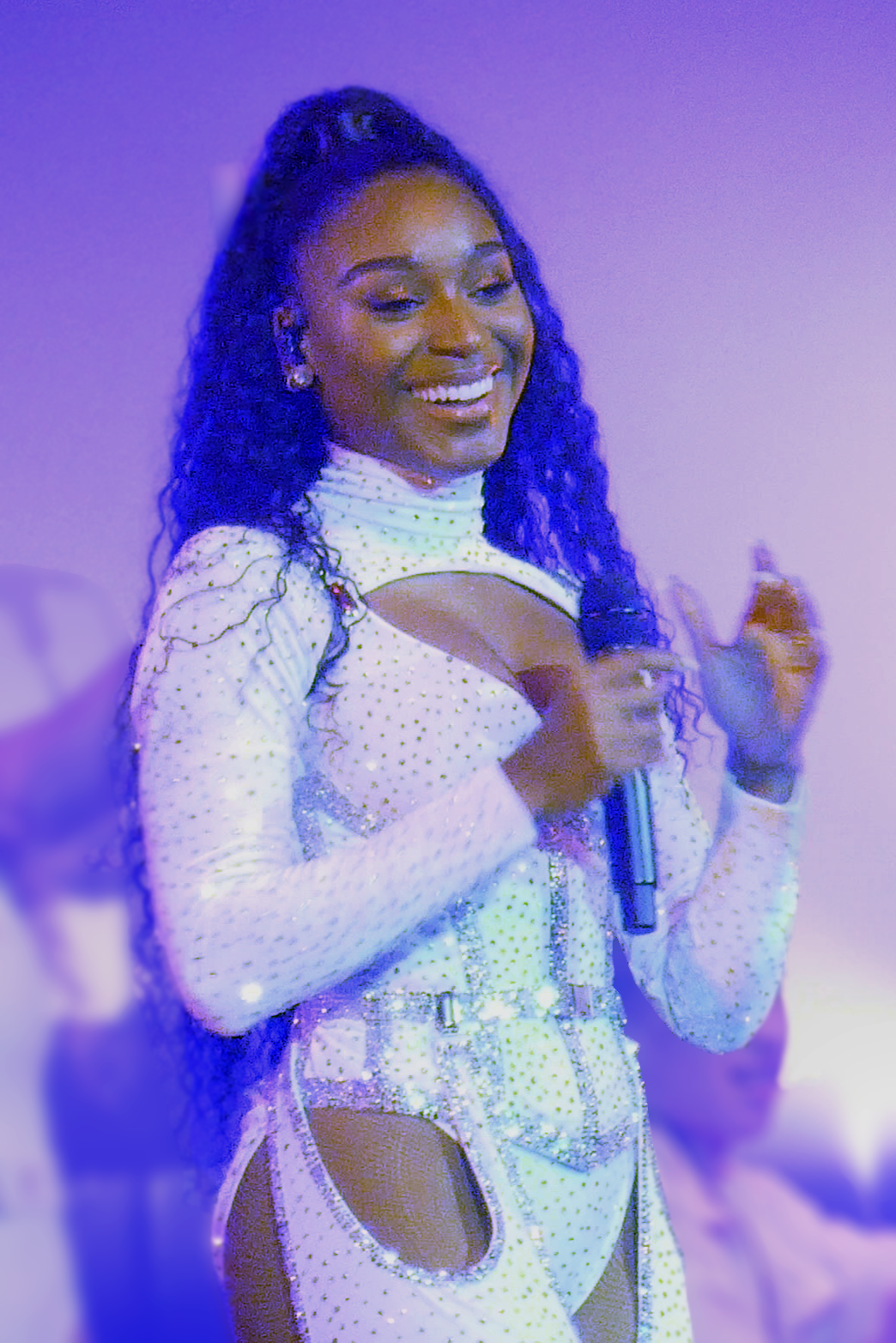
- Normani performing in 2019
- Born: Normani Kordei Hamilton; May 31, 1996 (age 30); Atlanta, Georgia, U.S.
- Occupation: Singer
- Years active: 2012–present
- Works: Discography (Note: For her works with Fifth Harmony, see Fifth Harmony discography and List of songs recorded by Fifth Harmony)
- Partner(s): DK Metcalf (2022–present; engaged)
- Awards: Full list
- Musical career
- Origin: Houston, Texas, U.S.
- Genres: Pop; R&B
- Instrument: Vocals
- Labels: Keep Cool; RCA; (2018–2025)
- Formerly of: Fifth Harmony
- Website: officialnormani.com

Normani Kordei Hamilton (/nɔːrˈmɑːni/ nor-MAH-nee; born May 31, 1996) is an American singer, dancer, and former member of the girl group Fifth Harmony, which became one of the best-selling girl groups of all time. She embarked on a solo career with her 2018 debut single "Love Lies" (with Khalid), which peaked within the top ten of the Billboard Hot 100 and received quintuple platinum certification by the Recording Industry Association of America (RIAA).

Following Fifth Harmony's indefinite hiatus, Normani released a two-song EP with Calvin Harris, Normani x Calvin Harris (2018). Her 2018 single, "Waves" (featuring 6lack), won a MTV Video Music Award for Best R&B Video. Her 2019 single, "Dancing with a Stranger" (with Sam Smith), reached the top ten in 22 countries, and earned a Song of the Year nomination at the Brit Awards 2020. Later that year, she released her first solo single, "Motivation" to critical acclaim. She appeared in the music video for Cardi B's 2020 single "WAP". Her debut studio album, Dopamine (2024), was led by the top 20 single "Wild Side" (featuring Cardi B).

Normani also collaborated with Ariana Grande, Nicki Minaj, and Megan Thee Stallion on the Charlie's Angels: Original Motion Picture and Birds of Prey soundtracks. In reality television, she competed on season 24 of Dancing with the Stars (2017) and served as an advisor on season 17 of The Voice (2019). As an actress, she made her feature film debut in the Anna Boden and Ryan Fleck-directed Freaky Tales (2024).

== Early life ==
Normani Kordei Hamilton was born in Atlanta on May 31, 1996, to Derrick and Andrea Hamilton. She has two older half sisters, Ashlee and Arielle. She was raised in Pearland, Texas, a small suburb outside of Houston. Normani attended private school as a child and was homeschooled from sixth grade. From the age of three, she competed in dance, gymnastics, and beauty pageants. She and her mother traveled between Houston and Los Angeles for acting, singing and dance auditions. She recorded a couple of songs, her first at age 13, and appeared in the HBO series Treme. Normani has said that dancing was her "first passion".

== Career ==
=== 2012–2018: The X Factor and Fifth Harmony ===
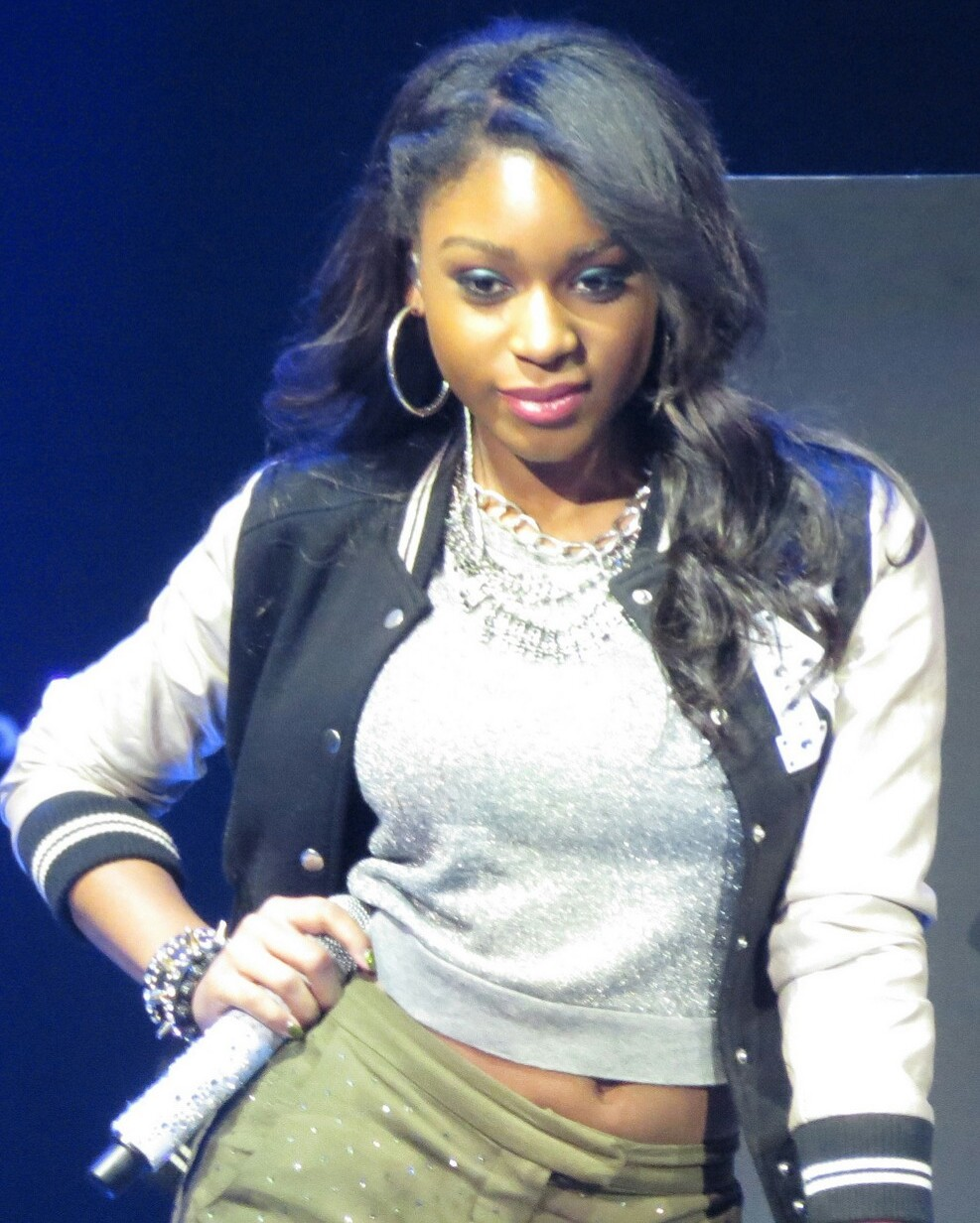
Normani performing at an iHeartRadio event in 2013 as a member of Fifth Harmony

Normani auditioned for the second season of The X Factor USA in 2012 with a performance of "Chain of Fools" by Aretha Franklin that earned approval from all four judges. She was cut during the second round of boot camp, but was invited back to the show to perform as part of a group with Ally Brooke, Lauren Jauregui, Dinah Jane, and Camila Cabello. That group, later naming itself Fifth Harmony, made it to the finale, finishing in third place.

In October 2013, Fifth Harmony released their first EP, Better Together. The group released their debut album, Reflection, in 2015, and their second album, 7/27, in 2016. The latter two albums spawned the hit singles "Worth It" and "Work from Home", respectively. After Cabello's departure from the group in December 2016, Fifth Harmony released their self-titled album as a quartet in August 2017. Time referred to them as arguably "the biggest girl group in the world" at the time. Normani became the quartet's de facto leader, leading solos and choreography. Her onstage confidence in the group caught the attention of executive Tunji Balogun, who founded RCA's imprint Keep Cool, and manager Brandon Silverstein, who began working with Normani in late 2017. On March 19, 2018, the group announced their decision to take an indefinite hiatus to pursue solo careers.

=== 2015–2020: Solo projects ===
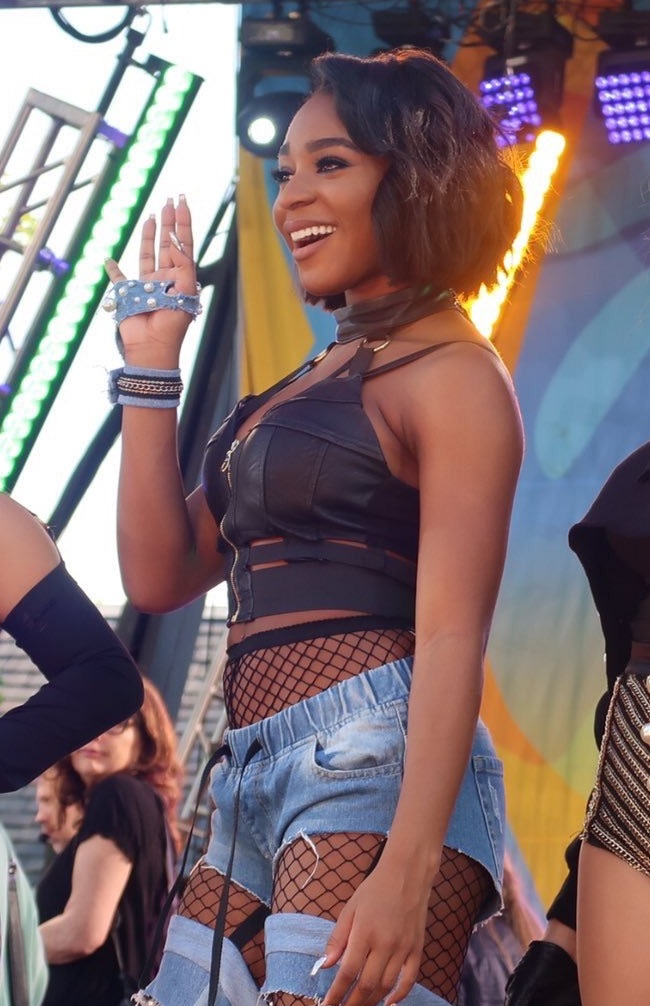
Normani performing in 2017 with Fifth Harmony

In 2015, Normani released two dance videos performing Future's "Fuck Up Some Commas" and Teyana Taylor's "Do Not Disturb" on her YouTube channel. From February 2016 through January 2017, Normani released covers of several songs, including Tory Lanez's "Say It" and mashups of Drake's "Fake Love"/"Sneakin'", and Solange's "Cranes in the Sky"/"Don't Touch My Hair", with the help of the producers The Invaders. Normani competed on season 24 of Dancing with the Stars from March through May 2017, alongside her dancing partner, professional ballroom dancer Valentin Chmerkovskiy. They reached the finals and finished in third place. In early August 2017, Normani had a cameo in singer Khalid's music video for "Young Dumb & Broke". In October 2017, it was announced that Normani had signed to management company S10 Entertainment as a solo artist. S10 Entertainment later partnered with Roc Nation to manage their artists, including Normani. She was also reported to have signed a publishing deal to Stellar Songs in early February 2018.

Normani's duet with Khalid, "Love Lies" from the soundtrack for romantic teen comedy-drama film Love, Simon (2018), was released in February 2018. It was included on the film's soundtrack of the same title, which was curated by Jack Antonoff. The song was considered a sleeper hit, reaching the top 10 on the Billboard Hot 100, and peaking at number 9 after charting for 28 weeks. "Love Lies" scored the highest first-week position for a single by a girl group member in the US, debuting at number 43 on the Billboard Hot 100. "Love Lies" reached number 1 on the Mainstream Top 40 chart, and charted for forty five weeks, tying the then record for longest charting song on the chart with Dua Lipa's "New Rules". The song was later placed on former U.S. President Barack Obama's 2019 year-end favorite songs list.

In April 2018, following Fifth Harmony's indefinite hiatus, it was announced that Normani had become the first ever artist to sign to Keep Cool/RCA Records, ahead of the release of her debut solo album. The following month, it was reported that Normani signed to a modeling contract with Wilhelmina. Over the next few months, Billboard announced that Normani was collaborating with Calvin Harris and Kehlani. In August 2018, Normani was featured alongside Kehlani on Jessie Reyez's remix to her song "Body Count", which was featured on Reyez's Grammy-nominated EP, Being Human in Public. She also appeared alongside Davido on Quavo's song "Swing", from his debut solo album Quavo Huncho (2018). That month, Normani signed on to a Puma campaign to endorse the brand's RS-0 shoes.

On October 22, 2018, Normani and Calvin Harris released their EP, Normani x Calvin Harris, which features the songs "Checklist" with Wizkid and "Slow Down". The following day, she performed the two songs alongside a new song, "Waves" featuring 6lack, at the Tidal X Brooklyn concert. She then released "Waves" and premiered it on the music radio station Beats 1 on November 15, 2018. The accompanying music video for "Waves" later won the reintroduced MTV Video Music Award for Best R&B Video. In December 2018, It was announced "Love Lies" was the most streamed song ever from a female artist by South Africa audiences on Spotify. Normani was also named the Top Female Breakout Artist of 2018 by Spotify. In her interview with Beats 1, Normani said that her debut album would be released in the first quarter of 2019, and its title is a number.

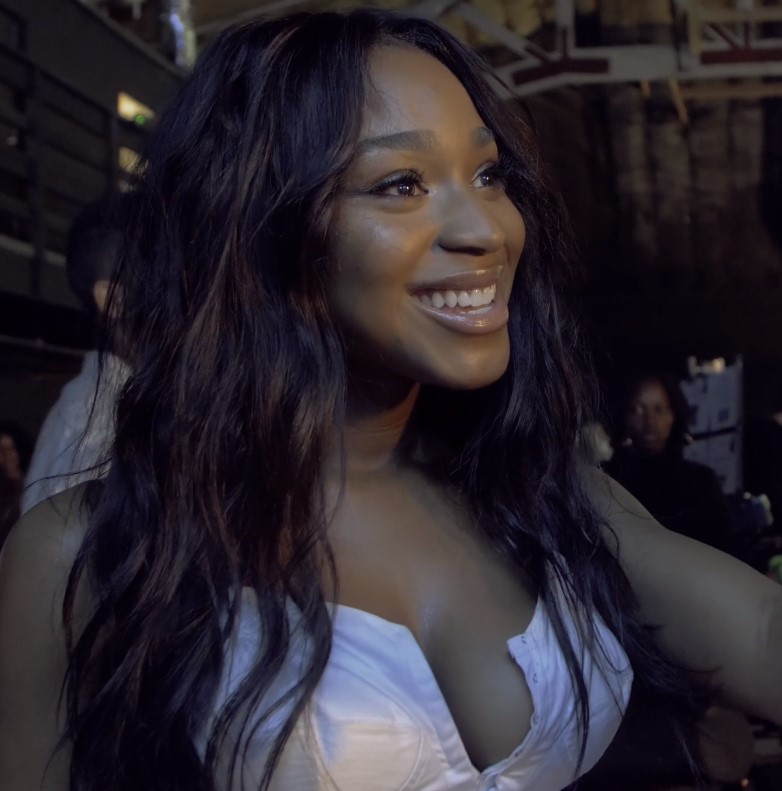
Normani in 2019

On January 11, 2019, Normani and Sam Smith released the song "Dancing with a Stranger", peaking at number 3 in the United Kingdom and number 7 in the U.S. The song reached number 1 on the Adult Top 40 chart. It was the most-played global radio song in 2019, according to Forbes. The song earned her a nomination for Song of the Year at the 2020 Brit Awards. One year into her solo career, Normani became the fastest solo artist (without an album) to surpass one billion combined streams on Spotify. In March 2019, she was the supporting act for Ariana Grande's first leg of the Sweetener World Tour in North America. In April 2019, the singer made a surprise guest appearance during Khalid's Coachella Valley Music and Arts Festival performance set.

In May 2019, Normani was named the most discovered artist by Indian millennials on Spotify India in its first 60 days, since the app was made available in the country on February 26, 2019. Additionally, Billboard announced that she was the most-discovered artist that brings Z, X and Boomers together on Spotify. In August 2019, Normani performed a set at Lollapalooza music festival. Later that month, she released the single "Motivation", co-written by Grande, and her first single without a featured artist. The song reached the top 40 in multiple countries, including the U.S., where it peaked at number 33. Its accompanying music video earned praise from music critics who compared her choreography to artists like Michael Jackson and Britney Spears. E! News dubbed the music video as one of the pop culture moments that defined 2019.

In September 2019, Normani performed a dance sequence on the Savage X Fenty Show by Rihanna, which premiered on Amazon Prime Video. Normani then announced that her debut album would be released in 2020, stating "it is a little more than halfway" complete. Later that month, the singer joined The Voice as an advisor. In October 2019, The Guardian ranked her as one of the 25 greatest female pop-group performers of all time. The following month, Normani was announced as the first brand ambassador of Savage X Fenty. Normani collaborated with Ariana Grande and Nicki Minaj on the song "Bad to You", for the soundtrack of the 2019 film Charlie's Angels, released in November 2019. Normani teamed up with the National Basketball Association for a holiday themed commercial, which included her reinterpretation of "Winter Wonderland" called "Ballin' in a Christmas Wonderland".

In January 2020, Normani joined rapper Megan Thee Stallion on the song "Diamonds", which served as the lead single for the soundtrack of the superhero film Birds of Prey (2020). Normani was named in the Forbes 30 Under 30 list for 2020. In February 2020, she was listed on BET's "Future 40" list, which is a list of "40 of the most inspiring and innovative vanguards who are redefining what it means to be unapologetically young, gifted & black". In June 2020, Normani joined Urban Decay as a global citizen and a campaign spokesperson for the makeup brand. In August 2020, Normani made a cameo in Cardi B and Megan Thee Stallion's music video for "WAP", alongside Kylie Jenner and Rosalía.

=== 2021–present: Dopamine and other ventures ===
In March 2021, it was announced that "Dancing with a Stranger" was one of the most-streamed songs by a female artist in the United Kingdom ever. On July 15, 2021, Normani released "Wild Side", featuring Cardi B. The song peaked at number 14 on the Billboard Hot 100, and reached number 1 on the Mainstream R&B/Hip-Hop chart. In August 2021, Normani made a cameo in Baby Keem and Kendrick Lamar's music video for "Family Ties". That same month, it was announced that she would star in the 2022 Pirelli Calendar. Normani also performed "Wild Side" as a musical guest act on Rihanna's Savage X Fenty Show Vol. 3, which premiered on Amazon's Prime Video service on September 24, 2021. In October 2021, she partnered with Steve Madden for a reprisal of their 1990s "Big Head Girls" campaign. The campaign helped lead the company to their highest quarterly sales in history.

Normani was awarded Best Dance Performance for "Wild Side" at the 2021 BET Soul Train Music Awards on November 28, 2021. She did an interview with Entertainment Tonight following her win where she was asked if she had a message for her fans. She responded with "Summer's gonna be lit" referencing when her album will be released. That same month, Normani collaborated with Google for an interactive Black Friday campaign, that helped highlight black owned businesses. She also starred in its accompanying commercial titled Google: Black-Owned Friday, which was directed by Daps, and featured an original song by Normani alongside rapper T-Pain, that sampled "Wake Up Everybody" by Harold Melvin & the Blue Notes. For her contribution to the campaign, Normani received multiple accolades including the Webby Awards, Clio Awards, and D&AD Awards. The singer was also awarded Collaborator of the Year at the Variety Hitmakers Brunch on December 4, 2021, honoring the meticulously picked collaborations released by the artist, while simultaneously updating the fans on the reasoning behind her album delay in an interview conducted by Variety.

Normani released "Fair" on March 18, 2022, and performed the song on The Tonight Show the day of its release. On April 6, 2022, the singer was announced as the face of Cracker Jill, for which she sang a reimagined version of the song "Take Me Out to the Ball Game", along with an accompanying music video. That same day, she was also announced as the face of AMI Paris' photo campaign for the French brand's L'Accordéon bag, according to Vogue France. On May 5, 2022, it was announced that Normani signed a publishing deal with Hipgnosis Songs Group. On June 6, 2022, Normani was featured on the remix of her childhood friend Josh Levi's song "Don't They". Later that month, Normani appeared in singer Chris Brown's music video for his song "WE (Warm Embrace)", though she received criticism from fans due to his extensive history of violence toward women. On July 29, 2022, Normani released the single "New to You" alongside Calvin Harris, Tinashe and Offset, for Harris' album Funk Wav Bounces Vol. 2.

In February 2023, she voiced the character Giselle, a member of the fictional '90s music group The Soul Vibrations, on the second season of the animated Disney+ television series The Proud Family: Louder And Prouder. In June 2023, Normani collaborated with Bose Corporation to release alongside a dance-themed commercial, previewing her single "Candy Paint". On August 7, 2023, Normani announced via Rolling Stone that she split with the management company S10 Entertainment, and signed a new management deal with managers Brandon Creed and Lydia Asrat. That same month, Normani partnered with Bose Corporation to design custom limited edition "QuietComfort II" headphones. According to Billboard, the headphones were an ode to her single "Candy Paint", and featured a "metallic purple colorway that channels a candy paint job on car".

On February 21, 2024, Normani posted a website called "wheresthedamnalbum" on X (formerly known as Twitter). She announced her debut album Dopamine, alongside its cover art, which was released on June 14. She released two singles off the album, "1:59" (featuring Gunna) on April 26 and "Candy Paint" on May 31, as well as one visual promotional video. It was later announced that the previously released single "Wild Side" would also be featured on the album. The project received mixed to positive reception, selling 12,000 album-equivalent units in its first week, 2,000 of which were pure sales.

In March 2024, to commemorate the 65th anniversary of International Women's Day, Normani was one of a number of celebrities had their likeness turned into Bratz dolls. On June 6, 2025, Normani was featured on a remix to singer Ciara's single "Ecstasy", which also featured Teyana Taylor. In November 2025, Normani launched her eponymous fashion brand in partnership with online clothing retailer Shein.

In April 2026, Normani competed in season fourteen of The Masked Singer as the wild card contestant "Crane". She finished in fourth place and did an encore of "Love Lies" with Khalid (who was the "bestie" that helped with the final clue). On July 6, 2026, she performed in an Aaliyah tribute, curated by Missy Elliott, for the finale at that year's Essence Festival of Culture.

== Artistry ==
Normani has a mezzo-soprano vocal range. Her music has primarily been described as pop and R&B, with elements of dance-pop, retro-pop, and hip hop. Normani has stated that she does not want to be musically limited and aims to be "genre-less".

Normani has taken inspiration from R&B and pop music of the 1990s and 2000s. She has also cited artist such as Aaliyah, TLC, En Vogue, Mya, Toni Braxton, Selena, Jhené Aiko, Destiny's Child, Mariah Carey, Janet Jackson, Beyoncé, Ciara, Lauryn Hill, Whitney Houston, Brandy Norwood, Alicia Keys, Jennifer Lopez, Madonna, and Britney Spears as influences.

== Public image ==
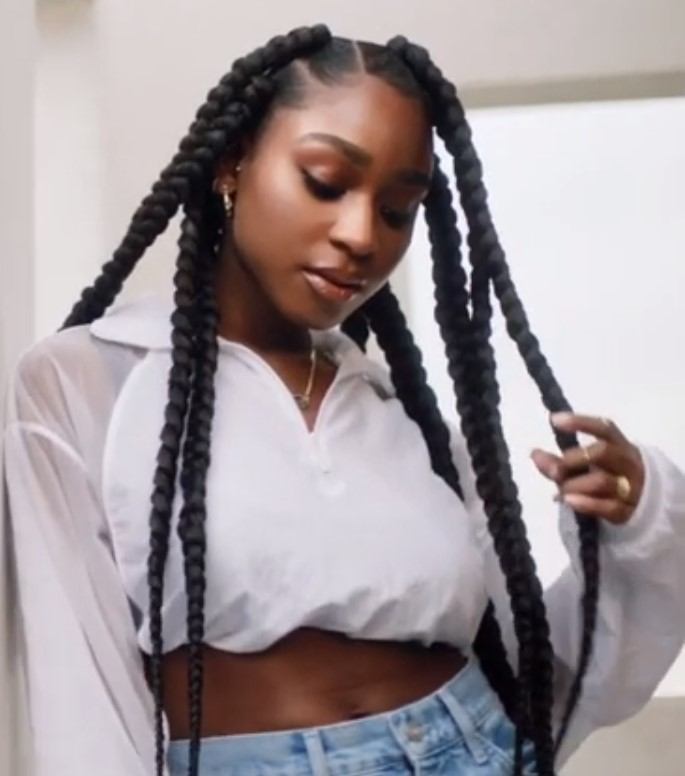
Normani in a campaign for Finish Line x Adidas in 2020

Writing of Normani's image, Vogue editor Lauren Valenti called her "the textbook definition of a bombshell". Several publications have referred to her as a "style icon". Elements of Afrofuturism have been incorporated in her fashion choices. Normani was voted among the sexiest female artist in pop in a 2018 poll by British radio network Capital. In 2022, she was placed on the Maxim Hot 100 list. Called an LGBTQ ally by The Hollywood Reporter, Normani was named an "up-and-coming gay icon" by Out.

In a 2020 cover story, Teen Vogue argued that Normani charted a "new territory that's rooted in relatability" for black women, while the singer proclaimed "I don't want to be so unattainable. I'm just the girl next door." The publication also noted the importance of her work with beauty and lingerie companies, and added that her resilience against the media's colorism "is for the black girls, who, like her, fail the brown-paper-bag test but are still a standard of beauty". Normani graced the cover of Rolling Stone's March 2020 Women Shaping the Future issue, alongside Megan Thee Stallion and SZA. Okayplayer and Uproxx named her among the black women who have redefined pop music, while The Recording Academy listed her as one of the black women who took pop music by storm and "reinvented the pop star ideal" in 2021. DeAsia Page of VICE stated that her success marked a shift "for an industry that tends to favor light-skinned Black women artists."

In 2019, The Guardian ranked her as one of the 25 greatest female pop-group performers of all time. Forbes placed her on their 30 under 30 list for 2020. In a 2019 cover story for Cosmopolitan, music journalist Clover Hope credited Normani with reviving pop music by "injecting some sorely needed fun" in a time when the musical landscape was consumed with singles that garnered attention "because of "hidden" messages about exes". Writing for The New York Times, Lindsay Zoladz stated that "Motivation" broke through the "depressive haze of contemporary pop radio" at the time.

With her intensely choreographed dance routines, Normani has been cited as one of the artists instrumental in the revival of choreography-centric music videos in the late 2010s. Speaking on the state of dance and music in 2019, music choreographer JaQuel Knight stated "we have the City Girls putting it down for Miami, we have Atlanta bringing out so many different sounds, and then we have pop-stars; the Normani's are trying to bring dancing back into the industry." Normani has received praise for her dancing abilities from fellow artists Katy Perry, Rihanna, and Cardi B. Further, Bustle declared that "there's virtually no better Gen Z dancer" than Normani. While Natty Kasambala of Dazed, wrote "since the launch of her solo career, she's consistently set the bar for pop visuals with elaborate choreography, trendsetting fashion and infectious hooks that stop people in their tracks."

Several of Normani's peers and contemporaries have cited her as an inspiration, including Zara Larsson, Lil Nas X, JoJo, Kelly Clarkson, CNCO, Becky G, Jessica Mauboy, WayV, and Dua Lipa. Drag queen June Jambalaya also named her as an inspiration for their career.

== Philanthropy ==
Along with Fifth Harmony, Normani was involved with the charities Girl Scouts of the US and the Ryan Seacrest Foundation. In September 2016, Normani was named the Diversity Ambassador for The Cybersmile Foundation, a non-profit organization providing support for victims of cyber bullying and online hate campaigns, after being racially abused online. In January 2017, Normani signed on to be the celebrity ambassador for the annual Stars & Strikes Celebrity Bowling Event & Tournament hosted by the Los Angeles charity A Place Called Home. In February 2017, it was announced that Normani partnered with American Cancer Society as a global ambassador to help increase awareness about the importance of breast cancer screening and HPV vaccination.

== Personal life ==
Normani is a Christian. She resides in Los Angeles, California in the San Fernando Valley.

In August 2016, Normani was heavily racially targeted on social media by fans of her former bandmate Camila Cabello, calling her slurs and photoshopping her image to depict her as a slave being "whipped, beaten" and lynched. The incident led her to temporarily deactivating her Twitter account.

Normani has been in a relationship with Pittsburgh Steelers wide receiver DK Metcalf since 2022. Metcalf announced their engagement on March 13, 2025, during his introductory press conference for the Steelers.

In October 2020, Normani’s mother Andrea Hamilton was treated for breast cancer. She was first diagnosed with the condition when Normani was five before it returned after nineteen years. In June 2023, Normani revealed that her father, Derrick, had also been diagnosed with cancer about a year following Andrea’s second treatment. Normani is an American Cancer Society ambassador.

== Discography ==
Studio albums

- Dopamine (2024)

== Filmography ==
Year	Name	Role	Notes
2011	Book	Bryn	Short
2012–13	The X Factor	Herself	22 episodes (2012); Guest: 1 episode (2013)
2014	Faking It	Herself	Episode: "The Ecstasy and the Agony"
2015	Barbie: Life in the Dreamhouse	Herself	Episode: "Sisters' Fun Day"
2015	Taylor Swift: The 1989 World Tour Live	Herself	Concert film
2016	The Ride	Herself	Episode: "Fifth Harmony"
2017	Dancing with the Stars	Herself	Contestant; season 24
2018	Lip Sync Battle	Herself	Episode: "Fifth Harmony"
2018	Sugar	Herself	1 episode
2019	Savage X Fenty Show	Herself	Appearance/Performer
2019	The Voice	Advisor	Season 17 for Team Kelly
2020	RuPaul's Drag Race	Guest Judge	Season 12 (2020); Episode: Gay's Anatomy
2020	Savage X Fenty Show: Vol. 2	Herself	Appearance
2021	Legendary	Guest Judge	Season 2, Episode 4
2021	Savage X Fenty Show: Vol. 3	Herself	Appearance/Performer
2022	That's My Jam	Herself/Guest	Along with Taika Waititi, Rita Ora, Taraji P. Henson
2022	Cardi Tries	Herself	Season 2, Episode 12
2023	The Proud Family: Louder and Prouder	Giselle (voice)	Episode: "The Soul Vibrations"
2024	Freaky Tales	Entice	Acting debut
2026	The Masked Singer	Herself/"Crane"	Season 14
2026	America's Got Talent	Guest judge	Season 21

== Awards and nominations ==
As a solo artist, Normani has won 45 awards, including seven BMI awards, a Soul Train Music Awards, an MTV Video Music Award for Best R&B Video, a Webby Award and a Teen Choice Award. Overall, she has been nominated for 82 awards, including nominations for the Brit Award for Song of the Year, and the People's Choice Award for Song of the Year.

== Tours ==
=== Supporting act ===
- Ariana Grande - Sweetener World Tour (2019)
