= Dopamine (Normani album) =

Studio album by Normani
- Released: June 14, 2024
- Genres: R&B; pop; hip-hop
- Length: 41:28
- Label: RCA
- Producers: Bizness Boi; James Blake; Tommy Brown; Dave Cappa; Jonah Christian; Rami Dawod; Mr. Franks; Jason Gill; Anton Göransson; Kuk Harrell; Harv; Jarami; Leather Jackett; June Nawakii; Nealante; Normani; Jacob Olofsson; Aaron Revelle; Tyler Rohn; Taylor Ross; Stargate; Starrah; Triangle Park

Normani chronology
Normani x Calvin Harris (2018)	Dopamine (2024)

Singles from Dopamine
- 1. "1:59" Released: April 26, 2024; 2. "Candy Paint" Released: May 31, 2024; 3. "All Yours" Released: June 14, 2024

Dopamine is the debut solo studio album by American singer Normani. It was released on June 14, 2024, through RCA Records. The album features collaborations with Starrah, Gunna, James Blake and Cardi B, along with contributions from Brandy and Victoria Monét.

Primarily a pop and R&B record, upon release it was met with generally favorable reviews and appeared on year-end lists, including Rolling Stone's best 100 albums of 2024.

Dopamine was supported by the singles "1:59", "Candy Paint" and "All Yours", as well as the previously released "Wild Side" (2021), which reached number 14 on the Billboard Hot 100. The album debuted at number 91 on the US Billboard 200.

== Background and development ==
Normani first appeared as a member of girl group Fifth Harmony, formed during the second season of The X Factor in 2012. Following the announcement of Fifth Harmony's indefinite hiatus in 2018, plans about Normani's debut studio album first emerged in July, when the singer announced that she had her album title ready. Between 2018 and 2022, she released eight singles, including "Motivation" (2019), which was going to serve as the lead single of her debut album, but did not make the final track listing.

On February 21, 2024, Normani announced the title of her debut studio album, Dopamine (an organic chemical), the album cover, and shared an audio snippet on her social media pages. Normani expressed that the album is "a representation of [her] evolution" and "everything [she had] gone through to get to this moment". She also touched on the expectations and pressure she dealt with while making the album, as well as having to struggle with both of her parents having cancer. In an interview with Elle magazine, Normani said that the album title "represents the highs and the lows [she has] endured" and that she wanted a title that encompassed everything that she felt she went through in her journey to get to this point in her career.

== Release and promotion ==
On March 23, 2024, Normani announced the lead single from the album titled "1:59", featuring American rapper Gunna, which was released on April 26. The album's release date was then announced during the song's release. Around the same time, Normani also started teasing the release of "Candy Paint", which had been previewed multiple times since 2022, and would share a pre-save link for the song on May 2. A teaser trailer for the album, subtitled "First Dose" was released on YouTube, as well as her social media platforms, on May 22. The trailer featured a guest appearance from Gunna for what was likely a preview of the "1:59" music video, as well as a new snippet of "Candy Paint".

"Candy Paint" was surprise-released as the album's second single on Normani's 28th birthday, May 31. It was later reported "Wild Side" (2021) featuring Cardi B would appear on Dopamine. "All Yours" was released as the third single from the album on the day of release. On June 11, 2024, Normani teased the album's upcoming release with a promotional video directing fans to call her hotline number, "Hotline 1:59." When called, the voicemail previewed a snippet from the album each day, ending with Normani saying, "Hey, it's Normani, leave a message after the beep." On June 12, 2024, Normani revealed the tracklist to Dopamine on all social media platforms.

== Critical reception ==
Professional ratings
Aggregate scores
Source	Rating
AnyDecentMusic?	7.0/10
Metacritic	73/100
Review scores
Source	Rating
Clash	8/10
The Guardian	3/5 stars
The Independent	3/5 stars
The Line of Best Fit	6/10
NME	4/5 stars
Pitchfork	7.4/10
Rolling Stone	4/5 stars

According to the review aggregator Metacritic, Dopamine received "generally favorable reviews" based on a weighted average score of 73 out of 100 from 11 critic scores.

Shahzaib Hussain of Clash described the album as "a debut that hits the programmed sweet spot, conversant with contemporary trends and greater R&B and soul traditions." Writing for NME, Nick Levine said that "it may have taken six years, but Dopamine sounds like the (damn) album Normani was meant to make all long." Pitchfork's Heven Haile found Dopamine to be a "solid reintroduction to Normani's sultrier side," while also ambivalently comparing it to Dua Lipa's Future Nostalgia in that a "mysteriously cool it-girl persona is thrilling in three-minute doses, but after a couple of tracks with big hooks, you come across some filler."

Nicole Vassell of The Independent wrote that even though "the album will satisfy lovers of understated soul, [...] after so long a wait, you might hope for a bigger dopamine hit than this." The Guardian's Michael Cragg said that "Dopamine understandably strives hard for perfection, but it can feel strangely anonymous at times"; however, he also said that "when Normani fully lets loose, [...] there's a real sense of that superstar everyone hoped to see back in 2018 finally taking centre stage on her own damn album."

=== Year-end lists ===
Dopamine on year-end lists
Publication	List	Rank	Ref.
Rolling Stone	The Best 100 Albums of 2024	32	
VIBE	The 25 Best Albums Of 2024	14	

== Commercial performance ==
In the United States, Dopamine debuted at number 91 on the Billboard 200, moving 12,000 album-equivalent units of which 2,000 were pure sales.

== Track listing ==
Dopamine track listing
No.	Title	Lyrics	Music	Producer(s)	Length
1.	"Big Boy" (featuring Starrah)	Normani Hamilton; Brittany Hazzard	Tommy Brown	Brown; Kuk Harrell^{[v]}	2:53
2.	"Still"	Hamilton; Darius Coleman	Brown; Lydia Asrat; Courtlin Jabrae; Michael Jones; Paul Slayton; Stavye Thomas; Salih Williams	Brown; Leather Jackett	2:32
3.	"All Yours"	Hamilton; Nija Charles; Abby Keen	Brown; Andre Robertson	Bizness Boi; Ari PenSmith^{[a]}; Brown^{[a]}; Harrell^{[v]}	3:28
4.	"Lights On"	Hamilton; Victoria Monét	Brown; Bernard Harvey; Parker Mulherin; Marshall Mulherin; Peder Losnegård	Brown; Harv; Lido^{[a]}; P. Mulherin^{[a]}; M. Mulherin^{[a]}; Harrell^{[v]}	3:45
5.	"Take My Time"	Hamilton; Arnthor Birgisson; Tiaan Williams	Brown; Jacob Olofsson; Jason Gill; Rami Dawod; Lukasz Duchnowski	Brown; Olofsson; Gill; Dawod; Harrell^{[v]}	3:18
6.	"Insomnia"	Hamilton; Monét; Tayla Parx	Brown; Asrat; Mikkel Eriksen; Tor Hermansen; Brandy Norwood; Tommy Parker	Brown; Stargate	3:49
7.	"Candy Paint"	Hamilton; B. Hazzard	Jacob Gago; Keynon Moore; LaQuan Hazzard; Tyler Rohn; June Nawakii	Brown	2:50
8.	"Grip"	Hamilton; B. Hazzard	Brown	Brown	2:10
9.	"1:59" (featuring Gunna)	Hamilton; B. Hazzard; Coleman; Sergio Kitchens	Brown; Aaron Revelle; Byron Ford; Jabrae; Moore; L. Hazzard; Marqueze Parker	Brown; Leather Jackett	3:12
10.	"Distance"	Hamilton; Sevyn Streeter	Robertson; David Hughes; Scott Carter; Vanessa Wood; Donnie Meadows; Avery Earls; Jerome Monroe	Bizness Boi; Triangle Park; Harrell^{[v]}	3:01
11.	"Tantrums" (featuring James Blake)	Hamilton; B. Hazzard; Coleman; James Blake	Brown; Blake; Steven Franks	Brown; Blake; Mr. Franks	3:10
12.	"Little Secrets"	Hamilton; B. Hazzard	Anton Göransson; Henry Walter; Brown; Revelle; Rohn; Taylor Ross; Nawakii; Chandler Durham; Dominique Jones; Kitchens; Moore	Brown; Starrah; Göransson; Rohn; Revelle; June Nawakii; Ross; Cirkut	3:50
13.	"Wild Side" (featuring Cardi B)	Hamilton; Belcalis Almanzar; Jorden Thorpe; B. Hazzard	Dave Cappa; Jonah Christian; Nawakii; Moore; Ross; Rohn	Normani; Nealante; Cappa; Starrah^{[p]}; Rohn; Christian; Ross; Nawakii; Harrell^{[p]}; Brad Bustamante^{[v]}	3:29
Total length:					41:28

Notes

- ^{^[p]} signifies a primary and vocal producer
- ^{^[a]} signifies an additional producer
- ^{^[v]} signifies a vocal producer
- "Still" contains a sample and interpolation from "Still Tippin'," written and performed by Mike Jones, Slim Thug and Paul Wall.
- "Wild Side" contains an interpolation from "One in a Million", written by Missy Elliott and Timbaland, and performed by Aaliyah.

== Personnel ==
- Normani – lead vocals
- Mike Bozzi – mastering (tracks 1–8, 10–13)
- Ohad Nissim – mastering (track 9)
- Jaycen Joshua – mastering (track 13), mixing (3, 7, 13)
- Rachel Blum – mastering (track 13)
- Patrizio "Teezio" Pigliapoco – mixing (tracks 1, 2, 4, 6, 8–12)
- Ignacio Portales – mixing (track 4), engineering assistance (1, 2, 6, 8–12)
- Serban Ghenea – mixing (track 5)
- Brad Bustamante – engineering (tracks 1, 7, 11–13)
- John Scott – engineering (tracks 2–4, 6, 11)
- Mike Seaberg – engineering (tracks 3, 7), engineering assistance (13)
- Mikkel S. Eriksen – engineering (track 6)
- Thomas Warren – engineering (track 6)
- Kuk Harrell – vocal engineering (tracks 1, 3–5, 8, 10, 13)
- Jelli Dorman – vocal engineering (tracks 1, 3–5, 8, 10, 13)
- Federico Giordano – engineering assistance (tracks 1, 2, 4, 6, 8–12)
- Jacob Richards – engineering assistance (tracks 3, 7, 13)
- Leslie Quinonez – engineering assistance (track 4)
- Bryce Bordone – engineering assistance (track 5)
- Chris Bhikoo – engineering assistance (track 7)
- DJ Riggins – engineering assistance (track 13)
- Brandy – background vocals (track 6)
- Gunna – vocals (track 9)
- James Blake – vocals (track 11)
- Cardi B – vocals (track 13)
- Josie Aiello – background vocals (track 13)
- Starrah – vocals (tracks 1, 13)

== Charts ==
Chart performance for Dopamine
Chart (2024)	Peak position
UK Album Downloads (Official Charts)	45
US Billboard 200	91
US Top R&B/Hip-Hop Albums (Billboard)	30
