= Waves (Normani song) =

Single by Normani featuring 6lack
- Released: November 15, 2018
- Genre: R&B
- Length: 3:35
- Label: Keep Cool; RCA
- Composer: Jonah Christian
- Lyricists: Normani Kordei Hamilton; Felicia Ferraro; Mary Weitz; Ricardo Valentine
- Producer: Jonah Christian

Normani singles chronology
"Love Lies" (2018)	"Waves" (2018)	"Dancing with a Stranger" (2019)

6lack singles chronology
"If You Ever" (2018)	"Waves" (2018)	"Only Want You" (2019)

Music video
- "Waves" on YouTube

"Waves" is a song by American singer Normani featuring American singer and rapper 6lack. Normani first performed the song at a Tidal X concert in Brooklyn in October 2018. The song premiered on Beats 1 and was released on November 15, 2018. The music video for "Waves" was released in February 2019 and won the 2019 MTV Video Music Award for Best R&B Video.

== Background ==
Normani originally performed the song without 6lack at a Tidal X concert in Brooklyn on October 23, 2018. Billboard reported on the performance, calling it "slow-churning" and its hook "intoxicating". Covering the concert, Paper called the song an upcoming single in October. The singer announced the song on Twitter and shared its cover art on November 14. "Waves" premiered on Beats 1 and was released as a single on November 15. Normani explained to Zane Lowe on Beats 1 why she chose to work with 6lack:

He's an amazing lyricist, and I feel like he took the record to a whole other level. I already love the record as is, but he totally exceeded any expectation I even had, which was pretty high, because I admire him as an artist.

"Waves" was serviced to radio and in January 2019 ranked No. 73 on the Mediabase rhythmic format. On February 9, 2019, Normani posted a teaser of the music video on social media, announcing that it will premiere on February 12. On March 13, 2019, Normani and 6Lack performed the song on The Tonight Show Starring Jimmy Fallon. MTV praised the performance. Questlove, who leads The Tonight Show band, later stated, "After some 2000 summed odd episodes of Late Night/Tonight I’ll say that Normani’s performance on #FallonTonight was one of the most impressive performance debuts".

== Composition ==
Musically, 'Waves" is an "alluring and hypnotic" R&B slow jam. The song opens with "atmospheric" synths, before being met with skittering percussion and throbbing bass bombs." Lyrically, Normani refers to a relationship she finds herself going back to on the song, singing "When I have you, wanna leave you/If you're gone, that's when I need you." Originally, the pre-chorus for the single, as well as some lyrics, were different, however it was changed once 6lack began working on the single.

== Critical reception ==
Jon Blistein of Rolling Stone called the track a "brooding break-up song", saying that Normani and 6lack both give "deft vocal performances". Rap-Up called the single a "seductive jam." Brittany Spanos, also writing for Rolling Stone, called the single "worthy of the type of star Normani sees herself as and wants to be." While MTV stated “Their voices sound heavenly together, both butter smooth and simply lush on the ear.”

== Accolades ==
Year-end lists
Publication	Accolade	Rank	Ref.
Billboard	The 20 Best R&B Songs of 2018	14	
Insider	The 57 Best Music Videos of 2019	44	
PopSugar	The Sexiest Music Videos of 2019	8	

=== Awards and nominations ===
Year	Award	Category	Result
2019	MTV Video Music Award	Best R&B Video	Won

== Music video ==
The music video was released on February 12, 2019, and was directed by Emil Nava. The video's opening sequence features Normani waking up on a deserted planet next to a white Beats Pill. She performs in various dance sequences in a sheer body suit and slicked-back bun, accompanied by dancers wearing identical costumes. The video is also intercut with scenes of her caressing a starry silhouette on a diving board in the sky, lying on a mattress floating on the surface of a dark ocean, floating underwater, and disappearing into a star field. 6LACK then appears on the surface of the Moon as he and Normani embrace while shooting stars fly past. The video ends with them holding hands as they lie on mattress floating in the middle of a submerged crater as the camera zooms out.

James Dinh for IHeartRadio described the collaboration as "brooding", adding that the clip feels "psychedelic" and "worth the wait".

== Personnel ==
Adapted from Tidal.

- Normani Kordei Hamilton – vocals, composition
- 6lack – vocals, composition
- Mary Weitz – composition
- Jonah Christian – production, composition, bass, guitar, keyboards, programming, synthesizer
- Tayla Parx – vocal production
- Colin Leonard – master engineering
- Tim McClain – mix engineering, record engineering
- Andrew Keller – engineering assistance
- JT Gagarin – record engineering

== Charts ==
Chart performance for "Waves"
Chart (2018)	Peak position
New Zealand Hot Singles (RMNZ)	36
US Hot R&B Songs (Billboard)	19
US R&B/Hip-Hop Digital Songs (Billboard)	17
US Rhythmic Airplay (Billboard)	33

== Certifications ==
Region	Certification	Certified units/sales
Brazil (Pro-Música Brasil)	Gold	20,000^{‡}
^{‡} Sales+streaming figures based on certification alone.
