= Normani x Calvin Harris =

EP by Normani and Calvin Harris
- Released: October 22, 2018
- Recorded: June 2018
- Genre: R&B; house
- Length: 6:14
- Label: Keep Cool; RCA
- Producer: Calvin Harris

Normani chronology
Normani x Calvin Harris (2018)	Dopamine (2024)

Calvin Harris chronology
Funk Wav Bounces Vol. 1 (2017)	Normani x Calvin Harris (2018)	Funk Wav Bounces Vol. 2 (2022)

Normani x Calvin Harris is a joint EP by American singer Normani and Scottish producer Calvin Harris. It was released on October 22, 2018, containing two songs: "Checklist" (featuring Wizkid) and "Slow Down".

No singles were released from the EP, however, the song "Checklist" peaked at number one on Billboard's World Digital Song Sales chart, and also charted in Ireland and in the United Kingdom; while the song "Slow Down" reached the top 40 on the Billboard's Dance/Electronic Songs chart.

== Background ==
According to Normani, Harris reached out to her for the collaboration; she said: "he was like 'yo, what do you think of this?' I was like, 'this sh*t is fire!' I am a huge fan of his." The pair recorded and finished the songs in June 2018.

News of the collaboration was revealed in June 2018. Normani teased the project at the 2018 American Music Awards, saying a song was to be released "in the next few days". Normani also posted a short clip online of herself writing "Oct. 22" on a piece of red tape before a voice off-camera tells her to "drop the pen".

== Music ==
The EP features two songs, "Slow Down" and "Checklist" (featuring Nigerian singer Wizkid). The former has a groovy, house-styled production in which Normani pleads with a lover to return her feelings. Wandera Hussein of The Fader praised Normani's vocal performance by saying the singer sings "heavenly" on the song's hook. "Checklist" features a danceable beat with heavy influences of Afrobeats and dancehall music. On it, Normani delivers some rapid, half-rapped flirty lines.

Complex noted that the two tracks feature a production style similar to Harris's 2017 album Funk Wav Bounces Vol. 1, "although featuring a more reggae-inspired edge". Rolling Stone called the songs "clubby R&B with tropical tinges", saying Normani hits a "bouncy pop stride" on "Checklist", and noting "Slow Down" "does exactly the opposite of what the title teases: it's a slow jam that builds up to a house-y dancefloor burner for the verses".

== Track listing ==
Both songs were produced by Calvin Harris

Normani x Calvin Harris track listing
No.	Title	Writer(s)	Length
1.	"Checklist" (featuring Wizkid)	Ayodeji Ibrahim Balogun; Brittany Hazzard; Adam Wiles; Normani Hamilton	2:49
2.	"Slow Down"	Jessie Reyez; Wiles; Hamilton	3:25
Total length:			6:14

== Charts ==
=== "Checklist" ===
Chart performance for "Checklist"
Chart (2018)	Peak position
Ireland (IRMA)	76
Netherlands (Dutch Tipparade 40)	19
Netherlands (Single Tip)	28
New Zealand Hot Singles (RMNZ)	22
Slovakia (Singles Digitál Top 100)	86
UK Singles (OCC)	98
US World Digital Songs (Billboard)	1

=== "Slow Down" ===
Chart performance for "Slow Down"
Chart (2018)	Peak position
US Hot Dance/Electronic Songs (Billboard)	37
US R&B Digital Songs (Billboard)	14

== Certifications ==
Certifications for "Checklist"
Region	Certification	Certified units/sales
Brazil (Pro-Música Brasil)	Gold	20,000^{‡}
^{‡} Sales+streaming figures based on certification alone.
