= Candy Paint (Normani song) =

Single by Normani

from the album Dopamine
- Released: May 31, 2024
- Recorded: 2021
- Genre: R&B
- Length: 2:50
- Label: RCA
- Composers: Tommy Brown; Jacob Gago; June Nawakii; Kenyon "KC" Moore; Tyler Rohn; LaQuan Hazzard
- Lyricists: Normani Hamilton; Brittany Hazzard
- Producer: Tommy Brown

Normani singles chronology
"1:59" (2024)	"Candy Paint" (2024)	"All Yours" (2024)

"Candy Paint" is a song by American singer Normani. It was released on May 31, 2024, by RCA Records as the second single from her debut solo album, Dopamine (2024).

== Background and promotion ==
On May 6, 2024, Normani announced that her single "Candy Paint" would serve as the second single from her debut solo album Dopamine (2024). The song was later released on her 28th birthday, May 31.

== Composition ==
Normani stated that "Candy Paint" is "a performance record first…", and further described the track as "Fun, energetic, bossy. It's bold. It's sassy but assertive".

The song features Normani singing about seducing her rival's romantic partner with the lyrics "I can make your n***a hit the race if I wanted / Baby, I could take your place if I wanted".

== Credits and personnel ==
Credits adapted from Genius.

- Normani – vocals, songwriting
- Tommy Brown – production
- Mike Bozzi – engineering
- Jaycen Joshua – mixing, mastering
- Mike Seaberg – mixing, mastering
- Jacob Richards – mixing assistance
- Chris Bhikoo – mixing assistance

== Charts ==
Chart performance for "Candy Paint"
Chart (2024)	Peak position
Japan Hot Overseas (Billboard Japan)	15
New Zealand Hot Singles (RMNZ)	34
US Hot R&B Songs (Billboard)	13

== Release history ==
Release history and formats for "Candy Paint"
Country	Date	Format	Label	Ref.
Various	May 31, 2024	Digital download; streaming	RCA	
