= Wild Side (Normani song) =

2021 single by Normani featuring Cardi B

Single by Normani featuring Cardi B

from the album Dopamine
- Released: July 16, 2021
- Genre: R&B; hip hop
- Length: 3:29
- Label: RCA; Keep Cool
- Composers: Normani Hamilton; Dave Cappa; Jonah Christian; June Nawakii; Keynon Moore; Taylor Ross; Tyler Rohn
- Lyricists: Normani Hamilton; Belcalis Almanzar; Jorden Thorpe; Brittany Hazzard
- Producers: Normani; Dave Cappa; Starrah; Tyler Rohn; Jonah Christian; Taylor Ross; June Nawakii

Normani singles chronology
| "Diamonds" (2020) | "Wild Side" (2021) | "Fair" (2022) |

Cardi B singles chronology
| "Up" (2021) | "Wild Side" (2021) | "Rumors" (2021) |

Music video
- "Wild Side" on YouTube

"Wild Side" is a song by American singer Normani featuring American rapper Cardi B. It was released on July 16, 2021, through Keep Cool and RCA Records. The song marks Normani's first radio single since 2019's "Motivation". It was written by the two artists alongside Keynon Moore, Pardison Fontaine, Starrah, Dave Cappa, Jonah Christian, June Nawakii, Taylor Ross, and Tyler Rohn, and was produced by the latter six and Normani. It is included on Normani's debut studio album, Dopamine (2024).

"Wild Side" received critical acclaim upon release, with praise for the song's vocals and production. The song contains an interpolation of Aaliyah's 1996 single "One in a Million". It was released alongside a music video directed by Tanu Muino, who also directed Cardi B's "Up"; and was choreographed by Sean Bankhead, who also choreographed the music video for "Up", and Normani's "Motivation".

"Wild Side" debuted at number 14 on the Billboard Hot 100, while peaking at number-one on the R&B Streaming Songs chart, the R&B Digital Song Sales chart, and Urban Radio. It was one of the most thumbed up tracks of 2021 on Pandora; and was the third most watched R&B music video of 2021 in the United States, according to Vevo. The following year, iHeartRadio named it the fifth most played hip hop song of 2022.

The song and its music video have been nominated for several accolades, including the MTV Video Music Award for Song of Summer, the Soul Train Music Award for Best Video of the Year and the MTV Europe Music Award for Best Video; along with winning the Soul Train Music Award for Best Dance Performance, and the UK Music Video Award for Best R&B/Soul Video - International.

== Background and release ==
Normani went on a two-year hiatus from music after the release of the single "Motivation", in part due to the COVID-19 pandemic and the return of her mother's breast cancer. During that time period her mother encouraged her to focus on her career and making new music; in the process, "Wild Side" was created. Normani posted a snippet of "Wild Side" to her social media on February 5, 2021, with the caption, "know it's been awhile". Cardi B heard the snippet and later joined "Wild Side" according to the singer, with Normani stating "I knew I wanted to do something with her, but I was already in rehearsal for three weeks for the music video. We had already been in rehearsal, and I called her stylist because he's also my stylist, and I was like, 'Yo, like, we gotta figure something out. Like this link-up has to happen. There's no other way. It just has to happen, there's no option.' And he was like, 'Actually, she mentioned "Wild Side". She was like, "Is it that 'Wild Side' song? Is it the 'Wild Side' song?"' Because I had posted the clip like two months ago".

After speculation of a collaboration between the two, Normani archived all but one post on her Instagram page on July 12, 2021, hinting at a possible relevant announcement. The following day, Cardi B stated that she had "a little secret" to tell her audience the following day. On July 14, Normani confirmed the title, release date and cover art of the collaborative single on her respective social media pages. The song was officially released on July 16 alongside a music video starring the two singers. It was later included on Normani's debut solo studio album Dopamine, which was released on June 14, 2024.

== Critical reception ==
"Wild Side" received critical acclaim upon its release. MTV News praised Normani's vocal performance, stating that she "delivers her silky verses with serenity and precision, sizzling with temptation and allure with every breath. She never leaves a moment unmilked; her voice masterfully floats along the song's subtle yet thumping production – sampling fellow R&B goddess Aaliyah's 1996 hit 'One in a Million'", and praised Cardi B's rapping on the song, noting that she "slides in with ease." For Pitchfork, Vrinda Jagota called it "a sultry R&B showstopper", adding, "If 'Motivation' was Normani's jubilant breakthrough, 'Wild Side' is the meticulously crafted showpiece that proves she's here to stay." For USA Today, Rasha Ali deemed it "a steamy, sensual slow jam." Victoria Moorwood of the Recording Academy, stated that the pair "struck gold" with the song's interpolation of "One in a Million".

In August 2021, Billboard placed the single on their 15 Best Aaliyah Samples in Modern R&B/Hip-Hop list. American gymnast Jordan Chiles, referred to "Wild Side" as one of her favorite songs. The song was named among 15 R&B songs that defined 2021 by BrooklynVegan.

=== Rankings ===
Critical rankings for "Wild Side"
| Publication | Accolade | Rank | Ref. |
|---|---|---|---|
| Amazon | Best Songs of 2021 | 97 | |
| Billboard | 100 Best Songs of 2021: Staff List | 77 | |
| Cosmopolitan | The 55 Best New Songs of 2021 | N/A | |
| Entertainment Weekly | The 10 Best Songs of 2021 | 6 | |
| NPR | The Best Songs We Missed in 2021 | 11 | |
| Okayplayer | The 21 Best Songs of 2021 | 20 | |
| Pitchfork | The 100 Best Songs of 2021 | 69 | |
| PopBuzz | The 50 Best Songs of 2021 | 7 | |
| Spotify | Editor's Pick: Best R&B songs of 2021 | 8 | |
| Stereogum | 70 Favorite Songs of 2021: Staff Picks: Chris Deville | 6 | |
| VIBE | The 21 Best Women-Led Collaborations of 2021 | 3 | |

== Accolades ==
Awards and nominations for "Wild Side"
| Year | Organization | Award | Result | Ref(s) |
|---|---|---|---|---|
| 2021 | MTV Video Music Awards | Song of Summer | Nominated | |
| 2021 | UK Music Video Awards | Best R&B/Soul Video – International | Won | |
| 2021 | MTV Europe Music Awards | Best Video | Nominated | |
| 2021 | Soul Train Music Awards | Video of the Year | Nominated | |
| 2021 | Soul Train Music Awards | Best Dance Performance | Won | |
| 2022 | ASCAP Rhythm and Soul Music Awards | Award-Winning Songs | Won | |
| 2022 | MTV Video Music Awards | Best Cinematography | Nominated | |
| 2022 | MTV Video Music Awards | Best R&B | Nominated | |
| 2022 | MTV Video Music Awards | Best Choreography | Nominated | |
| 2022 | BMI R&B/Hip Hop Awards | Award-Winning Songs | Won | |
| 2023 | ASCAP Pop Awards | Award-Winning Songs | Won | |

== Commercial performance ==
In the United States, "Wild Side" debuted at number 14 on the Billboard Hot 100, marking Normani's third top 20 solo hit, and Cardi B's 16th; while becoming Normani's highest debuting song to date. It was the top-selling R&B release of the week in overall consumption, debuting at number five on the US Digital Song Sales chart. The song also debuted at number ten on the US Rolling Stone Top 100, marking the biggest debut of the week on the chart. It also debuted simultaneously atop the R&B Streaming Songs chart, the R&B Digital Song Sales chart, and the R&B/Hip-Hop Digital Song Sales chart, while reaching number three on the Hot R&B Songs chart. In addition, "Wild Side" also debuted at numbers 27 and 108 on the Billboard Global 200 and Global Excl. US charts, respectively.

Less than three months after it was released, the song was certified Gold by the Recording Industry Association of America, for selling approximately 500,000 units in the US. The song reached the Top 10 on the Mainstream R&B/Hip-Hop airplay chart, after nine weeks. While later, reaching the Top 3 on the Mainstream R&B/Hip-Hop airplay chart, in the November 6, 2021 issue of Billboard. The following week, the single reached number-one on Urban Radio. In December 2021, it was announced that the song was one of the Top 20 most thumbed up tracks of 2021 on Pandora. On the January 1, 2022 issue of Billboard, the song reached number-one on the Mainstream R&B/Hip-Hop airplay chart, tying "Oui" by Jeremih for the fifth-longest march to number-one on the chart. "Wild Side" also reached the top ten on the Rhythmic Airplay chart, after 23 weeks on the chart, breaking the record for the longest climb to the chart's top 10 by a female artist, and the second overall, trailing only the 25-week wait of Los del Río's "Macarena (Bayside Boys Mix)". That year, IHeartRadio named it the fifth most played hip hop song of 2022.

== Music video ==
The official music video, directed by Tanu Muino, was released to YouTube alongside the song on July 16, 2021. The music video was choreographed by Sean Bankhead, drawing inspiration from Ciara's "Like a Boy" music video. The singer wears multiple outfits throughout the video, including a cutout black lingerie set with matching thigh-high boots in the first scene of the video, while doing exotic Yoga, a cropped leather outfit, and a leopard-print bustier. During her verse, Cardi B is featured completely nude wearing floor length hair extensions, while also embracing a nude Normani. Debra Paget in the 1959 movie The Indian Tomb, is briefly referenced in a scene from the music video.

The music video accumulated 1.5 million views in its first ten hours on YouTube, and cracked the Top 30 trending searches on Google. In December 2021, Vevo announced that the music video was the third most watched R&B video of 2021 in the United States.

=== Reception ===
For NPR, LaTesha Harris wrote "The video amplifies the single's debts to the past: dance moves inspired by Janet's 'Rhythm Nation'; visuals reminiscent of TLC, Blaque and Missy Elliott; and a direct nod to Golden Hollywood entertainer Debra Paget. And under all the pastiche is the intoxicating charisma of a star performer, a rare find these days, basking in the shadows of her foremothers." For The Los Angeles Times, Christi Carras praised Normani's choreography in the music video, commenting "When it comes to dancing, no one is doing it like Normani in 'Wild Side' video".

The music video received praise and support from fans and celebrities across social media including Halle Berry, Ariana Grande, Victoria Monét, and Megan Thee Stallion. On Twitter, Lil Nas X deemed it the "best music video" he had ever seen in his entire life, adding "I am in [awe]. I am inspired!" Multiple publications referred to it as one of the biggest music videos of 2021, including Nylon, The New York Times, and Dazed, with the latter also referring to it as one of the "best music videos of 2021". In February 2022, Cosmopolitan placed it on its 42 Sexiest Music Videos of All Time list.

=== Controversy ===
In July 2021, Rolling Stone published an article titled "Why Queerbaiting Matters More Than Ever", in which music journalist Moises Mendez II accused Normani and Cardi B of queerbaiting in the music video for "Wild Side", noting that the two musicians "are pictured naked and gyrating against one another". The article sparked a response from Cardi B, in which she criticized the journalist for not acknowledging her own bisexuality, after coming out in 2018, stating "I'm married to a man but I have express soo much about my bisexuality and my experiences wit girls. All of a sudden 'queer baiting' is the new word & people use it to the ground!" She also added that the reason her and Normani embraced nude in the music video was to conceal her pregnancy, which she had not publicly revealed at the time the music video was shot, commenting "you do know we was trying to hide a whole baby bump right?".

== Usage in media ==
In July 2021, a "Wild Side" dance challenge started trending on social media, with the hashtag #WildSideChallenge garnering 15.6 million views on TikTok within a few weeks, with Brazilian singer Anitta, actress Storm Reid, along with American singers Lizzo, and Ciara participating in the challenge. English musician FKA Twigs also filmed a pole dancing routine featuring the song that she posted on TikTok. Some fans sustained injuries while attempting to learn the choreography, with one participant fracturing their foot.

American rapper Megan Thee Stallion referenced the song in her "Tuned In Freestyle", from her 2021 album Something for Thee Hotties, with the lyrics "I wanna show my wild side, make them doo doo doo." In October 2021, Aespa member Karina performed a dance routine to "Wild Side" on the South Korean television program Knowing Bros. Later that month, singer Bryson Tiller sampled the single on his song "Are You Listening", from his Killer Instinct 2: The Nightmare Before mixtape. Brazilian singer Pocah paid homage to Normani in a photo shoot inspired by the song's music video. Comedian and singer D.C. Young Fly released an unofficial remix of the song.

== Live performances ==
Normani first performed "Wild Side" at the 2021 MTV Video Music Awards on September 12, 2021, after fans petitioned for her to perform on the show with the hashtag #LetNormaniPerform. The performance featured intense choreography, and a surprise cameo from Teyana Taylor, that paid tribute to Janet Jackson's live performances of "Would You Mind". It was positively-received by music critics. Pitchfork deemed it "the night's most exciting performance", while calling Normani "one of her generation's most promising stars". While Rolling Stone wrote, "Normani stole the show in 'Wild Side', with the night's official instant-classic VMAs moment". According to Deadline, the performance was one of two most popular moments on social media that night.

TMZ reported that the performance triggered complaints to the Federal Communications Commission "over what some say were raunchy displays".

Normani again performed an abbreviated version of "Wild Side" at Rihanna's Savage X Fenty Show Vol. 3, which premiered on Prime Video on September 24, 2021. Normani "delivered a visually stunning set in a green catsuit, spiky bun, and lucite heels against a bright red backdrop, channeling the futuristic vibe of her music video," according to Erica Gonzalez for Elle.

== Track listings ==
- Digital download/streaming
1. "Wild Side" (featuring Cardi B) – 3:29
- Digital download/streaming – Extended version
1. "Wild Side" (featuring Cardi B) – 3:29
2. "Wild Side" (featuring Cardi B) [Extended version] – 4:08
- Digital download/streaming – Kaytranada Remix
1. "Wild Side" (Kaytranada Remix) – 4:24

== Credits and personnel ==
Credits adapted from Tidal.

- Normani – vocals, songwriting, production
- Cardi B – featured vocals, songwriting
- Starrah – songwriting, production, vocal production
- Dave Cappa – songwriting, production
- Tyler Rohn – songwriting, production
- Jonah Christian – songwriting, production
- Pardison Fontaine – songwriting
- June Nawakii – songwriting, production
- Taylor Ross – songwriting, production
- Keynon Moore – songwriting
- Josie Aiello – backing vocals
- Jaycen Joshua – mastering, mixing
- Rachel Blum – mastering
- Brad Bustamante – engineering, recording, vocal production
- Jelli Dorman – engineering, recording
- Kuk Harrell – engineering, recording, vocal production
- DJ Riggins – assistant engineering
- Jacob Richards – assistant engineering
- Mike Seaberg – assistant engineering

== Charts ==
=== Weekly charts ===
Weekly chart performance for "Wild Side"
| Chart (2021–2022) | Peak position |
|---|---|
| Canada Hot 100 (Billboard) | 59 |
| Global 200 (Billboard) | 27 |
| Ireland (IRMA) | 77 |
| New Zealand Hot Singles (RMNZ) | 6 |
| South Africa (RISA) | 9 |
| UK Singles (Official Charts) | 49 |
| UK Hip Hop/R&B (Official Charts) | 16 |
| US Billboard Hot 100 | 14 |
| US Hot R&B/Hip-Hop Songs (Billboard) | 4 |
| US Pop Airplay (Billboard) | 28 |
| US Rhythmic Airplay (Billboard) | 6 |
| US Rolling Stone Top 100 | 10 |

=== Year-end charts ===
2021 year-end chart performance for "Wild Side"
| Chart (2021) | Position |
|---|---|
| US Hot R&B/Hip-Hop Songs (Billboard) | 46 |

2022 year-end chart performance for "Wild Side"
| Chart (2022) | Position |
|---|---|
| US Hot R&B/Hip-Hop Songs (Billboard) | 71 |
| US Rhythmic (Billboard) | 40 |

== Certifications ==
Certifications for "Wild Side"
| Region | Certification | Certified units/sales |
|---|---|---|
| Brazil (Pro-Música Brasil) | 2× Platinum | 80,000^{‡} |
| Canada (Music Canada) | Gold | 40,000^{‡} |
| New Zealand (RMNZ) | Gold | 15,000^{‡} |
| United Kingdom (BPI) | Silver | 200,000^{‡} |
| United States (RIAA) | Gold | 500,000^{‡} |
^{‡} Sales+streaming figures based on certification alone.

== Release history ==
Release dates and formats for "Wild Side"
| Region | Date | Format | Version | Label | Ref. |
|---|---|---|---|---|---|
| Various | July 16, 2021 | Digital download; streaming | Original | RCA; Keep Cool | |
| United States | July 20, 2021 | Contemporary hit radio | Original | RCA | |
| United States | July 20, 2021 | Rhythmic contemporary radio | Original | RCA | |
| United States | July 20, 2021 | Urban contemporary radio | Original | RCA | |
| Australia | July 23, 2021 | Contemporary hit radio | Original | RCA | |
| Various | July 23, 2021 | Digital download; streaming | Extended | RCA; Keep Cool | |
| Various | November 22, 2021 | Digital download; streaming | Kaytranada Remix | RCA; Keep Cool | |
| United States | March 29, 2022 | Urban adult contemporary radio | Original | RCA | |
