= Charlotte Lawrence discography =

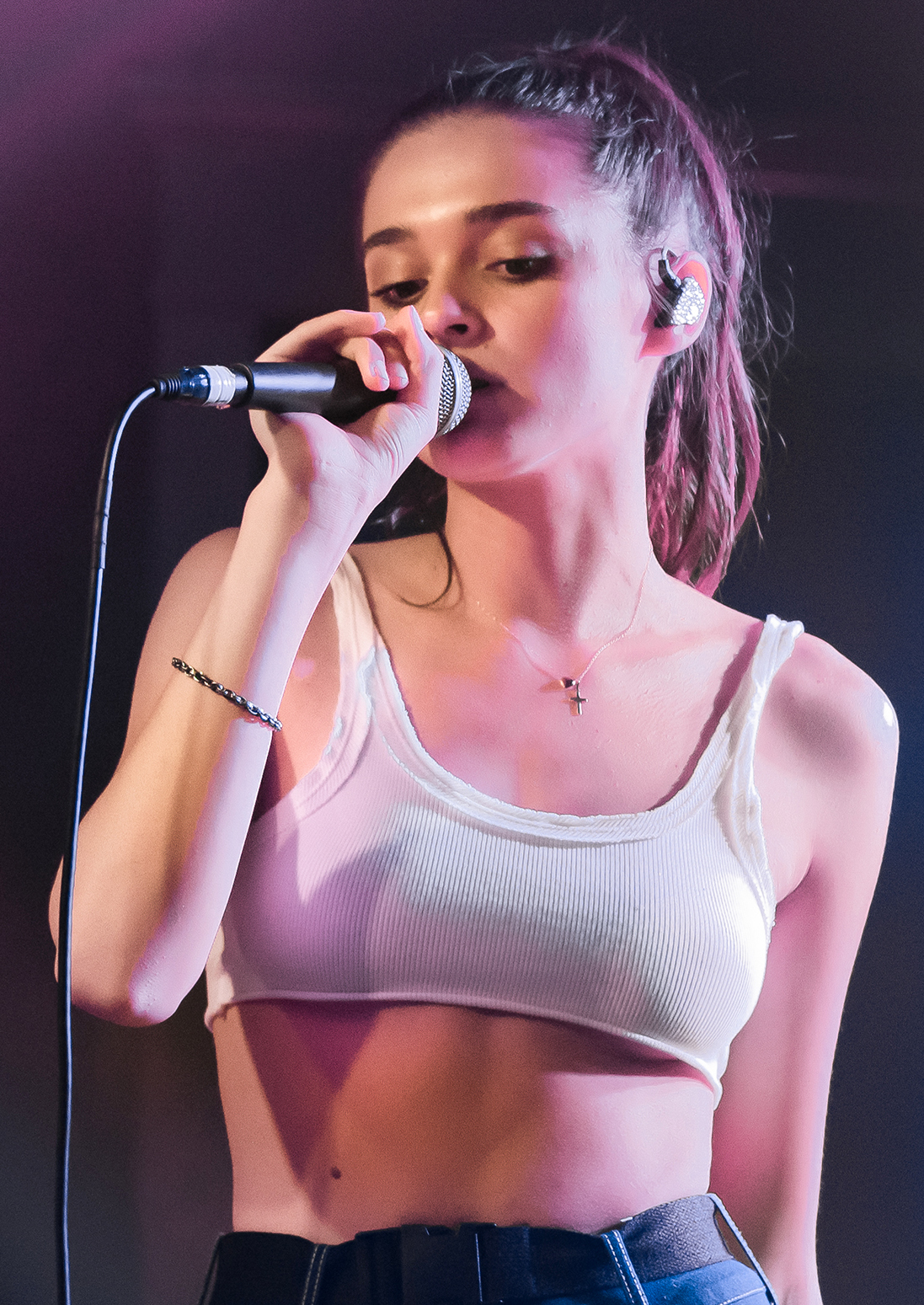
- Lawrence at Moroccan Lounge, June 19, 2018
- Studio albums: 1
- EPs: 2
- Singles: 29
- Promotional singles: 1
- Music videos: 10

American singer-songwriter Charlotte Lawrence has released one studio album, two extended plays, 29 singles (including 2 as a featured artist), and one promotional single. In 2018, she released her debut extended play entitled Young. Almost 3 years later, Lawrence released her second EP produced by Andrew Watt, Charlotte (2021). The EP was supported by two singles, "Talk You Down" and "You". In 2025, she released her debut studio album, Somewhere, featuring two singles: "Dog" and "Us Three".

== Albums ==
=== Studio albums ===
Title	Details
Somewhere	Released: June 27, 2025; Label: Charlotte Lawrence; Format: LP, digital download

=== Extended plays ===
Title	Details
Young	Released: June 22, 2018; Label: Human Re Sources; Format: Digital download, streaming, vinyl
Charlotte	Released: March 5, 2021; Label: Atlantic; Format: Digital download, streaming, vinyl

== Singles ==
=== As lead artist ===
Title	Year	Peak chart positions	Album
Title	Year	AUS Dig.	Album
"The Finish Line" (Snow Patrol cover)	2014	—	Non-album singles
"Ever After"	2015	—	Non-album singles
"You're the One That I Want"	2017	—	Non-album singles
"Seventeen"	2017	—	Non-album singles
"Sleep Talking"	2017	—	Young
"Just the Same"	2018	—	Young
"Psychopath" (with Nina Nesbitt and Sasha Sloan)	2018	—	Non-album singles
"Keep Me Up"	2018	—	Non-album singles
"Everybody Loves You"	2018	—	Young
"Young & Reckless"	2018	—	Young
"Wait Up"	2018	—	Young
"The Few Things" (with JP Saxe)	2018	—	Non-album singles
"Stole Your Car"	2018	—	Non-album singles
"Why Do You Love Me"	2019	—	Charlotte
"Navy Blue"	2019	—	Non-album singles
"God Must Be Doing Cocaine"	2019	—	Non-album singles
"Joke's on You"	2020	39	Birds of Prey
"Slow Motion"	2020	—	Charlotte
"The End" (with Alesso)	2020	―	Non-album single
"Talk You Down"	2021	―	Charlotte
"You"	2021	―	Charlotte
"Morning"	2022	―	Somewhere
"Bodybag"	2023	―	Somewhere
"Boys Like You"	2023	―	Non-album single
"I Don't Wanna Dance"	2024	―	Somewhere
"How It Ends"	2024	―	Non-album single
"Dog"	2025	―	Somewhere
"Us Three"	2025	―	Somewhere
"Tongue Tied"	2025	―	I Wish You All the Best

=== As featured artist ===
Title	Year	Album
"Cold as Stone" (Kaskade featuring Charlotte Lawrence)	2018	Non-album single
"You and I" (SYML featuring Charlotte Lawrence)	2022	The Day My Father Died

=== Promotional singles ===
Title	Year	Album
"Collateral"	2024	Non-album promotional single

=== Other appearances ===
Title	Year	Other artist(s)	Album
"Falling Skies"	2018	Yungblud	13 Reasons Why: Season 2 (Soundtrack)
