= Hollywood (The Puppini Sisters album) =

Studio album by The Puppini Sisters
- Released: 4 November 2011
- Genre: Jazz, vocal
- Length: 37:43
- Label: Decca
- Producer: Fred DeFaye

The Puppini Sisters chronology
Christmas with The Puppini Sisters (2010)	Hollywood (2011)	Best of The Puppini Sisters (2015)

Singles from Hollywood
- 1. "Diamonds Are a Girl's Best Friend" Released: 2011

Hollywood is the fourth studio album by the close harmony trio The Puppini Sisters, released through Decca on 4 November 2011. The album was released on 26 December in the United Kingdom. Hollywood is the trio's homage to the classic music of the silver screen. The album features ten cover versions of popular songs from films and musicals, as well as one original song written by the group. Hollywood was recorded with The Puppini Sisters standing round one microphone. It is the last album to be recorded with Stephanie O'Brien, who departed the group in 2012. Hollywood received mixed reviews from critics and charted at Number 16 on the Billboard Jazz Albums chart.

== Background and development ==
Marcella Puppini explained that Hollywood is the group's "expression of our love for the old icons of the silver screen." The Puppini Sisters re-arranged their favourite classic songs from old films and musicals. Songs on the album include a "cheeky" version of "Good Morning", the high-energy track "I Got Rhythm", "a delicately fragile" take on "Moon River" and an upbeat version of "Diamonds Are a Girl's Best Friend", sung in a minor key, which gives it a "sinister nature." The title track is an original song written by the trio. "Hollywood" is about "the pursuit of getting your name in lights". The Puppini Sisters recorded Hollywood "in the old-fashioned way" with the three group members standing round one microphone.

Hollywood was produced by Fred DeFaye, who previously produced the group's Holiday album Christmas with The Puppini Sisters. The Puppini Sisters hired Mad Men costume designer Janie Bryant as their creative director. Bryant created the wardrobe for the album and the subsequent tour. The Puppini Sisters released a video to accompany their version of "Diamonds Are a Girl's Best Friend" directed by Alex de Campi. Of the video's look, the director stated "We wanted to honour the Puppini Sisters' retro tradition while also reinterpreting it in a more contemporary, fashionable light. So our starting point were pulp novel covers and the pinups of Gil Elvgren via Vogue Magazine."

== Reception ==
The album received mixed reviews from critics. Hermione Hoby from The Observer gave the album two stars and quipped "Stylish, rather than substantial, it's filled with busy arrangements of standards such as 'I Got Rhythm' and 'Moon River', which, for the most part, are irritatingly light. Mannered perkiness reaches its nadir on 'Good Morning' – its fussy tempo changes, cuckoo clocks and spoken 'good morning's will have you wrenching the duvet over your head and groaning." Andy Gill from The Independent also gave the album two stars. He bemoaned the lack of "40s-style versions of pop hits", which he thought gave the group a "quirky appeal" and stated that Hollywood was not as enjoyable as previous albums. Gill went on to praise the group's versions of "Get Happy" and "Parle Plus Bas", calling it "the best idea here."

AllMusic's Jon O'Brien gave the album three and half stars out of four and commented that while the selection of songs might be predictable, the new arrangements allowed the group "to put their own mark on the proceedings." O'Brien liked the original track "Hollywood", saying that it could be "easily be mistaken for an old-fashioned jazz-hands number". The National's Si Hawkins awarded the album four stars. He praised the group's arrangements, saying "The Puppinis may not be the future of popular music, then, but they do wonderful things with its history, reinvigorating the familiar and forgotten with admirable care, and no little flair." Simon Gage from the Daily Express said the songs from Hollywood are "different from the originals, musically superb and, most of all, they put a smile on your face."

== Track listing ==
No.	Title	Writer(s)	Length
1.	"Hollywood"	The Puppini Sisters	3:04
2.	"Diamonds Are a Girl's Best Friend"	Leo Robin; Jule Styne	3:03
3.	"I Got Rhythm"	George Gershwin; Ira Gershwin	4:00
4.	"Moi Je Joue"	Gérard Bourgeois; Jean-Max Rivière	3:22
5.	"True Love"	Cole Porter	3:22
6.	"Good Morning"	Nacio Herb Brown; Arthur Freed	2:22
7.	"Get Happy"	Harold Arlen; Ted Koehler	3:40
8.	"Moon River"	Henry Mancini; Johnny Mercer	3:55
9.	"I Feel Pretty"	Leonard Bernstein; Stephen Sondheim	3:30
10.	"September Song"	Maxwell Anderson; Kurt Weill	3:03
11.	"Parle Plus Bas"	Larry Kusik; Nino Rota	4:22

== Charts ==
Chart (2011–12)	Peak position
French Albums Chart (SNEP)	117
UK Albums Chart (OCC)	97
US Jazz Albums (Billboard)	16

== Release history ==
Region	Date
Switzerland	4 November 2011
Netherlands	4 November 2011
France	7 November 2011
Denmark	7 November 2011
Spain	8 November 2011
Italy	8 November 2011
Austria	11 November 2011
United States	15 November 2011
Germany	18 November 2011
Ireland	23 November 2011
South Africa	2 December 2011
United Kingdom	26 December 2011
