= The High Life (The Puppini Sisters album) =

Studio album by The Puppini Sisters
- Released: 4 March 2016
- Recorded: 6 September – 5 October, The Premises Studios
- Genre: Jazz, pop, vocal, Swing
- Length: 44:05
- Label: Millionaire Records
- Producer: Fred De Faye

The Puppini Sisters chronology
Best of The Puppini Sisters (2015)	The High Life (2016)	Dance, Dance, Dance (2020)

The High Life is the fifth studio album by the close harmony trio The Puppini Sisters, through Millionaire Records on 5 March 2016. The album is the trio's first album with new member Emma Smith, replacing Stephanie O'Brien who departed the group in 2012. It is also their first album since leaving their major label Universal Classics and Jazz and Verve.

== Background and development ==
The High Life contains a mixture of original material (written by Puppini and Mullins) as well as their own takes on vintage standards such as "Accentuate The Positive" and "Tennessee Waltz" and the complete re-imagining of current pop and chart songs such as "Dear Future Husband" and "Chandelier".

This is the trio's first album with new redhead Emma Smith who joined the group towards the end of 2012 when Stephanie O'Brien and later Terrianne Passingham both departed.

To raise the necessary studio and marketing funds, the trio launched a crowdfunding campaign through Pledge Music allowing fans to purchase the single album, the LP, the double deluxe album in addition to many other limited edition products and opportunities such as; the chance to duet with The Sisters on stage, to be able to appear on one of the album's tracks, copies of their previous arrangements and executive producer rights.

By 17 August, the album was fully funded and recording commenced the following month at The Premises Studios. With the album being released in March 2016 (Pledgers were able to receive the album on 25 February), the trio embarked on a UK tour to promote the album culminating in a London show at Islington Assembly Hall with special guest male dance crew, The Hoppers.

The Bonus Remix edition of the album was released on 21 October and contained both the original tracks as well as multiple remixes from an array of acclaimed DJ's such as The Real Tuesday Weld and Bart&Baker.

== Track listing ==
No.	Title	Writer(s)	Length
1.	"Is This The High Life?"	Marcella Puppini	3:46
2.	"Accentuate The Positive"	Harold Arlen; Johnny Mercer	3:08
3.	"It Aint What You Do"	Melvin Oliver; James Young	2:30
4.	"Girls Just Wanna Have Fun"	Robert Hazard	3:18
5.	"We Love To Be Bop"	Puppini; Kate Mullins	3:14
6.	"Changes"	David Bowie	3:39
7.	"Rapper's Delight/Chandeliler Mash Up"	Travis Isaac; Sia Furler; Jesse Shatkin	2:39
8.	"Tico Tico"	Zequinha de Abreu	2:26
9.	"Work It"	Melissa A Elliot; Jerry Landis; Deborah Harry	2:53
10.	"Tennessee Waltz"	Redd Stewart; Pee Wee King	2:57
11.	"Material Girls Medley: Bills Bills Bills/ Dear Future Husband/ Cabaret-Money/ Bitch Better Have My Money/ Dirty Cash/ Material Girl/ Diamonds Are a Girl's Best Friend"		3:58
12.	"Supercalifragilisticexpialidocious"	Richard M. Sherman; Robert B. Sherman	3:12
13.	"Liar Liar"	Puppini; Mullins	3:20
14.	"Hit the Road Jack"	Percy Mayfield	3:06

Sample credits

- "Girls Just Wanna Have Fun" contains an interpolation of "Someday My Prince Will Come", written by Larry Morey and Frank Churchill.

== Personnel ==
Personnel adapted from The High Life liner notes.

- Marcella Puppini – vocals, accordion
- Kate Mullins – vocals
- Emma Smith – vocals
- Blake Wilner – guitar
- Henrik Jensen – double bass
- Peter Ibbetson – drums, synthesizer
- William Bartlett – piano, keyboards
- John Shenoy – clarinet, alto saxophone, tenor saxophone
- Fred De Faye – producer, engineer
- Neil Tollitt – engineer
- Jonjo Keefe – engineer
- Boris Balkarov -executive producer
