= Betcha Bottom Dollar =

Studio album by The Puppini Sisters
- Released: 31 July 2006 (UK)
- Recorded: 12–21 December 2005 January 23–26, 2006 Mayfair Studios, 16–18 January 2006 Studio Piccolo
- Genres: Jazz, pop, vocal
- Length: 41:29
- Label: Universal Classics and Jazz
- Producer: Benoît Charest

The Puppini Sisters chronology
Betcha Bottom Dollar (2006)	The Rise and Fall of Ruby Woo (2007)

Singles from Betcha Bottom Dollar
- 1. "Boogie Woogie Bugle Boy (from Company B)" Released: 24 July 2006

Betcha Bottom Dollar is the debut studio album by the close harmony trio The Puppini Sisters, released through Universal Classics and Jazz on 31 July 2006 in the United Kingdom. It was produced by Canadian composer Benoît Charest, whose music for the 2003 film The Triplets of Belleville inspired Marcella Puppini to form the group. Puppini and fellow band members, Kate Mullins and Stephanie O'Brien, arranged the songs on the album themselves. Betcha Bottom Dollar received mixed reviews from critics. It debuted at number 17 on the UK Albums Chart and became the fastest selling debut by a jazz artist.

== Background and development ==
The Puppini Sisters were founded in 2004 by Marcella Puppini. She was inspired by the animated film The Triplets of Belleville, which features a 1940s-style female singing group. Puppini explained "It was a revelation seeing these three ladies on stage in their matching outfits singing these close harmonies. I'd been thinking of forming some kind of harmony group. I've always been into choirs and harmony singing but I hadn't had an exact idea of what I wanted to do until I saw this." Tom Lewis from Universal Classics and Jazz signed The Puppini Sisters to the label after seeing them perform live at Trinity College of Music in London, where the girls had met. Lewis thought the group were "fresh, energetic and engaging".

The Canadian composer, Benoît Charest, who created the music for The Triplets of Belleville, produced Betcha Bottom Dollar. Puppini, Kate Mullins and Stephanie O'Brien arranged all the songs themselves and played as many instruments as they could on the album. Puppini commented "I mean, there's the harp, the accordion, the sax, the piano, the melodica … we're learning banjo. That's one of the most satisfying things about this group. It's very much a musician's band. Because we arrange for ourselves, we can arrange any music that we like." Betcha Bottom Dollar mixes traditional close harmony songs, like "Mr. Sandman", with more modern tracks like Kate Bush's "Wuthering Heights". The Puppini Sisters' released their rendition of "Boogie Woogie Bugle Boy" on 24 July 2006, as their debut single from the album.

== Reception ==
=== Critical response ===
Professional ratings
Review scores
Source	Rating
AllMusic	3.5/5 stars
Birmingham Mail	5/5 stars
The Guardian	2/5 stars
The Scotsman	3/5 stars

Betcha Bottom Dollar received mixed reviews from critics. Heather Phares from AllMusic stated "Taken individually, the trio's voices aren't spectacular, but they blend together nicely enough to create a convincing homage to the heyday of vocal harmony pop in the '30s and '40s. A very pleasant 'Mr. Sandman,' a pretty, languid 'Java Jive' and 'Sway' are among the best vocal pop standards on Betcha Bottom Dollar, but interestingly enough, the Puppini Sisters often sound less campy on the songs they remake than on the classics." Phares added that the styles the Puppini Sisters "adopt and adapt" saves Betcha Bottom Dollar from being "insufferably cutesy."

The Guardian's Maddy Costa gave the album a less positive review, commenting "The singing is charmingly cute throughout, but that's it: perfect for the Chordettes' track 'Mr Sandman', and surprisingly effective in a cover of Kate Bush's 'Wuthering Heights', but less comfortable in 'Falling in Love Again' (oh! for the seductive languor of Marlene Dietrich), and disastrous in a chirpy version of 'I Will Survive'." Costa thought that with so much of the Andrews Sisters' music available, she could not imagine anyone choosing Betcha Bottom Dollar over them.

Helen Brown, writing for The Daily Telegraph proclaimed "The covers of modern songs, such as the Smiths' 'Panic' and three close-harmony Cathys on Kate Bush's 'Wuthering Heights', will appeal to art-school ironists. But both songs quickly bugged the boogie-woogie out of me. Blondie's 'Heart of Glass' fares better, partly because Debbie Harry always sang it high and kitsch. Fans of the 1940s should treat Betcha Bottom Dollar with mucho mistrust and spend their cash on catching this act live."

A reporter for the Birmingham Mail thought The Puppini Sisters' were "quirky and original" on Betcha Bottom Dollar. Andrew Eaton from The Scotsman said "the skill and effort that's gone into the brisk, light-as-a-feather arrangements is very impressive, even if the joke wears thin as quickly as with any other novelty cover versions".

=== Chart performance ===
For the week ending 6 August 2006, Betcha Bottom Dollar debuted on the UK Albums Chart at Number 17. The album became the fastest selling debut by a jazz artist in modern history, outselling debut albums by Michael Bublé and Jamie Cullum. It sold around 13,000 units in its first week of release. Betcha Bottom Dollar spent 46 weeks on the Billboard charts, reaching a peak of two on the Jazz Albums chart and a peak of nine on the Top Heatseekers. The album peaked at Number 56 on the French Albums Chart and Number 79 on the Belgium Albums Chart.

== Track listing ==
No.	Title	Writer(s)	Length
1.	"Sisters"	Irving Berlin	3:04
2.	"Mr. Sandman"	Pat Ballard	2:35
3.	"Boogie Woogie Bugle Boy (from Company B)"	Don Raye, Hughie Price	2:27
4.	"Java Jive"	Milton Drake, Ben Oakland	3:34
5.	"Bei Mir Bist Du Schön"	Sholom Secunda, Jacob Jacobs, Sammy Cahn, Saul Chaplin	2:17
6.	"Wuthering Heights"	Kate Bush	3:35
7.	"Jeepers Creepers"	Harry Warren, Johnny Mercer	2:32
8.	"I Will Survive"	Freddie Perren, Dino Fekaris	4:00
9.	"Tu Vuò Fà L'Americano (Recitative)"	Renato Carosone, Nicola Salerno	0:43
10.	"Tu Vuò Fà L'Americano"	Carosone, Salerno	1:51
11.	"Falling in Love Again"	Friedrich Hollaender, Sammy Lerner	1:27
12.	"Heart of Glass"	Deborah Harry, Chris Stein	2:53
13.	"Sway"	Pablo Beltrán Ruiz, Norman Gimbel	3:07
14.	"Panic"	Morrissey, Johnny Marr	2:15
15.	"Heebie Jeebies"	Boyd Atkins	2:54
16.	"In the Mood"	Andy Razaf, Joe Garland	3:11

== Charts ==
=== Weekly charts ===
Chart (2006–08)	Peak position
Belgium Albums Chart (Flanders)	79
French Albums Chart	56
UK Albums Chart	17
US Top Heatseekers	9
US Jazz Albums	2

=== Certifications ===
Country	Provider	Certification
United Kingdom	BPI	Silver

== Release history ==
Region	Release date	Label
United Kingdom	31 July 2006	Universal Classics and Jazz
United States	1 May 2007	Verve
