= Christmas with The Puppini Sisters =

Studio album by The Puppini Sisters
- Released: 5 October 2010
- Genre: Holiday, pop, vocal
- Length: 34:23
- Label: Verve

The Puppini Sisters chronology
The Rise and Fall of Ruby Woo (2007)	Christmas with The Puppini Sisters (2010)	Hollywood (2011)

Christmas with The Puppini Sisters is the third studio album by the close harmony trio The Puppini Sisters, released through Verve on 5 October 2010. The album features ten cover versions of Christmas songs. The Puppini Sisters had always wanted to record an album of Christmas songs since their formation and group member Kate Mullins said recording the album was "a no brainer" for them. Stephanie O'Brien thought the album would be perfect for getting the listener into the festive spirit. Christmas with The Puppini Sisters received mixed reviews from critics. It charted on three Billboard charts, reaching a peak of Number 6 on the Jazz Albums Chart.

== Background and development ==
Marcella Puppini explained that the group had always wanted to record an album of Christmas songs since their formation in December 2004. Kate Mullins explained "Some of our first gigs were performing for Christmas parties at The Cafe de Paris in Piccadilly where Frank Sinatra and Marlene Dietrich have performed in the past, as well as for Vivienne Westwood Christmas party at The Cafe Royale so we already had quite a few festive songs in our back catalogue." Stephanie O'Brien commented that the group decided 2010 would be the year in which they would make an album of their favourite Christmas songs. While Mullins added that making the album was "a no brainer" and "the next logical step" for the group.

O'Brien believed that the album would be perfect for getting the listener into the festive spirit, while the "many fun and happy songs" would be good for getting someone through the shopping, entertaining and family get-togethers. Puppini branded the album "the swingiest, most festive collection of Holiday songs you'll ever hear." Christmas with The Puppini Sisters contains ten tracks, which range from contemporary Christmas songs like "All I Want for Christmas Is You" and "Last Christmas" to carols like "O Holy Night". Puppini told a reporter for NPR Music that "O Holy Night" is a song that "she holds close to her heart", calling it "amazingly crafted." Christmas with The Puppini Sisters is the group's third album and it was released by Verve on 5 October 2010.

== Reception ==
William Ruhlmann from AllMusic awarded the album three and a half stars out of five and branded it "an eclectic collection touching on their neo-swing tendencies." He commented that the jazziest track on the album was "Let It Snow" and added "The Puppini Sisters remain as much a tribute act [to The Andrews Sisters] as a revitalization of several eras of pop." A reporter for The Boston Globe gave the album a positive review, saying "It's fitting that a trio so indebted to the Andrews Sisters would include a cover of 'Mele Kalikimaka', the Hawaiian-themed Christmas song made famous by the Andrewses and Bing Crosby, on their new holiday release. It's just one of the many highlights on this terrific Christmas album that lets the Puppinis have a ball, from the jazzy waltz treatment of Wham's 'Last Christmas' to sultry seasonal staples such as 'Santa Baby'."

Andy Gill, writing for The Independent, gave the album two stars and stated "Christmas with the Puppini Sisters sounds pretty much like any other time with them: a full-on cheese-fest of wannabe Andrews Sisters vocal arrangements of material which is, due to the thematic restrictions, less liberally sprinkled with surprises than usual." Gill thought the groups version of "Last Christmas" was their "most daring interpretation", while "All I Want for Christmas" was not "too bad". Padraic Maroney from Edge Boston gave the album a mixed review. He thought the group excelled at singing the traditional Christmas carols, while the modern tracks lacked the fun of the originals. He added "The Puppini Sisters would have delivered a real present for listeners if they had kept things to just the more traditional songs."

== Track listing ==
No.	Title	Writer(s)	Length
1.	"Step into Christmas"	Elton John; Bernie Taupin	3:41
2.	"Santa Baby"	Joan Javits; Philip Springer; Tony Springer	3:24
3.	"Here Comes Santa Claus"	Gene Autry; Oakley Haldeman	3:02
4.	"Last Christmas"	George Michael	5:03
5.	"Let It Snow"	Sammy Cahn; Jule Styne	3:25
6.	"White Christmas"	Irving Berlin	3:18
7.	"All I Want for Christmas"	Walter Afanasieff; Mariah Carey	3:21
8.	"Mele Kalikimaka"	Robert Alexander Anderson	2:56
9.	"Winter Wonderland"	Felix Bernard; Richard B. Smith	2:24
10.	"O Holy Night"	Adolphe Adam; Placide Cappeau	3:52

Note: the track timings listed on the CD insert are incorrect, all being significantly longer than the correct timings which are shown above.

== Charts ==
Chart (2010)	Peak position
US Top Heatseekers (Billboard)	9
US Top Holiday Albums (Billboard)	16
US Jazz Albums (Billboard)	6
