= High on Life =

High on Life may refer to:

- High on Life (video game), published by Squanch Games
- "High on Life" (song), by Martin Garrix featuring Bonn.
- High on Life, an exhibition at American Visionary Art Museum
- High on Life, an album by QFX
- "High on Life", a song by Christopher from Told You So
- "High on Life", a song by Darius Rucker from Southern Style
- "High on Life", a song by Def Tech from Def Tech
- "High on Life", a song by DJ Encore feat. Engelina
- "High on Life", a song by DJ Force & The Evolution
- "High on Life", a song by Justin Moore from the deluxe edition of Late Nights and Longnecks
- "High on Life", a song by Kwesta feat. Tia Black from DaKAR
- "High on Life", a song by Rasputina from Frustration Plantation
- "High on Life", a song by Rebelution from Falling into Place
- "High on Life", a song by Shalamar from Uptown Festival
- "High on Life", a song by Gene Vincent from The Day the World Turned Blue
- High on Life, a fictional band in National Lampoon's Senior Trip

== See also ==
- High Off Life, a 2020 album by Future
- High life (disambiguation)
