= Slow Motion (Charlotte Lawrence song) =

2020 single by Charlotte Lawrence

Single by Charlotte Lawrence
- Released: July 24, 2020
- Genre: Pop
- Length: 3:03
- Label: Atlantic
- Songwriters: Charlotte Lawrence; Ali Tamposi; Andrew Wotman; Jason Evigan
- Producers: Jason Evigan; Andrew Watt

Charlotte Lawrence singles chronology
"Joke's on You" (2020)	"Slow Motion" (2020)	"The End" (2020)

Music video
- "Slow Motion" on YouTube

"Slow Motion" is a song by American singer-songwriter Charlotte Lawrence, released on July 24, 2020, through Atlantic Records. It was later included in her second extended play, Charlotte (2021).

== Background ==
Following her non-album single "Why Do You Love Me" and a soundtrack single "Joke's on You" from the Birds of Prey soundtrack, Lawrence released "Slow Motion" alongside a music video directed by Tyler Shields and filmed during quarantine. She further comfirmed that work on her debut studio album had been completed.

Lawrence explained that "Slow Motion" is "about knowing a relationship has to end, and how hard the heartbreak is and will continue to be"; but she described it as coming from a place of "having the confidence and strength to know that removing yourself from a bad situation is the right thing to do".

== Composition ==
Co-written by Andrew Watt, Jason Evigan, and Ali Tamposi, "Slow Motion" is a pop ballad that is into the breakdown of a relationship. It was made during COVID-19 and is into Lawrence's control for delivering high notes, according to Notion's Aimee Phillips. She described the song as showing her ability to gently hit a high note. Ones to Watch's Ruby Scott noted it as "an ethereal waltz of heartbreak, lingering feelings, and eventual acceptance."

== Personnel ==
Credits were adapted from AllMusic.

- Ali Tamposi – composer
- Andrew Watt – guitar, producer, programmer, background vocals
- Andrew Wotman – composer
- Charlotte Lawrence – composer, lead vocal, background vocals
- Jason Evigan – composer, drums, instrumentation, keyboards, producer, strings
- Johan Lenox – piano
- Lionel Crasta – engineer
- Manny Marroquin – mixing
- Paul Lamalfa – engineer, mixing engineer
