= Let Me Fly =

Let Me Fly may refer to:

- Let Me Fly (album), a 2017 album by Mike + The Mechanics
- "Let Me Fly" (Debbie Scerri song), the Maltese entry in the Eurovision Song Contest 1997
- "Let Me Fly" (Styles & Breeze song)
- "Let Me Fly" (DMX song)
- "Let Me Fly", a song by Status Quo from If You Can't Stand the Heat..., 1978
