= The Rise & Fall of Ruby Woo =

The Rise and Fall of Ruby Woo

Studio album by The Puppini Sisters
- Released: 1 October 2007
- Recorded: Air Studios; Kensaltown Studios; RAK Studios & Little Big Room; Nashville; United States
- Genres: Jazz, pop, vocal
- Length: 47:24
- Label: Universal Classics and Jazz
- Producers: Martin Terefe, Jon Hall, The Puppini Sisters

The Puppini Sisters chronology
Betcha Bottom Dollar (2006)	The Rise and Fall of Ruby Woo (2007)	Christmas with The Puppini Sisters (2010)

Singles from The Rise and Fall of Ruby Woo
- 1. "Spooky" Released: 2007; 2. "Jilted" Released: 2008; 3. "I Can't Believe I'm Not A Millionaire" Released: 2008

The Rise and Fall of Ruby Woo is the second studio album by the close harmony trio The Puppini Sisters through Universal Classics and Jazz on 1 October 2007 in the United Kingdom.

== Background and development ==
The Rise and Fall of Ruby Woo contains covers of popular songs like "Walk Like an Egyptian" and "Crazy in Love" and five original tracks written by The Puppini Sisters themselves. Stephanie O'Brien wrote a song called "Soho Nights", which is based on London's Soho and her experience of going out with a good friend for two years, before he broke up with her. Marcella Puppini added "We've created lots of other things, lots of different influences: the tango feel – it's a bit wonky. Even the band sort of … loosened up a little bit. We play a lot more of our own instruments as well." The album was recorded at Air Studios, Kensaltown Studios, RAK Studios & Little Big Room and in Nashville and the United States.

The title of the album is a tribute to the group's favourite lipstick, Ruby Woo by MAC Cosmetics. Puppini explained that Ruby Woo lipstick is used by women who "are outside of the norm", such as burlesque performers and those who are alternative. It is also "a quite famous shade", used by celebrities like Dita Von Teese. The Rise and Fall refer to the songs on the album. It starts off with happier songs like "Walk Like an Egyptian", then gets bittersweet with "Soho Nights" and "Jilted", before closing with "We Have All the Time in the World", which starts the rise again. Kate Mullins commented "Ruby Woo kind of personifies the woman who's unafraid to be kind of different and be flamboyant and stand up for herself. And there are pits and troughs in life, and that's kind of all it was really."

== Reception ==
=== Critical response ===
Professional ratings
Review scores
Source	Rating
AllMusic	3/5 stars
Boston Herald	B−
The Guardian	3/5 stars

Liz Hoggard from The Guardian gave the album a positive review, stating "Fans of the Puppinis' three-part harmonies (among them Prince Charles) won't be disappointed by their second album, which mixes covers with original compositions. It's their most daring tracks that work the best. Beyonce's 'Crazy in Love' is an exuberant jazzy deconstruction; Barry Manilow's 'Could It Be Magic' voices the love Barry certainly never dares to name; while their own composition, 'And She Sang', is a Fellini film in miniature. And if you really want to wallow, go straight to 'We Have All the Time in the World'. You won't hear a more exquisite track all year."

AllMusic's Rovi commented that The Rise and Fall of Ruby Woo follows a similar template to The Puppini Sisters' debut album Betcha Bottom Dollar and while that it is "fine as far as it goes", the joke was wearing thin. He continued "The Puppini Sisters' salvation is clearly in their original material. All three Sisters write solid tunes; the sooner they can come up with a full album's worth of original tunes, the better their career prospects will be."

Kevin R. Convey, writing for the Boston Herald, said "On their sophomore set, the UK-based Puppinis (not actual siblings) attempt to build their new-millennium-Andrews-Sisters shtick into more mature, musically accomplished territory. Sometimes the quirky covers work: The locomotive rhythm that propels 'Spooky' is pure genius, as is the upright bass and violin treatment of Beyonce's 'Crazy in Love'. And the Middle Eastern yodeling that punctuates "Walk Like an Egyptian" is as innovative as it is hilarious. But even with some solid originals, the formula occasionally backfires".

=== Chart performance ===
The Rise and Fall of Ruby Woo debuted on the UK Albums Chart at Number 73. The album spent 14 weeks on the Billboard charts, reaching Number 9 on the Jazz Albums chart. In France, The Rise and Fall of Ruby Woo spent 15 weeks on the albums chart, reaching a peak of Number 43.

== Track listing ==
No.	Title	Writer(s)	Length
1.	"Spooky"	Mike Shapiro; Harry Middlebrooks Jr	2:43
2.	"Walk Like an Egyptian"	Liam Sternberg	2:42
3.	"Old Cape Cod"	Claire Rothrock; Milton Yakus; Allan Jeffrey	3:32
4.	"Soho Nights"	Stephanie O'Brien	4:29
5.	"I Can't Believe I'm Not A Millionaire"	Marcella Puppini	4:31
6.	"It Don't Mean a Thing"	Duke Ellington; Irving Mills	4:50
7.	"Could It Be Magic"	Barry Manilow; Adrienne Anderson	3:33
8.	"Jilted"	Puppini	5:37
9.	"Don't Sit Under the Apple Tree"	Lew Brown; Charles Tobias	2:51
10.	"Crazy in Love"	Beyoncé Knowles; Rich Harrison; Shawn Carter; Eugene Record	3:38
11.	"It's Not Over (Death or The Toy Piano)"	Kate Mullins	3:15
12.	"And She Sang"	Puppini	4:16
13.	"We Have All the Time in the World"	Hal David; John Barry	4:03

== Charts ==
Chart (2007–08)	Peak position
France (SNEP)	43
UK Albums (OCC)	73
US Jazz Albums (Billboard)	9
