= Charlotte (EP) =

2021 EP by Charlotte Lawrence

EP by Charlotte Lawrence
- Released: March 5, 2021
- Length: 22:12
- Label: Atlantic
- Producer: Andrew Watt; Charlie Puth; Happy Perez; Jason Evigan; Louis Bell; Louis Schoorl; Mag; Mike Busbee; Ryan Daly

Charlotte Lawrence chronology
Young (2018)	Charlotte (2021)	Somewhere (2025)

Singles from Charlotte
- 1. "Talk You Down" Released: January 8, 2021; 2. "You" Released: March 1, 2021

Charlotte is the second extended play by American singer-songwriter Charlotte Lawrence. It was released on March 5, 2021, via Atlantic Records. The album features two singles: "Talk You Down," released on January 8, 2021, as the lead single, and "You," released on March 1, 2021.

== Background ==
Charlotte Lawrence released her debut extended play Young in 2018 through Human Re Sources. She later signed with Creative Artists Agency (CAA), where she was represented by a team led by Christian Carino. Under producer Andrew Watt's Gold Tooth Records imprint at Atlantic Records, Lawrence was featured on Yungblud's single "Falling Skies", which appeared on the second season of the television show 13 Reasons Why, and collaborated with Kaskade on "Cold as Stone", which peaked at number 11 on the Billboard Hot 100. She completed the North American leg of her Navy Blue Tour, and her next single, "Joke's on You", was chosen as the opening track of the official soundtrack for the 2020 film Birds of Prey.

After publicly revealing her COVID-19 diagnosis in March to urge fans to self-isolate, the singer spent the remainder of lockdown productively, completing her album. Reflecting on the experience, she shared that quarantine allowed her to finish numerous unfinished songs and fully complete the album, joking that with everything done, it might be time to pick up new hobbies — "Maybe I'll become a rapper." Lawrence spent over two and a half years working on her self-titled EP, describing it as a reflection of her personal growth and experiences during that time. The seven-track project features production from notable figures including Busbee, Charlie Puth, Happy Perez, Jason Evigan, Louis Bell, Louis Schoorl, Mag, Ojivolta, Ryan Daly, and Andrew Watt. In a heartfelt message, Lawrence expressed deep gratitude to her collaborators, calling the EP "painfully special" and praising the creative bonds formed throughout its making. She paid a special tribute to the late producer Busbee, honoring both their friendship and the emotional resonance of their collaboration on the track "Rx."

On April 9, 2021, the singer released an acoustic, performance-focused EP, offering reinterpretations that contrast with her studio recordings.

== Release and promotion ==
Ahead of the EP's release, Lawrence shared several standalone singles, including "Joke's on You", "Slow Motion", and "The End". In 2018, she also gained wider attention through her feature on Yungblud's 13 Reasons Why soundtrack single "Falling Skies". Another single, "Navy Blue", was released prior to the EP and initially presumed to be part of the project, but was ultimately left off the final tracklist.

Following the release of "Navy Blue", which preceded the EP but was ultimately not included in its tracklist, Lawrence announced a tour scheduled to begin in November 2019. The tour followed a period of increased public activity, including her U.S. television debut on Jimmy Kimmel Live! on March 4.

=== Singles ===
"Talk You Down" was released on January 8, 2021, as the lead single from the EP. Reflecting on the track, Lawrence explained the importance of open communication during difficult times: "Everyone deals with their emotions in different ways... Talking with someone about how you feel is a perfect way to get through any emotional experience." The second single from the EP, "You", was released on March 1, 2021.

== Composition ==
=== Song ===
The song "Why Do You Love Me" reflects her engagement with dark pop, combining emotionally introspective lyrics with upbeat melodies.

== Track listing ==
Charlotte – Standard edition
No.	Title	Writer(s)	Producer(s)	Length
1.	"Talk You Down"	Ojivolta; Charlotte Lawrence; Andrew Watt; Julia Michaels; Michael Pollack	Watt; Ojivolta^{[a]}	2:36
2.	"You"	Lawrence; Watt	Watt	3:40
3.	"Sin X Secret"	Mag; Lawrence; Louis Schoorl; Caroline Pennell; Martin Hardie Coogan	Schoorl; Mag^{[a]}	3:13
4.	"Slow Motion"	Jason Evigan; Lawrence; Watt; Ali Tamposi	Watt; Evigan^{[a]}	3:03
5.	"Cowboys"	Happy Perez; Lawrence; Watt; Tamposi; Ryan Tedder	Watt; Perez^{[a]}	3:58
6.	"Rx"	Busbee; Lawrence; Ryan Daly; Jeremy Dussolliet; Max Cooke	Daly; Busbee^{[a]}	2:51
Total length:				22:12

Charlotte – Digital download edition
No.	Title	Writer(s)	Producer(s)	Length
7.	"Why Do You Love Me"	Tamposi; Louis Bell; Tedder; Alan Gordon; Andrew Wotman; Charlie Puth; Lawrence; Garry Bonner	Watt; Puth; Bell	2:51

=== Notes ===
- ^{^[a]} signifies co-producer.
