= La Grande Vie =

La Grande Vie may refer to:

- La Grande Vie (film), German-French-Italian 1960 co-production, directed by Julien Duvivier and starring Giulietta Masina
- La Grande Vie (novella), two 1986 juvenile literature works by French author J. M. G. Le Clézio, published by Gallimard Jeunesse
- Daily Grand, a Canadian lottery game known as Grande Vie in French-speaking markets

== See also ==
- High life (disambiguation)
- The High Life (disambiguation)
