= Jilted =

Jilted is the past tense of jilt.

Jilted may also refer to:

- Jilted (film), a 1987 film directed by Bill Bennett
- "Jilted" (song), a popular song with music by Dick Manning and lyrics by Robert Colby
- "Jilted", a song from The Puppini Sisters' album The Rise and Fall of Ruby Woo, 2007
- "Jilted Lovers & Broken Hearts", a song by Brandon Flowers, 2010
- Music for the Jilted Generation, an electronic album by The Prodigy, known colloquially as Jilted
