= In or Out (disambiguation) =

"In or Out" is an episode of Ugly Betty

In or Out may also refer to:

== Music ==
- "In or Out", a song by Ani DiFranco from Imperfectly
- "In or Out", a song by Jeanette from Undress to the Beat
- "In or Out", a song by Doug Locke
- "In or Out", a song by Elina Born
- "In or Out", a song by Erakah
- "In or Out", a song by Funkin Matt
- "In or Out", a song by Lito Camo
- "In or Out", a song by Matthew Mayfield
- "In or Out", a song by Sandara Park
- "In or Out", a song from the soundtrack Motherless Brooklyn
- "In or Out", a song from the musical The Devil Wears Prada

== Film and television ==
- "In or Out", a two-part episode of 60 Days In
- "In or Out?", an episode of Ball in the Family
- "In or Out", a two-part episode of Chemistry
- "In or Out", an episode of Chicken Girls
- "In or Out", an episode of Dimension 20
- "In or Out?", an episode of Earth to Luna!
- "In or Out", an episode of How to Make It in America
- "In or Out", an episode of Jamie Johnson
- "In or Out", an episode of Private Practice (TV series)
- The European Union: In or Out, a British television debate
- "Love Game: In or Out?", an episode of MTV Ex or Next

== Other uses ==
- In or Out, a novel and series by Claudia Gabel
- In or Out, a giclée by Alano Edzerza

== See also ==
- Are You In or Out?, an album by the Growlers
- "Are You In or Out?", a song from Aladdin and the King of Thieves
- Akatho Puratho (transl. In or Out), a film directed by Sudevan
- "In or Out of Africa", an episode of Naturally, Sadie
