= The Puppini Sisters =

English close harmony group

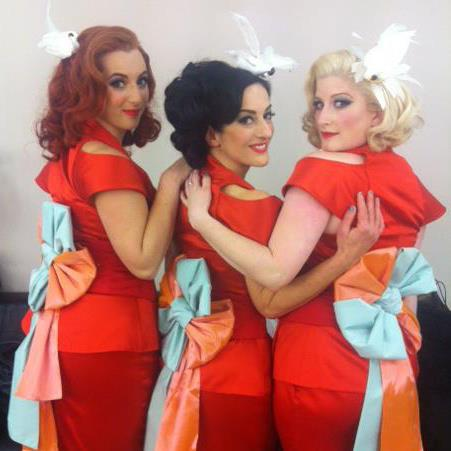
- The Puppini Sisters (Smith, Puppini and Mullins) backstage at The Graham Norton Show, Christmas 2012

Background information
- Origin: London, England
- Genres: A cappella; pop; jazz; close harmony; swing
- Years active: 2004–present
- Labels: UCJ (UK); Verve (US); Millionaire (UK and US)
- Members: Marcella Puppini (2004–present); Kate Mullins (2004–present); Rosanna Schura (2004, 2016, 2025–present)
- Past members: Emma Smith (2012–2024); Stephanie O'Brien (2004–12); Terrianne Passingham (2012)
- Website: thepuppinisisters.com

The Puppini Sisters are an English close harmony vocal trio composed of Italian-born singer Marcella Puppini and English singers Kate Mullins and Rosanna Schura. Although the three are not related, the name was chosen in tribute to the Andrews Sisters. They are known for providing guest vocals on Michael Bublé's cover of "Jingle Bells". Puppini first studied fashion design at Saint Martins School of Art, and later music at Trinity College of Music in London, where she met Mullins and original member Rosanna Schura, who was later replaced by Stephanie O'Brien. After eight years with the group, O'Brien was replaced by Emma Smith. The trio are backed by a three-piece band featuring Martin Kolarides on guitar, Henrik Jensen on double bass and Peter Ibbetson on drums. The group is associated with a burlesque revival.

== Career ==
The group was founded in 2004 by Marcella Puppini after she was inspired by the animated film The Triplets of Belleville (Les Triplettes de Belleville) (2003). In 2005, they were signed by UCJ (Universal Classics and Jazz). The Puppini Sisters' debut single, "Boogie Woogie Bugle Boy", was a cover of the hit single by The Andrews Sisters. The group's second album, The Rise and Fall of Ruby Woo, includes original compositions by Puppini, Stephanie O'Brien and Kate Mullins. The trio's albums often include contemporary songs reimagined in the Andrews Sisters style (for example, The Bangles' "Walk Like an Egyptian" on their Ruby Woo album).

The Puppini Sisters' television appearances include This Morning, Loose Women, The Alan Titchmarsh Show, Big Brother's Little Brother, Hell's Kitchen, CBeebies' Space Pirates, The View (on ABC), and 2011's A Michael Bublé Christmas on NBC and Graham Norton with Bublé in 2012. The group appeared in the 2009 Jonathan Creek New Year's special The Grinning Man, performing their 2007 single "Spooky" and has been featured on the soundtracks for the US TV series Grey's Anatomy and Chuck. In 2015 the Sisters appeared on BBC1's Strictly Come Dancing.

The group performed at Glastonbury Festival 2009 on 27 June as well as performing at Goodwood Vintage Festival on 15 August.

On 27 June 2012, O'Brien announced via the group's Facebook page that she was leaving the group. It was later revealed that Terrianne Passingham would replace O'Brien. However, Passingham also left the group and shortly thereafter Emma Smith took her place. The singer made her debut with The Puppini Sisters on The Graham Norton Show in November 2012.

The trio started a PledgeMusic campaign to crowdfund their new album (along with an optional bonus edition of remixes) with the help of fans. The album was finalised before Christmas 2015 and it was released in March 2016. (Those who donated money to the creation of the album were able to receive the album digitally on 25 February and The Deluxe remix edition on 7 June.)

From March 2016, the trio embarked on a tour to promote the album across many areas in the country and internationally finishing off in London at O2 Islington Academy. For four dates of the tour, Smith was absent so original member Rosanna Schura filled in for those dates.

In 2019, The trio announced a collaboration with the Pasadena Roof Orchestra on a project titled Dance, Dance, Dance, conceived as a tribute to the tradition of dance bands and popular dance styles including the lindy hop and charleston. The project was supported by a crowdfunding campaign and premiered at London’s Southbank Centre before being recorded later that year. The album was released in 2020.

During the COVID-19 pandemic, the group performed two livestreamed concerts from The Premises Studios: Unlocked in September 2020 and Christmas at Home in December 2020. Recordings of both performances were subsequently made available on CD.

In 2021, the trio launched a further crowdfunding campaign to support the production of a Christmas EP. The resulting release, Dear Santa, I Can Explain, comprised four original seasonal tracks.

In September 2025, the group announced that they had begun recording their seventh studio album to mark the 20th anniversary of the group’s formation. It was further revealed that Emma Smith would not appear on the record due to other commitments, and that Rosanna Schura, an original member of the trio, would rejoin Marcella Puppini and Kate Mullins for the album. This marked Schura’s first recording with the group after a 20-year absence. The album was released in spring 2026.

== Influences ==
According to Marcella Puppini, the group sings about modern and risqué subjects in a quaintly old-fashioned way. This comes from their interest in 1940s songs such as "Hold Tight (Want Some Seafood Mama)" that have sexual undertones despite their overtly innocent lyrics.

== Awards ==
The Puppini Sisters won a Gold Disc for international sales of their first CD, Betcha Bottom Dollar, in 2007.

The Puppini Sisters website won the 2008 Cream of Yorkshire awards "Gold Award" for best website. The digital advertising agency twentysix won the top award the "overall Grand Prix award" for its design of a website for Universal Music showcasing the group.

== Discography ==
=== Albums ===
- Betcha Bottom Dollar (31 July 2006 UK; 1 May 2007 US; March 2008 France) – according to the official website the album reached number two on the US jazz charts and number nine on the US new artist chart
- The Rise and Fall of Ruby Woo (1 October 2007 UK; February 2008 US; January 2009 France) – featuring classic covers, 1940s-style reworkings of contemporary music, and a selection of original compositions. According to Billboard's official website, the album peaked at number 5 in the US jazz charts in 2008.
- Christmas with The Puppini Sisters (5 October 2010 US) – containing reworkings of classic Christmas songs (Verve Records)
- Hollywood (Autumn 2011 France; 26 December 2011 UK) – Hollywood-musical-themed tracks and one original song (Universal)
- The Best of The Puppini Sisters (18 February 2015) – Compilation (Rambling Records)
- The High Life (4 March 2016) – Crowdfunded album. Bonus Deluxe Remix edition released on 21 October 2016 (Millionaire Records)
- Dance, Dance, Dance (4 September 2020) - An entire album inspired by popular ballroom, Latin and swing dances featuring the Pasadena Roof Orchestra
- The Birthday Party (27th March 2026) - An album to celebrate over 20 years since formation and 20 years since the release of their first album. Consists of covers, originals and Jazz standards.

=== Compilations ===
- "Could It Be Magic" appears on Magicians OST (2007)
- "Crazy in Love" on Swing Style – Swing Beats for Dancing Feets compiled and mixed by Gulbahar Kultur, Lola's World (2008), 100 Hits – Voices (2009), Radio Modern – The ABC of Swing, Bop'n'Roll (2010)
- "In the Mood" appears on Actrices OST (2008)
- "It Don't Mean a Thing (If It Ain't Got That Swing)" appears on Jazzism 1 from Jazzism Magazine (2008)
- "I Will Survive" appears on Tom Middleton Presents Crazy Covers 2 (2007), Bolero Fashion Sound compiled by Olivier Rohrbach (2007), Jazziz 8: Women compilation by Jazziz Magazine (2007), You're Beautiful – 40 Inspiring Songs (2007), Smile Style 2 compilation by DJ Weritos Lounge (2009), Intelligent Music Favorites Vol 7 (2009), Peppermint Candy (2011)
- "Jilted" appears on Back to Soul – New Soul Queens and Legendary Divas (2008)
- "Jingle Bells" appears on A Classic Christmas (2006), Now That's What I Call Xmas (2006), Now This Is Christmas 2008 (2008), Wonderland (2008), Now That's What I Call Christmas! 3 (2009), Christmas with the Stars (2010), Merry Christmas Everybody (2010), Now That's What I Call Xmas (2010)
- "Libertango" appears on Lost Vagueness OST (2007)
- "Mele Kalikimaka" appears on Christmas Tales 2010 by Raar FM (2010)
- "Mr. Sandman" appears on The Jazz Album 2006 (2006)
- "Panic" appears on Jazz for Dinner (2006), Party Jazz (2010)
- "Side by Side" and "Playmates" appears on Kit Kittredge: An American Girl OST (2008)
- "Spooky" appears on 100 Hits – Voices (2009)
- "Sway" appears on The Jazz Album 2006 (2006), 100 Hits – Voices (2009), TSF Jazz 1999–2009 10 Ans (2009)
- "Tu Vuo Fa L'Americano" appears on The Very Best of Latin Jazz (2007), New York New York (2008)
- "We Have All the Time in the World" appears on You Raise Me Up 2008 (2008)

=== Singles ===
- "Boogie Woogie Bugle Boy (From Company B)" (2006)
- "Jingle Bells/Silent Night (Little Match Seller)" (December 2006) iTunes-only release
- "Spooky" (2007)
- "Crazy in Love" (2007)
- "Jilted" (2008)
- "Apart of Me" with The Real Tuesday Weld (2008)
- "Diamonds Are a Girl's Best Friend" (2011)
- "Is This The High Life?" (2016)
- "I Wanna Dance With Somebody" featuring the Pasadena Roof Orchestra (2020)
- "Groove Is in the Heart" featuring the Pasadena Roof Orchestra (2020)
- "Sing Sing Sing" featuring the Pasadena Roof Orchestra (2020)

=== Videos ===
- "Boogie Woogie Bugle Boy" (2006)
- "Spooky" (2007)
- "Apart of Me" with The Real Tuesday Weld directed by Alex de Campi (2007)
- "Jilted" directed by Alex de Campi (2008)
- "(I Can't Believe I'm Not a) Millionaire" directed by Alex de Campi (2008)
- "Diamonds Are a Girl's Best Friend" directed by Alex de Campi (2011)
- "Work It" directed by Jacopo Dessì & Matteo Jhonny Capizzi (2016)
- "I Wanna Dance with Somebody" Animated by Animind Studios (2020)

== Collaborations ==
Christmas 2011 saw the release of "Jingle Bells" recorded with Michael Bublé for his Christmas album. They also recorded "Frosty the Snowman" with Bublé on the same album, as a bonus track on the deluxe edition.

The group recorded a close harmony version of the song "Apart of Me", by Stephen Coates of The Real Tuesday Weld, and acted in the video for the song, playing "a corpse, murdering waitresses, worms and chickens". Two versions of the song exist, one being that which was used for the video and the other is a track on The Real Tuesday Weld's 2008 album The London Book of the Dead.

The group used period costumes designed by Vivienne Westwood in their video for "Jilted", an original song written by Marcella Puppini (not to be confused with the 1954 Theresa Brewer country number). Jesse Quin, bassist of the British band Keane, appears in the video as extra.

In November 2012, the Sisters featured on the album Electro Swing V by Bart & Baker collaborating with The Real Tuesday Weld on the song "Last Tango in Clerkenwell".

The group recorded with Bublé again on his 2013 album To Be Loved; they performed back-up on the track "Nevertheless (I'm in Love with You)".

In 2013, the trio sang "Welcome to My Hell" with Raphael Gualazzi in his Happy Mistake album.

In 2017, the group recorded with Seal on his tenth studio album, Standards.

In late 2018, the trio sang with The Real Tuesday Weld on their new song, "Don't Get High No More", and the video was premiered on YouTube on 6 January 2019.

In 2019, the trio backed up Bing Crosby's and the Andrews Sisters’ vocals on two songs on the album Bing at Christmas, "Jingle Bells" and "The Twelve Days of Christmas," which also featured instrumental backing from the London Symphony Orchestra.

== Live reviews ==
- Verrico, Lisa (5 October 2007). "The Puppini Sisters". Music. The Times. Archived from the original on 17 May 2011. (login required)
- Verrico, Lisa (5 October 2007). "The Puppini Sisters". Music. The Times. Archived from the original on 17 May 2011. (login required)
- Heawood, S (29 September 2007). "Meet the sisters of swing". Music. The Times. Archived from the original on 17 May 2011. (login required)
- Hasted, N (6 January 2009). "The Puppini Sisters, Queen Elizabeth Hall, London". Music. The Independent.
- Hasted, N (6 January 2009). "The Puppini Sisters, Queen Elizabeth Hall, London". Music. The Independent.
- Davis, Clive (15 December 2015). "The Puppini Sisters at Ronnie Scott's, W1". Music. The Times. Archived from the original on 16 December 2015.
- Yardley, Erminia (13 December 2015). "The Puppini Sisters, Ronnie Scott's, London". Music. Kind of Jazz.
- Wright, Matthew (11 December 2015). "The Puppini Sisters, Ronnie Scott's". Music. The Arts Desk.
- Roberts, Katie (11 December 2015). "Review: The Puppini Sisters, The Spiegeltent". Music. Bristol 24/7.
- Tempia, Simone (7 July 2011). "Look back, go ahead". Magazine. Vogue Italia N° 731, p. 76.
- de Campi, Alex (18 January 2008). "The Puppini Sisters in Vivienne Westwood (1 of 3)". Documentary. Glamour Magazine UK. Archived from the original on 19 December 2021.
- Fahy, Natalie (11 December 2014). "Review: The Puppini Sisters, Glee Club". Music. Nottingham Post. Archived from the original on 11 May 2015.
- Hawkins, Si (21 December 2011). "The Puppini Sisters - Live at Union Chapel, London". Music. Clash Music.
- Wood, Michael (2 December 2014). "The Puppini Sisters: 'We count Michael Bublé and Prince Charles as fans'". Music. Birmingham Post.
- Abbit, Beth (18 December 2014). "Review: The Puppini Sisters @ Royal Northern College of Music". Music. Manchester Evening News.
- "Gig review: The Puppini Sisters – Garrick Theatre". Music. Stokie Boy Blog. 14 December 2014.
- Lucchesi Palli, Ludovico (3 July 2014). "The Puppini Sisters – Stadstaal, Vienna". Music. Music Theatre Review.
- "Puppini Sisters at The Shepherds Bush Empire - Fans Review". Music. Music Theatre Review. 26 June 2012. Archived from the original on 19 December 2021.

== Band members ==
Timeline
