= You're Shining =

2004 single by Styles & Breeze

Single by Styles & Breeze

from the album Skydivin'
- Released: 2004
- Recorded: 2002–2004
- Length: 2:36
- Label: All Around the World
- Songwriters: Styles & Breeze

Darren Styles singles chronology
"Let Me Fly" (2002)	"You're Shining" (2004)	"Heartbeatz" (2003)

Mark Breeze singles chronology
"You're Shining" (2002)	"Heartbeatz" (2003)

Music video
- "You're Shining" on YouTube

"You're Shining" is a 2004 song by DJ duo Styles & Breeze. It reached the top 20 in Finland and the United Kingdom. It features vocals by Lisa Abbott.

== Chart performance ==
In Finland, "You're Shining" debuted and peaked at number 19; it only spent one week in the top 20. On the Irish Singles Chart, it debuted and peaked at number 46, also spending a sole week in the top 50. On the UK Singles Chart, it peaked at number 19. The next week it dropped nine places to number 28, and the following week it dropped another nine places to number 37. On its final week in the chart, it dropped 21 places to number 58.

== Music video ==
The video has a girl up in space singing whilst the sun shines bright, then it goes to a club where she is singing the song, Styles & Breeze are DJs in the club and the audience is raving to the song. The club in question is the sanctuary Milton Keynes.

== Remixes ==
1. "You're Shining" (Radio Edit)
2. "You're Shining" (Dark Mix)
3. "You're Shining" (Extended Mix)
4. "You're Shining" (Hardcore Mix)
5. "You're Shining" (KB Project Remix)
6. "You're Shining" (Scott Brown Remix)
7. "You're Shining" (Rezonance Q Remix)
8. "You're Shining" (Audiolush Remix)
9. "You're Shining" (Friday Night Posse Remix)
10. "You're Shining" (Hixxy Remix)
11. "You're Shining" (Kenny Hayes Vocal Mix)
12. "You're Shining" (Styles & Breeze Remix)
13. "You're Shining" (Breeze & Styles Remix)
14. "You're Shining" (Squad-E Remix)
15. "You're Shining" (Petruccio & Modulate Remix)

== Charts ==
Chart (2004)	Peak position
Finland (Suomen virallinen lista)	19
Ireland (IRMA)	46
Scottish Singles Sales (Official Charts)	14
UK Singles (Official Charts)	19
UK Dance (Official Charts)	5
