= God Must Be Doing Cocaine =

2019 single by Charlotte Lawrence

Single by Charlotte Lawrence
- Released: November 15, 2019
- Length: 3:14
- Label: Atlantic; Gold Tooth
- Songwriters: Charlotte Lawrence; John Ryan; Julian Bunetta
- Producers: John Ryan; Julian Bunetta

Charlotte Lawrence singles chronology
"Navy Blue" (2019)	"God Must Be Doing Cocaine" (2019)	"Joke's on You" (2020)

Visualizer
- "God Must Be Doing Cocaine" on YouTube

"God Must Be Doing Cocaine" is a song by American singer-songwriter Charlotte Lawrence. It was released on November 15, 2019, through Atlantic and Gold Tooth Records.

== Release ==
Following the release of the single "Navy Blue", Lawrence unveiled "God Must Be Doing Cocaine" through Atlantic and Gold Tooth Records in late 2019. Lawrence co-wrote the track along with John Ryan and Julian Bunetta, who also produced the song.

== Composition and reception ==
In "God Must Be Doing Cocaine", Lawrence explores themes of emotional emptiness and her love with her family. Clash noted that it reveals a "deeply mature" side of the artist, with her emotions laid bare. The Line of Best Fit described the song as a restrained and haunting ballad that "shines a spotlight on Lawrence's stellar vocal", drawing inspiration from artists such as Mazzy Star, Bon Iver, and Joni Mitchell.

== Personnel ==
Credits were adapted from AllMusic.

- Charlotte Lawrence – composer, lead vocals
- Jeff Gunnell – engineer
- John Ryan – composer, producer
- Julian Bunetta – composer, producer
- Manny Marroquin – mixing
- Nathan Dantzler – mastering
