= Diamonds (Megan Thee Stallion and Normani song) =

2020 single by Megan Thee Stallion and Normani

Single by Megan Thee Stallion and Normani

from the album Birds of Prey: The Album
- Released: January 10, 2020
- Recorded: 2019
- Genre: Pop rap
- Length: 3:19
- Label: Atlantic
- Songwriters: Edgar Machuca; Jule Styne; Kameron Glasper; Leo Robin; Louis Bell; Madison Love; Megan Pete; Mike Arrow; Normani Kordei; Santeri Kauppinen; Tayla Parx
- Producers: Louis Bell; MD$; Mike Arrow; Tayla Parx; Edgar Machuca

Megan Thee Stallion singles chronology
| "Ride or Die" (2019) | "Diamonds" (2020) | "B.I.T.C.H." (2020) |

Normani singles chronology
| "Motivation" (2019) | "Diamonds" (2020) | "Wild Side" (2021) |

Birds of Prey singles chronology
| "Diamonds" (2020) | "Joke's on You" (2020) |

Music video
- "Diamonds" on YouTube

"Diamonds" is a song by American rapper Megan Thee Stallion and American singer Normani. It was released on January 10, 2020, by Atlantic, as the lead single from the soundtrack to the film Birds of Prey. The song samples "Diamonds Are a Girl's Best Friend" by Marilyn Monroe, making this the first song to directly sample the jazz classic according to the music blog Idolator.

== Background and composition ==
The collaboration was announced in December 2019. The single art was unveiled and the song was released on January 10, 2020. "Diamonds" was written by Edgar Machuca, Jule Styne, Kameron Glasper, Leo Robin, Louis Bell, Madison Love, Megan Thee Stallion, Mike Arrow, Normani, Santeri Kauppinen, and Tayla Parx; it was produced by Bell and MD$. "Diamonds" is a pop and hip hop song with lyrics of female empowerment and moving on from a relationship.

== Critical reception ==
Harper's Bazaar's Erica Gonzales wrote that "the high-energy track is a perfect fit for Megan's razor-sharp flow, while Normani gracefully interpolates Marilyn Monroe's "Diamonds Are a Girl's Best Friend" in the melody". Billboard called it "a gem of a song". Madeline Roth of MTV described the song as "a total flex anthem". Time named it one of the five best songs of the week. XXL magazine also named it one of the best new tracks of the week.

== Music video ==
A music video for the song was released on January 10, 2020.

The video sees the artists in a "dark" amusement house spliced with scenes of the film, including a sequence of Harley Quinn which was inspired by Marilyn Monroe's version of "Diamonds Are a Girl's Best Friend" from the 1953 film Gentlemen Prefer Blondes.

== Credits and personnel ==
Credits adapted from Tidal.

- Megan Thee Stallion – vocals, songwriter
- Normani Kordei Hamilton – vocals, songwriter
- Marilyn Monroe – background vocals
- Edgar Machuca – songwriter
- Jule Styne – songwriter
- Kameron Glasper – songwriter
- Leo Robin – songwriter
- Madison Love – songwriter
- Mike Arrow – songwriter
- Santeri Kauppinen – songwriter
- Tayla Parx – songwriter
- Louis Bell – songwriter, producer
- MD$ – producer
- Jaime P. Velez – engineering, vocal production
- Michele Mancini – mastering
- Manny Marroquin – mixing

== Charts ==
| Chart (2020) | Peak position |
|---|---|
| New Zealand Hot Singles (RMNZ) | 23 |
| US Bubbling Under Hot 100 (Billboard) | 16 |
| US Digital Songs (Billboard) | 31 |
| US R&B/Hip-Hop Digital Song Sales (Billboard) | 12 |
| US Rhythmic Airplay (Billboard) | 27 |

== Release history ==
| Region | Date | Format | Label | Ref. |
|---|---|---|---|---|
| Various | January 10, 2020 | Digital download, streaming | Atlantic | |
