= Motherless Brooklyn (soundtrack) =

2019 soundtrack albums

The soundtrack to the 2019 film Motherless Brooklyn directed by Edward Norton consists of two musical projects: Motherless Brooklyn (Original Motion Picture Soundtrack), featuring jazz compositions, and Motherless Brooklyn (Original Motion Picture Score), featuring a score by Daniel Pemberton. Both albums were released by WaterTower Music on October 25, 2019, a week prior to the film's release. An original song featured on the first album, "Daily Battles", performed by Thom Yorke and Flea, released as a single on August 21.

== Development ==
"I was intimidated but intrigued by Ed [Edward Norton]'s idea of trying to write a song that felt timeless, from a different era [...] [Like] a lost musical standard that could fall seamlessly into the hands of a small, Kind of Blue Miles Davis jazz ensemble, but at the same time still be me, and still be modern."

— Thom Yorke

Norton sent the film's script to Radiohead singer-songwriter and multi-instrumentalist Thom Yorke on email and asked him to write a song for the film. Two weeks later, he sent him the finished song "Daily Battles" with his Atoms for Peace bandmate Flea performing bass and horns. The song was then arranged by jazz musician Wynton Marsalis as a 1950s ballad with pianist Isaiah J. Thompson, bassist Russell Hall, saxophonist Jerry Weldon and drummer Joe Farnsworth. Marsalis was further asked to perform key horns on particular themes reflecting the characters; he read the score sheets and said "This is just great; you have to let us play over all of it."

After completing the score Spider-Man: Into the Spider-Verse (2018), Pemberton was invited by Norton for a drink at the Chiltern Firehouse in London. During their meeting, Norton referenced Vangelis' score for Chariots of Fire (1981) as his and Pemberton's favorite because of its simple classical piano theme underlined at the synthesizers to curate a neo-noir fusion score; Pemberton bought the Yamaha CS-80 synthesizer—which Vangelis used for scoring Chariots of Fire—in his first salary. Unlike Chariots of Fire, Norton did not want a synthesized score but instead "something that viewed the subject matter from a different angle just like in the same way that Chariots of Fire viewed a period English drama from a different angle", they discussed on how they could view Motherless Brooklyn apart from a traditional noir score.

Norton described the score as "half Miles Davis half Radiohead"; he wanted a "big, lyrical, thematic jazz score" but also want a dissonance. Pemberton thought of adapting the sounds from the ancient period and layer it with modern instrumental approach with limited musical palette. The score consisted of trumpet, saxophone, double bass, piano, drums, percussions and strings layered with ambient synthesizers. Despite being a complex score, Pemberton wrote the film's music in less than four weeks, composed them within two weeks and recorded it in three days at the Abbey Road Studios in London.

== Release ==
Yorke's original song "Daily Battles" along with Marsalis' re-arranged jazz ballad version of the song were released for digital download on August 21, 2019 and as a vinyl single on October 4. The soundtrack and Pemberton's score were released through WaterTower Music on October 25, a week ahead of the film's release.

== Reception ==
A reviewer based at Film Music Central wrote "Motherless Brooklyn has an interesting soundtrack for sure; Daniel Pemberton left his unique mark on every piece." Another critic from The Film Scorer wrote " The score fills the slower moments with life and, like Jerry Goldsmith did in Chinatown, serves to remind the viewer that no matter how optimistic things may seem, there's always something waiting to crush that optimism." Luke Hicks of Film School Rejects described it as "a smoky [...] jazz score that will undoubtedly outlive the film". Wendy Ide of The Guardian wrote "the score, by Daniel Pemberton, is a brassy dive bar grind, all skittish drums and slutty brass."

A. O. Scott of The New York Times wrote "The musical score, with its Elmer Bernstein echoes, is by Daniel Pemberton, and is supplemented by Wynton Marsalis's fresh, precise interpretations of period-appropriate jazz classics." Clarisse Loughrey of The Independent described the film's score as "lush and authentic", while Rolling Stone critic Peter Travers called it as "evocative". Calling it as one of the best music scores of the year, Pete Hammond of Deadline Hollywood stated "smoky and jazzy riffs that are as much a character in the piece as any of the sensational cast Norton has assembled here".

Record producer-composer Quincy Jones, who watched the film at a special screening complemented Pemberton's score, adding that he "can't get my head around the music in that film".

== Track listing ==
Motherless Brooklyn (Original Motion Picture Soundtrack)

Soundtrack album by various artists
- Released: October 25, 2019
- Genre: Jazz
- Length: 40:03
- Label: WaterTower Music

Singles from Motherless Brooklyn (Original Motion Picture Soundtrack)
- 1. "Daily Battles" Released: August 21, 2019

=== Motherless Brooklyn (Original Motion Picture Soundtrack) ===
No.	Title	Artist(s)	Length
1.	"Woman In Blue"	Wynton Marsalis; Willie Jones III; Philip Norris; Isaiah J. Thompson; Ted Nash; Daniel Pemberton	6:03
2.	"Daily Battles"	Thom Yorke; Flea	2:53
3.	"Relaxing With Lee"	Dizzy Gillespie; Charlie Parker; Thelonious Monk	2:48
4.	"Round About Midnight"	Babs Gonzales	3:38
5.	"Blues Walk"	Marsalis; Joe Farnsworth; Russell Hall; J. Thompson; Jerry Weldon	2:56
6.	"Daily Battles"	Marsalis; Farnsworth; Hall; J. Thompson; Weldon	3:24
7.	"Jump Monk"	Marsalis; Farnsworth; Hall; J. Thompson; Weldon	4:01
8.	"Delilah"	Marsalis; Farnsworth; Hall; J. Thompson; Weldon	5:05
9.	"On a Misty Night"	Marsalis; Farnsworth; Hall; J. Thompson; Weldon	5:35
10.	"Motherless Brooklyn Theme"	Marsalis; Jones III; Norris; J. Thompson; Nash; Pemberton	3:40
Total length:			40:03

Motherless Brooklyn (Original Motion Picture Score)

Film score by Daniel Pemberton
- Released: October 25, 2019
- Genre: Film score
- Length: 65:57
- Label: WaterTower Music
- Producer: Daniel Pemberton

Daniel Pemberton chronology
Yesterday (2019)	Motherless Brooklyn (2019)	Birds of Prey (2020)

=== Motherless Brooklyn (Original Motion Picture Score) ===
No.	Title	Artist(s)	Length
1.	"Tyrannous"		3:11
2.	"Sharp on the Line"		3:45
3.	"Fire It Up"		4:01
4.	"Emergency Room"		2:49
5.	"Motherless Home"		1:13
6.	"No Wisdom"		4:00
7.	"The Woman in the Photo"		1:11
8.	"Plaza Speech"		4:07
9.	"Borough Authority"		2:24
10.	"Woman In Blue"		3:23
11.	"Brother"		3:31
12.	"Red Rooster"		1:29
13.	"Motherless Brooklyn"		4:41
14.	"Something Not Telling"		2:53
15.	"In or Out"		4:36
16.	"Penn Station"		3:19
17.	"Across Harlem"		5:50
18.	"Close, The Right Information"		2:05
19.	"Motherless County"		1:26
20.	"Woman In Blue" (end credits)	Marsalis; Jones III; Norris; J. Thompson; Nash	6:03
Total length:			65:57

== Chart performance ==
Chart (2020)	Peak position
UK Soundtrack Albums (OCC)	49

== Accolades ==
Accolades received by Motherless Brooklyn (film)
Award	Date of ceremony	Category	Recipient(s)	Result	Ref.
Golden Globe Awards	January 5, 2020	Best Original Score	Daniel Pemberton	Nominated	
Hollywood Music in Media Awards	November 20, 2019	Best Original Score – Feature Film	Daniel Pemberton	Nominated	
Hollywood Music in Media Awards	November 20, 2019	Best Original Song – Feature Film	"Daily Battles" by Thom Yorke and Flea	Nominated	
International Film Music Critics Association	February 20, 2020	Best Original Score for a Drama Film	Daniel Pemberton	Nominated	
London Film Critics' Circle	January 30, 2020	Technical Achievement of the Year	Daniel Pemberton (music)	Nominated	
