= Christina Aguilera at Voltaire =

Concert residency by Christina Aguilera

- Residency by Christina Aguilera
- Promotional poster for the residency
- Location: Paradise, Nevada, U.S.
- Venue: Voltaire at The Venetian Las Vegas
- Start date: December 30, 2023
- End date: August 31, 2024
- Legs: 2
- No. of shows: 20

Christina Aguilera concert chronology
- EU / UK Summer Series (2022); Christina Aguilera at Voltaire (2023–2024)

Christina Aguilera at Voltaire was the second concert residency by American singer-songwriter Christina Aguilera. It was produced by Live Nation, and ran at Voltaire at The Venetian Las Vegas from December 30, 2023, to August 31, 2024.

== Background ==
In January 2019, Aguilera appeared on The Ellen DeGeneres Show to announce her first residency concert, describing it as "a multisensory escape to a world of magic and total freedom". She headlined Christina Aguilera: The Xperience at the Zappos Theater at Planet Hollywood Las Vegas, which ran from May 2019 to March 2020 in four legs; its fifth leg was cancelled due to the COVID-19 pandemic in September 2020. It earned over $10.2 million according to Pollstar. She later embarked on The X Tour (2019) and EU / UK Summer Series (2023), with the latter promoting her second Spanish record, Aguilera.

On October 10, 2023, Aguilera announced her second residency concert in a statement to Billboard. Described as "a seductively intimate show", it was also reported to take place at Voltaire at The Venetian Las Vegas. Later that month, she appeared on Jimmy Kimmel Live! talk show to promote the new residency; during the interview, she also stated, "It's such a creative experience for me, unlike anything I've ever done because it's such a very special, exclusive [show], like only 1,000 seats per night and I'm not on until midnight".

== Concept ==
According to Aguilera, the concept of the residency was "bringing a show that fuses music, sophistication and art in ways [she] never performed before". In an interview with Vogue, she stated that she was "drawn to doing the show from the ground up [...] building it around this moody, intricate, intimate space", while she revealed inspirations from the belle de nuit flower and diamonds to produce the show themes. Aguilera also cited Marilyn Monroe's classic musical number "Diamonds Are a Girl's Best Friend" from the film Gentlemen Prefer Blondes (1953) as an alter ego, defining the message as "living out [the] fantasies on stage and deserving nothing but the best". Aguilera's outfits in the show were designed by fashion house Mugler, as well custom pieces designed by Yogie Pratama and Asher Levine.

== Critical response ==
Tomás Mier from Rolling Stone described the show as "sexier, Burlesqueier, and more intimate", while pointing out "Aguilera's ever-so-stunning vocals and Vegas show(wo)manship". Mier also highlighted dancers, live sax and trumpet players, as well as her transition from a shimmering silver minidress into a dominatrix-style outfit to perform "You Don't Own Me" from atop a bed. Las Vegas Review-Journal author John Katsilometes said that "Aguilera's superb voice alone sets her apart", citing her "soaring performance" during "Beautiful" as one of the night's highlights alongside the dance troupe and full backing band. Em Jurbala of Las Vegas Magazine praised the residency, writing: "Almost as stunning as Aguilera's vocals and personality, the wardrobe for this show is chic, dynamic and fashionable".

== Commercial performance ==
Aguilera's residency was met with an overwhelming demand for tickets. In an interview with Las Vegas Review-Journal, Voltaire's creator Michael Gruber stated, "[Her] shows were oversold [...] With the amount of interest and reviews, demand has increased substantially". On March 6, 2024, Aguilera added an additional 300 tickets for each date of the second leg of the residency due to high demand. Journalist John Katsilometes, for the Las Vegas Review Journal, called it a "hit residency", and in August 2024, Glamour noted that it was "successful". According to Ringier Axel Springer, almost every Aguilera's show at Voltaire was sold out.

== Set list ==
The set list is from the December 30, 2023 concert:

1. "Not Myself Tonight"
2. "Your Body"
3. "Diamonds Are Forever"
4. "Glam"
5. "Vanity"
6. "Genie in a Bottle"
7. "You Don't Own Me"
8. "Dirrty"
9. "Guy What Takes His Time"
10. "Ain't No Other Man"
11. "Welcome to Burlesque"
12. "Lady Marmalade"
13. "Fighter"
14. "Beautiful"
15. "Diamonds Are a Girl's Best Friend"

== Shows ==
Date	Attendance	Revenue
Leg 1
December 30, 2023	—	—
December 31, 2023	—	—
February 2, 2024	—	—
February 3, 2024	—	—
February 9, 2024	—	—
February 10, 2024	—	—
March 1, 2024	—	—
March 2, 2024	—	—
Leg 2
April 12, 2024 (Note: The show on April 12, 2024 was originally scheduled for January 5, but was postponed due to illness.)	—	—
April 13, 2024 (Note: The show on April 13, 2024 was originally scheduled for January 6, but was postponed due to illness.)	—	—
April 19, 2024	—	—
April 20, 2024	—	—
May 31, 2024	—	—
June 1, 2024	—	—
June 7, 2024	—	—
June 8, 2024	—	—
August 2, 2024	—	—
August 3, 2024	—	—
August 30, 2024	—	—
August 31, 2024	—	—
