= Darren Styles discography =

Discography

- Studio albums: 3
- Extended plays: 3
- Compilation albums: 2
- Music videos: 13

This is the discography page for Darren Styles. It also includes the discography of his groups DJ Force & The Evolution, Force & Styles and Styles & Breeze. It also includes the peak chart performance of each album or single where applicable.

== Albums ==
=== Studio albums ===
Year	Title	Charts			Certifications
Year	Title	UK	UK Dance	IRE	Certifications
1996	All over the UK (Force & Styles): Released: 26 August 1996; Label: United Dance	103	—	—	
2008	Skydivin': Released: 16 June 2008; Label: All Around the World, Universal Music TV	4	1	41	BPI: Gold
2010	Feel the Pressure: Released: 23 August 2010; Label: All Around the World, Universal Music TV	23	1	—	
"—" denotes an album that did not chart or was not released.

=== Compilation albums ===
- Simply Electric (1998) (DJ Force & The Evolution / Force & Styles)
- Heart of Gold (2000) (Force & Styles)

=== Extended plays ===
- Jelly Baby 1 (2002)
- Hixxy & Styles (2006)
- Darren Styles (2006)
- Darren Styles & Gammer (2014)

=== DJ mix albums ===
- Inside the Mind of Force & Styles (1997)
- Moondance: The Album (1997)
- The Sound of Happycore '97 Volume 2 (1997)
- United Dance Volume 6 (1997)
- Explosion '97 (1997)
- Masters @ Work Volume II (1998)
- The Best of United Dance (1998)
- Dance Energy (1998)
- Hardcore Heaven: The Battle of Britain (1999)
- Masters of Hardcore (2002)
- Hardcore Heaven 2: Reloaded (2003)
- Hardcore Til I Die (2003)
- Original Hardcore 2: The Battle (2003)
- Battle of the DJ's: Match 2 (2004)
- Original Hardcore: The Nu Breed (2004)
- Bonkers 12 - The Dirty Dozen (2004)
- Ultimate NRG & Hardcore, Vol. 2 (2005)
- Clubland X-Treme Hardcore (2005)
- Clubland X-Treme Hardcore 2 (2006)
- Clubland X-Treme Hardcore 3 (2006)
- Clubland X-Treme Hardcore 4 (2007)
- Clubland X-Treme Hardcore 5 (2008)
- Clubland X-Treme Hardcore 6 (2009)
- Clubland X-Treme Hardcore 7 (2010)
- Clubland X-Treme Hardcore 8 (2012)
- Clubland X-Treme Hardcore 9 (2013)

== Singles ==
=== Charted singles ===
Year	Song	Charts					Certifications
Year	Song	UK	UK Dance	CZE	IRE	FIN	Certifications
1997	"Paradise & Dreams" (Force & Styles featuring Junior)	87	—	—	—	—	
1998	"Heart of Gold '98" (Force & Styles featuring Kelly Llorenna)	55	9	—	—	—	
2002	"Black Magic"	110	—	—	—	—	
2003	"Let Me Fly" (Styles & Breeze)	59	10	—	—	—	
2003	"Chemical Love" (Styles & Breeze)	92	—	—	—	—	
2004	"You're Shining" (Styles & Breeze)	19	5	—	46	19	
2005	"Rushins" / "The Theme" (with Hixxy)	143	—	—	—	—	
2005	"Heartbeatz" (Styles & Breeze)	16	1	—	38	16	
2005	"Cutting Deep" / "Skydivin'"	147	—	—	—	—	
2006	"Save Me"	70	11	—	—	—	BPI: Silver
2007	"Sure Feels Good" (vs. Ultrabeat)	52	6	—	—	—	
2008	"Right by Your Side" (vs. N-Force)	77	8	—	—	—	
2008	"Discolights" (vs. Ultrabeat)	23	2	1	28	—	
"—" denotes a recording that did not chart or was not released.

==== DJ Force & The Evolution ====
DJ Force & The Evolution

- 1993 "Fall Down On Me"
- 1993 "Raining Smiles"
- 1993 "Poltergeist"
- 1993 "Twelve Midnight"
- 1993 "Perfect Dreams"
- 1994 "High on Life"
- 1995 "Show Me Heaven"
- 1995 "Simply Electric"

A Sense of Summer

- 1995 "Around the World"
- 1995 "On Top"

==== Force & Styles ====
Force & Styles

- 1995 "All Over"
- 1995 "Harmony"
- 1996 "Down 2 Love"
- 1996 "Fun Fair"
- 1996 "Heart of Gold" (featuring Jenna)
- 1996 "Shining Down" (featuring Jenna)
- 1996 "Wonderland" (featuring Jenna)
- 1996 "Your Love (Get Down)"
- 1997 "Field of Dreams"
- 1997 "Follow Me"
- 1997 "Pacific Sun" (featuring Junior)
- 1997 "Paradise & Dreams" (featuring Junior)
- 1997 "Pretty Green Eyes" (featuring Junior)
- 1997 "Simply Electric"
- 1997 "United in Dance"
- 1998 "Cutting Deep" (featuring Junior)
- 1998 "Heart of Gold '98" (featuring Kelly Llorenna)
- 2001 "Field of Dreams" (featuring Jenna)
- 2001 "Look at Me Now" (featuring Junior)
- 2001 "Make Believe" (featuring Lisa Abbott)
- 2001 "Pretty Green Eyes" (featuring Junior)

==== Styles & Breeze ====
Breeze and Styles

- 2002 "Future Set"
- 2002 "You're Shining"
- 2003 "The Beat Kicks/2 the Dancefloor"
- 2004 "Heart Beats/Electric"

Futureworld

- 2002 "Chemical Love"

Styles and Breeze

- 2002 "All I Want"/"Don't Want You"
- 2002 "Black Magic, Bad Magic"/"Oxygen"
- 2002 "Overdrive"/"Energise"
- 2003 "Home (At Last)"/"Rainbow"
- 2003 "Sonic"/"Total XTC"
- 2004 "Heartbeatz"
- 2004 "You're Shining"
- 2005 Heartbeats (Remixes)
- 2005 "You're My Angel"
- 2006 "I Will Be"
- 2006 "Slide Away"
- Unreleased Come With Me

Darren Styles and Mark Breeze presents Infexious

- 2003 "Let Me Fly"
- 2010 "Won't Forget These Days"

Infextious

- 2003 "Let Me Fly"
- 2009 "Amigos"
- 2010 "Won't Forget These Days"

==== As solo artist ====
Unique

- 1998 Feelin' Fine
- 1998 Higher Ground
- 1998 5am
- 1998 Distant Skies

Darren Styles

- 2002 Black Magic
- 2002 Sirens
- 2004 Back 2 The Old School
- 2005 Cutting Deep
- 2006 Getting Better
- 2006 Save Me
- 2006 Jealous
- 2006 Skydivin
- 2007 Feel Love
- 2007 Flashlight
- 2007 Girlfriend
- 2007 Feel Love
- 2008 Come Running
- 2010 Sound Without A Name
- 2010 Holding On
- 2014 Talk
- 2017 Feel Like This (with Gammer)
- 2017 Us Against The World
- 2017 Party Don't Stop (with Dougal and Gammer)
- 2018 Sky is Falling (with Stonebank featuring Emel)
- 2018 Long Way Down (with W&W featuring Giin)
- 2018 Home (with Dougal featuring Jacob Wellfair)
- 2018 Crash and Burn (with Tweekacore featuring Giin)
- 2018 Home (with Dougal featuring Jacob Wellfair)
- 2019 Never Let Me Down (featuring David Spekter)
- 2020 DLMD (with TNT)
- 2020 DYSYLM (with Gammer)
- 2020 Neon Hearts (featuring PollyAnna)
- 2020 Skank in the Rave (with Stonebank)
- 2021 Dance Again (with Timmy Trumpet and Azteck)
- 2021 Superhorn (with Gammer)
- 2022 Forever (with Olly James and Dee Dee)
- 2023 "Rave Into The Night" (with Diandra Faye)
- "Wasted" (with Toneshifterz)Monstercat

Styles

- 2002 Over and Over

Hixxy and Styles

- 2005 Rushins / The Theme #143

Ultrabeat vs Darren Styles

- 2007 Sure Feels Good
- 2008 Discolights

Darren Styles & N-Force

- 2008 Right by Your Side

Zero Hero (Stonebank and Darren Styles)

Title	Year
"Suffocate" (featuring Molly)	2013
"Theme"	2013
"Back Again"	2016
"Bass Drop"	2017

Rocket League songs as part of Zero Hero

- "Twilight" (2017)

== Music videos ==
Year	Music video	Director(s)
2004	"You're Shining" (Styles & Breeze)	
2005	"Heartbeatz" (Styles & Breeze)	
2006	"Save Me"	
2007	"Sure Feels Good" (vs. Ultrabeat)	Kevin Hewitt
2008	"Right by Your Side" (vs. N-Force)	
2008	"Discolights" (vs. Ultrabeat)	Paul Boyd
2008	"Girls Like You"	
2008	"Come Running" (featuring Francis Hill)	
2009	"Amigos" (Styles & Breeze)	
2009	"Don't Wanna Let Go" (vs. Ultrabeat)	Michael Holdaway
2009	"Outta My Head" (with Manian)	
2010	"Sound Without a Name"	
2010	"Holding On"	
