= High life =

High Life, The High Life, or Highlife may refer to:

== Film, television and theatre ==
- The High Life (1960 film), a German film directed by Julien Duvivier
- High Life (2009 film), a Canadian adaptation of the play by Lee MacDougall (see below)
- High Life (2018 film), a science fiction film directed by Claire Denis
- The High Life (American TV series), a 1996 American sitcom set in 1950s Pittsburgh
- The High Life (British TV series), a 1994–1995 British sitcom set in a small Scottish airline
  - The High Life (musical) (2026), based on the British TV series
- The Gay Life, a 1961 musical retitled The High Life for a 2005 revival
- High Life, a 1996 play by Lee MacDougall
- High Life, a 2017 web series by Luke Eve

== Music ==
- Highlife, a musical genre that originated in Ghana
- High Life Music, a Canadian record label

=== Albums ===
- High Life (Brian Tarquin album) or the title song, 2001
- High Life (Frankie Miller album) or the title song, 1974
- High Life (Wayne Shorter album) or the title song, 1995
- High Life (Eno and Hyde album), by Brian Eno and Karl Hyde, 2014
- High Life!, by Exit-13, 2007
- High Life, by Takashi Sorimachi, 1998
- High Life, by Gugun Blues Shelter, 2015
- Highlife (Randy Weston album), 1963
- Highlife (Sonny Sharrock album) or the title song, 1990
- The High Life (The Puppini Sisters album), 2016
- The High Life (Reef the Lost Cauze album), 2001
- The High Life, a mixtape by Mac Miller, 2009

=== Songs ===
- "High Life" (song), by Modern Romance, 1983
- "High Life", by Daft Punk from Discovery, 2001
- "High Life", by London Grammar from If You Wait, 2013
- "High Life", by Mono from Formica Blues, 1997
- "High Life", by Nelly Furtado featuring Ace Primo from The Spirit Indestructible, 2012
- "Highlife" (song), by Cypress Hill, 2000
- "Highlife", by the Dandy Warhols from Why You So Crazy, 2019
- "The High Life" (song), by Colt Ford and Chase Rice, 2014
- "The High Life", by In Fear and Faith from Imperial, 2010
- ”Highlife”, by Logic, 2023

== Other ==
- High Life de Belgique, a Belgian publisher
- Highlife (cellular automaton)
- Miller High Life, an American beer
- High Life, a 2010 novel by Matthew Stokoe
- High Life, an in-flight magazine for British Airways

== See also ==
- Low Life (disambiguation)
