= Kit Kittredge: An American Girl (soundtrack) =

Soundtrack album
- Released: June 17, 2008
- Genre: Film soundtrack
- Length: 39:41
- Label: New Line

Kit Kittredge: An American Girl is the official soundtrack of the 2008 comedy-drama film Kit Kittredge: An American Girl, starring Abigail Breslin, Chris O'Donnell, Joan Cusack, Stanley Tucci, Jane Krakowski, and Julia Ormond, and was released under the New Line Records label.

The original score was composed by Joseph Vitarelli. The soundtrack also features songs from the era, and recordings from Bridgette Bryant, The Puppini Sisters and Renee Olstead.

== Track listing ==
No.	Title	Writer(s)	Length
1.	"Side by Side"	Gus Kahn	2:49
2.	"Ain't We Got Fun"	Richard A. Whiting	2:44
3.	"When You're Smiling"	Larry Shay, Mark Fisher, Joe Goodwin	2:51
4.	"Bye Bye Blackbird"	Ray Henderson, Mort Dixon	4:12
5.	"Pack Up Your Troubles In Your Old Kit Bag"	George Henry Powell	2:21
6.	"Playmates"	Saxie Dowell	2:23
7.	"It's Only A Paper Moon"	Harold Arlen, E. Y. Harburg, Billy Rose	2:59
8.	"Don't Fence Me In"	Robert Fletcher, Cole Porter	3:26
9.	"My Shawl"	Xavier Cugat	3:13
10.	"Your Best Friend"	Joseph Vitarelli/Larry John McNally	2:25
11.	"An American Girl"	Joseph Vitarelli	4:59
12.	"Kit"	Joseph Vitarelli	5:19
