= Yesterday (soundtrack) =

Yesterday (Original Motion Picture Soundtrack)

Soundtrack album by various artists
- Released: 21 June 2019
- Recorded: 2018
- Length: 56:18
- Label: Capitol

Yesterday (Original Motion Picture Soundtrack) is the soundtrack to the 2019 film Yesterday. Released through Capitol Records on 21 June 2019, the soundtrack consisted of 27 tracks, mostly covers of the Beatles' songs performed in the film by Himesh Patel and Lily James, and cues from the incidental music underscored by Daniel Pemberton.

== Background ==
The film featured several Beatles songs performed by Patel, with Adem Ilhan as the film's music supervisor. For licensing the Beatles' discography, the producers nearly spent $10 million to acquire the rights from the band's music label Apple Records and Sony/ATV Music Publishing, which owned its music catalogue.

Daniel Pemberton underscored the incidental music, in his second collaboration with Boyle after Steve Jobs (2015). Pemberton recorded the music for 3–4 weeks during mid-2018, simultaneously with that of Spider-Man: Into the Spider-Verse. The recording held at the Abbey Road Studios (where Beatles had recorded most of the songs) and by mimicking the musical style of the band, Pemberton used the Mrs. Mills' piano which the band utilised it for the song "Lady Madonna" (1968) and placed tea towels over drums "to give them Ringo's very distinctive dampened sound".

According to Pemberton, "The idea was to get him comfortable with the songs and getting him to the stage where basically he could play Wembley Stadium." He worked with Patel to perform the covers of each song in a unique, as Boyle liked the "very raw, human performances" and refrained from over-produced sounds. Hence, he built Himesh a band for rehearsals so that he would be confident to play with other musicians and also perform in street corners to get into the character. Pemberton also recorded "Hey Dude" (Ed Sheeran's cover of "Hey Jude") for the film, though he was against doing so; he utilized the chorus of the original cover and used it in this song as well.

On 14 June 2019, Capitol Records unveiled the track list of the film's soundtrack that had featured 27 songs, along with a live studio performance of Patel recording the vocals for "Yesterday". The soundtrack was released the following week, in music streaming platforms and a 180-gram double LP vinyl record was unveiled on July 12.

Two original songs from the film performed by Ed Sheeran — "One Life" and "Penguins" — do not appear on the soundtrack. Both later appeared on Sheeran's Tour Edition of his = album.

== Reception ==
Marcy Donelson of AllMusic wrote "For the most part, Patel and the music department accomplish what they set out to do here, but in a world where the Beatles recordings do exist, nearly an hour of middle-of-the-road Beatles covers is the domain of die-hard Patel fans." Celine Teo-Blockey of Under the Radar assigned 5/10 to the album and wrote "when one gets home from the movie theatre, surely it's the original Fab Four that's going on the stereo or streaming device and not this soundtrack." Megan Sagar of Umusic called it as "a delightful tribute to The Beatles discography".

== Track listing ==
Yesterday (Original Motion Picture Soundtrack) track listing
No.	Title	Performer(s)	Length
1.	"Yesterday" (film version) (live at Abbey Road Studios)	Himesh Patel	1:32
2.	"The World Is Universal (Note: 1997–2011 Universal fanfare composed by Jerry Goldsmith; 2012 Universal fanfare composed and arranged by Brian Tyler.)" (Universal Fanfare)	Daniel Pemberton	0:22
3.	"Summer Song" (film version) (live at Abbey Road Studios)	Himesh Patel	1:48
4.	"Interlude I: A Day in the Life"	Daniel Pemberton	0:51
5.	"I Saw Her Standing There" (Tracks on the Tracks sessions)	Himesh Patel	1:45
6.	"Something" (from the album One Man Only)	Himesh Patel	2:48
7.	"Let It Be" (from the album One Man Only)	Himesh Patel	3:58
8.	"Interlude II: Strawberries"	Daniel Pemberton	0:41
9.	"Carry That Weight" (film version) (live at Abbey Road Studios)	Himesh Patel	1:48
10.	"Here Comes The Sun" (from the album One Man Only)	Himesh Patel	2:49
11.	"The Long and Winding Road" (recorded backstage)	Himesh Patel	1:38
12.	"Interlude III: Gorleston Beach"	Daniel Pemberton	0:34
13.	"Help!" (live at Pier Hotel)	Himesh Patel	2:38
14.	"Yesterday" (from the album One Man Only)	Himesh Patel	2:11
15.	"She Loves You" (Tracks on the Tracks sessions)	Himesh Patel	1:37
16.	"A Hard Day's Night" (from the album One Man Only)	Himesh Patel	2:43
17.	"Something" (film version) (live at Abbey Road Studios)	Himesh Patel	1:02
18.	"In My Life" (from the album One Man Only)	Himesh Patel	2:48
19.	"Interlude IV: Train Tracks"	Daniel Pemberton	0:14
20.	"I Want To Hold Your Hand" (Tracks on the Tracks sessions)	Himesh Patel; Lily James	1:53
21.	"Back in the U.S.S.R." (live at Wembley)	Himesh Patel	2:39
22.	"All You Need Is Love" (live at Wembley)	Himesh Patel	3:10
23.	"Interlude V: Yesterday's Rain"	Daniel Pemberton	1:02
24.	"The Long and Winding Road" (from the album One Man Only)	Himesh Patel	3:37
25.	"Hey Jude" (from the album One Man Only)	Himesh Patel	6:08
26.	"Ob-La-Di, Ob-La-Da" (live at Cleves School)	Himesh Patel	3:23
27.	"Interlude VI: Life Goes On"	Daniel Pemberton	0:39
Total length:			56:18

== Chart performance ==
Chart performance for Yesterday (Original Motion Picture Soundtrack)
Chart (2019–2021)	Peak position
Australian Albums (ARIA)	14
Portuguese Albums (AFP)	26
Scottish Albums (Official Charts)	12
Spanish Albums (Promusicae)	78
Swiss Albums (Schweizer Hitparade)	100
UK Albums (Official Charts)	40
UK Soundtrack Albums (Official Charts)	2

== Accolades ==
Accolades for Yesterday (Original Motion Picture Soundtrack)
Award	Date of ceremony	Category	Recipients	Result	Ref.
Hollywood Music in Media Awards	9 November 2019	Outstanding Music Supervision – Film	Angela Leus	Nominated	
Hollywood Music in Media Awards	9 November 2019	Best Soundtrack Album		Nominated	
St. Louis Film Critics Association	15 December 2019	Best Soundtrack		Nominated	
World Soundtrack Awards	12 August 2019	Film Composer of the Year	Daniel Pemberton	Nominated	
