= Birds of Prey (soundtrack) =

2020 soundtrack album by various artists

Birds of Prey: The Album

Soundtrack album by various artists
- Released: February 7, 2020
- Genres: Hip hop; pop; alternative rock
- Length: 42:52
- Labels: Atlantic; WaterTower
- Producers: Kevin Weaver; Brandon Davis; Joseph Khoury

Singles from Birds of Prey: The Album
- 1. "Diamonds" Released: January 10, 2020; 2. "Joke's on You" Released: January 17, 2020; 3. "Boss Bitch" Released: January 24, 2020; 4. "Sway with Me" Released: January 31, 2020; 5. "Experiment on Me" Released: February 7, 2020

Birds of Prey: The Album is the soundtrack album by various artists for the film Birds of Prey, released by Atlantic Records on February 7, 2020. Atlantic released five singles leading up to the album's release day. The album debuted at number 23 on the US Billboard 200, number nine in Australia, and within the top 40 in Canada, New Zealand, and Switzerland. It won the 2020 American Music Award for Top Soundtrack. A separate film score album, titled Birds of Prey (and the Fantabulous Emancipation of One Harley Quinn) – Original Motion Picture Score and composed by Daniel Pemberton, was released on February 14 by WaterTower Music.

== Background and development ==
In 2020, the film Birds of Prey (and the Fantabulous Emancipation of One Harley Quinn) (2020) was released and described as the "candy-colored, R-rated new entry" within the DC Extended Universe. Wanting to honour the classic superhero movie tradition as seen with the Suicide Squad soundtrack for the 2016 film of the same name, a soundtrack album was released alongside the film.

The director of the film, Cathy Yan, stated that music is a super important concept in the film, and that it "motivated [her]". She went on the say that "it kind of helps me create the characters". Yan and the production team worked closely with Atlantic Records to assemble a "sort of musical girl gang", and create an all-female soundtrack for this women-powered world. Kevin Weaver, president of the Atlantic Records West Coast of the soundtrack, went on to say he "was looking for a female, badass sensibility to tie directly back to Harley Quinn and the Birds of Prey characters" and he "wanted to mirror Harley's journey with a music sensibility that kind of spoke to those same themes and through-lines".

== Music and lyrics ==
The genres of the album have been described by Crimson staff writer, Annie Harrigan, as hip hop, pop, alternative rock and rap. Songs like "Boss Bitch", "So Thick" and "Diamonds" include uplifting lyrics and embody themes like "self-sufficiency, hard work, and confidence". "Experiment on Me" has "heavy guitar, a steady beat, and screamo-style vocals", while "Danger" is "one of the more hardcore tracks", featuring "strong beats, echoey and screamo vocals, and strong hip-hop and rock influences".

The album also included covers of the songs "It's a Man's Man's Man's World" by James Brown, "I'm Gonna Love You Just a Little More Baby" by Barry White, and "Hit Me with Your Best Shot" by Pat Benatar.

== Singles ==
The album's first single, "Diamonds" by Megan Thee Stallion and Normani, was released on January 10, 2020, with a music video inspired by Harley Quinn. The second single, "Joke's On You" by Charlotte Lawrence, was released on January 17. The third single, "Boss Bitch" by Doja Cat, was released January 24 with a music video. The fourth single was "Sway with Me" by Saweetie and Galxara, with a music video featuring Ella Jay Basco reprising her role as Cassandra Cain from the film, and was released on January 31. The fifth single, "Experiment On Me" by Halsey, was released on February 7, alongside the album's release. A solo version of "Sway with Me" by Galxara was released as a standalone single on May 1.

== Commercial performance ==
The album debuted at number 23 on the Billboard 200 chart, and was the week's fifth best-selling album. "Boss Bitch" by Doja Cat was the only single from the album to chart on the Billboard Hot 100 at number 100. "Diamonds" by Megan Thee Stallion and Normani peaked at number 16 on the Bubbling Under Hot 100 but missed the mainstream chart.

== Critical reception ==
Professional ratings
Review scores
Source	Rating
AllMusic	3.5/5 stars
Clash	7/10

The soundtrack was met with positive reviews. Variety regarded it as "one incredible needle drop after incredible needle drop, bursting with the energy, freedom and sometimes chaotic sounds reflected in [the film]". The use of only female artists was praised by Crimson, who noted that they "exhibit a broad range of musical genres and styles" and "despite drastic differences amid the artists", the songs "flow perfectly into the next in terms of style, genre, and lyrical content". AllMusic wrote, "while the album whips around genres at breakneck speed, everything fits together nicely", commending the "blend of energy, menace, and danger from a team of badass women". Clash praised the soundtrack, calling it an "incredible sonic companion to the [film], both of which show the world the power of an all-female roster, exploding with creative dexterity".

== Track listing ==
Track listing for Birds of Prey: The Album
No.	Title	Writer(s)	Producer(s)	Length
1.	"Boss Bitch" (Doja Cat)	Sky Adams; Imad Royal; Ashton Casey; Amala Zandile Dlamini	Royal; Adams	2:14
2.	"So Thick" (Whipped Cream featuring Baby Goth)	Caroline Cecil; Brianna Miller; Sean Turk	Whipped Cream	2:11
3.	"Diamonds" (Megan Thee Stallion and Normani)	Megan Pete; Kameron Glasper; Edgar Machuca; Normani Kordei; Tayla Parx; Jule Styne; Leo Robin; Madison Love; Louis Bell; Mike Arrow; Santeri Kauppinen	MD$; Bell; Arrow	3:19
4.	"Sway with Me" (Saweetie and Galxara)	Diamonté Harper; Norman Gimbel; Adam David Small; Earl Patrick Taylor; Jacob Uchorczak; Mich Hansen; Randall Hammers; Riana Kuring; Nick Sarazen; Pablo Beltrán Ruiz; Michael Pollack; Tia Scola; Quavious Marshall	Cutfather; Jacob Ubizz	2:48
5.	"Joke's on You" (Charlotte Lawrence)	Daniel Pemberton; Royal; Cara Salimando	Pemberton; Royal	3:04
6.	"Smile" (Maisie Peters)	Ben Ash; Maisie Peters	Two Inch Punch	2:38
7.	"Lonely Gun" (Cyn)	Matias Gabriel Mora; Cynthia Nabozny	Mora	2:38
8.	"Experiment on Me" (Halsey)	Ashley Frangipane; Peter Morén; John Eriksson; Bjoern Yttling; Jordan Fish; Oliver Sykes	Fish; Sykes	3:35
9.	"Danger" (Jucee Froot)	Pemberton; Royal; Terrica Alexander	Pemberton; Royal	2:27
10.	"Bad Memory" (K.Flay)	David Dahlquist; Kristine Meredith Flaherty; Patrick Morrissey	Dahlquist; Morrissey	2:55
11.	"Feeling Good" (Sofi Tukker)	Jon Hume; Sophie Hawley-Weld; Tucker Halpern	Hume; Sofi Tukker	3:03
12.	"Invisible Chains" (Lauren Jauregui)	David Pramik; Mark Williams; Jon Bellion; Lauren Jauregui; Ingrid Andress; E. Kidd Bogart; Raul Cubina	Pramik; Ojivolta	3:20
13.	"It's a Man's Man's Man's World" (Jurnee Smollett-Bell)	James Brown; Betty Jean Newsome	Royal; Andrew Orkin	2:56
14.	"I'm Gonna Love You Just a Little More Baby" (Summer Walker)	Barry White	London on da Track	2:53
15.	"Hit Me with Your Best Shot" (Adona)	Eddie Schwartz	Dustin Wise; Matt Bronleewe; Marie Hines	2:51
Total length:				42:52

== Personnel ==
- Manny Marroquin – mixing (1, 3–6, 10, 12)
- Jaycen Joshua – mixing (2)
- Phil Tan – mixing (7)
- Serban Ghenea – mixing (8)
- Ike Schultz – mixing (9, 13)
- Jon Hume – mixing, backing vocals, guitar, piano (11)
- Cyrus "NOIS" Taghipour – mixing (14)
- Derek "MixedByAli" Ali – mixing (14)
- Jeff Braun – mixing (15)
- John Hanes – mix engineering (8)
- Jaime P. Velez – engineering (3), vocal production (3)
- Emerson Mancini – mastering (1, 3–6, 8–10, 12, 13, 15)
- Colin Leonard – mastering (2)
- Dave Kutch – mastering (7)
- Joe Lambert – mastering (11)
- Imad Royal – programming (1, 5, 9, 13)
- Sky Adams – programming (1)
- Whipped Cream – programming (2)
- MD$ – programming (3)
- Louis Bell – programming (3)
- Mike Arrow – programming (3)
- Jacob Ubizz – programming (4)
- Cutfather – programming (4)
- Daniel Pemberton – programming (5, 9)
- Two Inch Punch – programming (6)
- Matias Mora – programming (7)
- Oliver Sykes – programming (8)
- Jordan Fish – programming (8)
- David Dahlquist – programming (10)
- Patrick Morrissey – programming (10)
- David Pramik – programming (12)
- Ojivolta – programming (12)
- Andrew Orkin – programming (13)
- London on da Track – programming (14)
- Matt Bronleewe – programming (15)
- Dustin Wise – programming (15)
- Marie Hines – programming (15)
- Ashley Jacobson – vocal engineering (12)
- Avena Savage – vocal engineering, vocal production (12)
- Josiah Bell – vocal production (13)
- Kuk Harrell – vocal production (3)
- Zachary Acosta – engineering assistant (14)
- Curtis "Sircut" Bye – engineering assistant (14)
- Mike Seaberg – mixing assistant (2)
- DJ Riggins – mixing assistant (2)
- Jacob Richards – mixing assistant (2)

== Charts ==
=== Weekly charts ===
Weekly chart performance for Bird of Prey: The Album
Chart (2020)	Peak position
Australian Albums (ARIA)	9
Austrian Albums (Ö3 Austria)	55
Belgian Albums (Ultratop Flanders)	113
Belgian Albums (Ultratop Wallonia)	113
Canadian Albums (Billboard)	26
French Albums (SNEP)	149
German Albums (Offizielle Top 100)	81
New Zealand Albums (RMNZ)	27
Swiss Albums (Schweizer Hitparade)	29
US Billboard 200	23
US Soundtrack Albums (Billboard)	2

=== Year-end charts ===
Year-end chart performance for Bird of Prey: The Album
Chart (2020)	Position
US Soundtrack Albums (Billboard)	17

== Original Motion Picture Score ==
Birds of Prey (and the Fantabulous Emancipation of One Harley Quinn) – Original Motion Picture Score

Film score by Daniel Pemberton
- Released: February 14, 2020
- Genre: Film score
- Length: 61:52
- Label: WaterTower Music
- Producer: Daniel Pemberton

Daniel Pemberton chronology
Motherless Brooklyn (2019)	Birds of Prey (and the Fantabulous Emancipation of One Harley Quinn) – Original Motion Picture Score (2020)	Enola Holmes (2020)

The separate film score titled Birds of Prey (and the Fantabulous Emancipation of One Harley Quinn) – Original Motion Picture Score composed by Daniel Pemberton was released on February 14, 2020, by WaterTower Music.

=== Track listing ===
No.	Title	Length
1.	"Flying High (Birds of Prey)"	1:53
2.	"The Fantabulous Emancipation Explosion"	1:32
3.	"Harley Quinn (Danger Danger)"	3:06
4.	"Birds of Prey"	2:16
5.	"Harley Gogo Agogo"	1:56
6.	"The Black Mask Club"	1:54
7.	"Stolen Diamond"	1:55
8.	"Bad Ass Broad (Whistle MF)"	3:07
9.	"Lonely in Gotham"	0:50
10.	"Black Canary Echo"	1:08
11.	"The Bertinelli Massacre (The Huntress Story)"	2:29
12.	"Bump It!"	2:19
13.	"Roman Sionis"	2:42
14.	"Lockdown"	2:27
15.	"Bruce and the Beaver"	1:26
16.	"Lotus Flower"	1:40
17.	"Femme Fatale"	0:19
18.	"Breakout!"	4:20
19.	"The Bertinelli Revenge"	1:57
20.	"I Want To Kill You Because I Can"	3:13
21.	"Zsasz Showdown"	2:30
22.	"Work Together"	2:05
23.	"Battle Commence"	2:33
24.	"Flight Together (Birds of Prey)"	4:59
25.	"Founders Pier"	1:46
26.	"Roller Vs Rollers"	3:27
27.	"The Fantabulous Emancipation of One Harley Quinn"	2:03
Total length:		61:52

== See also ==
- List of 2020 albums
