= Diamonds Are a Girl's Best Friend =

1949 jazz song

"Diamonds Are a Girls Best Friend"

Song by Carol Channing
- Released: 1949
- Genre: Jazz
- Songwriter: Leo Robin
- Composer: Jule Styne

"Diamonds Are a Girl's Best Friend" is a jazz song written for the stage musical Gentlemen Prefer Blondes (1949), with music by Jule Styne and lyrics by Leo Robin. Carol Channing introduced the song in the original Broadway production, and Marilyn Monroe followed in the film version, performing it in a strapless, "now-iconic satin pink gown" in a rendition ranked by the American Film Institute the 12th best film song of the 20th century.

The song has since been covered by scores of singers of various genres, such as Lena Horne, Eartha Kitt, Kylie Minogue, and Emmylou Harris, some in imitation of Monroe, whose rendition has inspired spectacles beyond the song itself.

== Marilyn Monroe version ==
"Diamonds Are a Girl's Best Friend"
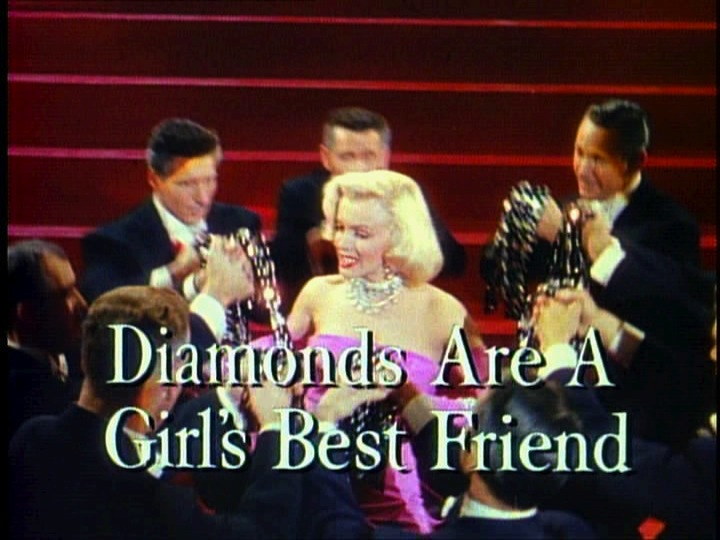

Song by Marilyn Monroe
- Released: 1953
- Songwriter: Leo Robin
- Composer: Jule Styne

The American actress and singer Marilyn Monroe performed the song in the 1953 film Gentlemen Prefer Blondes. Monroe's character, Lorelei Lee, has been followed on a transatlantic ocean liner by a detective hired by her fiancé's father, who wants assurance that she is not marrying purely for money. He is informed of compromising pictures taken with a British diamond mine owner and cancels her letter of credit before she arrives in France, requiring her to work in a nightclub to survive. Her fiancé arrives at the cabaret to see her perform this song, about exploiting men for riches. Diamonds are an element in another story line in the film, in which Lorelei is given a diamond tiara by the mine owner, in gratitude for her recovering the photographs. In a later scene, Jane Russell, who plays opposite Monroe, sings "Diamonds Are a Girl's Best Friend" in court, while pretending to be Lorelei.

Most of the song in the film is Monroe's own voice, and sources differ on how much help she had. The American Film Institute, TCM, and a biography of director Howard Hawks state the only help she had was for the brief high-pitched introduction to the song (usually not included in singles), which was sung by Gloria Wood. However, a 2007 article in The New York Times recounting the career of the famous ghost singer Marni Nixon claims Nixon dubbed the phrase "These rocks don't lose their shape." George Chakiris can be spotted as a member of the admiring male chorus.

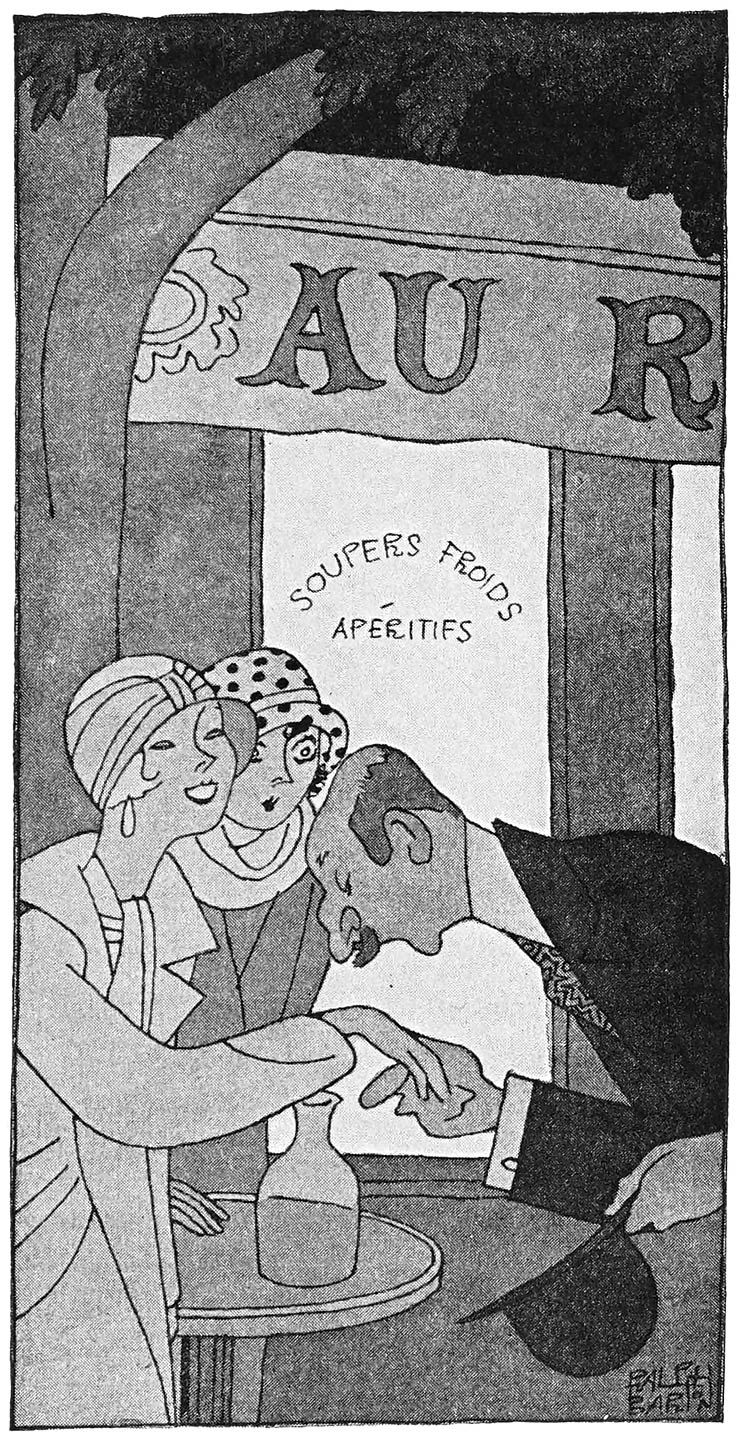
This frontispiece to the original Gentlemen Prefer Blondes novel was accompanied by the quote "Kissing your hand may make you feel very good but a diamond bracelet lasts forever"—a sentiment reflected in the start of the lyrics.

The number was later re-shot in CinemaScope, to be used as part of a CinemaScope demonstration held on the Fox lot in March 1953. Producer Darryl F. Zanuck told Daily Variety that it only took 3 1/2 hours to shoot the number in CinemaScope versus four days for the original film version. The public finally saw the CinemaScope version ten years later when it closed Fox's documentary tribute to Marilyn, but this has not been released on DVD or VHS.

=== Influence ===
Monroe's performance, ranked the 12th best film song of the century by the American Film Institute, has been referenced by entertainers ranging from Madonna and Kylie Minogue to Geri Halliwell and Anna Nicole Smith. The music video for Madonna's "Material Girl" references Monroe's "Diamonds" gown as she is surrounded by male dancers. The song was sampled by Megan Thee Stallion and Normani in 2020 for "Diamonds", with the music video featuring a set and costumes evoking Monroe's film performance. Monroe's vocals can also be heard in the background throughout the song. Ryan Gosling's performance of "I'm Just Ken" from the film Barbie at the 96th Academy Awards in 2024 was also inspired by Monroe's performance.

=== Product placement campaign ===
The display of diamonds in Hollywood films and songs is one of the most successful cases of product placement in marketing history. The diamond company De Beers, which dominates the world market for diamonds, engaged advertising company N.W. Ayer in the 1930s and 1940s to make diamonds more popular. The advertising company came up with the idea of placing diamond jewelry on idols in popular movies. Diamonds were placed in several Hollywood films, including Gentlemen Prefer Blondes and Diamonds Are Forever, and in songs such as "Diamonds Are a Girl's Best Friend". This campaign made engagement rings with diamonds popular and made diamond sales rise dramatically.

== Moulin Rouge! version ==
The song is also featured in the 2001 film Moulin Rouge!, in which it is sung principally by Nicole Kidman in the role of Satine, the (fictional) star performer of the famous Moulin Rouge nightclub in Paris, at the turn of the 20th century. This film version is technically a musical adaptation that director Baz Luhrmann titled "Sparkling Diamonds". Although it consists almost entirely of an adaptation of "Diamonds Are a Girl's Best Friend", this version differs from the lyrics in Gentlemen Prefer Blondes in several ways. For example, it does not include the name Harry Winston in the chant of famous jewelers; rather, Moulin Rouge founder Charles Zidler's name was changed to Harold in the film, so his name replaces Winston's in the song as "Harry Zidler". Black Starr & Frost-Gorham was known by that name only after 1925, but instead of using their 1875-1925 name of "Black, Starr & Frost", the Luhrmann film's makers substituted nonsense words (understood by many listeners as "Ross Cole"; in the 2002 DVD release, the words printed in the text captioning are "Black Star, Roscor"). And the potentially anachronistic line "help you at the Automat" was altered in the Luhrmann film to "help you feed your pussycat". Additionally, a lyrical snippet from Madonna's song "Material Girl" was worked into this adaptation of the song.

== Other notable versions ==
- Ethel Merman recorded the song in 1950.
- Jo Stafford recorded the song in 1950.
- Lena Horne recorded the song in 1958, for her album Give the Lady What She Wants.
- Della Reese recorded the song in 1960, for her album Cha Cha Cha.
- Julie London recorded the song in 1961.
- Eartha Kitt recorded the song in 1962.
- Carol Channing recorded the song again in 1974 for the musical Lorelei, a revised version of Gentlemen Prefer Blondes.
- Bertice Reading recorded the song in 1979.
- Emmylou Harris recorded a country/rock version in 1983, for her album White Shoes.
- Kylie Minogue performed this song in 1995. She also performed the song in 1999, dressed as Marilyn Monroe for the opening of 20th Century Fox's Australian Studios. In 2007, she recorded another version for her film White Diamond.
- Anna Nicole Smith recorded the song in 1998. The single went on to reach the top 100 dance singles in France.
- In the 100th episode of Gossip Girl, titled "G.G.", Serena Van der Woodsen (portrayed by Blake Lively) has a dream in which she is Marilyn Monroe and sings "Diamonds Are a Girl's Best Friend".
- Christina Aguilera performed the song in the film Burlesque (2010). Kristen Bell and Julianne Hough first lip-synched Marilyn's version, then Christina finished it with her own vocals. Later, in 2023, Aguilera sang "Diamonds Are a Girl's Best Friend" during her second concert residency—Christina Aguilera at Voltaire.
- The Puppini Sisters sing a version on their 2011 album Hollywood.
- Shirley Bassey and Paloma Faith sing the song for Bassey's album Hello Like Before (2014).
- In the 2015 Cartier advertisement The Magic of Diamonds, Karen Elson performs an abridged version of "Diamonds Are a Girl's Best Friend".
