= Why Do You Love Me (Charlotte Lawrence song) =

2019 single by Charlotte Lawrence

Single by Charlotte Lawrence
- Released: July 19, 2019
- Genre: Dark-pop
- Length: 2:51
- Label: Atlantic; Gold Tooth
- Songwriters: Charlotte Lawrence; Alan Lee Gordon; Ali Tamposi; Andrew Wotman; Charlie Puth; Garry Bonner; Louis Bell; Ryan Tedder
- Producers: Charlie Puth; Louis Bell; Andrew Watt

Charlotte Lawrence singles chronology
"Stole Your Car" (2018)	"Why Do You Love Me" (2019)	"Navy Blue" (2019)

Music video
- "Why Do You Love Me" on YouTube

"Why Do You Love Me" is a song by American singer-songwriter Charlotte Lawrence, released on July 19, 2019, through Atlantic and Gold Tooth Records. It was later included in digital edition of her second extended play, Charlotte (2021).

== Background ==
Speaking about "Why Do You Love Me", she stated that she finds it easier to write about sad emotions and enjoys the contrast of pairing them with energetic production. Emphasizing the importance of creative risk-taking, Lawrence noted that she never wants to "play it safe" when it comes to making music.

== Composition and reception ==
"Why Do You Love Me" is a dark-pop song that contrasts emotionally charged lyrics with bright, melodic production. Opening with the line "I hate your friends, I hate your mom and dad, I guess they hate me back", the song sets a confrontational and self-aware tone, exploring the complexities of romantic frustration through a lens of teenage angst and vulnerability. Produced by Andrew Watt and Ryan Tedder, the track features staccato guitar riffs, pulsing basslines, and synth-laced melodies.

Atwood Magazine's Luke Pettinan noted its brooding production, crafted by Tedder and Watt, instantly captivates listeners. Katy Hills of The Line of Best Fit noted that the song flips the narrative of idealized young love, presenting a more defiant and emotionally complex perspective.

== Personnel ==
Credits were adapted from AllMusic.

- Alan Gordon – composer
- Ali Tamposi – composer
- Andrew Luftman – production coordination
- Andrew Watt – guitar, instrumentation, producer, programmer
- Andrew Wotman – composer
- Charlie Puth – composer, instrumentation, keyboards, producer, programmer, background vocals
- Charlotte Lawrence – composer, lead vocals
- David Silberstein – production coordination
- Drew Salamunovich – production coordination
- Garry Bonner – composer
- Ian Cripps – A&R
- Jeremy "J Boogs" Levin – production coordination
- Louis Bell – composer, instrumentation, producer, programmer
- Manny Marroquin – mixing
- Paul Lamalfa – engineer
- Ryan Tedder – composer
- Samantha Corrie Schulman – production coordination
- Sarah Shelton – production coordination
- Zvi Edelman – production coordination
