= Navy Blue (Charlotte Lawrence song) =

2019 single by Charlotte Lawrence

Single by Charlotte Lawrence
- Released: September 27, 2019
- Length: 2:41
- Label: Atlantic; Gold Tooth
- Songwriters: Charlotte Lawrence; Ali Tamposi; Andrew Wotman; Charlie Puth; Ryan Tedder; Trent Reznor
- Producers: Charlie Puth; Andrew Watt

Charlotte Lawrence singles chronology
"Why Do You Love Me" (2019)	"Navy Blue" (2019)	"God Must Be Doing Cocaine" (2019)

Visualizer
- "Navy Blue" on YouTube

"Navy Blue" is a song by American singer-songwriter Charlotte Lawrence, released through Atlantic and Gold Tooth Records on September 27, 2019. She co-wrote the song with Andrew Watt, Ryan Tedder, Charlie Puth, and Ali Tamposi. It samples Nine Inch Nails's single "Hurt" (1994).

== Background and composition ==
Following her single "Why Do You Love Me", Lawrence released "Navy Blue" on September 27, 2019. It was written by Lawrence alongside Andrew Watt, Ryan Tedder, Charlie Puth, and Ali Tamposi. Nine Inch Nails frontman Trent Reznor also has a songwriting credit, as the song samples their 1994 song "Hurt".

As noted by Briony Chappell of The Line of Best Fit, "Navy Blue" opens with a "delicate guitar melody" layered beneath Lawrence's "ethereal vocals", as it gradually builds to a "bass-heavy chorus". Ones to Watch's Maxamollion Polo noted that the track "excels in the way it directly juxtaposes its softest and most heart-pounding moment".

== Promotion ==
To promote "Navy Blue", Lawrence appeared in the Music Box performance series, also performing "Why Do You Love Me". She further supported the song with live tour dates in the United Kingdom, including stops at London's Shepherd's Bush Empire and Gorilla in Manchester.

== Personnel ==
Credits were adapted from AllMusic.

- Ali Tamposi – composer
- Andrew Luftman – production coordination
- Andrew Watt – guitar, producer
- Andrew Wotman – composer
- Charlie Puth – composer, keyboards, producer
- Charlotte Lawrence – composer, primary artist, vocals
- David Silberstein – production coordination
- Drew Salamunovich – production coordination
- Jeremy "J Boogs" Levin – production coordination
- Manny Marroquin – mixing
- Paul Lamalfa – engineer
- Ryan Tedder – composer
- Samantha Corrie Schulman – production coordination
- Sarah Shelton – production coordination
- Trent Reznor – composer
- Zvi Edelman – production coordination
