= Low Life =

Low Life, Low-Life, or Lowlife(s) may refer to:

- Low-life, a person considered morally unacceptable by their community

== Film ==
- The Low Life, a 1995 American film by George Hickenlooper
- Low Life (2004 film), a South Korean film by Im Kwon-taek
- Lowlife (2012 film), a Canadian horror film by Seth A. Smith
- Lowlife (2017 film), an American film by Ryan Prows
- Low Life (2022 film), an American thriller directed by Tyler Michael James

== Literature ==
- Low Life (book), a 1991 book by Lucy Sante
- Low Life (comics), a 2000 AD comic story in the world of Judge Dredd
- Lowlife (comics), a 1992–1995 series by Ed Brubaker
- Lowlifes, a 2018 IDW Publishing comics series

== Music ==
- Low Life Records, a British record label
- Lowlife (band), a 1985–1997 Scottish band

=== Albums ===
- Low-Life, by New Order, 1985
- Low Life (Peter Brötzmann and Bill Laswell album) or the title song, 1987
- Lowlife: The Paris Concert, by Tim Berne, 1995
- Low Life (EP), by Massive Ego, or the title song, 2014

=== Songs ===
- "Low Life" (song), by Future, 2016
- "Lowlife" (song), by Poppy, 2015
- "Low Life", by the 4-Skins from The Good, The Bad & The 4-Skins, 2007 reissue
- "Low Life", by Bryan Adams, the B-side of "Have You Ever Really Loved a Woman?", 1995
- "Low Life", by Death from Spiritual Healing, 1990
- "Lowlife", by John Eddie
- "Lowlife", by Dizzyisdead featuring Mod Sun, 2025
- "Low Life", by the Police, the B-side of "Spirits in the Material World", 1981
- "Lowlife", by Theory of a Deadman from The Truth Is..., 2011
- "Low Life", by Ufo361, 2021
- "Low Life", by X Ambassadors from VHS, 2015
- "Low Life", by ZieZie, 2017
- "Low Life", by Lucinda Williams from World's Gone Wrong, 2026
