= Joke's on You =

2020 single by Charlotte Lawrence

Single by Charlotte Lawrence

from the album Birds of Prey
- Released: January 17, 2020
- Genre: Pop
- Length: 3:04
- Label: Atlantic
- Songwriters: Daniel Pemberton; Imad Royal; Cara Salimando
- Producers: Daniel Pemberton; Imad Royal

Charlotte Lawrence singles chronology
"God Must Be Doing Cocaine" (2019)	"Joke's on You" (2020)	"Slow Motion" (2020)

Birds of Prey singles chronology
"Diamonds" (2020)	"Joke's on You" (2020)	"Boss Bitch" (2020)

Music video
- "Joke's on You" on YouTube

"Joke's on You" is a song by American singer-songwriter Charlotte Lawrence. It was released on January 17, 2020, through Atlantic Records, as the second single from the soundtrack Birds of Prey (2020). The music video of the song was released on February 7, 2020.

== Critical reception ==
The Line of Best Fit described "Joke's on You" as a catchy and dramatic pop track, noting its insistent intro reminiscent of Supertramp's "The Logical Song" and the haunting choir throughout. The review praised Lawrence's vocals as "irreproachable" and highlighted the contrast between organic strings and electronic elements in the production. The song was also seen as capturing the empowered tone of the Birds of Prey soundtrack, calling it "a timeless song for the modern pop fan." Nylon noted that the song showcases Lawrence's signature style of pairing dark moods with strong pop melodies.

== Charts ==
Chart performance for "Joke's on You"
Chart (2020)	Peak position
UK Singles Sales Chart (OCC)	85
UK Singles Downloads Chart (OCC)	85
