= Let Me Fly (Styles & Breeze song) =

Single by Darren Styles & Mark Breeze present Infextious
- Released: 24 March 2003
- Recorded: 2002; The Nastyboyz Studios
- Genre: Vocal trance
- Length: 3:38
- Label: Nukleuz
- Songwriter(s): Darren Styles, Mark Breeze
- Producer(s): Darren Styles, Mark Breeze

Darren Styles singles chronology
"Black Magic" (2002)	"Let Me Fly" (2003)	"Chemical Love" (2003)

"Let Me Fly" is a vocal trance song written and recorded by Darren Styles and Mark Breeze. It was released as a single in 2003 and reached No. 59 on the UK Singles Chart.

== Track listing ==
CD single

1. "Let Me Fly" (Infextious radio edit) – 3:38
2. "Let Me Fly" (Muse Zikka's Pink Pocket radio edit) – 3:21
3. "Let Me Fly" (Infextious extended mix) – 6:31
4. "Let Me Fly" (Styles & Breeze remix) – 5:59

12-inch single

1. "Let Me Fly" (original mix) – 6:31
2. "Let Me Fly" (club mix) – 7:01

12-inch single

1. "Let Me Fly" (club mix) – 7:01
2. "Let Me Fly" (Infextious extended mix) – 6:31
3. "Let Me Fly" (Styles & Breeze remix) – 5:59

12-inch single

1. "Let Me Fly" (The Disco Brothers remix) – 7:44
2. "Let Me Fly" (Ilogik remix) – 7:15
3. "Let Me Fly" (Futureworld remix) – 5:43

== Personnel ==
Darren Styles & Mark Breeze present Infextious

- Darren Styles – producer, engineer
- Mark Breeze – producer, engineer

Production

- Peter Pritchard – executive producer
- Mark Wilson – executive producer

Additional musicians

- Lisa Abbott – vocals

== Chart performance ==
Chart	Peak Position
UK Singles Chart	59
