= Marcella Puppini =

Italian singer-songwriter

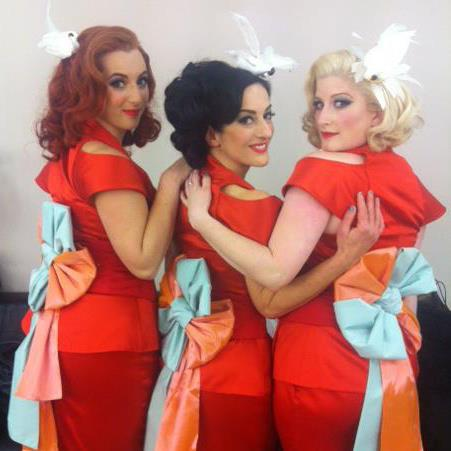
- Marcella Puppini (middle) with Emma Smith (left) and Kate Mullins (right) as part of The Puppini Sisters, backstage at The Graham Norton Show, Christmas 2012

Background information
- Born: Bologna, Italy
- Genres: A cappella, close harmony, pop, jazz, swing
- Occupations: Singer, songwriter, record producer
- Years active: 1999–present
- Labels: UCJ, Verve
- Member of: The Puppini Sisters
- Website: marcellapuppini.com

Marcella Puppini is an Italian singer, songwriter, and the founder of The Puppini Sisters.

== Biography ==
Marcella Puppini started playing the piano at age five and hoped to become an opera singer. At the age of 18, having completed her A levels in Classics (Ancient Greek, Latin, Italian Literature and Art History), Puppini moved to London to study at Central Saint Martins College of Art and Design. Having graduated in fashion, Puppini became Accessories Production Manager at Vivienne Westwood Studios but kept her side career as a singer in clubs all around London.

In 1999, she left the fashion world and embarked on a degree course at Trinity College of Music, where she graduated in Jazz Performance and Composition.

Her first band was called Dead Sex Kitten. She appeared on Rich B's song "Revolution". She also performed in her own name in the jazz and cabaret scene in the UK and Italy.

In 2004, Puppini created a new group called the Puppini Sisters, a close-harmony trio inspired by the sister groups of the 1930s and '40s. The Puppini Sisters' debut album, Betcha Bottom Dollar (UCJ, 2006), was awarded a Gold disc in the UK.

Puppini became involved in alternative performance art. She worked with Marisa Carnesky on Ghost Train, with Paloma Faith in 2005, with The Whoopee Club as musical director, and with Duckie.

She founded Marcella and The Forget Me Nots. The band's first album came out in January 2010 as part of Twisted Cabaret, a part-audio, part-video compilation curated by French label Volvox. Marcella and The Forget Me Nots changed formation in 2010 to become an indie-art-punk-Weimar inspired band and released Born Beautiful in 2011.

Puppini has been working as a regular guest conductor for the Georgy Garanian Big Band, formerly known as the Russian State Big Band. She has performed in Moscow, Siberia, and in Izhevsk as part of a Tchaikovsky festival.

In May 2013, she was nominated as the Mayoress of Camden.

In 2015, Puppini released Everything Is Beautiful, her first solo album of original material, which she describes as "electro vintage, because it's not just electro swing, it's a mixture of different vintage styles interpreted with an electronic sound."
