= Charlotte Lawrence =

American singer-songwriter and model (born 2000)

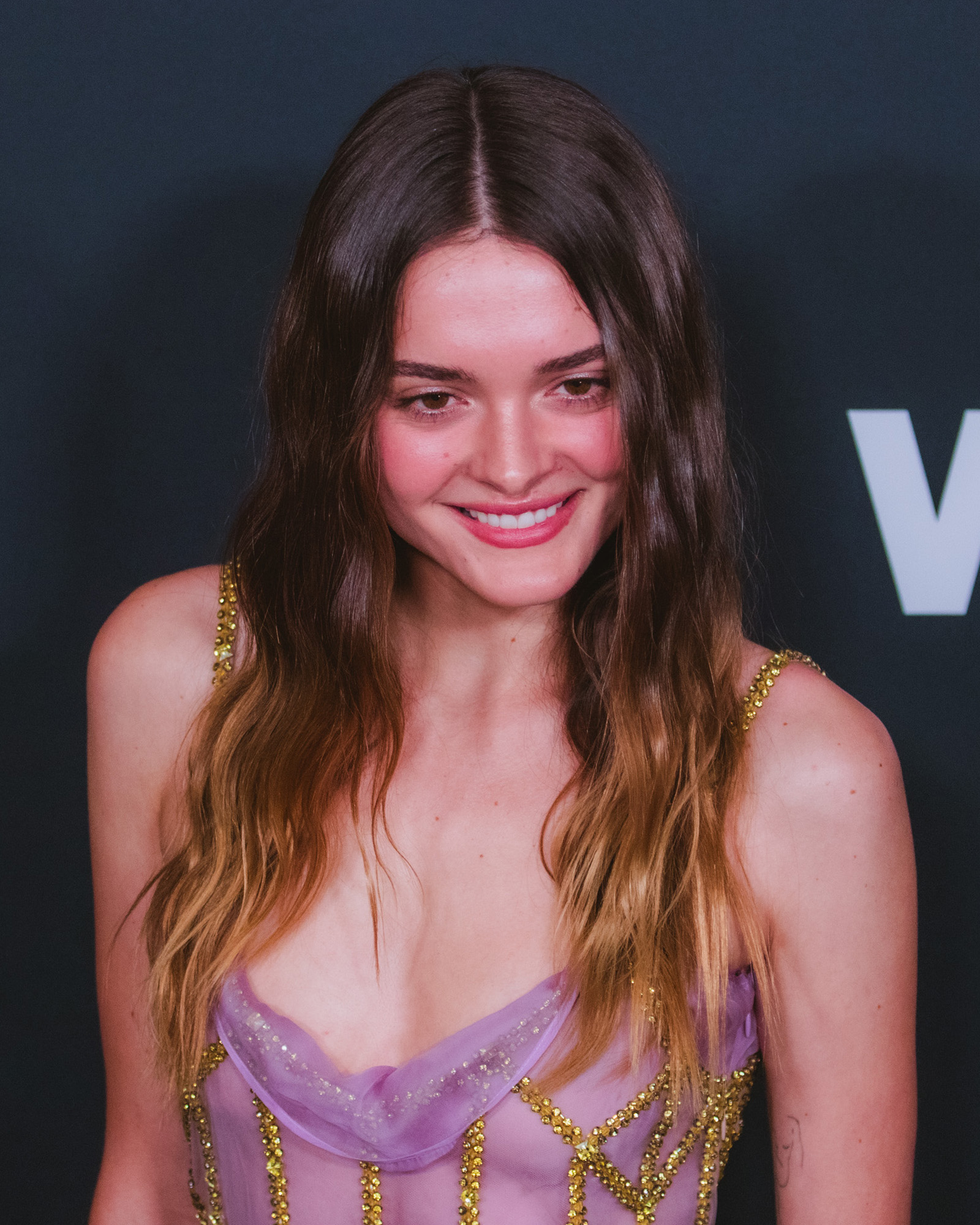
- Lawrence in 2026
- Born: June 8, 2000 (age 26); Los Angeles, California, U.S.
- Occupations: Singer; songwriter; actress; model
- Years active: 2014–present
- Relatives: Bill Lawrence (father); Christa Miller (mother); Susan Saint James (great-aunt)
- Musical career
- Genre: Electropop
- Labels: Human Re Sources; Atlantic
- Website: charlottelawrence.com

Charlotte Sarah Lawrence (born June 8, 2000) is an American singer, songwriter, actress, and model. She began singing and playing piano in her early childhood, drawing inspiration from her father's work as a television writer and her mother's background in acting and music supervisor in television.

Lawrence featured on Kaskade's single "Cold as Stone" in 2018 and released her debut EP Young later that year. Her second EP Charlotte was released in 2021. Her debut studio album Somewhere was released in 2025. As a model, she is signed to IMG Models and has appeared in magazines such as Teen Vogue and Harper's Bazaar.

== Early life ==
Charlotte Sarah Lawrence was born in Los Angeles on June 8, 2000, the daughter of actress Christa Miller and television producer Bill Lawrence. She is the grand-niece of actress Susan Saint James, and her paternal great-great-great-grandfather was real estate mogul William Van Duzer Lawrence. She is of Dutch descent. She began singing as a child. She attended Marymount High School in Los Angeles, where she was on the volleyball and basketball teams.

Despite her parents not having musical backgrounds, Lawrence was raised in a highly creative environment that deeply influenced her artistic development. Her father's work as a television writer inspired her passion for songwriting, while her mother's music supervision experience and eclectic taste introduced her to influential artists like Joni Mitchell and Elliott Smith at an early age. She began piano lessons at the age of five, combining classical training with her love for pop music, an early blend that shaped her approach as a musician.

== Career ==
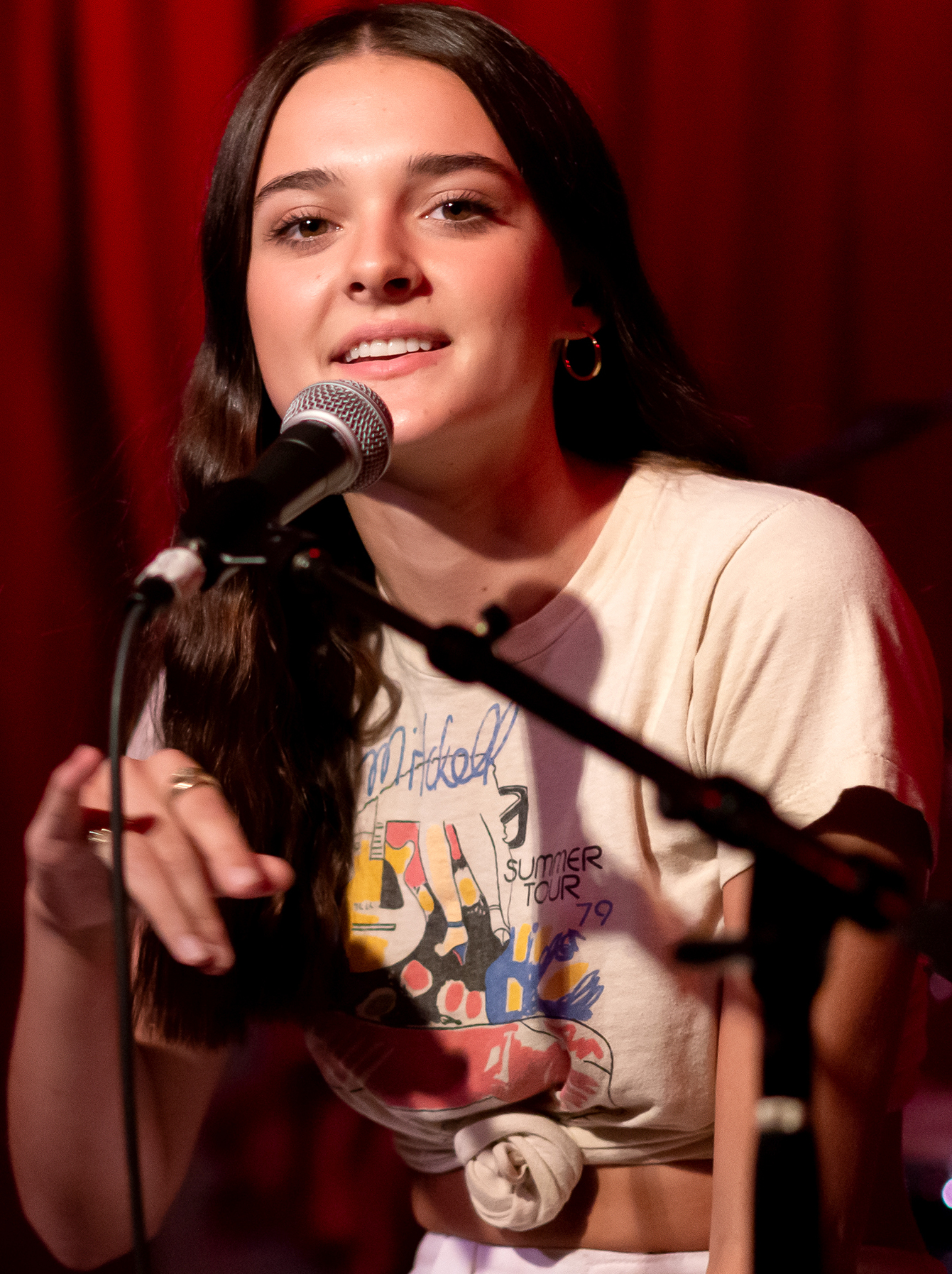
Lawrence in August 2018

In March 2018, Lawrence featured on Kaskade's single "Cold as Stone". In June 2018, she released her debut EP, Young. Lawrence signed with Atlantic Records in 2019, debuting with the single "Why Do You Love Me". She continued releasing digital singles throughout 2020, gaining significant attention when "Joke's on You" was featured on the soundtrack of the 2020 DC Comics film Birds of Prey. As a model, she is signed to IMG Models and has appeared in magazines such as Teen Vogue and Harper's Bazaar.

Lawrence released her second EP Charlotte on March 5, 2021. Following the EP, Lawrence released the song "Morning", produced by Ben Gibbard of Death Cab and Andy Park. Lawrence cited Gibbard and Park's influence on the song's creative process, describing the collaboration as a meaningful step in her artistic development. On February 28, 2024, she released a new single titled "Dog", described by People magazine as a melancholic, rock-influenced track. The song is part of her upcoming debut studio album, which was scheduled to be released in 2025. On April 26, 2025, she announced that her debut studio album Somewhere would be released on June 27, and that "Us Three" would serve as the final single from the album.

== Personal life ==
In March 2020, Lawrence revealed that she had tested positive for COVID-19. In a statement shared with her followers, she emphasized that she was feeling well and expected to make a full recovery, but used the opportunity to urge fans to take the pandemic seriously; stressing the importance of social distancing and self-isolation, she encouraged her audience to "stay inside" whether they were experiencing symptoms or not in order to protect vulnerable individuals. Lawrence stated, "This is not me asking for prayers... This is me pleading for you all to protect those less able to survive this virus." Her announcement was met with an outpouring of support from fellow artists and public figures such as Alec Benjamin, Ireland Baldwin, Nina Nesbitt, Gracie Abrams, and Lucy Hale, who shared encouraging messages in response. She is currently engaged to Andrew Watt.

== Discography ==
- Somewhere (2025)

== Filmography ==
=== Television ===
Year	Title	Role	Notes
2024–present	Bad Monkey	Caitlin	Recurring role
2025	Doctor Odyssey	Victoria	Episode: "Spring Break"

=== Film ===
Year	Title	Role	Notes
2025	Chapter 51	Greata Daniels	
