= Close and open harmony =

Types of note arrangements within chords

C major triad in close and open harmony

A chord is in close harmony (also called close position or close structure) if its notes are arranged within a narrow range, usually with no more than an octave between the top and bottom notes. In contrast, a chord is in open harmony (also called open position or open structure) if there is more than an octave between the top and bottom notes. The more general term spacing describes how far apart the notes in a chord are voiced. A triad in close harmony has compact spacing, while one in open harmony has wider spacing.

Close harmony or voicing can refer to both instrumental and vocal arrangements. It can follow the standard voice-leading rules of classical harmony, as in string quartets or Bach chorales, or proceed in parallel motion with the melody in thirds or sixths.

== Vocal music ==
Beginning of "Yankee Doodle" with accompaniment in close harmony
Beginning of Schubert's "Meeresstille", D. 216, is an example of accompaniment in open harmony, spaced according to the overtone series.

Close harmony originated in the 1800s in America.

Early radio quartets continued this tradition. Female harmonists, like The Boswell Sisters ("Mood Indigo", 1933) and The Hamilton Sisters and Fordyce ("Who? You That's Who!", 1927), who then became Three X Sisters, performed and recorded this style in the 1920s, and continued it on commercial radio of the 1930s. Close harmony singing was especially popular in the 1940s with pop and R&B groups using the technique quite frequently. The Andrews Sisters also capitalized on a similar style with swing music.

Many gospel and soul groups in the 1950s and 60s also used this technique, usually 3- or 4-part SSAA or TTBB harmony with one person (either bass or lead) doing a call-and-response type lead. Examples of this are The Blind Boys of Alabama, a group that is still recording today. Artists like The Beatles and Simon & Garfunkel used close harmony, echoing their chosen role-models, The Everly Brothers. The Louvin Brothers were a duo that used close harmony in the genre of country music.

Barbershop harmony has a unique harmonic structure: the melody is in the 2nd tenor or "lead" voice, while the 1st tenor takes the next part up, usually in 3rds, with the baritone and bass voices supporting. The bass line tends to be more rhythmic and covers the root notes of the harmonic progression, providing more "support" and independence than in classical vocal music, since Barbershop is usually sung a cappella. Public domain pieces, such as "Sweet Adeline", and newer pieces are abundant. National organizations promote the music with local chapters in many communities.

Soul and gospel groups flourished in America in the years after World War II, building on the foundation of blues, 1930s gospel songs and big band music. Originally called "race music" by white mainstream radio and its target market, it was the precursor to rock and roll and rhythm and blues of the 1950s, 1960s and 1970s, influencing many English and American artists of that era. They often used the more traditional TTBB or SSAA 4-part structure, but with heavy use of solos and call-and-response, which is rooted in the African American church. These groups sometimes sang a cappella but also used instrumental backing, especially when recorded by the bigger labels. Pop music and doo-wop can be seen as a commercialization of this genre.

== Instrumental music ==
Impressionist composers like Claude Debussy and Maurice Ravel often used close harmony in their works and other intervals, such as 7ths, 9ths, and 11ths may be used since the chords have four or more notes and the harmonies are more complex. In jazz, this influence flowered in the works of George Gershwin and Duke Ellington.

A well-known example of consistent instrumental close harmony is Glenn Miller's "Moonlight Serenade" which uses the full range of single-reed wind instruments (soprano clarinet, alto, tenor, and baritone saxophones) to make a distinctive sound by harmonizing the different sections all within a single octave. Miller studied the Schillinger technique with Joseph Schillinger, who is credited with helping Miller create the "Miller sound", and under whose tutelage he himself composed what became his signature theme, "Moonlight Serenade".

== Block harmony ==
In organ performance, block harmony means that close position chords are added below the melody in the right hand, and the left hand doubles the melody an octave lower, while in open harmony the middle note of the chord is played an octave lower creating an "open" space in the chord.

== See also ==
- Block chord
- Open chord
