= Fifth Harmony discography =

Band discography

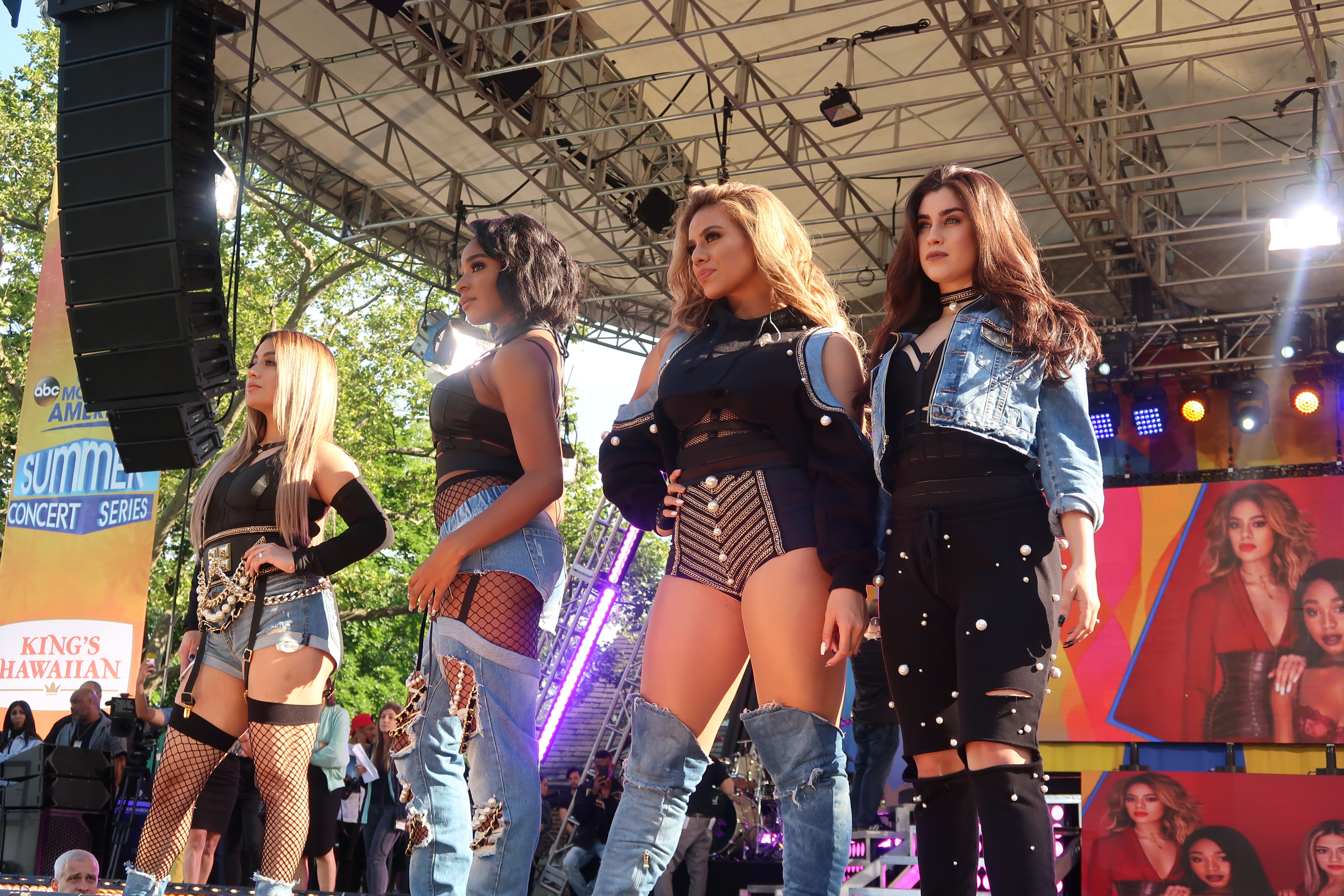
- Fifth Harmony performing on Good Morning America in 2017
- Studio albums: 3
- EPs: 6
- Singles: 11
- Music videos: 17
- Promotional singles: 11

American girl group Fifth Harmony has released three studio albums, six extended plays, 12 singles (including one as a featured artist), 11 promotional singles and 17 music videos. After finishing third on the second season of The X Factor US the group was signed to Epic Records though Syco Music. Less than a year later, Fifth Harmony released their debut single from their debut extended play, "Miss Movin' On". The single charted on the Mainstream Top 40 and New Zealand, peaking at 27 in both countries. It was certified Gold in the United States for selling combined sales and track-equivalent streams units of 500,000. The group's extended play, Better Together peaked at number six on the Billboard 200 and number 18 in New Zealand, charting in both countries similar to the group's lead single. As part of the promotion for Better Together, four other versions were released of the extended play, including an acoustic release, a Spanish-language acoustic and a standard Spanish-language translated version as well as a remix edition. The four former EPs were released in a 4-CD bundle titled Better Together: The Deluxe Edition, directly from Fifth Harmony's official store; it also included a download code for the latter remix EP, as it was not available physically. In Walmart exclusively, the Juntos and Juntos Acoustic EPs were bundled together, while at Target, "One Wish" was included as a bonus track on the original version; meanwhile, the iTunes edition of the original EP included "Me & My Girls", which the group performed in 2013 as guests on the third season of The X Factor, and served as a promotional single for the EP.

The group's debut studio album, Reflection was released in February 2015, and debuted at number five on the Billboard 200. Elsewhere, the album peaked within the top ten of Canada, Brazil and Spain while reaching the top thirty in ten additional countries. The lead single from the album, "Boss", debuted at number 43 on the Billboard Hot 100, earning the group their first top fifty entry. It also became the group's first single entry in the United Kingdom, charting at 21 as well as charting in the top forty of three additional countries. The following single, "Sledgehammer" reached number 40, earning them their first top forty entry and made its first entry in the Adult Pop Songs chart, peaking at number 36. Since their release, both songs have been certified Platinum by the Recording Industry Association of America. The group's third and final single, "Worth It" featuring American rapper Kid Ink, debuted at number 82 on the Billboard Hot 100, becoming a sleeper hit and staying in the charts for twenty-three weeks before peaking at number 12, earning Fifth Harmony their first top twenty entry in the United States. Additionally, the song managed to reach number one in three countries and peaked within the top ten in thirteen countries. Since its release, the song has been certified quadruple-platinum in the United States, double-platinum in Australia and Canada and platinum in five other countries. The song's music video has reached over two billion views on YouTube.

After the release of "Worth It", the group announced that they would be releasing a song for the animated fantasy–comedy film, Hotel Transylvania 2 titled "I'm in Love with a Monster". It was subsequently released a month before the film's premiere date and used in both the trailer and the film. The following year, the group released their lead single from their sophomore studio album, 7/27, titled "Work from Home". The song would become the group's highest-charting single, topping the charts in New Zealand, the Netherlands, and Brazil, and reaching the top ten in fourteen additional countries. In the United States, the song debuted at number 12 on the Billboard Hot 100 before reaching its peak at number four after charting for thirteen weeks, beating the previous peak that was upheld by their single, "Worth It". The song earned the group several certifications, including Diamond in Brazil and France, Quintuple Platinum in the US, Canada, and Australia, and Double Platinum in eight additional countries. The music video for the song has been viewed over two billion times on YouTube. Nearly three months later, the group released 7/27 and charted for the second time in the top five of the Billboard 200, this time at number 4, outperforming the previous feat that their debut album Reflection held. Elsewhere, the album reached number one in Brazil and Spain and the top ten in fourteen other countries. The group's following single, "All in My Head (Flex)" reached number twenty-four in the US and therefore earned the group their fourth top forty entry after charting for seven weeks. The song was eventually certified Platinum in the US and Gold in the UK and five other countries, while their third single "That's My Girl" was certified Gold in the US, UK, and Canada.

After group member Camila Cabello announced her departure from the group, Fifth Harmony released "Down", featuring rapper Gucci Mane, as the lead single from their third album in June. Two months later, the group's self-titled album Fifth Harmony was released and peaked at number 4 on the Billboard 200. It also reached number one in Spain and the top ten in the UK and seven other countries. "He Like That" was announced as the album's second single, and the music video was released on August 25, the same day the album was released. The video for promotional single "Angel" was released on August 11, just two weeks before the album's release. The music video for "Deliver" was released on September 8. "Down" peaked at number 42 on the Hot 100. "Por Favor", Fifth Harmony's duet with Pitbull, was released as the third single from the Spotify 11-track re-release of the album, and charted in some Spanish-speaking countries. The group also released "Can You See", a song from the soundtrack to The Star, and later released a Spotify-exclusive EP, Spotify Singles, which included exclusive live performance of "He Like That", as well as a cover of Calvin Harris' "Feels".

== Studio albums ==
List of studio albums, with selected details, chart positions, sales, and certifications
Title	Album details	Peak chart positions										Sales	Certifications
Title	Album details	US	AUS	CAN	GER	ITA	JPN	NZ	SPA	SWE	UK	Sales	Certifications
Reflection	Released: January 30, 2015; Label: Epic, Syco; Format: CD, LP, digital download	5	16	8	—	—	85	8	9	26	18	US: 155,000	RIAA: Platinum; BPI: Silver; MC: Gold; RMNZ: Platinum
7/27	Released: May 27, 2016; Label: Epic, Syco; Format: CD, LP, digital download	4	8	3	41	20	20	8	1	6	6	World: 1,600,000; US: 200,000	RIAA: Platinum; BPI: Gold; MC: Platinum; RMNZ: Platinum
Fifth Harmony	Released: August 25, 2017; Label: Epic, Syco; Format: CD, LP, digital download	4	9	7	56	16	19	7	1	21	10		
"—" denotes a release that did not chart or was not released in that territory.

== Extended plays ==
Title	Extended play details	Peak chart positions			
Title	Extended play details	US	US Dance	US Latin	NZ
Better Together	Released: October 18, 2013; Format: CD, digital download; Label: Epic, Syco	6	—	—	18
Juntos	Released: November 8, 2013; Format: Digital download; Label: Epic, Syco	—	—	2	—
Juntos: Acoustic	Released: November 8, 2013; Format: Digital download; Label: Epic, Syco	—	—	12	—
Better Together: Acoustic	Released: November 15, 2013; Format: Digital download; Label: Epic, Syco	189	—	—	—
Better Together: The Remixes	Released: November 25, 2013; Format: Digital download; Label: Epic, Syco	—	20	—	—
Spotify Singles	Released: December 6, 2017; Format: Streaming; Label: Epic, Syco	—	—	—	—
"—" denotes a release that did not chart or were not released in that territory.

== Singles ==
=== As lead artist ===
List of singles as lead artist, with selected chart positions and certifications, showing year released and album name
Title	Year	Peak chart positions										Certifications	Album
Title	Year	US	AUS	CAN	GER	ITA	JPN	NZ	SPA	SWE	UK	Certifications	Album
"Miss Movin' On"	2013	76	—	—	—	—	—	27	—	—	—	RIAA: Gold; RMNZ: Gold	Better Together
"Boss"	2014	43	—	75	—	—	—	—	37	—	21	RIAA: Platinum; BPI: Silver; RMNZ: Gold	Reflection
"Sledgehammer"	2014	40	88	63	—	—	—	36	—	75	112	RIAA: Platinum; IFPI SWE: Gold; MC: Gold; RMNZ: Gold	Reflection
"Worth It" (featuring Kid Ink)	2015	12	9	12	16	32	26	31	62	63	3	RIAA: 3× Platinum; ARIA: 2× Platinum; BPI: Platinum; BVMI: Platinum; FIMI: 2× Platinum; IFPI SWE: Platinum; MC: 2× Platinum; PROMUSICAE: Gold; RMNZ: 2× Platinum	Reflection
"I'm in Love with a Monster" (Note: "I'm in Love with a Monster" was released as a standalone single for the movie Hotel Transylvania 2 and only appears as a bonus track on the Japanese deluxe edition of Reflection.)	2015	—	—	—	—	—	—	—	—	—	—		Reflection
"Work from Home" (featuring Ty Dolla $ign)	2016	4	3	4	7	18	16	1	18	8	2	RIAA: 5× Platinum; ARIA: 6× Platinum; BPI: 3× Platinum; BVMI: 3× Gold; FIMI: 3× Platinum; IFPI SWE: 4× Platinum; MC: 5× Platinum; PROMUSICAE: 2× Platinum; RIAJ: Platinum (Note: Certification for streaming); RMNZ: 5× Platinum	7/27
"All in My Head (Flex)" (featuring Fetty Wap)	2016	24	19	21	—	66	98	8	90	—	25	RIAA: Platinum; ARIA: Platinum; BPI: Gold; FIMI: Gold; MC: Platinum; RMNZ: 2× Platinum	7/27
"That's My Girl"	2016	73	54	54	—	—	68	—	—	—	26	RIAA: Gold; BPI: Platinum; MC: Gold; RMNZ: Platinum	7/27
"Down" (featuring Gucci Mane)	2017	42	66	46	—	—	—	— (Note: "Down" did not enter the NZ Top 40 Singles Chart, but peaked at number three on the NZ Heatseekers Singles Chart.)	100	85	47	RIAA: Gold; BPI: Silver; MC: Gold; RMNZ: Gold	Fifth Harmony
"He Like That" (solo or remix featuring French Montana)	2017	— (Note: "He Like That" did not enter the Billboard Hot 100, but peaked at number one on the Bubbling Under Hot 100 Singles chart.)	—	75	—	—	—	— (Note: "He Like That" did not enter the NZ Top 40 Singles Chart, but peaked at number three on the NZ Heatseekers Singles Chart.)	—	— (Note: "He Like That" did not enter the Sverigetopplistan Singles chart, but peaked at number 10 on the Sverigetopplistan Heatseeker chart.)	—		Fifth Harmony
"Por Favor" (Note: The Spanglish version of "Por Favor" only appears as a bonus track on the Spotify reissue of Fifth Harmony.) (with Pitbull)	2017	—	—	—	—	—	—	—	—	—	—		Fifth Harmony
"—" denotes a recording that did not chart or was not released in that territory.

=== As featured artist ===
List of singles as featured artist, with selected chart positions, showing year released and album name
Title	Year	Peak chart positions								Certifications	Album
Title	Year	US Latin	US Latin Airplay	US Latin Pop	US Trop	ARG	COL	MEX	SPA	Certifications	Album
"Sin Contrato" (Maluma featuring Fifth Harmony)	2016	7	1	2	8	17	3	6	52	FIMI: Gold; PROMUSICAE: Platinum	Non-album single

=== Promotional singles ===
Title	Year	Peak chart positions			Album
Title	Year	US Bub.	NZ Heat.	UK	Album
"Me & My Girls"	2013	4	—	—	Better Together
"Better Together"	2013	—	—	—	Better Together
"Them Girls Be Like"	2014	—	—	—	Reflection
"All I Want for Christmas Is You"	2014	71	—	—	I'll Be Home for Christmas
"The Life"	2016	1	—	97	7/27
"Write on Me"	2016	—	—	173	7/27
"Santa Claus Is Coming to Town" (DNCE featuring Charlie Puth, Hailee Steinfeld, Daya, Fifth Harmony, Rita Ora, Tinashe, Sabrina Carpenter and Jake Miller)	2016	—	—	—	Non-album promotional single
"Angel"	2017	12	4	—	Fifth Harmony
"Deliver"	2017	—	—	—	Fifth Harmony
"Can You See"	2017	—	—	—	The Star
"Don't Say You Love Me"	2018	—	—	—	Fifth Harmony
"—" denotes a release that did not chart or were not released in that territory.

== Other charted songs ==
Title	Year	Peak chart positions	Album
Title	Year	US Latin Digital	Album
"Noche de Paz"	2014	23	I'll Be Home for Christmas

== Guest appearances ==
Title	Year	Other artist(s)	Album
"Mirrors"	2013	Boyce Avenue	Cover Collaborations, Vol. 2
"When I Was Your Man"	2013	Boyce Avenue	Cover Collaborations, Vol. 2
"Vienes o Voy"	2015	Juan Gabriel	Los Dúo

== Music videos ==
List of music videos, showing year released and director(s)
Title	Year	Director(s)
"Miss Movin' On"	2013	Hannah Lux Davis
"Me & My Girls"	2013	Hannah Lux Davis
"Boss"	2014	Fatima Robinson
"Sledgehammer"	2014	Fatima Robinson
"All I Want for Christmas Is You"	2014	Nigel Dick
"Worth It"	2015	Cameron Duddy
"I'm in Love with a Monster"	2015	Matt Stawski
"Work from Home"	2016	Director X
"Write on Me"	2016	Sam Lecca
"All in My Head (Flex)"	2016	Director X
"That's My Girl"	2016	Hannah Lux Davis
"Down"	2017	James Larese
"Angel"	2017	David Camarena
"He Like That"	2017	James Larese
"Deliver"	2017	David Camarena
"Por Favor"	2017	—N/a
"Don't Say You Love Me"	2018	P. R. Brown
