= Deliver (song) =

Promotional single by Fifth Harmony

from the album Fifth Harmony
- Released: August 25, 2017
- Studio: Westlake Studios (Los Angeles)
- Genre: R&B; pop; soul
- Length: 3:26
- Label: Epic; Syco
- Songwriters: Jeremy Reeves; Johnathan Yip; Ray McCullough; Ray Romulus; Taylor Parks; Whitney Phillips
- Producer: The Stereotypes

Music video
- "Fifth Harmony - Deliver" on YouTube

"Deliver" is a song recorded by American girl group Fifth Harmony from their self-titled third studio album (2017). It was released on August 25, 2017, as a promotional single. The Stereotypes produced "Deliver" and wrote it with Taylor Parks, and Whitney Phillips. An R&B, pop, and soul song, it includes lyrics about sexuality. Fifth Harmony based the song on 1990s R&B music by artists including Mariah Carey and Destiny's Child. Some critics praised "Deliver" for its composition and the group's vocals, while others were uncertain about its relevancy to 2017 music.

A music video, directed by David Camarena, was released on September 8, 2017. It features Fifth Harmony performing the song while wearing black gowns. Commentators wrote that classical Hollywood cinema, such as the 1953 film Gentlemen Prefer Blondes, inspired the video's style and the group's performance. The music video received positive reviews from critics. Fifth Harmony promoted the single further with live performances on Live with Kelly and Ryan and their PSA Tour.

== Recording and release ==
Taylor Parks and Whitney Phillips wrote "Deliver" with its producer The Stereotypes. Parks had previously worked with Fifth Harmony for their 2014 single "BO$$". The Stereotypes members Jeremy Reeves, Jonathan Yip, Ray McCullough, and Ray Romulos also play instruments for the song. The vocals were recorded by Ronald (RD) Estrada at Westlake Studios in Los Angeles, produced by Parx and Phillips, and programmed by the Stereotypes. Phil Tan mixed the song, and Parks provided additional vocals. Bill Zimmerman worked as an additional and assistant engineer.

Epic and Syco released "Deliver" as a promotional single from the group's self-titled third studio album (2017), and it was made available for digital download with the album's release on August 25, 2017. Fifth Harmony promoted the single with live performances. On September 8, 2017, they performed "Deliver" on Live with Kelly and Ryan. It was included on the set list for the PSA Tour.

== Composition and lyrics ==
"Deliver"
An audio sample of the song. Backed by a piano and "trap-lite beats", the composition was inspired by 1990s R&B.

"Deliver" is a R&B, pop, and soul song that lasts three minutes and 26-seconds. The instrumentation includes a piano and "trap-lite beats". Rob Copsey of the Official Charts Company cited the composition as an example of how the group experiments with "vintage R&B-soul". Stereogum's Chris DeVille identified the song as "piano-powered [and] gospel-tinged", and compared it to R. Kelly's 2007 single "I'm a Flirt". For "Deliver", Fifth Harmony sing about sexuality, through lyrics such as: "Yeah, my baby knows that I deliver / That's exactly I'm gon' do." Mike Nied of Idolator wrote that its message revolved around a "promise to unleash a sexy time". The Knoxville News Sentinel's Chuck Campbell described the hook as "aggressive R&B".

Members of Fifth Harmony had varying opinions on the single's influences and sound. Lauren Jauregui identified it as "a song from the album that best shows off its R&B moments", and compared it to music released by Destiny's Child. Discussing its composition, she said: "The melodies are crazy and the concept is awesome. It bounces, and it’s super clever. Definitely one of my favourites on the album." Ally Brooke described the composition as "almost a creative chaos", likening it to Motown. She cited "Deliver" as a mixture of funk, jazz, R&B, and soul. Normani said that the song reminded her of "Everlasting Love", a track from the group's debut album Reflection (2015). When talking about "Deliver" during a track-by-track review of the album, Dinah Jane said: "It’s the kinda song for when you’re getting down with your man." She described the single as reminiscent of 1990s R&B, specifically music recorded by Mariah Carey, and explained: "It's the direction and lane we were trying to touch." Jane went on:

Let me just say that [producer/songwriter] Taylor Parks delivered on this song — like, she wrote this song when we were in the room with her. She was there with us when we did 'BO$$,' and this is our second record with her, so once we played her some of our songs, she immediately came up with this direction. It definitely gives off the Mariah Carey tones — a little bit of R&B but modernized, and I think that’s why I love it so much. I love me some Mariah Carey, I grew up on that because of my mother. It’s just so special to me, especially melodically, it’s so thick — like, the little pre-chorus, it’s like you’re bouncing off of the melody, but you’re not.

— Dinah Jane, Billboard

== Critical reception ==
Music critics praised "Deliver", with some citing it as an album highlight. Mike Wass wrote that it should have been the album's third single. Matt Collar of AllMusic praised it as a "sensual, '90s-style R&B anthem, and Jon Caramanica of The New York Times wrote that it combined early Mariah Carey with contemporary trap and R&B. Spin's Katherine St. Asaph enjoyed how it differed from the album's overall focus on tropical music. AXS' Lucas Villa commended the group's vocals, saying that they "come through with soulful, sassy performance".

Other critics had a more negative response to "Deliver". Allan Raible of ABC News cited it as an example of how Fifth Harmony "are mining a now stale formula that Destiny’s Child pretty much perfected right around the time of 'Bills, Bills, Bills'". Discussing the Stereotypes' nomination for the Grammy Award for Producer of the Year, Non-Classical for the 60th Annual Grammy Awards in part for his work on "Deliver", (Note: The Stereotypes were nominated for the Grammy Award for Producer of the Year, Non-Classical for their work on "Deliver", "Before I Do", "Better", "Finesse", "Mo Bounce", "Sunshine", and "That's What I Like".) Nolan Feeney of Entertainment Weekly wrote that the Fifth Harmony song does not "feel nearly as essential in 2017" as the producers' other work.

== Music video ==
Music critics compared Fifth Harmony's look and performance in the music video to past girl groups and classic Hollywood.

The music video for "Deliver" was released on September 8, 2017, through Fifth Harmony's Vevo account. Media outlets described it as a "surprise" release. Prior to its release, the group tweeted: "Surprise, Harmonizers! We wanted to DELIVER something special as a thank you for your incredible support." It was the fourth video released to promote the album; the other three were "Down", "He Like That", and "Angel".

David Camarena directed the video, (Note: Camarena had previously directed the music video for Fifth Harmony's single "Angel".) which features the group performing the single while wearing matching black dress and gloves, diamonds, and "retro hairstyles". Daniel Kreps of Rolling Stone wrote that the group members appear in "full-on glam mode", and Ashley Iasimone of Billboard summed up the video as "subtle, synchronized stage moves and beauty shots". Alternating between black and white and color shots, the video features each singer in solo shots and a group performance.

The video received a positive response. A reviewer for MTV praised the group's energy in the video, writing: "It is clear that Fifth Harmony are more confident and comfortable than ever before this era, and the music is way more enjoyable for it!" Kreps and Iasimone compared Fifth Harmony's performance to those of previous girl groups. A writer from MTV wrote they "recreate the classic Hollywood glamour look" by playing "beauties from the 1930s". Brent Furdyk of ET Canada likened the video's style to Marilyn Monroe's performance of the song "Diamonds Are a Girl's Best Friend" in the 1953 film Gentlemen Prefer Blondes. Madeline Roth of MTV News contrasted the video for "Deliver" with the more sexual one for the group's single "He Like That".

== Credits and personnel ==
Credits adapted from the liner notes of Fifth Harmony:

- Instruments – Jeremy Reeves, Johnathan Yip, Ray McCullough, Ray Romulus
- Vocal Producer – Tayla Parx, Whitney Phillips
- Producer, Programmed By – The Stereotypes
- Recorded By – Ronald (RD) Estrada
- Additional Vocals – Tayla Parx
- Written By – Jeremy Reeves, Johnathan Yip, Ray McCullough, Ray Romulus, Taylor Parks, Whitney Phillips
- Engineer (Additional And Assistant) – Bill Zimmerman
- Mixed By – Phil Tan
