= Don't Say You Love Me (Fifth Harmony song) =

Promotional single by Fifth Harmony

from the album Fifth Harmony
- Released: May 18, 2018
- Studio: Windmark (Santa Monica, California)
- Genre: Tropical house
- Length: 3:13
- Label: Epic; Syco
- Songwriters: Nate Cyphert; Ian Kirkpatrick; Henrik Barman Michaelsen; Edvard Forre Erfjord; Lisa Scinta
- Producers: Kirkpatrick; The Electric

Music video
- "Don't Say You Love Me" on YouTube

"Don't Say You Love Me" is a song recorded by American girl group Fifth Harmony for their self-titled third studio album (2017). It was written by Nate Cyphert, Ian Kirkpatrick, Henrik Barman Michaelsen, Edvard Forre Erfjord, Lisa Scinta. A mid-tempo ballad, "Don't Say You Love Me" incorporates a tropical music production that runs through a moderate dembow rhythm, using a minimal instrumentation; it has an acoustic guitar riff and a syncopated drumline. Lyrically, it is a melancholic torch song that finds the group asking a "close but inconsistent" lover for an honest relationship. The lyrics are structured in verse–pre-chorus–chorus form.

"Don't Say You Love Me" was critically well-received by music critics who reviewed the song upon the album's release, with some citing it as one of the highlights of the record while praising the melancholy and vulnerability expressed in the song's lyrical content and sonic elements. An accompanying music video for "Don't Say You Love Me" was released on May 18, 2018 as a farewell before the group went into an indefinite hiatus. Directed by P.R. Brown, the video was shot in an abandoned warehouse and features the four members dancing in gowns and long dresses while emotionally singing the song. At the end of the video, the group embrace while holding hands in a circle before leaving through a door in the room that remains open as the last member leaves.

The song was performed for the first time live during their appearance on MTV's reboot of Total Request Live alongside "He Like That" on October 27, 2017. Fifth Harmony also sung "Don't Say You Love Me" to a small group of fans at the Hollywood Boulevard street in Hollywood, California, in February 2018. It was also included on the setlist of their PSA Tour (2017–18).

== Background ==
"Don't Say You Love Me" was written by Nate Cyphert, Henrick Barman Michaelsen, Edward Forre Erfiard, Lisa Scinta and its producer Ian Kinkpatrick. Originally the song was recorded by Demi Lovato, whose demo eventually leaked in November 2021. Fifth Harmony's vocals were recorded at the Windmark Recording studios in Santa Monica. Phill Than mixed the record at the Callanwolde Fine Arts Center in Atlanta, with Emerson Mancini later mastering it at the Larrabe Studios in North Hollywood.

When talking about the song during a track-by-track interview with Jason Lipshutz from Billboard, Dinah Jane revealed that she was sick during the recording of the song, and the producers felt that her voice would fit perfectly for the pre-chorus. Ally Brooke considered it a "special" record saying that the group was taken to a "very vulnerable place" during the recording sessions. When describing the song, Brooke said:

You don't really get to see that side of us often. You really see us going onstage being fierce and confident and dancing upbeat, but this record, you really get a closer look at who we are.

— Ally Brooke, Billboard

== Composition and lyrics ==
A midtempo song built on a moderate tropical, dembow rhythm, "Don't Say You Love Me" is a torch song that finds the group asking for an honest relationship. The lyrics are constructed in the traditional verse-chorus form. The chorus, sung in an emotive tone, is first performed by Lauren Jauregui who introduces the song over a melancholic acoustic guitar; as Abby Jones of Billboard commented, Jauregui serenades a "close but inconsistent" lover on her verses. As the song progresses, a syncopated drum-line appears; the pre-chorus features Dinah Jane "pleasing for something more" as AXS's Lucas Villa pointed out. The beat drops during the chorus giving space to Normani Kordei.

After the second verse performed by Brooke, the song enters into a crescendo with the members singing in higher vocal registers. Allan Raible of ABC News noted that it is a song that relies more on "emotional heft over stereotypical sass." Stereogum's Chris DeVille described it as a "melancholy jam" that communicates "real warmth and tenderness." Dannii Ceniceros from BuzzFeed called the song a "steady-tempo empowerment reached song."

== Critical reception ==
Entertainment Weekly's Marc Sneticker felt the song shows off their "vocal excellence when allowed some breathing room." Brittany Spanos of Rolling Stone cited "Don't Say You Love Me" - along with "Make You Mad" - as one of the album's most "infectious jams" which they assert themselves in romantic relationships. Mike Nied from Idolator wrote that "Don't Say You Love Me" "sets the scene" for one of the group's most "tender" vocal performances. MTV News's Ross McNeilage named it a "brilliant song" further opining that "Don't Say You Love Me" helps the album to be their most "cohesive and fully released body of work. Gerrick Kennedy from Los Angeles Times called it a "road trip song where you’re looking at mountains and lakes. It gets you in your feelings."

Michael Cragg of The Guardian criticized the Fifth Harmony album but highlighted "Don’t Say You Love Me" as one of the stand-out tracks.

== Music video ==
The video ends with each member leaving the room through a door that remains open as the last member leaves. This symbolic scene was interpreted as a sign that they might possibly return. Diana Samsom of Music Times website called this scene the most "memorable and symbolic" part of the music video.

The music video for "Don't Say You Love Me" was directed by P. R. Brown. The video was previewed through a picture posted on Fifth Harmony's social media accounts showing the silhouettes of the group standing in front of a window in a dark room on March 29, 2018. The video was released as a farewell before they went into an indefinite hiatus following their final live performance at the Seminole Hard Rock Hotel & Casino in Florida on May 11, 2018.

Shot in an abandoned warehouse, the video features the members singing their respectives parts in individual locations wearing long dresses and gowns. Jauregui and Jane are seen in light-colored outfits while Kordei and Brooke appear in dark dresses. Lindsey Thompson of Teen Vogue magazine found a symbology behind their visual noting that the dark dresses give the feeling of "a somber tone", while the light outfits evoke the theme of "renewal or rebirth." In one particular camera shot they eventually come together and hold hands forming a circle. In the conclusion of the video each member one-by-one exits the room, (while Brooke is still singing) starting with Kordei, followed by Jane, then Jauregui, and finally Brooke who is the last one to leave the room. As she leaves, the door is left open.

=== Reception ===
Digital Spy's writer Joe Anderton praised the video as "suitably melancholic", with the members "posing against walls in a tatty building looking all moody and doing basic armography to let you know this is Serious Stuff." Megan Mann of the Salute magazine commented that the video was "beautiful in its simplicity." She also found several parallels between the video for "Don't Say You Love Me" and that of the Spice Girls' “Goodbye" (1998). As Mann perceived, the video ends the same way: with the four members linking arms before closing the door. For Abby Jones who described the visual as "dramatic" in his written article published on Billboard website, the group is "angelic" in their gowns. As of February 2024, the music video has achieved over 71 million views on YouTube.

== Live performances ==
Fifth Harmony first performed "Don't Say You Love Me" live during their appearance on MTV's reboot of Total Request Live alongside "He Like That" on October 27, 2017. The performance marked a change of scenery for TRL live performances, with the group singing in the studio instead of on a stage set up in Times Square, which was where the bulk of performers were situated in the first week. Billboard's Caitlin Kelley wrote positively about their vocal performance and synchronized harmonization. Similarly, Mike Wass of Idolator felt that their vocals were "on point". They also performed in February 2018 on Hollywood Boulevard to a small crowd of fans.

On their PSA Tour, the song was performed in a stripped-down setting in a similar vein to the music video, different to the majority of the other performed songs on the tour which included dedicated choreography.

== Credits and personnel ==
Credits adapted from Fifth Harmony's liner notes.

Recording

- Recorded at Windmark Studios, Los Angeles, California and Sole Studios, London, England.
- Mixed at Callanwolde Fine Arts Center, Atlanta, California.
- Mastered at Larrebe Studios North Hollywood, California.

Personnel

- Vocals – Ally Brooke Hernandez, Dinah Jane Hansen, Lauren Jauregui, Normani Kordei Hamilton
- Instruments – Jeremy Reeves, Johnathan Yip, Ray McCullough, Ray Romulus
- Producer, Programmed By – The Electric, Ian Kirkpatrick
- Recorded By – Bart Schoudel
- Written-By – Ian Kirkpatrick, Edvard Førre Erfjord, Lisa Scinta, Henrik Barman Michaelsen, Nate Cyphert
- Engineer [Additional And Assistant] – Bill Zimmerman
- Mixed By – Phil Tan, Bill Zimmerman
- Mastered by - Emerson Mancini
