= Angel (Fifth Harmony song) =

2017 promotional single by Fifth Harmony

Promotional single by Fifth Harmony

from the album Fifth Harmony
- Released: August 10, 2017
- Studio: Record Plant (Los Angeles, CA)
- Genre: Hip hop; trap
- Length: 3:09
- Label: Epic; Syco
- Songwriters: Sonny Moore; Jason Boyd
- Producers: Poo Bear; Skrillex

Fifth Harmony singles chronology
"Down" (2017)	"Angel" (2017)	"He Like That" (2017)

Music video
- "Fifth Harmony - Angel" on YouTube

"Angel" is a song recorded by American girl group Fifth Harmony for their self-titled third studio album (2017). The song was written and produced by Skrillex and Poo Bear. It was released as the first promotional single from the record on August 10, 2017.

== Composition ==
"Angel" was described by Mike Wass from Idolator writing that it finds the group veering "deep into hip hop territory." Its production is supported by heavy bassline, drum machine sound, "squiggly synths" and distorted vocal samples. The song is about being in a relationship based on unrealistic expectations. As MTV News's writer Madeline Roth commented, the group are "warning that they have no problem shrugging off a fuckboy if it needs to be." The group delivers a half-rapped performance on the first and second verses of the song, while in the chorus, they raise a rhetorical question: "When you look at me, what do you see? / Open your eyes, I’m more brilliant than you’ll ever be / Who said I was an angel?” The group continue to ask the same question throughout the record, as Rachael Ellenbogen from International Business Times commented.

== Critical reception ==
Sadie Bell from Billboard considered "Angel" as a "different direction" for the group describing it as "a bit harder than their more recent releases." Madeline Roth of MTV News praised its production and felt that "Angel" is "less poppier" than Fifth Harmony's previous single "Down", providing a "harder backdrop for their brassiness."

== Music video ==
The music video for "Angel" was directed by David Camarena and was released on August 11, 2017. The clip opens in a dimly lit setting, featuring a man who is dreaming, then it features the group in an entirely new light, in which they are revealed to be the subject of the man's dream, tormenting those of someone who has wronged them, complete with flashing images and dark VCR filters and neon lighting aesthetics.

== Charts ==
Chart (2017)	Peak position
New Zealand Heatseekers (RMNZ)	4
Philippines (Philippine Hot 100)	100
Portugal (AFP)	94
Scottish Singles Sales (Official Charts)	88
Spain (Promusicae)	42
US Bubbling Under Hot 100 (Billboard)	12
