= Fifth Harmony (album) =

Studio album by Fifth Harmony
- Released: August 25, 2017
- Recorded: 2017
- Studio: Windmark Recording (Santa Monica, California)
- Genres: Pop; hip hop; R&B
- Length: 33:03
- Labels: Epic; Syco
- Producers: Ammo; DallasK; Poo Bear; Skrillex; Tommy Brown; Anthony M. Jones; The Monsters and the Strangerz; The Stereotypes; Dreamlab; Ester Dean; Ian Kirkpatrick

Fifth Harmony chronology
7/27 (2016)	Fifth Harmony (2017)

Singles from Fifth Harmony
- 1. "Down" Released: June 2, 2017; 2. "He Like That" Released: September 19, 2017

Fifth Harmony is the third and final studio album by American girl group Fifth Harmony, released on August 25, 2017, through Syco Music and Epic Records. The band's only album not to feature Camila Cabello, who left in December 2016 to pursue a solo career, its lyrics discuss themes of female empowerment, confidence, love and unity. After having few to no writing credits on their previous two studio albums, the group assumed creative control over their third album and co-wrote half of its songs. The album features a guest appearance by rapper Gucci Mane and collaborations with several notable producers such as Ammo, who contributed to their 2016 smash hit "Work from Home", along with Poo Bear and Skrillex.

The lead single, "Down", which features Mane, was released on June 2, 2017, and received a gold certification in the United States. The second single, "He Like That", was released on digital and streaming platforms on September 19, 2017. As did the band's previous releases, the sound of Fifth Harmony is characterized primarily as pop and R&B and includes influences from other genres, including hip hop, tropical house, reggae, dancehall, synthpop and trap music; it was described as "versatile". "Angel" was released as the first promotional single on August 10, 2017. The group also released a music video for "Don't Say You Love Me" on May 18, 2018, as a goodbye note after their hiatus.

Some critics noted Cabello's absence, as well as a resemblance between Fifth Harmony and the band's previous album 7/27 (2016). Fifth Harmony debuted at number four on the US Billboard 200 chart, selling 46,000 copies in its first week and becoming Fifth Harmony's fourth top-ten entry and third top-five entry. It also debuted inside the top tens of several countries, including Canada, New Zealand, Ireland and the United Kingdom; in Mexico, it debuted at number three and in Spain, it debuted at number one.

Fifth Harmony remains the group's final album as following its release, the band went on hiatus so that the members could pursue solo careers. The album was promoted with the PSA Tour between September 2017 and May 2018.

== Background and conception ==
In 2016, Fifth Harmony released their second studio album, which is titled 7/27. To promote the album, they embarked on the 7/27 Tour. During an interview with radio host Elvis Duran after an iHeartRadio Jingle Ball concert, the group announced they were working on a new album. On December 18, 2016, they announced on social media that Camila Cabello had left Fifth Harmony. Following the repercussion of Cabello's departure and speculations about the group's future, the members published another statement saying, "We have spent the past year and a half (since her initial solo endeavor) trying to communicate to her and her team all of the reasons why we felt Fifth Harmony deserved at least one more album of her time. We are excited for our future, and we can't wait for what the new year brings."

In January 2017, the group renewed their contract with Epic Records as a quartet; the same month they announced the Asian leg of the 7/27 Tour and made their first appearance as a four-piece at the 43rd People's Choice Awards on January 18. During the show, they performed an edited version of "Work from Home" and won the award for "Favorite Group" for the second consecutive year. During an interview with Billboard, member Ally Brooke said the group were having "a lot of creative control and input" for the first time and that they "are so excited" about it. On April 12, 2017, the quartet appeared on the cover of Galore magazine, in which they discussed the concept and sonority present on their third album: "We've been creating sounds that we've been wanting to touch base on. Some R&B tones, some rhythmic tones. It's been amazing to create with one another because we're so different when it comes to music", Dinah Jane said. She added, "We love different genres. So to vibe together and create this Fifth Harmony sound is what makes it so special."

== Writing and recording ==
"The very exciting thing about going into this album is that we know the story we want to tell. We draw from our personal experiences. We've been in the studio, and we've had a lot of creative control. And through that, we've been able to co-write more than half of our album. It was an amazing process to have that creative freedom. It's great to put in our voices and our words on this album."

— Ally Brooke about their songwriting experience for Fifth Harmony

The recording sessions for Fifth Harmony began in China in 2017. During the creative process, the members had more involvement than with their previous albums, co-writing most of the songs, choosing which ones to produce and sharing ideas during the production. The group collaborated with several record producers and songwriters, including The Stereotypes, Skrillex, The Monsters and the Strangerz, Ammo DallasK, and Tommy Brown. According to Lauren Jauregui, those collaborators created "safe spaces" where they could try out ideas without being judged. In an interview with Official Charts Company, Dinah Jane said the producers knew what the group were going to do and respected their ideas and decisions. She added, "We're all in an environment where we can creatively open up to each other and not be afraid. There are no boundaries, and that comes through in the music. We've taken risks."

During the writing process, the group worked in pairs; each pair stayed in a room with a producer and songwriter. They could listen to the process of the songs then brainstorm ideas for the lyrics. Producer Leah Haywood of production team Dreamlab told Billboard, "It's not like [the group] came in at the end and started riffing. We sat and wrote verses together, because they're empowered women who want to be pushing the agenda." The group first hinted at the studio album with Skrillex and Poo Bear in March 2017; according to Poo Bear they were "hungry and excited and seemed like they had a serious new point to prove". The songs were written at Windmark Recording Studios.

== Composition ==
=== Music and lyrics ===
"With this album, we're really experimenting with kind of a lot different sounds. We got some strong pop melodies but there's also very dark urban sound as well as some flavor and some R&B flares. It really is pretty versatile and it's a wide range, you hear different elements in this album more than ever before. We’ve definitely reached a point where we're so involved that we're proud of what we're doing and we're really connected in a way that I don't feel we have been before."

— Ally Brooke and Lauren Jauregui on the album's sound and production.

Fifth Harmony consists mostly of R&B and pop songs that include elements of tropical house and hip hop music on its beats and productions. The melodies on the album are diverse and include uptempo songs and emotional ballads. It explores a diversity of music genres, including trap music, Rnbass, dancehall and reggae. Matt Collar from AllMusic wrote that the album picks up on the "slick, electronic vibe of 7/27 with a focus on songs for grown-ups". The lyrical content has been described as "genuine" and "authentic" in comparison with their previous works, in which the group felt a lack of creative fulfillment. Although the album's songs talk about love, womanhood and sexual empowerment—themes explored in their previous albums—Fifth Harmony also explores an emotional and personal zone; the group also sing about heartbreak and fragility. In an interview for Zach Sang, Lauren Jauregui commented; "we're much more connected to [this album] because we were able to be part of it. All of the songs that we didn't particularly write ourselves, we curated, we chose for this project." The album contains 10 tracks and runs for thirty-three minutes; shorter and with fewer songs than their previous albums that also had additional deluxe editions.

=== Songs and lyrical content ===
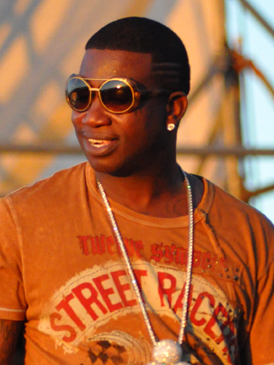
Gucci Mane (pictured) is the only collaboration on the album.

The first two tracks, "Down" and "He Like That", demonstrates the presence of the tropical sonority on the album. "Down" is a dancehall-influenced song that uses snare drums, synthesizers and percussion. It contains an additional verse rapped by Gucci Mane during the bridge; it is the only track on the album that includes a guest appearance. Although "Down" is about a romantic relationship, Normani said the group "kind of connect with each other because we've been through so much and we've always held each other 'Down'. " Time editor Raisa Bruner called it a "party anthem" that gives "each singer a chance to stretch her voice over a spare and addictive beat". "He Like That" is built on a bass guitar groove. It has a danceable beat that exhibits influences from reggae and urban music styles. The track's lyrics praise a seductive male figure, describing his characteristics and the characteristics that make him sexually attractive using an interpolation from MC Hammer's "Pumps and a Bump" during the pre-chorus and bridge. "Sauced Up" merges trap and synthpop elements before moving into a pop chorus that Chris DeVille from Stereogum website described as "bright" and "gargantuan". The song is characterized by use of a heavy bassline, synthesized finger snaps and synths pairing around its beats. Described as a "party anthem", "Sauced Up" alludes to socialization at parties and includes references to alcoholism in lines such as "blame it on drunk love" and "cause when I get sauced up I be like, so what".

The track "Make You Mad" contains lyrics about female sexual empowerment and breakups; Chris Willman from Variety said the track is not about "making a guy angry" but making "him mad with desire". A tropical-tinged song, "Make You Mad" fuses electronic music with a Caribbean flavor, using a predominant synthesized marimba sound, steelpan drums and a synth-line. The retro-styled fifth track "Deliver" is a throwback to 1990s R&B; its production incorporates influences of soul and gospel genres and modern, trap-inflected beats. The sonority of the track bears a resemblance to Mariah Carey's musical style, and uses a backing piano riff and soft vocal harmonies. Lyrically, "Deliver" conveys a sexual vibe with Fifth Harmony singing about express feelings to a man confessing he knows and appreciates their devotion to him. Thematically, it is one of the songs in the album that shows the group's typical empowerment themes in favor of a comfort with a partner.

Described as a "rocker-reggae" song, "Lonely Night" uses progressive guitar chords; it is constructed on a transitive musical dynamic with a beat that drops during the chorus, similar to that of "Make You Mad". Its lyrical content is about "giving a guy a breakdown of what you need from him [to be] with him". Dinah Jane said; " 'Lonely Night' is something about your man—you're basically warning him, like, 'If you try to do this, just know that you're going to have to have a lonely night. And if you want me, you're going to have to do this to have me, to keep me.'" "Don't Say You Love Me" and "Messy" are mid-tempo ballads that explores a vulnerable side of the group; the former is a melancholic torch song that asks for an honest relationship over an "island" dembow rhythm and a melodic acoustic guitar. The song is performed in an emotive tone and runs through a moderate drumbeat. Entertainment Weekly's Marc Sneticker said it shows off the group's "vocal excellence when allowed some breathing room". "Messy" is a classic pop and R&B ballad with a vulnerable lyrical content. It shows Fifth Harmony's members exploring their own complexities and fragility. According to Ally Brooke, "Messy" expresses the group "just us as people, as humans, as women"; she commented, "We have a lot in ourselves, and it's a beautiful part of us and who we are, and the music fits perfectly with it. It's so magical." Normani compared its aesthetic to that of The Pussycat Dolls's song "Stickwitu".

"Angel" distinguish itself from the rest of the album sonically and lyrically. Its "sparse" trap production features pitched-shifted vocal synths, distorted effects, heavy bass and double hi-hat rolls. The song is about being in a relationship based on unrealistic expectations, shattering a false "angelical" image created by an abusive partner. The group delivers a rapped performance during the first and second verses. "Bridges" was described as a moment of "unity" on the album. Expressing a message of positivity, the track delivers a tone of political criticism as a response to Donald Trump's immigration policy and saying it is necessary to build "bridges instead of walls", making a clear reference to the Executive Order 13767 that directs the building of a wall along the Mexico–United States border. "Bridges" uses electric guitar, clicks, percussive drums and a hand-clapped rhythm. In an interview with Jason Lipshutz of Billboard, Dinah Jane stated that the group wanted to create a song about contemporary social issues, saying, "It's definitely a message that needs to be shared out there into the world. Something we wanted to share with everybody and let them know is that we know love can conquer hate."

== Release and promotion ==
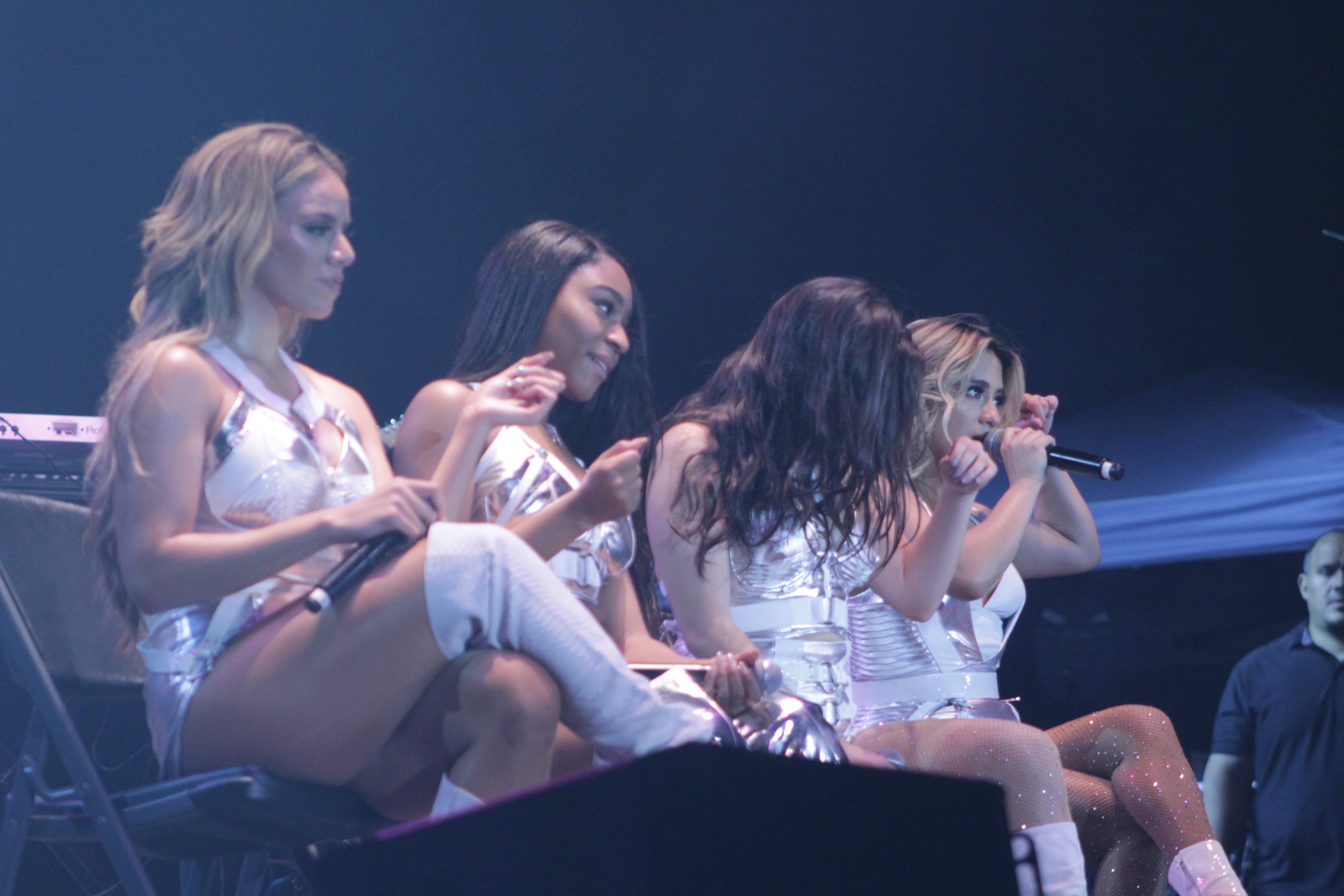
Fifth Harmony performing at the Los Angeles Country Fair 2017 event on September 15, 2017.

On July 24, 2017, Fifth Harmony performed "Down" on The Tonight Show with Jimmy Fallon, during which the host Fallon announced the album's title and release date. Buyers who pre-ordered the album online received exclusive access to autograph-signing events for the album in Fullerton, California, on August 14 and in San Francisco on August 15. Another signing event was held at Hard Rock Cafe in New York City on August 29, 2017. Coinciding with the album release date, the group appeared at a live event promoted by the Vevo team that was held in Hollywood's NeueHouse. During the conversation, the music video for "He Like That" was premiered for streaming. On August 27, 2017, the group appeared at the 2017 MTV Video Music Awards where they performed "Angel" and "Down"—the latter song featured an appearance by Gucci Mane.

For online marketing, Fifth Harmony's Twitter account announced three challenges that fans could complete to unlock hidden videos by accumulating enough save and stream data for the album on Spotify. Fans could track the challenge's progress on the group's website. A video showing the making of the official music videos for "Angel" and "He Like That", and a video in which the group documented the creative process for their VMAs performance were unlocked. The group later appeared on Good Morning America on August 29, 2017, where they sang "He Like That" and talked about their performance at the VMAs. Fifth Harmony appeared on The Late Late Show with James Corden on September 12, 2017, where they performed songs and participated in a game called Flinch. On September 29, the girls embarked on their PSA Tour to promote the album.

== Tour ==
PSA Tour
- Tour by Fifth Harmony
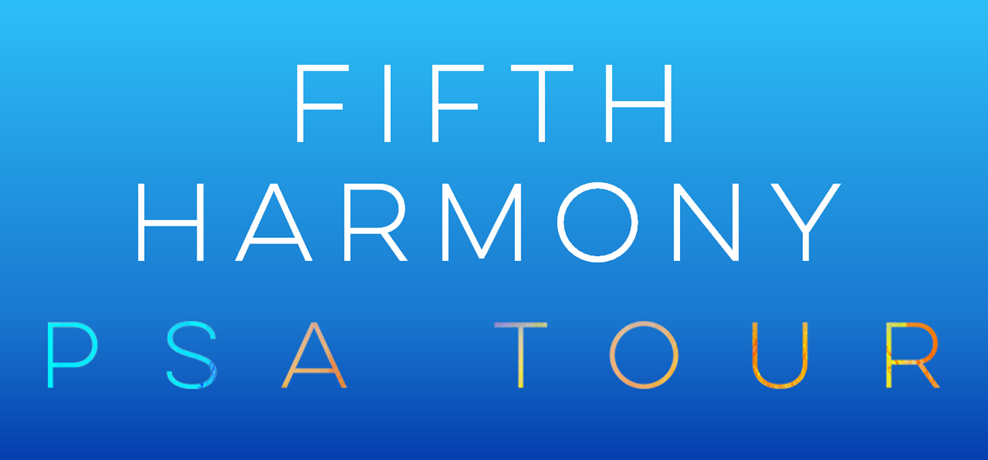
- Logo for the tour
- Location: Asia; North America; South America
- Associated album: Fifth Harmony
- Start date: September 29, 2017
- End date: May 11, 2018
- Legs: 4
- No. of shows: 21

Fifth Harmony concert chronology
- The 7/27 Tour (2016–17); PSA Tour (2017–18); N/A

On August 9, 2017, Fifth Harmony announced their sixth concert tour, titled PSA Tour, to promote the album. It began on September 29, 2017, in Santiago, Chile, at the Movistar Arena and ended on May 11, 2018, at the Hard Rock Event Center in Hollywood, Florida. Becky G was announced as a supporting act for some of the Latin American dates and the Lost Kings were planned to support the group in Australia but the Australian concerts were canceled. The tour's setlist included all ten songs from the album and several songs from the group's previous albums.

=== Set list ===
This set list is representative of the concert on September 29, 2017, in Santiago. It does not represent all concerts for the duration of the tour.

1. "Worth It"
2. "Boss"
3. "Sauced Up"
4. "Reflection"
5. "Deliver"
6. "Messy"
7. "Make You Mad"
8. "Scared of Happy"
9. "Lonely Night"
10. "Not That Kinda Girl"
11. "Angel"
12. "No Way"
13. "Down"
14. "All in My Head (Flex)"
15. "He Like That"
16. "Don't Say You Love Me"
17. "Work from Home"
  Encore
18. "Bridges"

=== Shows ===
List of 2017 concerts
Date (2017)	City	Country	Venue	Attendance	Revenue
September 29	Santiago	Chile	Movistar Arena	4,877 / 11,282	$351,458
October 2	Buenos Aires	Argentina	Luna Park	3,262 / 8,191	$270,608
October 4	Belo Horizonte	Brazil	BH Hall	2,467 / 5,160	$159,570
October 6	Rio de Janeiro	Brazil	Metropolitan	5,062 / 8,404	$330,769
October 7 (Note: The show was a part of the VillaMix Festival 2017.)	São Paulo	Brazil	Estádio do Morumbi	—N/a	—N/a
October 10	Mexico City	Mexico	Auditorio Nacional	6,130 / 9,620	$330,505
October 11	Monterrey	Mexico	Arena Monterrey	—N/a	—N/a
October 12	Zapopan	Mexico	Telmex Auditorium	2,576 / 4,867	$148,948
October 14	Panama City	Panama	Figali Convention Center	1,163 / 3,200	$100,351
October 15	Alajuela	Costa Rica	Coca-Cola Amphitheater	1,482 / 3,400	$91,358

List of 2018 concerts
Date (2018)	City	Country	Venue	Attendance	Revenue
February 26	Osaka	Japan	Zepp Osaka Bayside	—N/a	—N/a
February 28	Tokyo	Japan	Toysou Pit	—N/a	—N/a
March 1	Tokyo	Japan	Toysou Pit	—N/a	—N/a
March 2	Nagoya	Japan	Zepp Nagoya	—N/a	—N/a
March 5	Bangkok	Thailand	Muangthai GMM Live House	—N/a	—N/a
March 6	Quezon City	Philippines	Kia Theatre	—N/a	—N/a
March 12	Jakarta	Indonesia	The Kasablanka	—N/a	—N/a
March 14	Singapore		Zepp@Big Box	—N/a	—N/a
March 16	Abu Dhabi	United Arab Emirates	du Forum	—N/a	—N/a
March 18 (Note: The show was a part of Universal Studios' Mardi Gras 2018.)	Orlando	United States	Universal Music Plaza Stage	—N/a	—N/a
May 11	Hollywood	United States	Hard Rock Event Center	—N/a	—N/a
Total				27,019 / 54,124 (50%)	$1,783,567

=== Canceled shows ===
Date	City	Country	Venue	Reason
October 24, 2017	Perth	Australia	Perth Arena	Change in scheduling
November 3, 2017 (Note: The show would be a part of the KFC Edgefest 2017.)	Christchurch	New Zealand	Horncastle Arena	Unforeseen scheduling issues
November 4, 2017	Wellington	New Zealand	TSB Bank Arena	Unforeseen scheduling issues
November 5, 2017	Auckland	New Zealand	Spark Arena	Unforeseen scheduling issues
March 8, 2018 (Note: The Melbourne, Sydney and Brisbane concerts were originally planned to be set on October 27, 28, and November 1, 2017, respectively, but were postponed to March 2018 due to "change in scheduling". The Sydney concert would be realocated from the ICC Theatre to the Hordern Pavilion. They ended up being ultimately canceled.)	Melbourne	Australia	Margaret Court Arena	Scheduling requirements
March 9, 2018	Sydney	Australia	Hordern Pavilion	Scheduling requirements
March 10, 2018	Brisbane	Australia	Brisbane Convention Centre	Scheduling requirements

== Singles ==
The lead single from Fifth Harmony, "Down", was released to all major streaming services and digital platforms on June 2, 2017. It debuted at its peak position of number 42 on the U.S. Billboard Hot 100 and reached the top fifties of charts in other countries, including the UK, Ireland, Canada, France, Portugal and Slovakia. The accompanying music video for "Down" premiered on Fifth Harmony's Vevo channel on June 8, 2017. The video was directed by James Larese; it has a neon-inspired aesthetic interspersed with clips of the group performing a choreographed dance. Its music video earned Fifth Hamony their fourth MTV Video Music Award at the 2017 ceremony for Best Pop Video.

"He Like That" was released as the second single from the album; it was released to mainstream radio in the U.S. on September 19, 2017. The official video for "He Like That" was released on the group's Vevo channel on August 25, 2017.

The album's third single was "Por Favor"—a duet with Pitbull—was released on October 27, 2017. The song was later included on the album's Spotify re-release. Fifth Harmony performed "Por Favor" on U.S. television several times, including on Dancing with the Stars, Showtime at the Apollo and at the 2017 Latin American Music Awards.

=== Promotional singles ===
"Angel" was released as the first promotional single from Fifth Harmony on August 10, 2017, with the pre-order of the album. It was produced by Skrillex and Poo Bear. Fifth Harmony performed part of the song at the VMAs before they performed their first single, "Down". The group released "Deliver" as the album's second promotional single on September 8. Its music video premiered the same day. The group performed the song that same month on Live with Kelly and Ryan, alongside their single "He Like That". On May 18, 2018, Fifth Harmony released the music video for "Don't Say You Love Me", having previously performed the song on Total Request Live alongside "He Like That".

== Critical reception ==
Professional ratings
Aggregate scores
Source	Rating
Metacritic	64/100
Review scores
Source	Rating
AllMusic	3/5 stars
Entertainment Weekly	B−
The New York Times	80/100
Idolator	3/5
Pitchfork	5.3/10
Rolling Stone	3.5/5 stars
Spin	6/10
The Guardian	3/5 stars

Fifth Harmony received generally positive reviews from music critics. Brittany Spanks from Rolling Stone called the album the group's "most cohesive album yet" and a "satisfying introduction to what Fifth Harmony can be capable of in their new era as a quartet". Marc Snetiker from Entertainment Weekly said the album echoes like a "B side" to their previous album 7/27 but delivers only "a faint aftershock of its quake". AllMusic's Matt Collar described the album as "sophisticated" and said its "undistinguished production" finds the group completing the transformation "from a youthful pop outfit into a mature, adult contemporary R&B entity". In a review for The Guardian, Michael Cragg wrote that the album simultaneously feels like "a statement of intent and a hastily cobbled together swansong", commending the album's divergence of sounds but regarding it "overall, a mixed bag".

Writing for The New York Times, Jon Caramanica praised Fifth Harmony, commenting that it is "potent and overflowing with sugary pleasures" and full of "military-grade pop production and laser-targeted singing". Idolator's Mike Nied called it "easily their most eclectic release" and "a statement from the quartet". In a mixed review, Katherine St. Asaph of Spin described it as a "workmanlike pop album, vocally immaculate and sonically au courant, but seldom more than functional", adding that the album is "so focused on functional, micromanaged pop tracks that it doesn't allow the women a personality besides 'vaguely, anonymously sassy' ".

== Commercial performance ==
Fifth Harmony debuted at number four on the US Billboard 200 chart, with 46,000 album-equivalent units according to Nielsen SoundScan. It reached the same peak as 7/27, making it Fifth Harmony's fourth consecutive top-ten and third top-five album, equaling the number of top-ten albums from all-female acts Destiny's Child and Dixie Chicks. They are only behind the Supremes, who achieved eight top-ten albums. In terms of sales, the album was the second-highest entry on the chart in the week of its debut, with 32,000 pure copies sold. The album spent four weeks on the Billboard 200 beginning at number 4 and descending to 34, 100 and 162 in each following week.

In South Korea, Fifth Harmony debuted at number 97 on the Gaon Album Chart and at number ten on the international chart for physical media copies. In Japan, the album debuted at number 70 on Billboard Japan's Hot Albums chart and peaked at number 51 in its fourth week. The album also debuted at number 33 on Billboard Japan Top Albums for estimated physical sales of 1,677 units. The album debuted at number 22 on the Oricon Daily Albums Chart on September 12, 2017, and peaked at number 19 a day later.

== Track listing ==
Standard edition
No.	Title	Writer(s)	Length
1.	"Down" (featuring Gucci Mane)	Joshua Coleman; Dallas Koehlke; Claire Demorest; Radric Davis	2:45
2.	"He Like That"	Coleman; Koehlke; Ester Dean; Dexter Ansley; Gerald Baillergeau; Ondreius Burgie; Stanley Burrell; George Clinton Jr.; Garry Shider; David Spradley; Frank Brim	3:37
3.	"Sauced Up"	Ally Brooke Hernandez; Dinah Jane; Lauren Jauregui; Normani Kordei; Harmony Samuels; Edgar Etienne; Varren Wade; Candace Shields; Ryan Toby	3:17
4.	"Make You Mad"	Hernandez; Jane; Jauregui; Kordei; Dan James; Leah Haywood; Rob Ellmore	2:54
5.	"Deliver"	Jonathan Yip; Jeremy Reeves; Ray Romulus; Ray McCullough; Taylor Parks; Whitney Phillips	3:26
6.	"Lonely Night"	Hernandez; Jane; Jauregui; Kordei; Jason Evigan; Dayo Alatunji; Jordan Johnson; Stefan Johnson; Marcus Lomax	3:25
7.	"Don't Say You Love Me"	Nate Cyphert; Ian Kirkpatrick; Henrik Barman Michaelsen; Edvard Forre Erfjord; Lisa Scinta	3:13
8.	"Angel"	Sonny John Moore; Jason Boyd	3:09
9.	"Messy"	Hernandez; Jane; Jauregui; Kordei; James; Haywood; Ellmore; Thomas Allen; Harold Brown; Orville Burrell; Morris Dickerson; Ricardo Ducent; Gerry Goldstein; Leroy Jordan; Lee Levitin; Charles Miller; Shaun Pizzonia; Howard Scott; Brian Thompson	3:14
10.	"Bridges"	Hernandez; Jane; Jauregui; Kordei; Thomas Brown; Anthony Jones; Sebastian Kole	4:03
Total length:			33:03

Spotify bonus track
No.	Title	Writer(s)	Length
11.	"Por Favor" (Spanglish version) (with Pitbull)	Adonis Shropshire; Alicia Keys; Armando Pérez; Barry White; Bilal Hajji; Jamie Sanderson; Jermaine Dupri; Jorge Gomez; José Carlos García; Madison Love; Manuel Lonnie Seal Jr.; Philip Kembo; Usher Raymond	3:18
Total length:			36:21

Japanese limited edition
No.	Title	Length
11.	"Down" (instrumental version)	2:43
Total length:		35:46

Notes

- Only digital versions of the album list Frank Brim as a co-writer for "He Like That".
- Dayo Olatunji is incorrectly credited as Dayo Alatunji.

Sample credits

- "He Like That" contains a portion of the composition "Pumps and a Bump", written by Dexter Ansley, Gerald Baillergeau, Ondreius Burgie, MC Hammer, George Clinton, Garry Shider and David Spradley, performed by MC Hammer.
- "Messy" contains a portion of the composition "It Wasn't Me", written by Shaggy, Rikrok, Shaun Pizzonia and Brian Thompson, performed by Shaggy featuring Rikrok, which interpolates "Smile Happy", performed by War, written by Thomas Allen, Harold Brown, Morris Dickerson, Leroy Jordan, Charles Miller, Lee Levitin, and Howard Scott.

== Credits and personnel ==
Credits adapted from the album's liner notes

- Ally Brooke Hernandez – vocals (all tracks)
- Dinah Jane – vocals (all tracks)
- Lauren Jauregui – vocals (all tracks)
- Normani Kordei – vocals (all tracks)
- Ammo – production (tracks 1, 2)
- DallasK – production (tracks 1, 2)
- Harmony Samuels – production (track 3)
- Dreamlab – production (tracks 4, 9)
- Ruffian – production (tracks 4, 9)
- The Stereotypes – production (track 5)
- The Monsters & Strangerz – production (track 6)
- Jason Evigan – production (track 6)
- Ian Kirkpatrick – production (track 7)
- The Electric – production (track 7)
- Skrillex – production (track 8)
- Poo Bear – production (track 8)
- Tommy Brown – production (track 10)
- Anthony Jones – production (track 10)
- Andrew Bolooki – vocal production (track 1)
- Chris "Tek" O'Ryan – vocal production (track 2)
- Ryan Toby – vocal production (track 3)
- Varren Wade – vocal production (track 3)
- Ester Dean – co-production (track 2)
- Tayla Parx – co-production (track 5)
- Whitney Phillips – co-production (track 5)
- Edgar "JV" Etienne – additional production (track 3)

== Charts ==
=== Weekly charts ===
Chart (2017)	Peak position
Australian Albums (ARIA)	9
Austrian Albums (Ö3 Austria)	41
Belgian Albums (Ultratop Flanders)	13
Belgian Albums (Ultratop Wallonia)	31
Canadian Albums (Billboard)	7
Czech Albums (ČNS IFPI)	61
Dutch Albums (Album Top 100)	11
Finnish Albums (Suomen virallinen lista)	40
French Albums (SNEP)	44
German Albums (Offizielle Top 100)	56
Irish Albums (IRMA)	6
Italian Albums (FIMI)	16
Japanese Albums (Oricon)	19
Japanese Albums (Billboard Japan)	51
Mexican Albums (AMPROFON)	3
New Zealand Albums (RMNZ)	7
Norwegian Albums (VG-lista)	19
Polish Albums (ZPAV)	30
Portuguese Albums (AFP)	2
Scottish Albums (Official Charts)	9
Slovak Albums (ČNS IFPI)	64
South Korean Albums (Gaon)	97
South Korean International Albums (Gaon)	10
Spanish Albums (Promusicae)	1
Swedish Albums (Sverigetopplistan)	21
Swiss Albums (Schweizer Hitparade)	28
UK Albums (Official Charts)	10
US Billboard 200	4

=== Year-end charts ===
Chart (2017)	Position
Mexican Albums (AMPROFON)	99

== Release history ==
Region	Date	Format	Label
Various	August 25, 2017	CD; digital download	Epic; Syco
Japan	September 13, 2017	CD	Sony Japan
