= Por Favor (song) =

Single by Pitbull and Fifth Harmony

from the album Fifth Harmony (reissue)
- Released: October 27, 2017
- Genre: Latin pop; pop rap
- Length: 3:19
- Label: Polo Grounds; Epic; RCA
- Songwriters: Armando C. Pérez; Jamie Sanderson; Philip Kembo; Madison Love; Usher Raymond; Alicia Keys; Jermaine Dupri; Adonis Shropshire; Manuel Seal; Barry White
- Producers: Sermstyle; Pip Kembo

Pitbull singles chronology
"Options" (2017)	"Por Favor" (2017)	"Jungle" (2017)

Fifth Harmony singles chronology
"He Like That" (2017)	"Por Favor" (2017)

Music video
- "Por Favor" on YouTube

"Por Favor" is a song by American rapper Pitbull and American girl group Fifth Harmony from the group's self-titled third studio album. The song was written by Pitbull, Madison Love, Sermstyle and Philip Kembo, and produced by the latter two. Additional writing credits were also given to Usher, Alicia Keys, Jermaine Dupri, Adonis Shropshire and Manuel Seal, as it contains a sample from the 2004 single "My Boo" by Usher and Keys, as well as Barry White since the latter song incorporated a melody from the 1977 song "He's All I've Got" by American female vocal trio Love Unlimited. The song was released on October 27, 2017, in two versions; a Spanish version, in which Lauren Jauregui and Ally Brooke are the main two contributors from the group heard on the song, and a Spanglish version, where all four members can be heard. The Spanglish version has been performed at the 2017 Latin American Music Awards, on the finale of Dancing with the Stars and on Showtime at the Apollo. Shortly after the single's release the Spanglish version was included on the Spotify re-release of the album, thus becoming its third official single and the final single released by the group prior to their indefinite hiatus, which began in 2018.

The original version of the song was also intended to be included on Pitbull's eleventh studio album Libertad 548 (released September 27, 2019), but it did not make the final tracklist. An additional full-English extended remix to the song, which was used for live performances by the artists, was released to DJ record pools and radios for airplay.

== Background and composition ==
"Por Favor" is a latin pop song that has elements of hip hop, reggaeton and urban contemporary. It runs for three minutes and nineteen seconds. Lyrically, it discusses self empowerment and your love for someone. It has had a Spanish version and a Spanglish version that have the same lyrical meaning but in different languages.

== Critical reception ==
Ross McNeilage from MTV said that the song is a "summer hit anthem during the winter time", similar to the time when the 2013 hit "Timber" was released. Mike Wass from Idolator said that "Mr. Worldwide shows his swagger" on the track and how "Fifth Harmony sing the killer vocal hooks and chorus on the track." Perri Konecky from PopSugar said that the track is a "banger", while calling it a "sexy song" and a "spanglish love letter", and that "it's a perfect jam for as to put on and dance to all weekend."

== Live performances ==
Pitbull and Fifth Harmony performed the song on the finale of the 25th season of Dancing with the Stars, and at the 2017 Latin American Music Awards, at the beginning of Pitbull's medley performance before accepting the Dick Clark Award for Excellence. On February 22, 2018, Pitbull performed "Por Favor" among a medley of hits at the Premio Los Nuestro 2018. The artists also performed the song on the first episode of the reboot of Showtime at the Apollo (first shown on 1 March 2018), as a remix featuring new English lyrics during the chorus.

== Music video ==
=== Background and reception ===
The music video for "Por Favor" was released on November 27, Mike Wass from Idolator said that, "It has been a busy year for both artists. Pit dropped his 10th LP, Climate Change, and is gearing up to release a greatest hits on December 1 — complete with a new single called 'Jungle'. As for Fifth Harmony, they released their self-titled third LP (their first as a quartet)." Ad of February 2024, the video has garnered over 35 million views.

=== Synopsis ===
Jeff Benjamin from FUSE represents the synopsis. "The video begins in a traditional Asian temple garden which then Pitbull wanders around, following a mysterious beauty in a red dress who ultimately has a surprise for him at their sensual dinner together. Meanwhile, the four ladies Lauren Jauregui, Ally Brooke, Dinah Jane and Normani Kordei deliver their verses in a red room, looking all sorts of fabulous." It then shows scenes where Pitbull is dancing with his date in a Washitsu where as still showing scenes at the dinner table. His date pulls out a note which shows the word "Dale!" which then leads into the conclusion of the night."

== Track listing ==
Streaming

No.	Title	Length
1.	"Por Favor"	3:19

Streaming – Spanglish version

No.	Title	Length
1.	"Por Favor" (Spanglish Version)	3:19

== Charts ==
=== Weekly charts ===
Chart (2017–2018)	Peak position
Mexico (Billboard Espanol Airplay)	33
Poland Dance (ZPAV)	25
Romania (Airplay 100)	12
US Hot Latin Songs (Billboard)	15
US Latin Airplay (Billboard)	24
US Latin Rhythm Airplay (Billboard)	12
Venezuela (National-Report)	39

=== Year-end charts ===
Chart (2017)	Position
Romania (Airplay 100)	49
