= Fifth Harmony =

American girl group

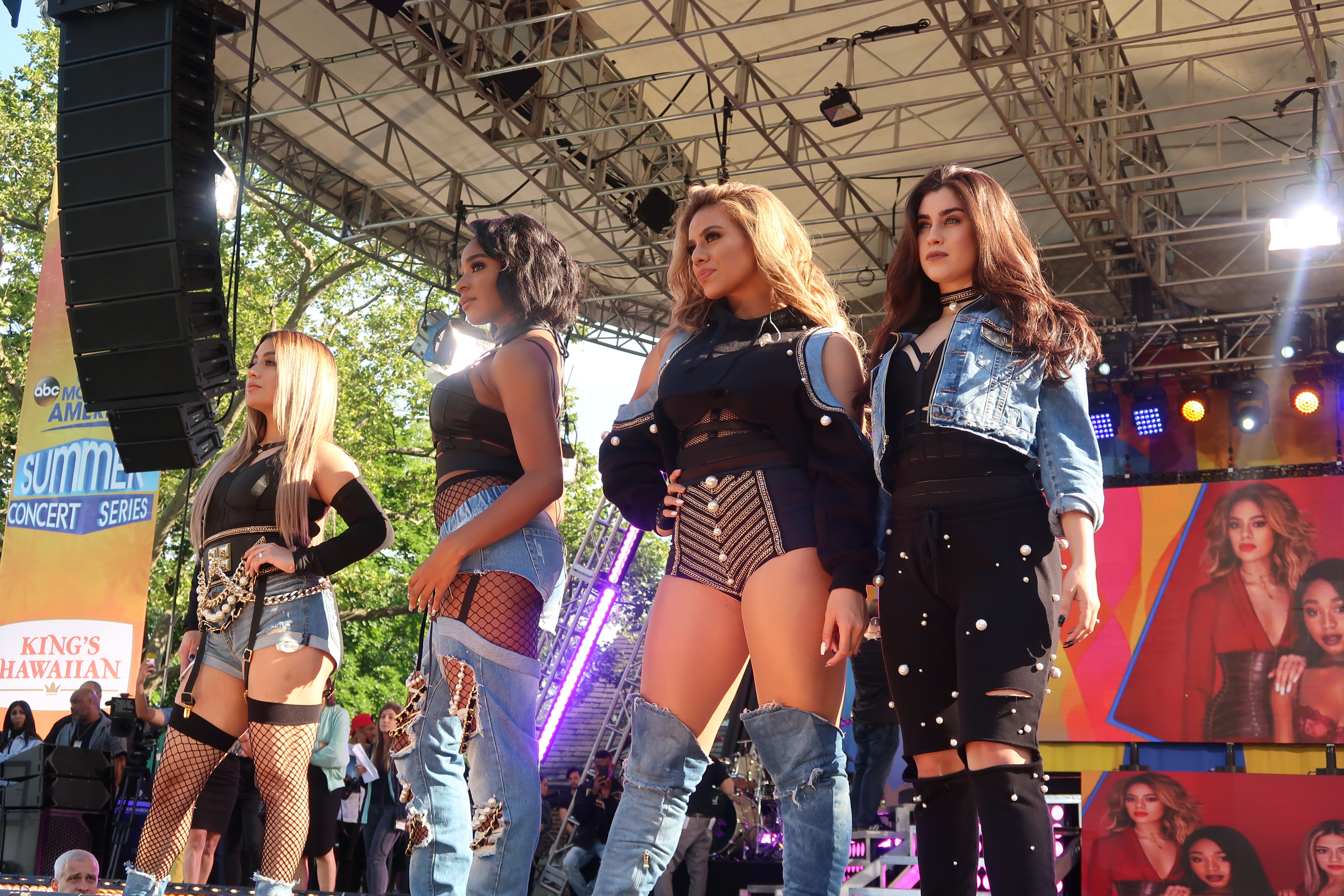
- Fifth Harmony performing as a quartet in 2017

Background information
- Also known as: 5H
- Origin: Miami, Florida, U.S.
- Genres: Pop; R&B
- Works: Discography; recorded songs
- Years active: 2012–2018; 2025
- Labels: Syco; Epic
- Members: Ally Brooke; Dinah Jane; Lauren Jauregui; Normani
- Past members: Camila Cabello
- Website: fifthharmony.com

Fifth Harmony, often shortened to 5H, were an American girl group based in Miami, composed of Ally Brooke, Normani, Dinah Jane, Lauren Jauregui, and formerly Camila Cabello until her departure from the group in December 2016. The group signed a joint record deal with Simon Cowell's label Syco Records and L.A. Reid's label Epic Records after forming and were the last contestant eliminated in the second season of the American singing competition series The X Factor in 2012.

The group released their debut single, "Miss Movin' On", preceding their extended play Better Together. In 2015, the group released their debut studio album, Reflection, which was certified gold by the Recording Industry Association of America (RIAA). It spawned the singles "Boss", "Sledgehammer" and "Worth It"; the latter of which was certified triple platinum by RIAA, and reached the top ten in thirteen countries. In 2016, the group released "Work from Home", the lead single from their second album 7/27, which peaked at number four on the Billboard Hot 100, making it the first top five single by a girl group in a decade on that chart. They released their self-titled third album in 2017. The group went on an indefinite hiatus in May 2018, allowing its members to pursue solo projects, with a one-off reunion performance in 2025.

Fifth Harmony has sold nearly 15 million RIAA certified units and are one of the best-selling girl groups of all time, with a reported 33 million copies sold. They are known for their vocal range and songs with themes of female empowerment, self positivity, confidence, and unity. As of 2016, they have earned 1.6 billion on-demand streams, according to Nielsen SoundScan. Billboard named them the biggest girl group of the 2010s. In 2017, Time referred to them as arguably "the biggest girl group in the world".

Fifth Harmony have earned the most top ten albums on the U.S. Billboard 200 for any girl group in the 21st century. Their accolades include an American Music Award, three MTV Europe Music Awards, three Guinness World Records, four MTV Video Music Awards, four iHeartRadio Music Awards, the first ever Billboard Women in Music Group of the Year award, a record five Nickelodeon Kids' Choice Awards (the most for a girl group), and ten Teen Choice Awards.

== Career ==
=== 2012: The X Factor ===
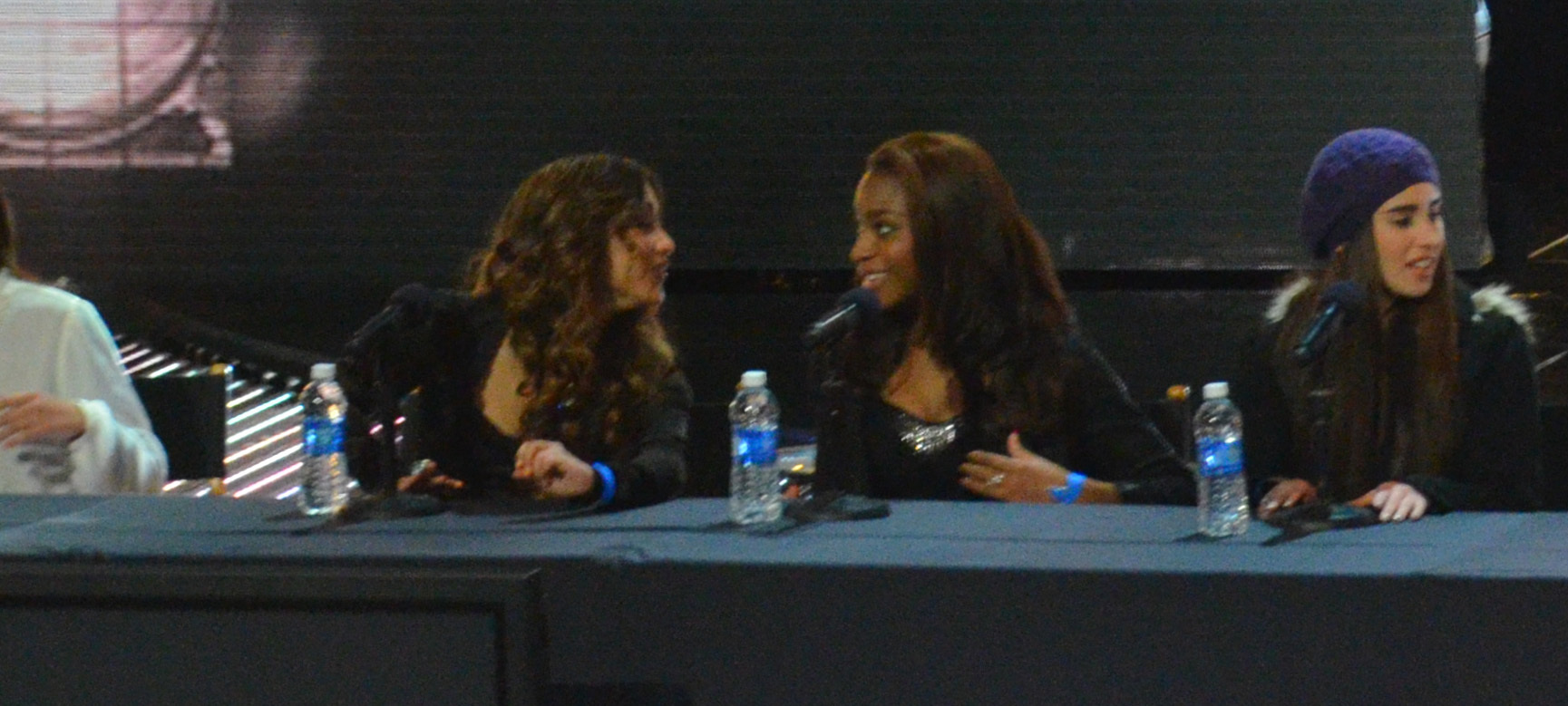
Fifth Harmony on set of The X Factor in December 2012

In 2012, Ally Brooke, Camila Cabello, Normani Kordei, Dinah Jane and Lauren Jauregui auditioned as soloists on the second season of the American televised singing competition The X Factor. The latter four failed to progress in the "Teens" category, with Brooke failing to enter the "Young Adults" category. However, they were later brought back and put together to form a five-piece girl group at The Fillmore, in Miami, Florida on July 27, thus qualifying for the "Groups" category. Judges Demi Lovato, L.A. Reid, Britney Spears and Simon Cowell helped form the group. For their qualifying song at the "judges' houses", and their first song as a group, the girls sang an acoustic version of "Impossible" by Shontelle. Afterwards, Marc Anthony called the performance "unbelievable" with Cowell sharing similar sentiments saying that they were "clearly one great group". Initially, the group's name was "Lylas" (an acronym for Love You Like a Sister), but another group called "The Lylas" (which consists of four of Bruno Mars' sisters) claimed that the show stole their name. Thereafter, Lylas changed their name to 1432 (a colloquial term for I Love You Too), which was announced on the first live show on October 31, during which 1432 performed "We Are Never Ever Getting Back Together" by Taylor Swift. Cowell and Reid were critical of the new name, and Cowell suggested that the group be renamed again. During the first live results show on November 1, 1432 performed "Skyscraper" by Demi Lovato in a sing-off with three-piece girl group Sister C. Cowell decided to send 1432 through to the Top 12 and announced that they would be renamed via the viewers online. The name chosen by the public was announced: "Fifth Harmony".

In the semi-finals stage of the show, the group performed Ellie Goulding's "Anything Could Happen" as well as "Impossible" for the second time during the competition. However, their performance of "Impossible" received mostly negative reviews from the judges because the group had previously performed the song at Cowell's home (although not on The X Factor concert stage). Three members of the group (Camila, Lauren, and Ally) sang parts of the song in fluent Spanish. The following night's public vote results advanced Fifth Harmony to the final three along with Tate Stevens and Carly Rose Sonenclar. On the Top three live show, Fifth Harmony performed "Anything Could Happen" for the second time as their "Song of the Series" song. Their second song was a duet with The X Factor judge Demi Lovato singing "Give Your Heart a Break". Their final song of the night (and their last on the show) was "Let It Be" by the Beatles, billed as their "$5 million song". After the first round of the finals, they did not receive enough votes from the public to advance to the Top two on December 20, 2012.

The X Factor performances and results
Show	Theme	Song					Order	Result
Show	Theme	Dinah Jane Hansen	Lauren Jauregui	Ally Brooke	Normani Hamilton	Camila Cabello	Order	Result
Auditions	Free choice	"If I Were a Boy"	"If I Ain't Got You"	"On My Knees"	"Chain of Fools"	"Respect"	—N/a	Through to bootcamp
Bootcamp 1	Free choice	"Hero"	"E.T."	"Somebody That I Used to Know"	"If I Ain't Got You"	"Back to Black"	—N/a	Through to bootcamp 2
Bootcamp 2	Group performance	Not aired					—N/a	Through to bootcamp 3
Bootcamp 3	Duet performance	"Stronger (What Doesn't Kill You)" (with Diamond White)	"These Arms of Mine" (with Sister C)	"Knockin' on Heaven's Door" (with Julia Bullock)	"What Makes You Beautiful" (with Arin Ray)	"Your Song" (with Jordan Shane)	—N/a	Regrouped/through to judges' houses
Judges' houses	Free choice	"Impossible"					—N/a	Through to live shows
Week 1	Made in America	"We Are Never Ever Getting Back Together"					13	Bottom two
Week 1	Sing-off	"Skyscraper"					8	Saved by Simon Cowell
Week 2	Songs from Movies	"A Thousand Years"					13	Safe (5th)
Week 3	Divas	"Hero"					8	Safe (6th)
Week 4	Giving Thanks	"I'll Stand by You"					6	Safe (7th)
Week 5	Number-ones	"Stronger (What Doesn't Kill You)"					4	Safe (4th)
Week 6	Unplugged	"Set Fire to the Rain"					4	Bottom three
Week 6	Pepsi Challenge songs	"Give Your Heart a Break"					10	Bottom three
Final Showdown (Week 6)	Free choice	"Anytime You Need a Friend"					1	Saved by judges' vote (4th)
Semi-final	Contestant's choice	"Anything Could Happen"					4	Safe (2nd)
Semi-final	No theme	"Impossible"					8	Safe (2nd)
Final	Favourite performance	"Anything Could Happen"					3	Eliminated
Final	Celebrity duet	"Give Your Heart a Break" (with Demi Lovato)					6	Eliminated
Final	Winner's song	"Let It Be"					9	Eliminated
Final	Christmas song	"Christmas (Baby Please Come Home)"					2	Eliminated

=== 2013–2014: Better Together ===
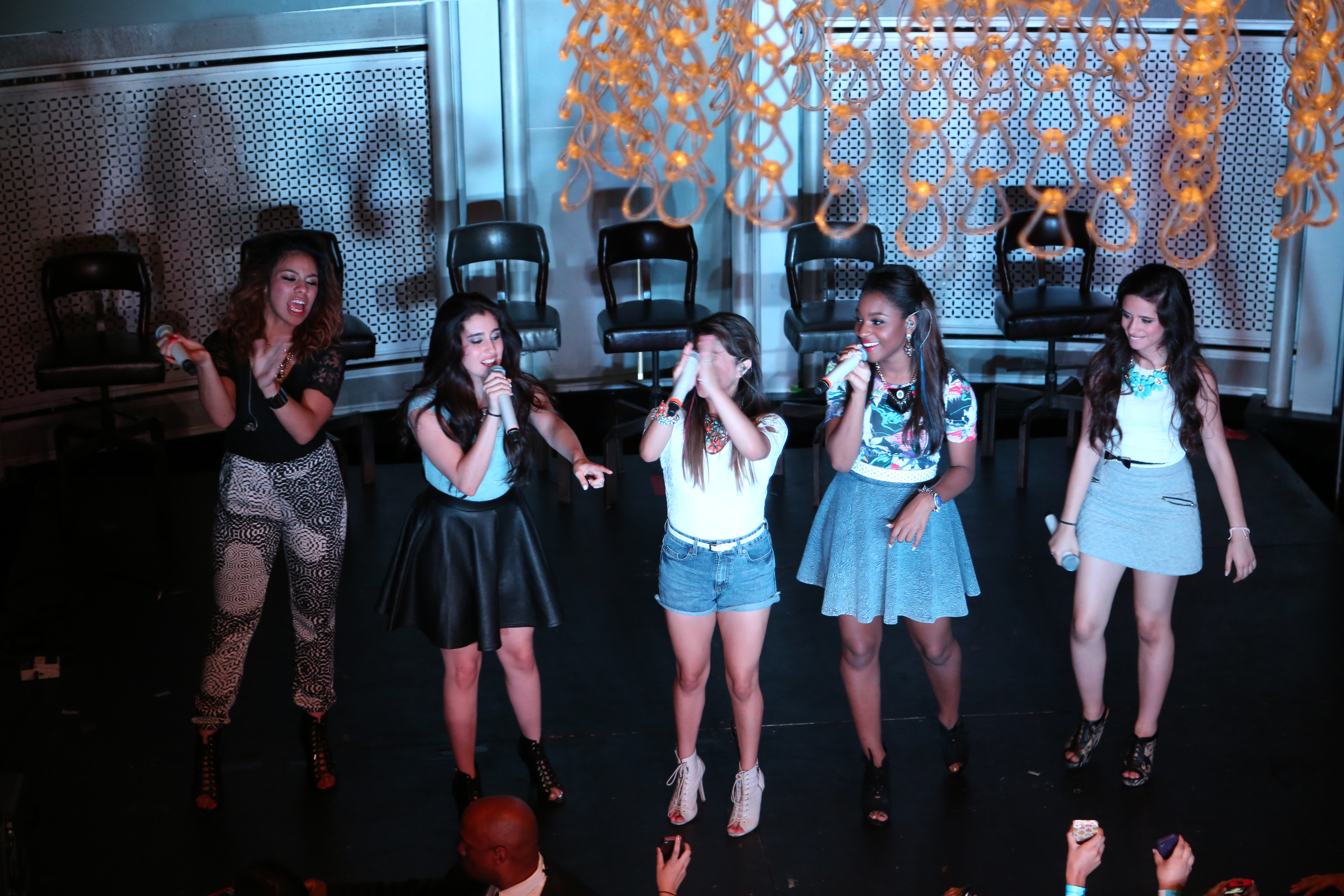
Fifth Harmony performing on the Harmonize America Mall Tour in August 2013

Approximately a month following The X Factor season two finale, on January 17, 2013, Fifth Harmony was officially signed by their mentor Simon Cowell to his record label, Syco Music, in a joint deal with fellow judge L.A. Reid's label, Epic Records. Popdust awarded them the "Next Pop Superstar of 2013" recognition, an annual competition held for rising artists. They began recording covers of songs which were uploaded on the video sharing platform, YouTube. Three of their covers received public praise from the original artists, including Ed Sheeran, Ariana Grande and Mikky Ekko. Fifth Harmony was also featured on Boyce Avenue's extended play, Cover Collaborations, Volume 2, singing covers of "Mirrors" by Justin Timberlake and "When I Was Your Man" by Bruno Mars.

Their debut single "Miss Movin' On" was released on July 16, 2013, as the lead from their debut EP and peaked on the Billboard Hot 100 at number 76, formerly the highest-charting single from an X Factor contestant to appear on the chart. Their debut extended play Better Together was released on October 22, selling 28,000 copies in its first week and peaking on the Billboard 200 at number six. Spanish versions of the EP, Juntos and Juntos Acoustic were released on November 8, peaking at number two and 12, respectively on the Billboard Top Latin Albums chart. The song was certified gold in the United States for selling 500,000 digital downloads and streams combined. The extended play's promotional single, "Me & My Girls" charted on the Billboard Hot Digital Songs chart at 53.

Throughout July and August 2013, Fifth Harmony performed at various shopping malls across the United States in a promotional tour titled Harmonize America. On August 5, 2013, the girl group celebrated their one-year anniversary by performing five shows in New York City. The pop-up concerts throughout the city included performances at the iHeartRadio Theater and Madison Square Park. The group was one of the opening acts for Cher Lloyd during her I Wish Tour which started on September 6, 2013. On September 11, 2013, the group announced their debut concert tour, playing in concert halls in Canada and the United States. Their opening act was indie pop band AJR. On November 24, they performed "Better Together" on the red carpet at the 2013 American Music Awards. They supported Demi Lovato's Neon Lights Tour as one of three opening acts playing 27 arenas across North America.

=== 2014–2015: Reflection and breakthrough ===
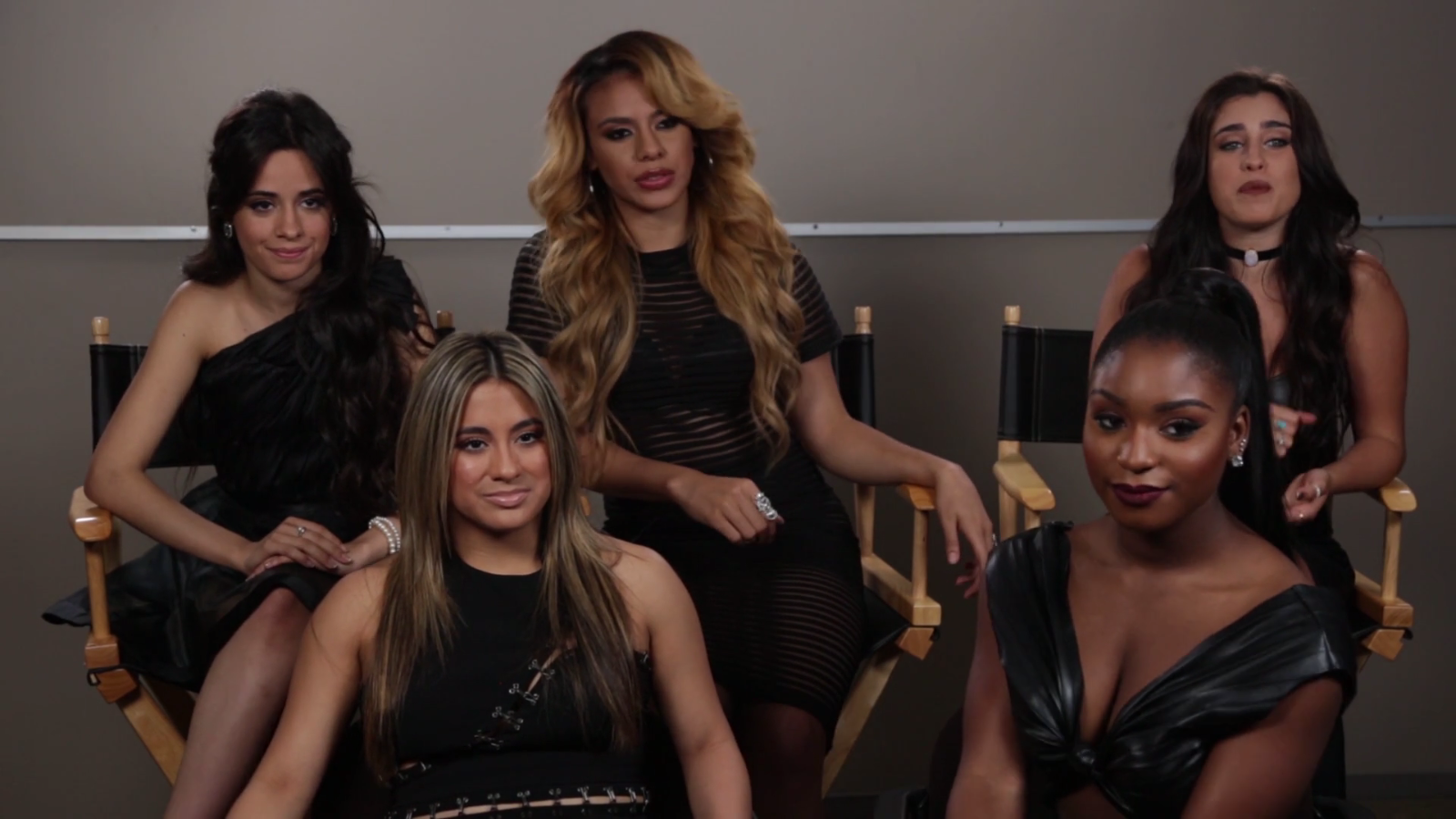
Fifth Harmony being interviewed by Vevo in 2015

On January 23, 2014, Fifth Harmony headlined the MTV Artists to Watch concert, an annual concert which showcases breakout artists that will be promoted by MTV during the year. The concert also featured performances by Tori Kelly, Rixton, Echosmith and Jake Miller. In early 2014, Fifth Harmony confirmed reports that recording had begun for their full-length debut album with record producers Julian Bunetta, Daylight, Joe London, and multi-instrumentalist songwriter Ricky Reed. The group stated the album is less pop, "more rhythmic" and has a more mature sound than Better Together. Fifth Harmony's third concert tour was revealed at the end of March 2014, titled Fifth Times a Charm Tour, with dates in Puerto Rico and the United States.

The album's lead single, "Boss", was released on July 7, 2014, peaked at number 43 on the Billboard Hot 100 chart with first-week sales of 75,000, and received a platinum certification by the United States for selling a million digital downloads and streams combined. The second single from Reflection, the Meghan Trainor-penned "Sledgehammer", was released on October 28, 2014, and went on to become the group's first top 40 entry on the Billboard Hot 100, and was also certified platinum in the United States. On December 4, 2014, the group was invited to sing at the White House for the National Christmas Tree Lighting, where they performed a cover of Mariah Carey's hit Christmas song, "All I Want for Christmas Is You". It was announced by Billboard that a representative from Epic Records had confirmed that the album release was moved from December 16, 2014, to January 27, 2015.

Their debut studio album, Reflection was ultimately released on February 3, 2015. After a full week of sales, the album entered the Billboard 200 at number five with 80,000 units (with 62,000 coming from traditional album sales) and was eventually certified gold by the Recording Industry Association of America in February 2016. The third and final single from the album, "Worth It", featuring American rapper Kid Ink, was released on March 2, 2015, and became the group's most successful song at the time, peaking at number 12 on the Billboard Hot 100, earning the group a triple platinum certification. It charted in the top ten in thirteen countries and received certifications from twelve. The success of "Worth It" was largely impacted with televised performances on the season finale of Dancing with the Stars, and their debut late night appearance on Jimmy Kimmel Live on June 18, 2015, alongside Kid Ink for the first time. The album was supported by the group's fourth concert tour, named the Reflection Tour, visiting North America, Europe and Asia in 63 dates. Fifth Harmony returned to the White House on April 6, 2015, to perform at the annually-held White House Easter Egg Roll, where they sang "Happy Birthday" as part of the Fifth anniversary of First Lady Michelle Obama's "Let's Move" initiative.

On August 14, 2015, Fifth Harmony released "I'm in Love with a Monster" for the Hotel Transylvania 2 soundtrack; it was also featured in the film's trailer. On December 11, 2015, Fifth Harmony received the Group of the Year award at Billboard Women in Music 2015 ceremony, honoring the industry's most influential women. Critically, Reflection landed in several mid-year and year-end lists, including Rolling Stone and Complex who ranked the album at 39 and nine in the exclusively pop category, respectively. Several critics noted the group's experimentation with grungy hip-hop and retro R&B that was previously not heard on their extended play.

=== 2015–2016: 7/27 and Cabello's departure ===
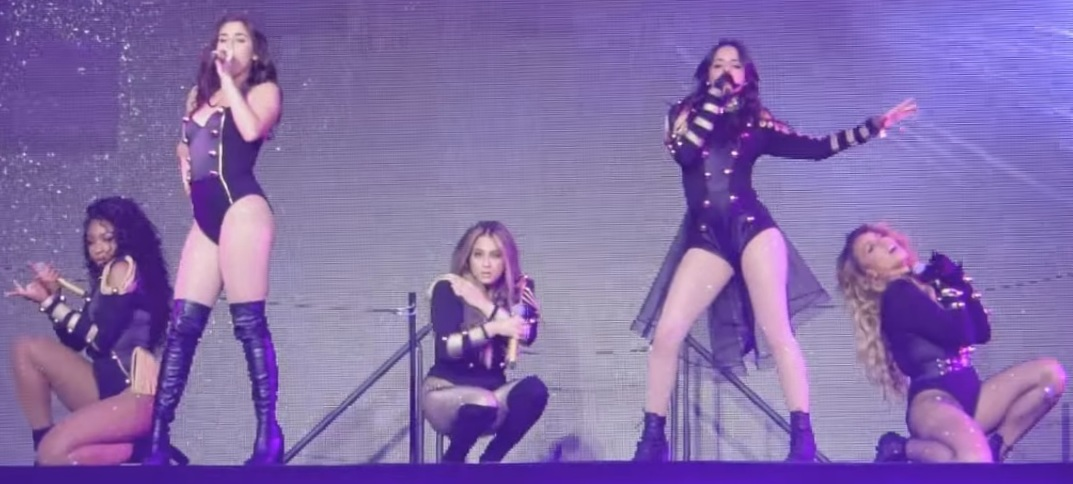
Fifth Harmony performing on the 7/27 Tour in July 2016

On September 23, 2015, the group announced they had started recording for their second studio album. After a winter break, it was announced on February 25, 2016, that Fifth Harmony would be releasing their second studio album, 7/27, on May 20, 2016. The album is named after the day they were formed on The X Factor. It was later announced that its release had been pushed back a week to May 27 to keep with the album's theme of 27. The lead single, "Work from Home", which features American rapper Ty Dolla Sign was released on February 26, 2016, along with its music video. The single peaked at number four on the Billboard Hot 100 and became the group's highest-charting single in the United States, while reaching the top ten in 22 other countries. The single also became the first top-five for an all-female group in almost a decade, following The Pussycat Dolls' song, "Buttons", which peaked at number three.

7/27 debuted at number four on the Billboard 200 with 74,000 album-equivalent units (49,000 in pure album sales), making it the group's highest-charting album to date. The album also marked the group's debut in Japan and South Korea, while also managing top ten peaks in fifteen other countries. The track "All in My Head (Flex)" was released on May 31, 2016, as the second single from the album. It interpolates Mad Cobra's 1995 single "Flex" and was co-written by all five members. The album was supported with the 7/27 Tour which commenced on June 22, 2016, in Lima, Peru, visiting South America, North America and Europe with supporting artists Victoria Monét and JoJo. The group won two MTV Video Music Awards for "Work from Home" and "All in My Head (Flex)" and was named by Billboard the "hottest young stars" under 21 for 2016. They performed 7/27's third and final single "That's My Girl" on the American Music Awards and won their first award from this show in the Collaboration of the Year category for "Work from Home". By November 2016, the album had sold 1.6 million equivalent units, that included sales, streaming and album tracks consumption. The group's last performance of 2016 and as a quintet was on the previously taped Dick Clark's New Year's Rockin' Eve, during which they performed "Worth It", "Work from Home" and "That's My Girl". On December 18, 2016, the group announced that Cabello had left the group and that the remaining four members would continue as a four-piece.

=== 2017–2018: Fifth Harmony and hiatus ===
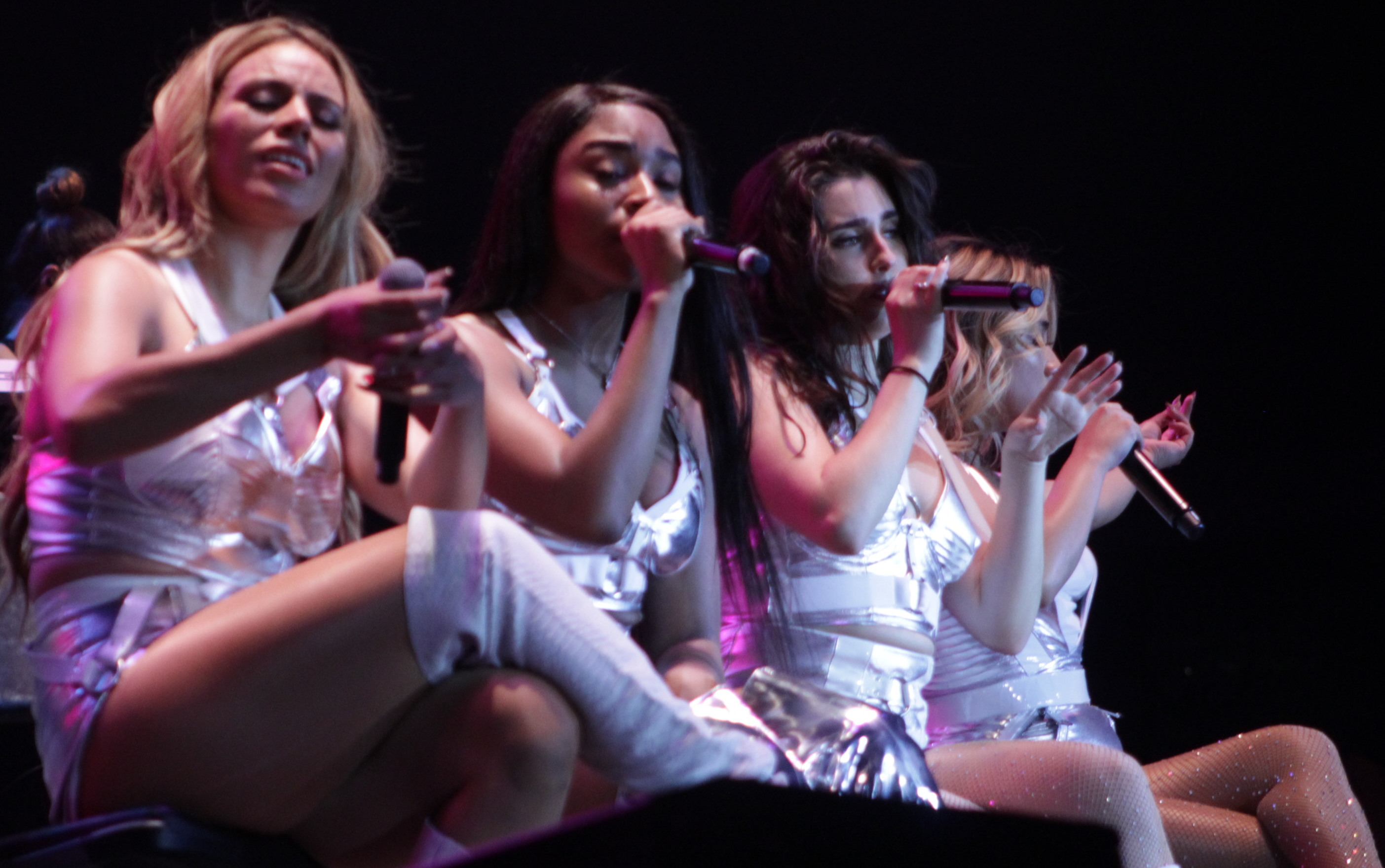
Fifth Harmony performing on the PSA Tour in September 2017

The group made their first appearance since Cabello's departure at the 43rd People's Choice Awards on January 17, 2017. There, they performed an edited version of "Work from Home" and went on to win the award for Favorite Group for the second consecutive year. On May 29, the group announced their new single, "Down", featuring guest vocals from rapper Gucci Mane. The song was released on June 2, and peaked at number 42 on the Billboard Hot 100. On July 24, during an appearance on The Tonight Show Starring Jimmy Fallon, the group announced that their third studio album would be titled Fifth Harmony. It was released on August 25, and debuted at number four on the Billboard 200. The girls performed on the 2017 MTV Video Music Awards, where they started with the promotional single "Angel", before transitioning to "Down" featuring Mane. On August 9, they announced that they would embark on their sixth and final concert tour in support of Fifth Harmony. The group released the second single from the album, titled "He Like That". The music video for the song was released on August 25, and as a single to radio on September 19. The group performed it on Good Morning America and The Late Late Show with James Corden.

The group began their PSA Tour on September 29 in Santiago, Chile, with Becky G serving as opening act in several Latin American countries, including Mexico and Argentina. Lost Kings were also planned to support the group on their Australian tour dates before the dates were cancelled.

Fifth Harmony took over TRL performing "He Like That" and "Don't Say You Love Me". The group recorded the song, "Can You See", for the biblical computer-animated movie The Star. The soundtrack album for The Star was released on October 24. On October 26, they released "Por Favor", a duet with rapper Pitbull, as the third and final single from the Spotify re-release of Fifth Harmony and performed it at the 2017 Latin American Music Awards. The group performed their song, "Can You See", for Disney Parks Magical Christmas Celebration on November 30. They performed it again for the Showtime at the Apollo Christmas special hosted by Steve Harvey on December 14.

On March 19, 2018, the group made their decision to take an indefinite hiatus to pursue solo projects. Before their hiatus, the group completed a final run of shows, and released a music video for "Don't Say You Love Me". As of January 2019, all members have released solo singles.

=== 2025: Reformation ===
On August 31, 2025, the group (minus Cabello, who was on tour in Sydney, Australia at the time) publicly reunited for the first time since 2018, performing as a surprise act during a Jonas Brothers concert at the Dos Equis Pavilion in Dallas, Texas. The group then updated their website with a new logo. Three days later, Jauregui revealed there were no plans for new music from the group, but was open to the possibility of it happening.

== Artistry ==
Fifth Harmony is a pop and R&B girl group. They have explored other genres such as trap, tropical house, hip hop, Rnbass, EDM, dancehall, dance-pop, and reggae. They have described their music as having a "retro feel". The group lists the Spice Girls, Mariah Carey, Whitney Houston and Destiny's Child as their main influences. Lana Del Rey, Adele, Janet Jackson, Celine Dion, Taylor Swift, Brandy, Jennifer Lopez, Patti LaBelle, Cher Lloyd, Carrie Underwood, Jessie J, Beyoncé, Alicia Keys, Christina Aguilera, Selena, Celia Cruz, Demi Lovato, Ed Sheeran and Leona Lewis have influenced individual members of the group.

== Impact ==
Fifth Harmony have been referred to as "the biggest girl group of the 2010s" by Billboard, "America's premiere girl group" by Vulture, "the current standard-bearers for girl group success" by Gold Derby, and "the biggest girl group in a generation" by The Recording Academy. Fifth Harmony's success was compared to the impact Spice Girls made in the 1990s, with MIC dubbing them as "The Spice Girls of the 21st Century". Fifth Harmony have also been referred to as one of the best girl groups of all time by US Magazine, in 2022.

American toy company Mattel produced Barbie-themed celebrity dolls modeled after each member of the group. The group have appeared on Spotify's list of the 'Top 10 Most Influential Artists Under 25' (2015), as well as Billboard's 21 Under 21 list three times (2014, 2015, 2016), including ranking atop the list in 2016. That same year, they became the first female act to be crowned MTV's Hottest Summer Superstar with over 67 million votes, narrowly beating out Beyoncé. Additionally, Fifth Harmony performed twice for former United States President Barack Obama, during his tenure at the White House. They also hold the title for the best-selling girl group in their generation.

Writer Jason Lipshutz of Billboard, wrote that the group "encouraged young women to embrace self-care and confidence with an effectiveness that few other pop artists have been able to match this decade ... Fifth Harmony represented much more than a handful of hits to a young generation of music listeners. They mattered, and they will for a long time to come."

Fifth Harmony was noted for their songs regarding topics such as feminism, female empowerment, body positivity and the diversity between the members which they often used to empower their female audience. Member Lauren emphasized that "We have an energy about us that's so unique and so intense, and it's because of how much power we have in us as individuals, being confident, harnessing that power, and wanting to share that with other women".

In 2022, MTV credited Fifth Harmony for challenging several of the stereotypes associated with girl groups, pouring their voices into their music and speaking out against misogyny and abuse of power, stating that

"Fifth Harmony were also inheriting the low retention rate of girl groups in American popular music, which has long been driven by the misogynistic belief that multiple women couldn't function on a collaborative level without falling out with one another in a fight for the spotlight. It wasn't a fair hand to have been dealt, but it gave them something to prove. After spending their formative teenage years being compared to one another while filling in pre-shaped pop molds, Fifth Harmony looked inward on their third and subsequently final album, Fifth Harmony, and restored the confidence in their voices that had been hidden beneath years of being kept quiet".

Fifth Harmony was involved in a long-time confliction with their ex-label for alleged mistreatments and the ownership of their music. In an interview with Billboard, Jauregui expressed that

"We'd put blood, sweat and tears — and birthdays and funerals we missed — into this thing, it's our livelihoods and our families, this is the train, and now you're like, 'Is the conductor going to come through with the coals, or are we left here to die?"

In 2015, the group contacted a music lawyer that helped transfer the Fifth Harmony trademark from Simon Cowell to its members, becoming the total owners of such.

In 2016, journalist Hugh McIntyre of Forbes, declared "It's safe to say that Fifth Harmony doesn't have any real competition worth speaking of in the girl group lane". The Daily Trojan stated that "Fifth Harmony established themselves as the most popular girl group of the new generation — a void that desperately needed to be filled after the dissolution of the Pussycat Dolls and Danity Kane. The girls found their niche: empowered women of color who didn't shy away from sexuality, feminism or achievement. Their songs echoed with dynamism and fierceness, and their vocal talents shined through in every hit".

== Awards and achievements ==
All three of the group's studio albums, as well as their extended play charted within the top ten of the US Billboard 200, making them the girl group with the most entries on the chart in the 21st century; they are also tied with Destiny's Child, for the third most top ten entries on the chart by a girl group overall, following behind the Chicks and the Supremes. Three members of Fifth Harmony (Camila Cabello, Normani, and Lauren Jauregui) have charted on the Billboard Hot 100 as soloists, which made them the fourth girl group to achieve this. Additionally, they are one of three groups to have two soloists (Camila Cabello and Normani) reach number one on the Mainstream Top 40 chart.

Their biggest hit, "Work from Home", became the highest-charting single in the United States and the first top-five entry from an all-female group to chart in ten years since "Buttons" by the Pussycat Dolls, which peaked at number three. In 2017, "Work from Home" ranked at number 14 on the list of "100 Greatest Girl Group Songs of All Time: Critics' Picks" by Billboard. Rolling Stone named it one of the best songs of the 2010s. In 2019, the song was placed fourth on the UK Official Charts Company's list of the "top 100 girl band singles of the last 25 years", which was the highest position for an international or American act. The music video for the song was the most watched of 2016 on YouTube.

Fifth Harmony's single "Worth It", was the first music video by a girl group to surpass one billion views on YouTube. It has amassed over two billion views, becoming the group's second music video to achieve this following "Work from Home".

== Philanthropy ==
Ally Brooke became a spokesperson for the mother and child health organization March of Dimes in November 2015, in honor of Prematurity Awareness Month and World Prematurity Day. Camila Cabello also partnered with Save the Children to show her care for Syria's children. Lauren Jauregui was involved in Do Something's campaign #LoseYourVCard to help and encourage new adults to vote and to help guide them in the process so the youth of the United States could be more involved in the outcome. Normani Kordei was named the Diversity Ambassador of Cybersmile foundation after being abused online on the basis of her race.

== Endorsements and sponsorships ==
Sony Music Entertainment announced that they would be launching endorsement deals between Fifth Harmony and a number of companies, including two clothing lines with Wet Seal. The first clothing line with Wet Seal was launched in August 2014 in 200 stores across America, featuring a collection from each member based on their individual style. During the summer of 2015, Fifth Harmony were named as the faces of the clothing brand Candie's.

== Band members ==
- Ally Brooke (2012–2018, 2025)
- Dinah Jane (2012–2018, 2025)
- Lauren Jauregui (2012–2018, 2025)
- Normani (2012–2018, 2025)

Former members

- Camila Cabello (2012–2016)

== Discography ==
- Reflection (2015)
- 7/27 (2016)
- Fifth Harmony (2017)

== Filmography ==
=== Television ===
Year	Name	Role	Notes
2012	The X Factor	Contestants	22 episodes
2014	Faking It	Boy Banned	Episode: "The Ecstasy and the Agony"
2015	Barbie: Life in the Dreamhouse	Themselves (voices)	Episode: "Sisters' Fun Day"
2015	Taylor Swift: The 1989 World Tour Live	Themselves	Concert film
2016	The Ride	Themselves	Episode: "Fifth Harmony"
2018	Lip Sync Battle	Themselves	Episode: "Fifth Harmony"
2018	Sugar	Themselves	Episode: "Fifth Harmony surprises a remarkable fan and her wheelchair dance group."

== Tours ==
- 2013 tour
- The Worst Kept Secret Tour (2014)
- Fifth Times a Charm Tour (2014)
- The Reflection Tour (2015–2016)
- The 7/27 Tour (2016–2017)
- PSA Tour (2017–2018)
