= Down (Fifth Harmony song) =

2017 single by Fifth Harmony

Single by Fifth Harmony featuring Gucci Mane

from the album Fifth Harmony
- Released: June 2, 2017
- Recorded: 2017
- Studio: Westlake Recording Studios (Los Angeles, California); Sole Studios (London, England)
- Genre: Pop
- Length: 2:44
- Label: Epic; Syco
- Songwriters: Joshua Coleman; Radric Davis; Dallas Koehlke; Jude Demorest
- Producers: Ammo; DallasK; Andrew Bolooki^{[a]}

Fifth Harmony singles chronology
| "That's My Girl" (2016) | "Down" (2017) | "He Like That" (2017) |

Gucci Mane singles chronology
| "Perfect Pint" (2017) | "Down" (2017) | "Tone It Down" (2017) |

Music video
- "Down" on YouTube

"Down" is a song recorded by American girl group Fifth Harmony for their self-titled third studio album (2017), featuring additional vocals by American rapper Gucci Mane. It was released on June 2, 2017, through Epic Records as the lead single from the album. Written by Jude Demorest, Gucci Mane and its producers Joshua Coleman and Dallas Koehlke, "Down" marked the group's first single since the departure of original member Camila Cabello in December 2016. The song was serviced to rhythmic contemporary radio four days after its initial release and then contemporary hit radio on June 13, 2017. A dancehall number, "Down" has a production consisting of bass, snare drums, synths and soft snaps. The lyrics are structured in verse–pre-chorus–chorus form. Although it is written from a romantic perspective, "Down" was inspired by the group's bond as a quartet and the adversities they have faced together and individually.

The song was noted by music critics for being similar to their 2016 single "Work from Home" in terms of production and structure, though others praised its sonority and summer-friendly production. However, some criticized its resemblance to "Work from Home". Commercially, "Down" was moderately successful; it debuted at its peak position of number 42 on US Billboard Hot 100 becoming their second-highest debut. It also reached the top fifty in the United Kingdom, Canada, Ireland, and Portugal. It received a gold certification by the Recording Industry Association of America (RIAA) for 500,000 equivalent-units sold domestically in the United States.

An accompanying music video for the song was released on June 8, 2017; the clip follows the group singing in separated rooms from a motel as well as having an overnight pool party, interspersed with scenes where they dance in front of a neon-lit parking lot. To further promote "Down", Fifth Harmony performed it for the first time on the Good Morning America Concert Series on June 2, 2017, alongside Gucci Mane. The song was also performed in several revised shows including the 2017 MTV Video Music Awards. It was included as part of the set list on their PSA Tour (2017–18).

== Background and release ==
"Down" was written by Ammo, DallasK, Claire Demorest and Radric Davis while its production was handled by Ammo and DallasK. Fifth Harmony recorded "Down" at Westlake Recording Studios in Santa Monica, California. The group started working on their third studio album in January 2017. For the album, they contacted several music producers, going with the duo Ammo and DallasK who had produced "Work from Home" (2016). After the track was completed, the group had the idea of including the rapper Gucci Mane on it. After listening to the song, he quickly created and recorded his verses at Sole Studios in London, England. "Down" was later mixed at Callanwood Fine Arts Center by Phil Tan in Atlanta, Georgia and mastered by Emerson Mancini at Larrebee Studios in North Hollywood.

On May 28, 2017, Fifth Harmony began a daily countdown to the release of "Down" by sharing coordinates of each member's hometown. By going to the specified location, fans were able to decode parts of the song's lyrics through a Snapchat filter. The group shared the single's accompanying cover art on Twitter on May 30, 2017. Epic Records and Syco Music released "Down" to all major streaming services and digital retailers on June 2, 2017, as the lead single from Fifth Harmony's self-titled third studio album. It marked the group's first single as a quartet following original member Camila Cabello's departure in December 2016 to pursue a solo career. In the United States, "Down" was sent to rhythmic contemporary radio stations on June 6 and to contemporary hit radio on June 13, 2017.

== Composition and lyrical interpretation ==
"Down"
A 20-second sound sample of "Down", a dancehall number which uses bass, snare drums intercepted with finger-snaps and tropical synths. Written in verse–pre-chorus–chorus form, it is built on a repetitive chorus. The final chorus features the members harmonizing around each other voices over a crescendo as illustred in the sample above.

A dancehall-tinged song, "Down" comprises sparse, tropical synthesizers and percussion, rattling snare drums and soft finger snaps. According to the sheet music published at Musicnotes.com by Sony/ATV Music Publishing, "Down" is written in the key of A♭ major and played in a moderate groove of 98 beats per minute. Their vocals range from the note of B♭_{3} to G_{4}. It has a chord progression of A♭–E♭–Fm–Cm. The lyrics are constructed in the verse–pre-chorus–chorus form; Lauren Jauregui sings the song's first verse characterizing her ideal companion, "I need somebody with some patience / 'Cause you know I got a temperament / And yeah, you got a reputation / Nothin' that a little love can't fix / There ain't no kinda situation / Where I wouldn't cross a line for you". While Normani Kordei sings the second verse, "You the type that I could bake for / 'Cause baby, you know how to take that cake". Mike Wass from Idolator considered Kordei's verse the "cheekiest part" of the song.

The first and second pre-choruses are sung by Dinah Jane and Ally Brooke. The third verse features distorted bass drums and is rapped by Gucci Mane who references popular culture and brags about his relationship, likening it to that of American criminals Bonnie and Clyde. After his verse, the song enters into a crescendo. The lyrics are akin to that of a love song, although according to Kordei, it is also about Fifth Harmony's bond as a quartet. In an interview for Music Choice, she explained that with the song the group "kind of connect with each other because we've been through so much and we've always held each other 'Down'." Hilary Hughes of MTV noted that the group "sing about how the objects of their affection are totally worth figuring out, impatience and miscommunication aside."

== Critical reception ==
Upon its release, "Down" was noted for its summer-friendly sound, being described as a "Song of the Summer" by some music critics like Joey Guerra of the Houston Chronicle, who wrote that the song was made to "move your hips while sing along with in the car". Sarah Murphy of Exclaim! and Peter A. Berry of XXL magazine also acclaimed its production, Murphy opined that the track "seems well on its way to becoming a certified summer banger", while Berry applauded the song's "summer ready instrumental" and "anthemic hook". Sadie Bell of Billboard magazine appreciated its "danceable, clean synthesizers" and "moment of blissful release". Eric Renner Brown of Entertainment Weekly found the group's collaboration with Gucci Mane unexpected, but said it totally works. Rolling Stone's editors Ryan Reed and Jon Blistein expressed positive opinions about "Down" in separated articles, Reed called it "smooth, cruise-ready" and "breezy" while Blistein applauded its danceable pop production and lyrical content. In an interview with the group, Time editor Raisa Bruner called it a "party anthem" that gives each singer a chance to stretch her voice over "a spare and addictive beat." Mike Wass of Idolator called the track "something of a triumph." He describes the song as a "bouncy banger" while praised the division of verses and individual vocals delivered by each member.

"Down" was noted for being musically and structurally similar to "Work from Home" for usage of tropical snare drums, repetitive chorus and a guest appearance by a rapper. Maeve McDermott from USA Today said the song was "indistinguishable" from the group's sophomore studio album, 7/27 (2016); further noting that it borrows its "melodic bounce and repetitive chorus" from "Work from Home". Brian Josephs of Spin felt that "Down" stayed within the framework of their 2016 single by retaining both that song's "sparse tropical percussions and the group's love of clichés". However, not all reviews were about the song's production and its resemblance to "Work from Home". Forbes editor Hugh McIntyre for example, wrote an article where he said that it was "stylistically less interesting" than any "prominent moment" the group had in their previous album. McIntyre clarifies that the song is not a bad composition but an album of such importance like a comeback after losing a member, usually is not "fronted by something so basic." Similarly, Brian Josephs of Spin dismissed its inconsistencies compared to "Work from Home" saying that although Normani's verse comes off "enticing", the group finds themselves "rallying around an anemic hook".

== Chart performance ==
In the United States, "Down" debuted at number 42 on the Billboard Hot 100 for the week dated June 24, 2017, with first week sales of 36,000 copies, 9.2 million streams and a 7.1 million radio audience reach. It marked their second highest debut on this chart, following "Work from Home", which debuted at number 12. It also entered at number 37 on the Mainstream Top 40 chart and at number 12 on the Digital Songs chart. The song ran from June 24 to September 16, 2017, remaining a total of ten non-consecutive weeks on chart. As of September 2017, had sold over 500,000 equivalent-units (combining domestic streams numbers and paid digital downloads) in the United States and was certified gold by the Recording Industry Association of America (RIAA).

In the United Kingdom, it peaked at number 47 on the UK Singles Chart, spending nine weeks in the top seventy-five and ten weeks on the chart in total. It was Fifth Harmony's seventh entry and their fifth longest-charting single in the United Kingdom. It also debuted at its peak position inside top 100 in various countries such as Australia, Portugal, France, Ireland, Canada, Scotland and Spain, where it peaked at number eight.

== Music video ==
=== Background and reception ===
The music video premiered on Fifth Harmony's Vevo channel on June 8, 2017. It was directed by James Larese and filmed at the Hollywood Premiere Motel located on Hollywood Boulevard in Los Angeles, California. The video opens in the parking lot of a neon-lit motel around night time. Jauregui is in the driver's seat, adjusting her rear-view mirror. Each member steps out of a Dodge Durango. All of them are dressed in retro-style outfits and head towards a room individually. The four doors close simultaneously as the title of the song appears.

Fifth Harmony dancing in front of a seedy, neon-lit motel.

Jauregui is in a room as dim violet neon lights brightens it and an electric fan circulates air. The scene is spliced with a scene where the group perform a choreographed dance in the parking lot of the motel with pinkish-violet stage lights in the ground. Jane is wearing a fur-style coat with glasses in her individual take. She sings next to a window where a red neon light streaks through the room. Jauregui is momentarily shown as she finishes the first chorus before Kordei's verse is heard. She wears a white and green outfit as she dances sensually through her room in a red setting. The light streaking is normal, compared to the other members. Close-up shots of her face are shown. Brooke then sings, in a bright yellow room. The scene shifts where they perform their dance routine in front of the parking lot, from the start of the video. Gucci Mane takes the next verse, rapping away from the group on the stairs of the motel wearing sunglasses. Quick takes of the group in a pool are also spliced in between. He also raps in front of a wall where four flamingos are seen as the camera pans upwards. The group sing together in the pool, where some of them hold on to one another. The video ends with the girls standing in front of the parking lot, where the chorus took place.

=== Reception and accolades ===
Entertainment Weekly's Nolan Freeley compared the group's outfits to those of Cookie Lyon from the Fox drama Empire. In a positive review, Peter A. Berry of XXL called the video a "perfectly pop visual for a song tailor-made for the chill vibes of a newly arrived summer." Teen Vogue's Devon Elizabeth praised the colorful aesthetic presence in the video commenting that its visuals "are bound to make anyone crave some slumber party fun with their girl squad." Fuse writer Bianca Gracie noted its scenery and sexuality expressed in the group's choreography, according to her the women of Fifth Harmony transformed a motel parking lot into their "own dance party as they show off their sultry moves and party-ready outfits."

Echoing similar feelings to Gracie, Mike Wass of Idolator thought the members proved themselves as "competent dancers" in the video, although he felt the dance routine as simple, he perceived they executed it very well, transforming it in one of the best things in the video. He also commented about the changes they endured, which are displayed in the video. In a mixed-positive review, Beatrice Hazlehurst of Paper criticized how the group's wardrobe was followed by them grinding on "floral bedspreads under hot neon lights" but reiterates that she is "not mad". She follows her review by calling Gucci Mane the highlight of the video. The music video received the nominations for Best Pop Video, Best Choreography and Song of the Summer at the 2017 MTV Video Music Awards. They won Best Pop Video, becoming their third award from this event and Gucci Mane's first. As of February 2024, the video has surpassed 99 million views.

== Live performances ==
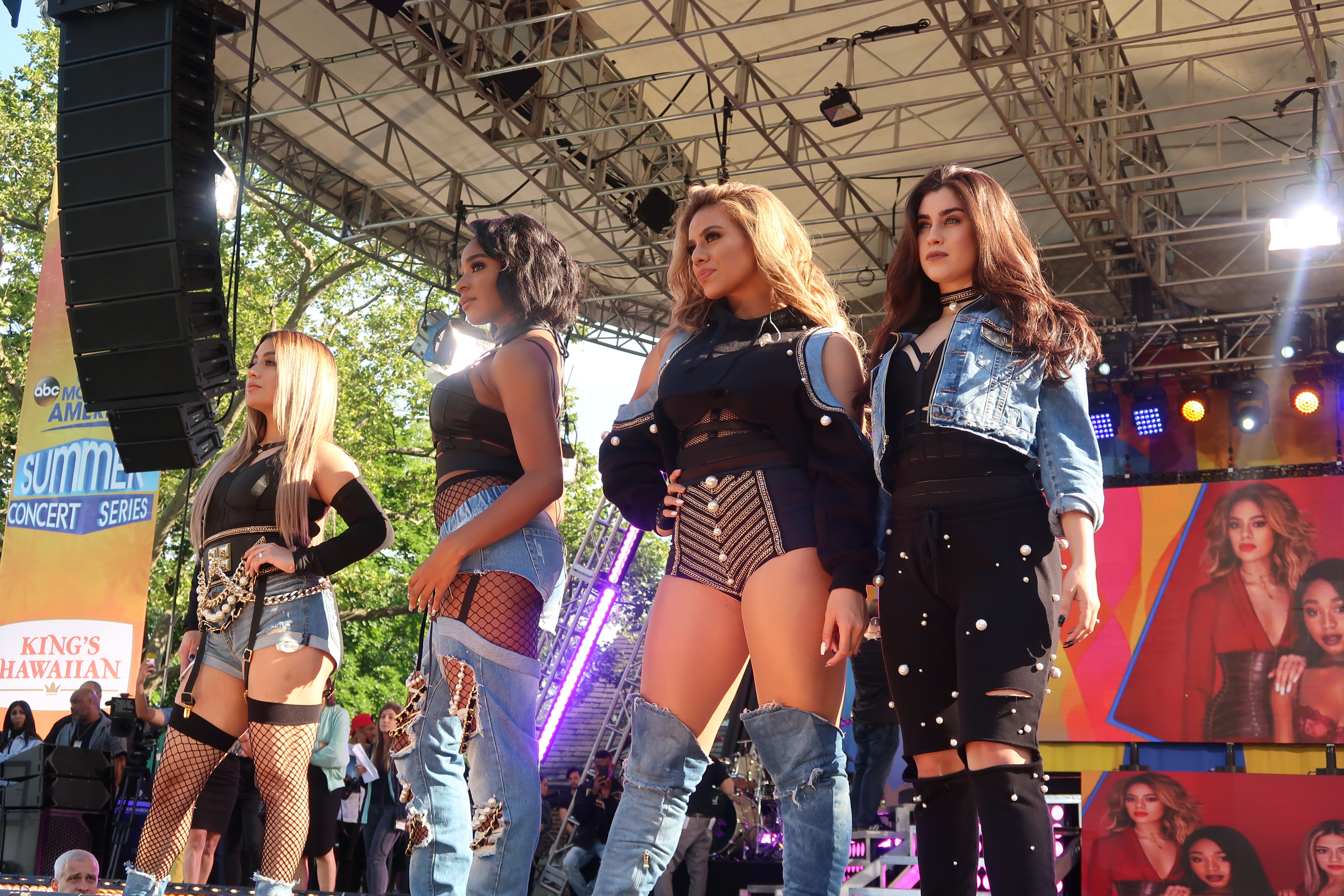
Fifth Harmony promoted "Down" for the first time on Good Morning America hours after its release (picture taken during the show on June 2, 2017.)

Fifth Harmony and Gucci Mane gave their first live performance of "Down" on Good Morning America on June 2, 2017, at the Central Park in New York City. During this performance, all of the members wore ensemble outfits of black and blue jeans. The performance was also complimented by Gucci Mane and was backed by a keyboardist and a drummer. They also promoted the single on the iHeartRadio Summer Pool Party where they also performed singles from their 7/27 record. They performed the track with Gucci Mane on The Tonight Show Starring Jimmy Fallon, for the episode that aired on July 24, 2017, during which host Jimmy Fallon announced their third album title and release date.

On August 27, 2017, the group performed "Down" at the 2017 MTV Video Music Awards that took place at The Forum in Inglewood, California. For this performance, they took the stage with an anonymous fifth member over an elevated platform. Before they sang "Angel", the anonymous fifth member was abruptly launched off stage as they removed their hoods to start singing. This moment immediately went viral becoming one of the most talked moments of the event on the internet and was interpreted as a reference to their ex-bandmate Camila Cabello who left the group in December 2016. Anna Gaca of Spin considered the moment as the most "interesting" of the performance. Rolling Stone's Elias Leight ranked the performance as the fourth best moment of the event. He wrote that the moment when the fifth member jump off the stage "overshadowed" the whole performance. However, during an interview on Good Morning America three days following the VMAs, the group clarified the stunt, admitting it was more of an artistic statement than a reference to the ex-member saying, "We get asked all the time if we're getting a fifth member, and we wanted to show the world in an artistic way that, hey, the four of us are Fifth Harmony."

On September 2, 2017, Fifth Harmony appeared as the main performers on RocksCorps event at Makuhari Messe in Tokyo, Japan, where they performed "Down" along with other songs in front of 4,000 people. At the TIDAL X benefit concert on October 17, 2017, the group performed "Down" and "He Like That" wearing pink latex boots and bodysuits, where Jauregui also made a shout-out to Mane for his wedding.

== Credits and personnel ==
Credits adapted from Fifth Harmony's liner notes and Qobuz.

Recording

- Recorded at Westlake Studios, Los Angeles, California and Sole Studios, London, England.
- Mixed at Callanwolde Fine Arts Center, Atlanta, California.
- Mastered at Larrebe Studios North Hollywood, California.

Management

- Published by Each Note Counts/Prescription Songs (ASCAP) all rights administered by Kobalt Songs Music Publishing (ASCAP) // Dallas K Music (ASCAP) // Songs of Universal, Inc. / Fox Film Music Corporation (BMI) // Radric Davis Publishing LLC (ASCAP) all rights o/b/o itself and Radric Davis Publishing LLC administered by WB Music Corporation.
- Management – Larry Rudolph, Dan Dymtrow and Tayra Beikae / Maverick Management
- Gucci Mane appears courtesy of Atlantic Records Corporation

Personnel

- Vocals – Ally Brooke Hernandez, Dinah Jane Hansen, Lauren Jauregui, Normani Kordei Hamilton and Radric Delantic Davis
- Songwriting – Joshua Coleman, Dallas Koehlke, Jude Demorest and Radric Davis.
- Production – Ammo and DallasK
- Programming and Keyboards – Ammo and DallasK
- Vocal Production and Recording – Andrew Bolooki
- Vocal Engineering Assistant – Desi Aguilar
- Engineer – Ammo
- Mixing Engineer – Phil Tan
- Mastering Engineer – Emerson Mancini
- Production Coordination – Andrew Luftman and Sarah Shelton

Notes

- ^{^[a]} signifies a vocal producer.

== Charts ==
| Chart (2017–2018) | Peak position |
|---|---|
| Australia (ARIA) | 66 |
| Belgium (Ultratip Bubbling Under Flanders) | 22 |
| Belgium (Ultratip Bubbling Under Wallonia) | 40 |
| Canada Hot 100 (Billboard) | 46 |
| Czech Republic Singles Digital (ČNS IFPI) | 50 |
| France Singles Sales (SNEP) | 73 |
| Hungary (Single Top 40) | 22 |
| Ireland (IRMA) | 46 |
| Netherlands (Single Top 100) | 94 |
| New Zealand Heatseekers (RMNZ) | 3 |
| Philippines (Philippine Hot 100) | 24 |
| Portugal (AFP) | 40 |
| Scottish Singles Sales (Official Charts) | 24 |
| Slovakia Singles Digital (ČNS IFPI) | 47 |
| Spain (PROMUSICAE) | 100 |
| Sweden (Sverigetopplistan) | 85 |
| Switzerland (Schweizer Hitparade) | 58 |
| UK Singles (Official Charts) | 47 |
| US Billboard Hot 100 | 42 |
| US Pop Airplay (Billboard) | 25 |

== Certifications ==
| Region | Certification | Certified units/sales |
|---|---|---|
| Canada (Music Canada) | Gold | 40,000^{‡} |
| Mexico (AMPROFON) | Gold | 30,000^{‡} |
| New Zealand (RMNZ) | Gold | 15,000^{‡} |
| United Kingdom (BPI) | Silver | 200,000^{‡} |
| United States (RIAA) | Gold | 500,000^{‡} |
^{‡} Sales+streaming figures based on certification alone.

== Release history ==
| Region | Date | Format | Label | Ref. |
|---|---|---|---|---|
| Various | June 2, 2017 | Digital download | Epic; Syco | |
| United States | June 6, 2017 | Rhythmic contemporary | Epic | |
| United States | June 13, 2017 | Contemporary hit radio | Epic | |
