= He Like That =

- Remix artwork

Single by Fifth Harmony

from the album Fifth Harmony
- Released: September 19, 2017
- Recorded: 2017
- Genre: R&B; hip hop
- Length: 3:37
- Label: Epic; Syco
- Songwriters: Ammo; DallasK; Ester Dean; Frank "Nitty" Brim; Dexter Ansley; Gerald Baillergeau; Ondreius Burgie; Stanley Burrell; George Clinton; Garry Shider; David Spradley
- Producers: Ammo; DallasK; Ester Dean; Chris "Tek" O'Ryan

Fifth Harmony singles chronology
"Down" (2017)	"He Like That" (2017)	"Por Favor" (2017)

Music video
- "He Like That" on YouTube

"He Like That" is a song recorded by American girl group Fifth Harmony for their self-titled third studio album (2017). It was released as the album's second single on September 19, 2017, after being sent to US contemporary hit radio. The song was written and produced by Ammo, DallasK and Ester Dean, and has an interpolation from MC Hammer's 1994 single "Pumps and a Bump". Influenced by reggae, R&B and hip-hop, the song is about a woman's appreciation of a man's body. The music video premiered on August 25, 2017, as part of a Vevo live stream to celebrate the album's release. A remix featuring French Montana was released on October 20, 2017.

== Background and release ==
"He Like That" was written by its producers Ammo, DallasK Ester Dean and Frank NItty Brim. Fifth Harmony's A&R executive played the demo during recording sessions for their self-titled third studio album (2017). While listening to the song, they described it as "different", and recorded it in the following sessions. Chris "TEK" O'Ryan recorded and produced the vocals. Phill Tan mixed the track, and Josh Cadwin was the audio engineer. Emerson Mancini mastered the audio. "He Like That" was released to US contemporary hit radio on September 19, 2017. A remix with French Montana was released on October 20, 2017.

== Composition and lyrics ==
Built on a guitar-driven groove, "He Like That" contains influences from reggae, R&B and hip-hop and has an uptempo rhythm. The song uses an interpolation from MC Hammer's 1994 single "Pumps and a Bump" during the pre-chorus and bridge. The lyrics revolve around a woman who praises a man's body. This appreciation is demonstrated through the lyrics ("You got that good boy attitude, and yeah I kinda like it. You got the tats on your arm, got a bad girl excited"), which are performed by Dinah Jane during the first verse. Ally Brooke describes the characteristics of an attractive man, by singing: "He got that rough neck swaggy, but he know how to hide it/He got that dope boy cash, but he get it nine to five-ing." The chorus uses repetitive lines.

== Critical reception ==
"He Like That" received positive reviews from critics, who praised its tropical sound. Identifying the song as an album highlight, Entertainment Weekly's Marc Snetiker wrote that it flits along with "a strident tropical bounce". Raisa Brune of Time responded positively to the production, and said the track "turns into a catchy, almost tropical hip-hop tune that lets each member of the foursome stretch her voice". While comparing "He Like That" to songs Ester Dean had written for Rihanna, Spin's Katherine St. Asaph felt that its use of a guitar was similar to Britney Spears' 2016 single "Make Me...". Commentators also likened "He Like That" to other tracks released by Fifth Harmony. Citing it as one of the best songs from the album, Mike Nied from Idolator wrote that it "oozes confidence and sex appeal" absent in their previous single "Down" (2017). Variety's editor Cris Willman identified "He Like That" and "Sauced Up" as "deep pleasures" from the album.

== Music video ==
=== Background and reception ===
The music video was directed by James Larese, who previously worked with Fifth Harmony for "Down". Portions of the video were filmed in an old club located in Los Angeles, California. The video contains neon lights, an intensive illumination and balance of colors, which is a similar aesthetic to "Down". The scenery is reminiscent of 1990s hip hop block parties and Jamaican dancehall; it features graffiti and loudspeakers. Alexandra Holterman from Billboard described the video as "sweaty, confident, and unapologetically sexy." Deepa Lakshmin of MTV News viewed the video as "hotter" than their video for "Work from Home" and praised the group's coordination. The video received comparisons to Britney Spears' video for "I'm a Slave 4 U" due to their similar themes and choreography.

=== Synopsis ===
The video shows the "sensual" side of the group and was compared to Britney Spears' "I'm a Slave 4 U" video.

The video begins with a vinyl record that introduces the group and song title. Close up shots of each girl are shown, drenched in neon lights; then the scene shifts to Dinah Jane, sporting a long pink skirt, performing a choreographed dance routine with a male dancer. The video then cuts to Normani Kordei, who dances a sensual and intimate choreography with a back-up dancer; the singer wears a red latex top with pants. During the chorus, the group is shown with several men and women who are lying on a couch caressing each other. As the second verse begins, Ally Brooke dances with another male dancer. Kordei then dances with two men, in front of the same scene where she performed earlier. As the second chorus is introduced, the members perform in different outfits on the center of the dance floor, backed by male dancers, interspersed with scenes of the members lying in the couch surrounded by several men. Lauren Jauregui then also dances with a backup dancer. This scene cuts to Hansen and Kordei leaning against a wall and dancing with their partners, interspersed with scenes of the group still grinding in the club. The clip ends with a shot of Kordei and Hansen, sensually lying on their dance partners' backs who are doing push up exercises. As of February 2024, the video has surpassed over 94 million views.

== Track listing ==
Streaming – French Montana remix

No.	Title	Length
1.	"He Like That" (French Montana remix)	3:35

== Charts ==
Chart (2017)	Peak position
Canada Hot 100 (Billboard)	75
New Zealand Heatseekers (RMNZ)	3
Philippines (Philippine Hot 100)	53
Portugal (AFP)	95
Sweden Heatseekers (Sverigetopplistan)	10
US Bubbling Under Hot 100 (Billboard)	1
US Pop Airplay (Billboard)	33

== Release history ==
Region	Date	Format	Label(s)	Ref.
United States	September 19, 2017	Contemporary hit radio	Epic; Syco	
Various	October 20, 2017	Digital download (French Montana remix)	Epic; Syco	
