= 2020 iHeartRadio Music Awards =

7th edition of the iHeartRadio Music Awards

- Date: March 29, 2020 (originally planned telecast); September 4–7, 2020 (virtual press conference)
- Location: Shrine Auditorium, Los Angeles (originally planned telecast); Various locations across the United States (virtual press conference)
- Country: United States
- Hosted by: Usher (originally planned telecast); None (virtual press conference)

Highlights
- Most awards: Billie Eilish (4)
- Most nominations: Billie Eilish; Shawn Mendes (7 each)
- Website: news.iheart.com/awards

Television/radio coverage
- Network: iHeartRadio

The 2020 iHeartRadio Music Awards would have been the 6th annual event of the awards. It was originally scheduled to take place on March 29, 2020. The ceremony was to be hosted by Usher and air on Fox. Online listener voting on all categories continued as previously scheduled until March 23, with the Best Fan Army category remaining open for voting until March 27. The event was subsequently cancelled on August 24, 2020, due to the COVID-19 pandemic, and winners were revealed on September 4 to 7, 2020. Following the cancellation, Usher would subsequently host the 2021 ceremony on May 27, 2021, instead.

The most awarded artist was Billie Eilish with four. The most nominated artists were Eilish and Shawn Mendes with seven each, followed by Taylor Swift and Camila Cabello who tied with six.

== Impact of the COVID-19 pandemic ==
The ceremony was originally to take place at the Shrine Auditorium in Los Angeles, which was scheduled on March 29, 2020. On March 12, due to the state of California restricting gatherings to 250 people in response to the COVID-19 outbreak, which it had already declared a pandemic by the World Health Organization, and has cancelled scores of television events through March into July, along with postponing the ACM Awards and Billboard Music Awards. On the morning of March 16, iHeartMedia announced the ceremony's official postponement.

Half of the ceremony's original March 29 timeslot was retained by iHeartMedia, with both them and Fox then promoting a series of musical performances from several popular artists and bands performing from home via video and teleconferencing platforms compiled together as the iHeart Living Room Concert for America hosted by Elton John, along with charitable appeals for Feeding America and the First Responders Children's Foundation. The program also aired over several iHeartRadio stations nationwide, and was simulcast on Fox Sports 2, Fox Soccer Plus, Fox News Channel, Fox Business Network, the Big Ten Network, and Fox Deportes. The first half of the original timeslot was replaced by reruns of previously aired episodes of "Screenless" in The Simpsons and "Peter & Lois' Wedding" in Family Guy. On August 24, 2020, it was announced that the ceremony had been cancelled and that the winners would be announced through the iHeartRadio stations over Labor Day weekend.

== Winners and nominees ==
Song of the Year	Female Artist of the Year
"Truth Hurts" - Lizzo; "Bad Guy" – Billie Eilish; "Old Town Road" - Lil Nas X; "Señorita" - Shawn Mendes and Camila Cabello; "Sucker" - Jonas Brothers	Billie Eilish; Ariana Grande; Halsey; Lizzo; Taylor Swift
Male Artist of the Year	Best Duo/Group of the Year
Post Malone; Ed Sheeran; Khalid; Luke Combs; Shawn Mendes	Jonas Brothers; Dan + Shay; Imagine Dragons; Maroon 5; Panic! at the Disco
Album of the Year (per genre)	Best Collaboration
R&B: Khalid - Free Spirit; Hip-Hop: Juice Wrld - Death Race for Love; Pop: Taylor Swift - Lover; Rock: Tool - Fear Inoculum; Country: Luke Combs - What You See Is What You Get; Alternative Rock: Billie Eilish - When We All Fall Asleep, Where Do We Go?; Dance: The Chainsmokers - World War Joy; Latin: Bad Bunny - X 100pre	"Señorita" – Shawn Mendes and Camila Cabello; "Dancing with a Stranger" – Sam Smith and Normani; "Eastside" – Benny Blanco, Halsey and Khalid; "I Don't Care" – Ed Sheeran and Justin Bieber; "Sunflower" – Post Malone and Swae Lee
Most Thumbed Up Artist of the Year	Most Thumbed Up Song of the Year
Post Malone	"Sunflower" – Post Malone and Swae Lee
Best New Pop Artist	Alternative Rock Song of the Year
Lizzo; Ava Max; Fletcher; Lewis Capaldi; Lil Nas X	"Bad Guy" – Billie Eilish; "Doin' Time" – Lana Del Rey; "Ready to Let Go" – Cage the Elephant; "The Hype" – Twenty One Pilots; "Trampoline" – Shaed
Alternative Rock Artist of the Year	Best New Rock/Alternative Artist
Billie Eilish; Cage the Elephant; Imagine Dragons; Panic! at the Disco; Twenty One Pilots	Shaed; Dirty Honey; Dominic Fike; Matt Maeson; The Glorious Sons
Rock Song of the Year	Rock Artist of the Year
"Ghost" - Badflower; "Blue on Black" – Five Finger Death Punch; "Lo/Hi" – The Black Keys; "Monsters" – Shinedown; "S.O.S. (Sawed Off Shotgun)" – The Glorious Sons	Disturbed; Five Finger Death Punch; Godsmack; Greta Van Fleet; Shinedown
Country Song of the Year	Country Artist of the Year
"Beautiful Crazy" – Luke Combs; "Girl" – Maren Morris; "God's Country" – Blake Shelton; "The Ones That Didn't Make It Back Home" – Justin Moore; "Whiskey Glasses" – Morgan Wallen	Luke Combs; Carrie Underwood; Dan + Shay; Luke Bryan; Thomas Rhett
Best New Country Artist	Dance Song of the Year
Morgan Wallen; Jimmie Allen; Matt Stell; Riley Green; Runaway June	"Close to Me" - Ellie Goulding, Diplo and Swae Lee; "Body" – Loud Luxury featuring Brando; "Here with Me" – Marshmello featuring Chvrches; "Higher Love" – Kygo and Whitney Houston; "So Close" – NOTD and Felix Jaehn featuring Captain Cuts and Georgia Ku
Dance Artist of the Year	Hip-Hop Song of the Year
Marshmello; Diplo; Kygo; Loud Luxury; The Chainsmokers	"Suge" - DaBaby; "Going Bad" – Meek Mill featuring Drake; "Money in the Grave" – Drake featuring Rick Ross; "Money" – Cardi B; "Old Town Road" – Lil Nas X
Hip-Hop Artist of the Year	Best New Hip-Hop Artist
Drake; Cardi B; Lil Baby; Meek Mill; Travis Scott	DaBaby; City Girls; Lil Nas X; Lizzo; Megan Thee Stallion
R&B Song of the Year	R&B Artist of the Year
"No Guidance" – Chris Brown featuring Drake; "Before I Let Go" – Beyoncé; "Girls Need Love (Remix)" – Summer Walker and Drake; "Shot Clock" – Ella Mai; "Talk" – Khalid	H.E.R.; Chris Brown; Ella Mai; Khalid; Summer Walker
Best New R&B Artist	Latin Pop/Urban Song of the Year
Summer Walker; Ari Lennox; LightSkinKeisha; Nicole Bus; The Bonfyre	"Con Calma" – Daddy Yankee and Katy Perry featuring Snow; "Calma" – Pedro Capó and Alicia Keys featuring Farruko; "MIA" – Bad Bunny featuring Drake; "Qué Pretendes" – Bad Bunny and J Balvin; "Taki Taki" – DJ Snake featuring Selena Gomez, Ozuna and Cardi B
Latin Pop/Urban Artist of the Year	Best New Latin Pop/Urban Artist
Ozuna; Bad Bunny; Daddy Yankee; J Balvin; Maluma	Rosalía; Camilo; Guaynaa; Lunay; Sech
Regional Mexican Song of the Year	Regional Mexican Artist of the Year
"A Través Del Vaso" – Banda Los Sebastianes; "¿Por Qué Cambiaste De Opinión" – Calibre 50; "Con Todo Incluido" – La Addictiva Banda San José De Mesillas; "Encantadora" – El Fantasma; "Nada Nuevo" – Christian Nodal	Christian Nodal; Banda MS; Calibre 50; El Fantasma; La Arrolladora Banda El Limón
Producer of the Year	Songwriter of the Year
Finneas; Andrew Watt; Benny Blanco; Louis Bell; Max Martin	Louis Bell; Ashley Gorley; Finneas; Frank Dukes; Savan Kotecha
Best Fan Army (support by Taco Bell)	Best Lyrics
BTS – BTS Army; Agnez Mo – Agnation; Ariana Grande – Arianators; Justin Bieber – Beliebers; Camila Cabello – Camilizers; Harry Styles – Harries; Why Don't We – Limelights; Louis Tomlinson – Louies; Shawn Mendes – MendesArmy; Niall Horan – Niallers; Selena Gomez – Selenators; Taylor Swift – Swifties	Dan + Shay and Justin Bieber – "10,000 Hours"; Ariana Grande – "7 Rings"; Billie Eilish – "Bad Guy"; Ed Sheeran featuring Khalid – "Beautiful People"; Megan Thee Stallion featuring Nicki Minaj and Ty Dolla $ign – "Hot Girl Summer"; Lizzo – "Juice"; Selena Gomez – "Lose You to Love Me"; Halsey – "Nightmare"; Shawn Mendes and Camila Cabello – "Señorita"; Lewis Capaldi – "Someone You Loved"; Maren Morris – "The Bones"; Taylor Swift – "You Need to Calm Down"
Best Cover Song	Best Music Video
"Dancing with a Stranger" (Sam Smith and Normani) – 5 Seconds of Summer; "Black Dog" (Led Zeppelin) – Miley Cyrus; "Break Up with Your Girlfriend, I'm Bored" (Ariana Grande) – Lana Del Rey; "Can't Stop Loving You" (Phil Collins) – Taylor Swift; "Fooled Around and Fell in Love" (Elvin Bishop) – Miranda Lambert, Maren Morris, Elle King, Ashley McBryde, Tenille Townes and Caylee Hammack; "I'll Be There for You" (The Rembrandts) – Meghan Trainor; "Lover" (Taylor Swift) – Keith Urban; "Someone You Loved" (Lewis Capaldi) – Camila Cabello; "Sucker" (Jonas Brothers) – Halsey	"Boy With Luv" – BTS featuring Halsey; "7 Rings" – Ariana Grande; "Bad Guy" – Billie Eilish; "Con altura" – Rosalía, J Balvin and El Guincho; "Con Calma" – Daddy Yankee featuring Snow; "Dancing with a Stranger" – Sam Smith and Normani; "I Don't Care" – Ed Sheeran and Justin Bieber; "Kill This Love" – Blackpink; "Me!" – Taylor Swift featuring Brendon Urie; "Old Town Road" – Lil Nas X featuring Billy Ray Cyrus; "Señorita" – Shawn Mendes and Camila Cabello; "Sucker" – Jonas Brothers
Social Star Award	Best Remix
Asher Angel; Cody Orlove; Danielle Cohn; DeStorm Power; King Bach; Montana Tucker; Niki and Gabi; Piper Rockelle; Scotty Sire; Stephanie Poetri; The Moy Boys; Zoe Laverne	"Trampoline" – Shaed featuring Zayn; "Bad Guy" – Billie Eilish and Justin Bieber; "Con Calma" – Daddy Yankee and Katy Perry featuring Snow; "Good as Hell" – Lizzo featuring Ariana Grande; "Higher Love" – Kygo and Whitney Houston; "Lover" – Taylor Swift featuring Shawn Mendes; "Old Town Road" – Lil Nas X featuring Billy Ray Cyrus; "The Bones" – Maren Morris featuring Hozier; "Thotiana" - Blueface featuring Cardi B and YG; "Without Me" – Halsey featuring Juice Wrld
Favorite Tour Photographer	Favorite Music Video Choreography
Zack Caspary – Why Don't We; Adam Degross – Post Malone; Alfredo Flores – Ariana Grande; Andy DeLuca – 5 Seconds of Summer; Blair Caldwell – Normani; Daniel Prakopcyk – John Mayer; Jake Chamseddine – Panic! At the Disco; Josiah Van Dien – Shawn Mendes; Matty Vogel – Billie Eilish; Rays Corrupted Mind – Travis Scott; Zakary Walters – Ed Sheeran	"Kill This Love" (Blackpink) – Kyle Hanagami & Kiel Tutin; "7 Rings" (Ariana Grande) – Scott and Brian Nicholson; "How Do You Sleep?" (Sam Smith) – Parris Goebel; "Me!" (Taylor Swift featuring Brendon Urie) – Tyce Diorio; "Motivation" (Normani) – Sean Bankhead; "Señorita" (Shawn Mendes and Camila Cabello) – Calvit Hodge & Sara Bivens
Tour of the Year
Farewell Yellow Brick Road – Elton John
