= MTV Video Music Award for Best Choreography =

Annual music video award

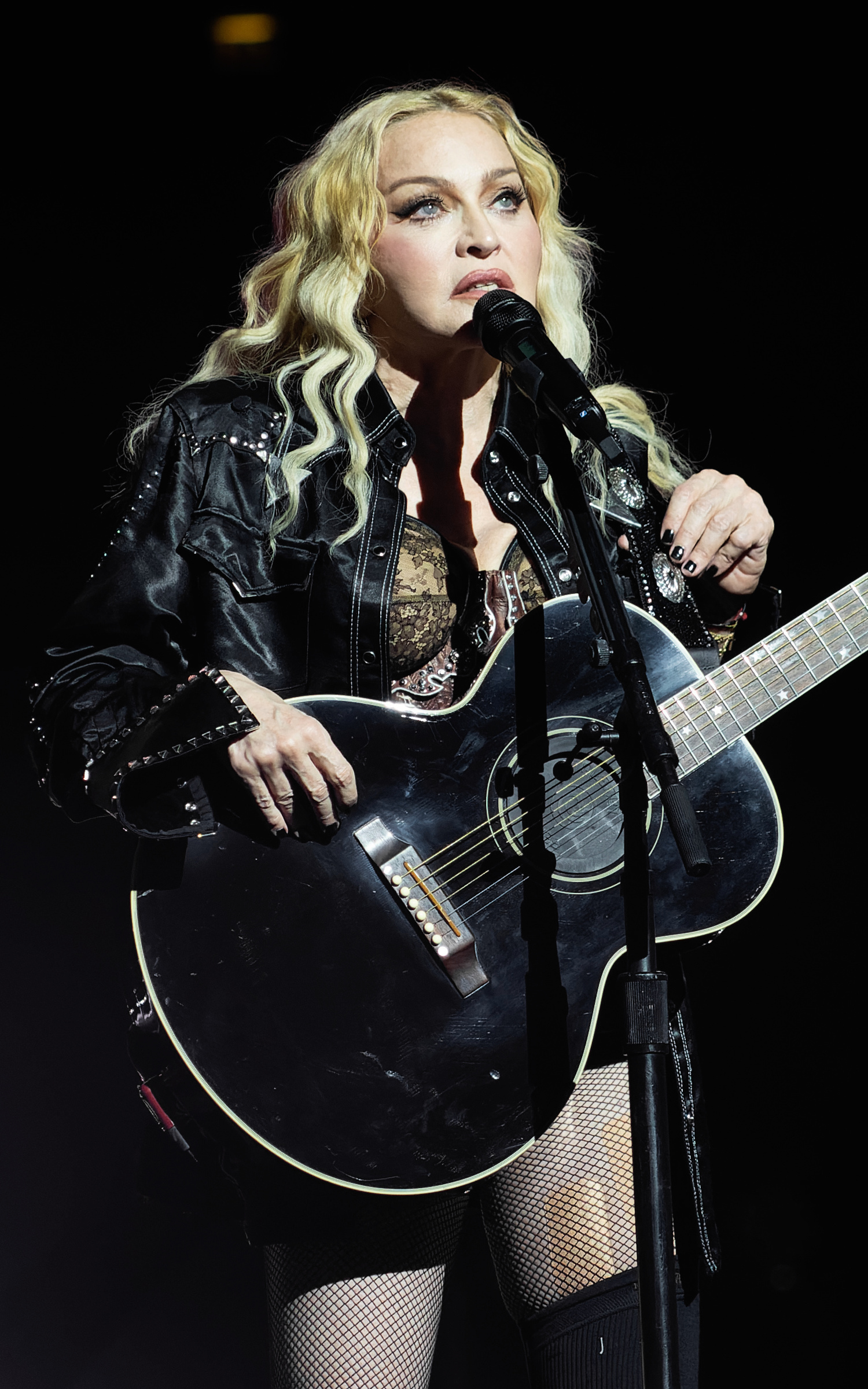
- Madonna is the most recent recipient for Confessions II – The Film.
- Awarded for: Choreography
- Country: United States
- Presented by: MTV
- First award: 1984
- Currently held by: Damien Jalet, Megan Lawson, Young Boy Dancing Group and Nicolas Huchard – Confessions II – The Film by Madonna (2026)

Highlights
- Most wins: Beyoncé & Janet Jackson (4); Frank Gatson (6)
- Most nominations: Beyoncé (13); Frank Gatson (11)
- Website: VMA website

The MTV Video Music Award for Best Choreography is a craft award given to the artist, the artist's manager, and choreographer of the music video. From 1984 to 2007, the full name of the award was Best Choreography in a Video. The biggest winner is Frank Gatson with six wins. Michael Rooney follows closely behind with five wins.

Frank Gatson is also the most nominated choreographer with eleven nominations. He is followed by Tina Landon with nine nominations (and yet only one win). The performers whose videos have won the most awards are Janet Jackson and Beyoncé, garnering a total of four Moonmen for choreography. Madonna's videos have received the most nominations with twelve.

Seven performers have won a Moonman in this category for their work choreographing or co-choreographing their own videos: Michael Jackson ("Thriller"), Prince ("Raspberry Beret"), Paula Abdul ("Straight Up"), Janet Jackson ("Rhythm Nation"), Madonna ("Ray of Light"), Shakira ("Hips Don't Lie"), Bruno Mars ("Treasure"), and OK Go ("I Won't Let You Down"). An additional ten other performers/groups have been nominated for their work choreographing their own videos: Toni Basil, Morris Day, Bobby Brown, MC Hammer, Marky Mark and the Funky Bunch, Quad City DJ's, Jason Kay, Janelle Monáe, Beyoncé and Solange. Abdul, a professional choreographer before launching her musical career, was nominated twice for choreographing two Janet Jackson videos, and won for "Nasty" before winning again for her own video for "Straight Up". Basil, who is also a professional choreographer, is the only other artist to have been nominated for work on both their own videos and other artists.

Actor Christopher Walken won this award in 2001 for helping choreograph the video for Fatboy Slim's "Weapon of Choice," in which he appears dancing. Similarly, Spike Jonze (as Richard Koufey) won this award in 1999 for his own dancing in Fatboy Slim's video "Praise You".

== Recipients ==
=== 1980s ===
| Year | Winner(s) | Work | Nominees | Ref. |
|---|---|---|---|---|
| 1984 | Michael Jackson and Michael Peters | "Thriller" (performed by Michael Jackson) | "Beast of Burden" – Toni Basil (performed by Bette Midler); "I'm Still Standing" – Arlene Phillips (performed by Elton John); "Over My Head" – Toni Basil (performed by Toni Basil); "She Works Hard for the Money" – Arlene Phillips (performed by Donna Summer) | |
| 1985 | David Atkins | "Sad Songs (Say So Much)" (performed by Elton John) | "The Glamorous Life" – Lesli Glatter (performed by Sheila E.); "Like a Virgin" – Madonna (performed by Madonna); "Material Girl" – Kenny Ortega (performed by Madonna); "Private Dancer" – Arlene Phillips (performed by Tina Turner); "When Doves Cry" – Prince (performed by Prince and The Revolution); "Would I Lie to You?" – Eddie Baytos (performed by Eurythmics) | |
| 1986 | Prince | "Raspberry Beret" (performed by Prince and The Revolution) | "Dress You Up" – Brad Jeffries (performed by Madonna); "Like a Virgin (Live)" – Brad Jeffries (performed by Madonna); "The Oak Tree" – Russell Clark and Morris Day (performed by Morris Day); "Sex as a Weapon" – Russell Clark (performed by Pat Benatar) | |
| 1987 | Paula Abdul | "Nasty" (performed by Janet Jackson) | "Higher Love" – Ed Love (performed by Steve Winwood); "Open Your Heart" – Brad Jeffries (performed by Madonna); "Walk Like an Egyptian" – Wendy Biller (performed by The Bangles); "When I Think of You" – Paula Abdul and Michael Kidd (performed by Janet Jackson) | |
| 1988 | Barry Lather | "The Pleasure Principle" (performed by Janet Jackson) | "Bad" – Michael Jackson, Gregg Burge and Jeffrey Daniel (performed by Michael Jackson); "U Got the Look" – Cat Glover (performed by Prince); "The Way You Make Me Feel" – Michael Jackson and Vincent Paterson (performed by Michael Jackson); "We'll Be Together" – Barry Lather (performed by Sting) | |
| 1989 | Paula Abdul | "Straight Up" (performed by Paula Abdul) | "Every Little Step" – Bobby Brown (performed by Bobby Brown); "Smooth Criminal" – Michael Jackson and Vincent Paterson (performed by Michael Jackson); "You Got It (The Right Stuff)" – Tyrone Procter (performed by New Kids on the Block) | |

=== 1990s ===
| Year | Winner(s) | Work | Nominees | Ref. |
|---|---|---|---|---|
| 1990 | Janet Jackson and Anthony Thomas | "Rhythm Nation" (performed by Janet Jackson) | "Opposites Attract" – Paula Abdul (performed by Paula Abdul); "U Can't Touch This" – MC Hammer and Ho Frat Hooo! (performed by MC Hammer); "Vogue" – Luis Camacho and Jose Gutierrez (performed by Madonna) | |
| 1991 | Jamale Graves | "Gonna Make You Sweat (Everybody Dance Now)" (performed by C+C Music Factory) | "Like a Virgin (Truth or Dare version)" – Vincent Paterson (performed by Madonna); "Love Will Never Do (Without You)" – Herb Ritts, Janet Jackson and Tina Landon (performed by Janet Jackson); "Pray (Jam the Hammer Mix)" – MC Hammer and Ho Frat Hooo! (performed by MC Hammer) | |
| 1992 | Frank Gatson, Travis Payne and LaVelle Smith Jr. | "My Lovin' (You're Never Gonna Get It)" (performed by En Vogue) | "Good Vibrations" – Marky Mark and the Funky Bunch (performed by Marky Mark and the Funky Bunch); "Holiday (Truth or Dare version)" – Vincent Paterson (performed by Madonna); "Too Legit to Quit" – Hammer (performed by Hammer) | |
| 1993 | Frank Gatson, LaVelle Smith Jr. and Travis Payne | "Free Your Mind" (performed by En Vogue) | "Jam" – Barry Lather (performed by Michael Jackson); "Real Love" – Leslie Segar (performed by Mary J. Blige); "That's the Way Love Goes" – Tina Landon (performed by Janet Jackson) | |
| 1994 | Frank Gatson and Randy Connor | "Whatta Man" (performed by Salt-n-Pepa with En Vogue) | "Cantaloop (Flip Fantasia)" – Toledo (performed by Us3); "If" – Tina Landon (performed by Janet Jackson); "Pumps and a Bump" – Hammer and Randi G. (performed by Hammer) | |
| 1995 | LaVelle Smith Jr., Tina Landon, Travis Payne and Sean Cheesman | "Scream" (performed by Michael Jackson and Janet Jackson) | "Baby" – Fatima Robinson (performed by Brandy); "Human Nature" – Jamie King (performed by Madonna); "My Love Is for Real" – Paula Abdul, Bill Bohl and Nancy O'Meara (performed by Paula Abdul); "None of Your Business" – Randy Connor (performed by Salt-n-Pepa) | |
| 1996 | Michael Rooney | "It's Oh So Quiet" (performed by Björk) | "C'mon N' Ride It (The Train)" – Quad City DJ's (performed by Quad City DJ's); "Fastlove" – Vaughan and Anthea (performed by George Michael); "Runaway" – Tina Landon (performed by Janet Jackson) | |
| 1997 | Peggy Hickey | "The New Pollution" (performed by Beck) | "Been There, Done That" – Fatima and Swoop (performed by Dr. Dre); "Men in Black" – Buddha Stretch (performed by Will Smith); "Sugar Water" – Michel Gondry (performed by Cibo Matto); "Virtual Insanity" – Jason Kay (performed by Jamiroquai) | |
| 1998 | Madonna and Jonas Åkerlund | "Ray of Light" (performed by Madonna) | "Gettin' Jiggy wit It" – Buddha Stretch (performed by Will Smith); "Put Your Hands Where My Eyes Could See" – Fatima Robinson (performed by Busta Rhymes); "We Trying to Stay Alive" – Henry and Crazy Legs (performed by Wyclef Jean featuring Refugee Allstars) | |
| 1999 | Richard Koufey and Michael Rooney | "Praise You" (performed by Fatboy Slim) | "...Baby One More Time" – Randy Connor (performed by Britney Spears); "Livin' la Vida Loca" – Tina Landon (performed by Ricky Martin); "Wild Wild West" – Fatima Robinson (performed by Will Smith featuring Dru Hill and Kool Moe Dee) | |

=== 2000s ===
| Year | Winner(s) | Work | Nominees | Ref. |
|---|---|---|---|---|
| 2000 | Darrin Henson | "Bye Bye Bye" (performed by NSYNC) | "So Pure" – Kevin O'Day and Anne White (performed by Alanis Morissette); "Try Again" – Fatima Robinson (performed by Aaliyah); "Waiting for Tonight" – Tina Landon (performed by Jennifer Lopez); "What a Girl Wants" – Tina Landon (performed by Christina Aguilera) | |
| 2001 | Michael Rooney, Spike Jonze and Christopher Walken | "Weapon of Choice" (performed by Fatboy Slim) | "All for You" – Shawnette Heard, Marty Kudelka and Roger Lee (performed by Janet Jackson); "Don't Tell Me" – Jamie King (performed by Madonna); "Lady Marmalade" – Tina Landon (performed by Christina Aguilera, Lil' Kim, Mýa and P!nk featuring Missy Elliott) | |
| 2002 | Michael Rooney | "Can't Get You Out of My Head" (performed by Kylie Minogue) | "Family Affair" – Fatima Robinson (performed by Mary J. Blige); "I'm a Slave 4 U" – Wade Robson (performed by Britney Spears); "U Don't Have to Call" – Rosero (performed by Usher) | |
| 2003 | Frank Gatson and LaVelle Smith Jr. | "Crazy in Love" (performed by Beyoncé featuring Jay-Z) | "Dirrty" – Jeri Slaughter (performed by Christina Aguilera featuring Redman)); "I'm Glad" – Jamie King and Jeffrey Hornaday (performed by Jennifer Lopez); "My Love Is Like...Wo" – Travis Payne (performed by Mýa); "Rock Your Body" – Marty Kudelka (performed by Justin Timberlake | |
| 2004 | Fatima Robinson | "Hey Mama" (performed by The Black Eyed Peas) | "I'm Really Hot" – Hi-Hat (performed by Missy Elliott); "Like Glue" – Tanisha Scott (performed by Sean Paul); "Naughty Girl" – Frank Gatson and LaVelle Smith Jr. (performed by Beyoncé); "Yeah!" – Devyne Stephens (performed by Usher featuring Ludacris and Lil Jon) | |
| 2005 | Kishaya Dudley | "Hollaback Girl" (performed by Gwen Stefani) | "1 Thing" – Jamaica Craft (performed by Amerie); "Get Right" – Richmond Talauega and Anthony Talauega (performed by Jennifer Lopez); "Helena" – Michael Rooney (performed by My Chemical Romance); "Lose Control" – Hi-Hat (performed by Missy Elliott featuring Ciara and Fatman Scoop) | |
| 2006 | Shakira | "Hips Don't Lie" (performed by Shakira featuring Wyclef Jean) | "Ain't No Other Man" – Jeri Slaughter (performed by Christina Aguilera); "Buttons" – Mikey Minden (performed by The Pussycat Dolls featuring Snoop Dogg); "Hung Up" – Stefanie Roos (performed by Madonna); "Temperature" – Tanisha Scott (performed by Sean Paul) | |
| 2007 | Marty Kudelka | "Let Me Talk to You/My Love" (performed by Justin Timberlake featuring T.I.) | "Beautiful Liar" – Frank Gatson (performed by Beyoncé and Shakira); "Like a Boy" – Jamaica Craft (performed by Ciara); "Tambourine" – Tanisha Scott and Jamaica Craft (performed by Eve featuring Swizz Beatz); "Wall to Wall" – Rich & Tone and Flii Stylz (performed by Chris Brown) | |
| 2008 | Michael Rooney | "Run" (performed by Gnarls Barkley) | "Chasing Pavements" – Marguerite Derricks (performed by Adele); "Forever" – Tone & Rich (performed by Chris Brown); "Kiss Kiss" – Flii Stylz (performed by Chris Brown featuring T-Pain); "When I Grow Up" – Robin Antin and Mikey Minden (performed by The Pussycat Dolls) | |
| 2009 | Frank Gatson and JaQuel Knight | "Single Ladies (Put a Ring on It)" (performed by Beyoncé) | "Circus" – Andre Fuentes (performed by Britney Spears); "Goodbye" – Jamaica Craft (performed by Kristinia DeBarge); "Jai Ho! (You Are My Destiny)" – Robin Antin and Mikey Minden (performed by A. R. Rahman and The Pussycat Dolls featuring Nicole Scherzinger); "Love Sex Magic" – Jamaica Craft and Marty Kudelka (performed by Ciara featuring Justin Timberlake) | |

=== 2010s ===
| Year | Winner(s) | Work | Nominees | Ref. |
|---|---|---|---|---|
| 2010 | Laurieann Gibson | "Bad Romance" (performed by Lady Gaga) | "OMG" – Aakomon "AJ" Jones (performed by Usher featuring will.i.am); "Telephone" – Laurieann Gibson (performed by Lady Gaga featuring Beyoncé); "Tightrope" – Janelle Monáe and the Memphis Jookin Community (performed by Janelle Monáe featuring Big Boi); "Video Phone (Extended Remix)" – Frank Gatson, Phlex and Bryan Tanaka (performed by Beyoncé featuring Lady Gaga) | |
| 2011 | Frank Gatson, Sheryl Murakami and Jeffrey Page | "Run the World (Girls)" (performed by Beyoncé) | "Judas" – Laurieann Gibson (performed by Lady Gaga); "The Lazy Song" – Bruno Mars and Poreotics (performed by Bruno Mars); "Party Rock Anthem" – Hokuto Konishi (performed by LMFAO featuring Lauren Bennett and GoonRock); "Till the World Ends" – Brian Friedman (performed by Britney Spears) | |
| 2012 | Anwar "Flii" Burton | "Turn Up the Music" (performed by Chris Brown) | "Countdown" – Danielle Polanco, Frank Gatson, Beyoncé and Anne Teresa De Keersmaeker (performed by Beyoncé); "Dance Again" – JR Taylor (performed by Jennifer Lopez featuring Pitbull); "Levels" – Richy Greenfield and Petro Papahadjopoulos (performed by Avicii); "Where Have You Been" – Hi-Hat (performed by Rihanna) | |
| 2013 | Bruno Mars | "Treasure" (performed by Bruno Mars) | "Body Party" – Jamaica Craft (performed by Ciara); "Fine China" – Richmond Talauega, Anthony Talauega and Anwar "Flii" Burton (performed by Chris Brown); "Live It Up" – J.R. Taylor and Beau Smart (performed by Jennifer Lopez featuring Pitbull); "#thatPOWER" – Fatima Robinson and Ryo Noguchi (performed by will.i.am featuring Justin Bieber) | |
| 2014 | Ryan Heffington | "Chandelier" (performed by Sia) | "Good Kisser" – Jamaica Craft and Todd Sams (performed by Usher); "Hideaway" – Ljuba Castot (performed by Kiesza); "Love Never Felt So Good" – Rich and Tone Talauega (performed by Michael Jackson and Justin Timberlake); "Partition" – Svetlana Kostantinova, Philippe Decouflé, Danielle Polanco and Frank Gatson (performed by Beyoncé); "Talk Dirty" – Amy Allen (performed by Jason Derulo featuring 2 Chainz) | |
| 2015 | OK Go, air:man and Mori Harano | "I Won't Let You Down" (performed by OK Go) | "7/11" – Beyoncé, Chris Grant and Gabriel Valenciano (performed by Beyoncé); "Don't" – Nappytabs (performed by Ed Sheeran); "Gold" – Ryan Heffington (performed by Chet Faker); "Never Catch Me" – Keone Madrid and Mari Madrid (performed by Flying Lotus featuring Kendrick Lamar) | |
| 2016 | Chris Grant, JaQuel Knight and Dana Foglia | "Formation" (performed by Beyoncé) | "Delilah" – Holly Blakey (performed by Florence + the Machine); M3LL155X – FKA Twigs (performed by FKA Twigs); "Sorry" – Chris Grant, JaQuel Knight, Dana Foglia, Anthony Burrell and Beyoncé (performed by Beyoncé); "WTF (Where They From)" – Hi-Hat (performed by Missy Elliott featuring Pharrell) | |
| 2017 | Teyana Taylor, Guapo, Matthew Pasterisa, Jae Blaze and Derek Watkins | "Fade" (performed by Kanye West) | "Down" – Sean Bankhead (performed by Fifth Harmony featuring Gucci Mane); "The Greatest" – Ryan Heffington (performed by Sia); "HUMBLE." – Dave Meyers (performed by Kendrick Lamar); "Side to Side" – Brian and Scott Nicholson (performed by Ariana Grande featuring Nicki Minaj) | |
| 2018 | Sherrie Silver | "This is America" (performed by Childish Gambino) | "Apeshit" – Sidi Larbi Cherkaoui and JaQuel Knight (performed by The Carters); "Filthy" – Marty Kudelka, AJ Harpold, Tracey Phillips and Ivan Koumaev (performed by Justin Timberlake); "Finesse (Remix)" – Phil Tayag and Bruno Mars (performed by Bruno Mars featuring Cardi B); "Havana" – Calvit Hodge, Sara Bivens and Galen Hooks (performed by Camila Cabello featuring Young Thug); "IDGAF" – Marion Motin (performed by Dua Lipa) | |
| 2019 | Charm La'Donna | "Con Altura" (performed by Rosalía and J Balvin featuring El Guincho) | "Almeda" – Maya Taylor and Solange Knowles (performed by Solange); "Boy with Luv" – Son Sungdeuk and Quick Crew (performed by BTS featuring Halsey); "Cellophane" – Kelly Yvonne (performed by FKA Twigs); "No New Friends" – Ryan Heffington (performed by LSD); "Señorita" – Calvit Hodge (performed by Shawn Mendes and Camila Cabello) | |

=== 2020s ===
| Year | Winner(s) | Work | Nominees | Ref. |
|---|---|---|---|---|
| 2020 | The Lab and Son Sung Deuk | "On" (performed by BTS) | "Bop" – DaniLeigh and Cherry (performed by DaBaby); "Honey Boo" – Kyle Hanagami (performed by CNCO and Natti Natasha); "Motivation" – Sean Bankhead (performed by Normani); "Physical" – Charm La'Donna (performed by Dua Lipa); "Rain on Me" – Richy Jackson (performed by Lady Gaga with Ariana Grande) | |
| 2021 | Paul Roberts | "Treat People with Kindness" (performed by Harry Styles) | "34+35" – Brian Nicholson and Scott Nicholson (performed by Ariana Grande); "Bad Habits" – Natricia Bernard (performed by Ed Sheeran); "Be Kind" – Dani Vitale (performed by Marshmello and Halsey); "Butter" – Son Sung Deuk with BHM Performance Directing Team (performed by BTS); "Shame Shame" – Nina McNeely (performed by Foo Fighters) | |
| 2022 | "Fullout Cortland" (Cortland Brown) | "Woman" (performed by Doja Cat) | "As It Was" – Yoann Bourgeois (performed by Harry Styles); "Industry Baby" – Sean Bankhead (performed by Lil Nas X and Jack Harlow); "Permission to Dance" – Big Hit Music Performance Directing Team (performed by BTS); "Tears in the Club" – Sean Bankhead and Zoï Tatopoulos (performed by FKA Twigs featuring The Weeknd); "Wild Side" – Sean Bankhead (performed by Normani featuring Cardi B) | |
| 2023 | Kiel Tutin, Sienna Lalau, Lee Jung (YGX) and Taryn Cheng (YGX) | "Pink Venom" (performed by Blackpink) | "Dance the Night" – Charm La'Donna (performed by Dua Lipa); "Her" – Sean Bankhead (performed by Megan Thee Stallion); "Middle of a Breakup" – Monika Felice Smith (performed by Panic! at the Disco); "Unholy" – (LA)HORDE (Marine Brutti, Jonathan Debrouwer and Arthur Harel) (performed by Sam Smith and Kim Petras); "Waffle House" – Jerry Reeve (performed by Jonas Brothers) | |
| 2024 | Charm La'Donna | "Houdini" (performed by Dua Lipa) | "Greedy" – Sean Bankhead (performed by Tate McRae); "Rockstar" – Sean Bankhead (performed by Lisa); "Rush" – Sergio Reis (performed by Troye Sivan); "Tiny Moves" – Margaret Qualley (performed by Bleachers); "Touching the Sky" – Felix 'Fefe' Burgos (performed by Rauw Alejandro) | |
| 2025 | Robbie Blue | "Anxiety" (performed by Doechii) | "Abracadabra" – Parris Goebel (performed by Lady Gaga); "Eusexua" – Zoï Tatopoulos (performed by FKA Twigs); "Not Like Us" – Charm La'Donna (performed by Kendrick Lamar); "Pretty Ugly" – Zoï Tatopoulos (performed by Zara Larsson); "Push 2 Start" – Lee-ché Janecke (performed by Tyla) | |
| 2026 | Damien Jalet, Megan Lawson, Young Boy Dancing Group and Nicolas Huchard | Confessions II – The Film (performed by Madonna) | "Dance No More" – Ryan Heffington (performed by Harry Styles); "The Fate of Ophelia" – Mandy Moore and Amanda Balen (performed by Taylor Swift); "Nobody's Girl" – (LA)HORDE, Arthur Harel, Marine Brutti, and Jonathan Debrouwer (performed by Tate McRae); "Pinky Up" – Grant Gilmore, Sohey Sugihara, Sergio Reis, and Zacc Milne (performed by Katseye); "Storm" – Damien Jalet (performed by Gener8ion featuring Yung Lean) | |

== Choreographer Statistics ==
=== Multiple wins ===
6 wins

- Frank Gatson

5 wins

- Michael Rooney

4 wins

- LaVelle Smith Jr.

3 wins

- Travis Payne

2 wins

- Charm La'Donna
- JaQuel Knight
- Paula Abdul

=== Multiple nominations ===
11 nominations

- Frank Gatson

9 nominations

- Tina Landon

8 nominations

- Fatima Robinson
- Sean Bankhead

7 nominations

- Jamaica Craft

6 nominations

- Michael Rooney

5 nominations

- Marty Kudelka
- Charm La'Donna
- LaVelle Smith Jr.
- Paula Abdul
- Rich and Tone Talauega

4 nominations

- Flii Stylz
- Hi-Hat
- JaQuel Knight
- MC Hammer
- Michael Jackson
- Ryan Heffington
- Travis Payne
- Vincent Paterson

3 nominations

- Tanisha Scott
- Jamie King
- Beyoncé
- Zoï Tatopoulos
- Laurieann Gibson
- Randy Connor
- Chris Grant
- Brad Jeffries
- Barry Lather
- Bruno Mars
- Mikey Minden
- Arlene Phillips
- Son Sungdeuk

2 nominations

- BHM Performance Directing Team
- Brian Nicholson and Scott Nicholson
- Buddha Stretch
- Calvit Hodge
- Dana Foglia
- Danielle Polanco
- Ho Frat Hooo!
- Janet Jackson
- Jeri Slaughter
- JR Taylor
- Madonna
- Prince
- Robin Antin
- Russell Clark
- Toni Basil

== Artist Statistics ==
=== Multiple wins ===
4 wins

- Beyoncé
- Janet Jackson (Note: 1 also as co-choreographer.)

3 wins

- En Vogue

2 wins

- Fatboy Slim
- Michael Jackson (Note: 1 also as co-choreographer.)
- Madonna (Note: 1 also as co-choreographer.)

=== Multiple nominations ===
13 nominations

- Beyoncé (Note: 1 as a featured artist; 1 with The Carters; 3 also as co-choreographer.)

12 nominations

- Madonna (Note: 1 also as choreographer; 1 also as co-choreographer.)

10 nominations

- Janet Jackson (Note: 2 also as co-choreographer.)

7 nominations

- Michael Jackson (Note: 4 also as co-choreographer.)

6 nominations

- Lady Gaga (Note: 1 as a featured artist.)

5 nominations

- Chris Brown
- Jennifer Lopez
- Justin Timberlake (Note: 1 as a featured artist.)

4 nominations

- Britney Spears
- BTS
- Christina Aguilera
- Ciara (Note: 1 as a featured artist.)
- Dua Lipa
- FKA Twigs (Note: 1 also as co-choreographer.)
- MC Hammer (Note: 1 also as choreographer; 3 also as co-choreographer.)
- Missy Elliott (Note: 1 as a featured artist.)
- Usher

3 nominations

- Ariana Grande
- Bruno Mars (Note: 1 also as choreographer; 2 also as co-choreographer.)
- En Vogue
- Kendrick Lamar
- Paula Abdul (Note: 2 also as choreographer; 1 also as co-choreographer.)
- Prince (Note: 2 also as choreographer.)
- The Pussycat Dolls
- Sia (Note: 1 with LSD.)
- Will Smith

2 nominations

- Camila Cabello
- Cardi B (Note: Both as a featured artist.)
- Ed Sheeran
- Elton John
- Fatboy Slim
- Halsey (Note: 1 as a featured artist.)
- Harry Styles
- Jay-Z (Note: 1 as a featured artist; 1 with The Carters)
- Mýa
- Normani
- Pitbull (Note: Both as a featured artist.)
- Salt-n-Pepa
- Sean Paul
- Shakira (Note: 1 also as choreographer.)
- will.i.am (Note: 1 as a featured artist.)
- Wyclef Jean (Note: 1 as a featured artist.)
