= Rachel Grae =

American pop singer and songwriter (born 2002)

- Born: July 5, 2002 (age 24); Livingston, New Jersey, U.S.
- Origin: New York City, U.S.
- Genre: Pop
- Occupations: Singer, songwriter
- Years active: 2021–present
- Website: rachelgrae.com

Rachel Grae (born Rachel Brooke Gorman; July 5, 2002) is an American pop singer and songwriter.

== Early life and education ==
Rachel Brooke Gorman was born on July 12, 2002, in Livingston, New Jersey, to Kenneth and Marci Gorman; she has an older sister, Jessica. She grew up in Livingston, on the outskirts of New York, attended Livingston High School, and became interested in music at a young age. In high school, she decided to focus on music as a career.

== Career ==
In late 2020, Rachel Grae started posting performance videos anonymously on TikTok. When writing music, she embraces the imperfections in life and vulnerability in all its forms, naming other young pop artists like Billie Eilish, Olivia Rodrigo, and Tate McRae as inspiration in her songwriting, and drawing vocal comparisons to artists like Adele, Kelly Clarkson, and Demi Lovato. She likes to write about topics that she normally wouldn't speak about because it allows her to heal throughout the process. Her favorite part of writing is turning an ugly situation into something beautiful. When a topic feels heavy, that's an indication that her emotions will shine through as more real and genuine feelings, which she hopes can help listeners process similar emotions. She has been described as “raw and honest,” in her "confessional heart songs...that go right for the emotional core". She is also known for engaging her fanbase, which she calls her “friendbase,” via TikTok and Instagram LIVE when writing and creating music.

=== Music ===
Grae debuted with her single, Bad Timing, in mid 2021 on Groundwork Records, which landed on the largest billboard in Times Square in partnership with Spotify and Little Kids Rock (now Music Will).

In March 2022, Grae was one of eight participants in the inaugural season of the TikTok, Pepsi, and ViacomCBS television show Becoming A Popstar. She was named the series’ first fan-favorite pick of the week for her video Jersey by judges Joe Jonas, Becky G, and Sean Bankhead.

In May 2022, Grae released her viral hit It'll Be Okay, which was featured prominently in an episode of Love Island UK. She quickly followed up the release with Friend Like Me, after another viral moment in June of her improvising a melody while cooking eggs in her kitchen. The back-to-back notable tracks caught the eye of Rolling Stone, who then released a feature focusing on her 2021 release, Outsider.

She subsequently appeared live on KTLA 5 News, where she discussed her music career and the process behind promoting her music on TikTok; she also performed Colorblind on the show. A short time later, she was featured on a handful of tracks with cover group Boyce Avenue.

In early 2023, a live performance of her song “How Dare You” was featured by The Late Show with Stephen Colbert. The song was also featured in the closing sequence of an episode of the 2023 winter series of Love Island UK. March and April 2023 saw Grae embark on her first extended tour as an artist, starting in Los Angeles, covering both coasts, and ending in Minneapolis.

On Mother's Day weekend 2023, Grae released “the most vulnerable song” about her relationship with her mom titled “Daughter,” which was covered by People Magazine. Later in 2023, on Stand Up to Cancer Day, Grae released “Hope You're Proud,” an emotional ode to loss.

== Discography ==
=== Singles ===
Title	Release date	Label
Bad Timing	May 14, 2021	Groundwork Records
Lived It Twice	June 25, 2021	Groundwork Records
Outsider	November 5, 2021	Groundwork Records
How to Be Alone	March 4, 2022	Boom.Records
Good Side	April 2, 2022	Boom.Records
It'll Be Okay	May 20, 2022	FRTYFVE
Friend Like Me	June 24, 2022	FRTYFVE
I Can't Make You Love Me (with Boyce Avenue)	September 16, 2022	3 Peace Records
Right Person Right Time	September 16, 2022	FRTYFVE
Let It Go (with Boyce Avenue)	October 14, 2022	3 Peace Records
Right Person Right Time (Acoustic)	October 21, 2022	FRTYFVE
Colorblind	November 11, 2022	FRTYFVE
True Colors (with Boyce Avenue)	November 25, 2022	3 Peace Records
How Dare You	January 27, 2023	FRTYFVE
Love I've Been Jealous Of	March 24, 2023	FRTYFVE
Daughter	May 12, 2023	FRTYFVE
You Suck	June 23, 2023	FRTYFVE
Hope You're Proud	September 28, 2023	FRTYFVE
Love Me Like the First Time	October 20, 2023	FRTYFVE
