= Amira Unplugged =

American rapper

- Born: Amira Daugherty; Stone Mountain, Georgia, U.S.
- Education: Georgia State University; Agnes Scott College
- Years active: 2021–present

TikTok information
- Page: amiraunplugged
- Followers: 141.1K
- Last updated: October 13, 2025

Amira Daugherty-Thomas, known by her artist name Amira Unplugged, is an American singer, songwriter, rapper, and producer. Known for her genre bending style, Amira combines elements of country-western, soul, hip-hop, rock, and orchestral music.

== Early life and education ==
Daugherty was born in Stone Mountain, Georgia, where she grew up in a musical household. Her parents encouraged her to join band and orchestra in school, where she played the clarinet and violin.

Daugherty earned an associate degree in criminal justice from Georgia State University at age 18. In 2019 she graduated with a B.A. in political science from Agnes Scott College, where she became the first Muslim president of the college's Student Government Association. She initially intended to attend law school after graduating from Agnes Scott, but withdrew her application after the COVID-19 pandemic began.

== Musical career ==
Daugherty began to post videos of her singing to TikTok, Instagram, and YouTube during the COVID-19 pandemic. She used ASL in her videos, to better connect with deaf viewers. Due to the online response, she was invited to audition for American Idol, where she performed Stand Up by Cynthia Erivo and a spoken word piece called "Anxiety Eviction". However, despite receiving three yeses from the judges, her audition was not broadcast on the show. She was also invited to participate in MTV's Becoming A Popstar, which she ultimately placed second in.

In October 2022 Daugherty took part in Pepsi's Music Lab. She released her first official single, "Work Till The Mornin'", the following month. Her second single, "Help Me Help You Out," released on February 3, 2023.

In 2023, Daugherty recorded a cover of "The Sound of Silence" for an AT&T ad presenting a football helmet designed for deaf and hard-of-hearing players.

She has cited AC/DC, Earth, Wind & Fire, and Michael Jackson as musical inspirations.

== Personal life ==
Daugherty is Muslim and part of the Deaf community, being completely deaf in her left ear.
