= Becoming a Popstar =

American music competition

- Genre: Reality competition
- Directed by: Iren Brown
- Judges: Joe Jonas; Becky G; Sean Bankhead
- Country of origin: United States
- Original language: English
- No. of seasons: 1
- No. of episodes: 5

Production
- Executive producers: Jesse Collins; Dionne Harmon; Neal Konstantini; Madison Merritt; Joe Jonas; Becky G
- Production companies: MTV Entertainment Studios; Pepsi Productions; Jesse Collins Entertainment; Velocity; B Yourself Productions

Original release
- Network: MTV
- Release: March 24 – April 21, 2022

Becoming a Popstar is an American music competition television series produced by Jesse Collins Entertainment and Velocity. It premiered on MTV on March 24, 2022. Joe Jonas, Becky G, and Sean Bankhead served as judges for the series.

The first season concluded its run on April 21, 2022, with Samy Hawk winning.

== Format ==
The 5-episode series features aspiring TikTok singer-songwriter contestants that create original songs and one-minute music videos. In the end, two contestants are chosen to compete in the finale and win the "popstar" title, a monetary prize of $100,000 and a feature in a Pepsi commercial, expected to air during the 2022 MTV Video Music Awards.

== Contestants ==
- Alexi Blue
- Amira Daugherty
- Bryan Vaulx Jr.
- Kyle Morris
- Lexie Hayden
- Lynnea Moorer
- Rachel Grae
- Samy Hawk

== Episodes ==
| No. | Title | Original release date | U.S. viewers (millions) |
|---|---|---|---|
| 1 | "Rep Your City" | March 24, 2022 | N/A |
| 2 | "Duets" | March 31, 2022 | 0.06 |
| 3 | "Dance" | April 7, 2022 | 0.09 |
| 4 | "Save the Music" | April 14, 2022 | 0.07 |
| 5 | "Finale" | April 21, 2022 | 0.08 |
