= Barry Lather =

American choreographer, creative director, producer, and dancer

- Born: August 16, 1966 (age 60); Albany, New York
- Occupations: Choreographer, creative director, producer
- Years active: 1985–present
- Known for: "The Pleasure Principle" music video

Barry Lather (born August 16, 1966) is an American creative director, choreographer, producer, and dancer based in Minneapolis, Minnesota, and Los Angeles, California.

== Early life ==
Lather was born on August 16, 1966, in Albany, New York. He grew up in a family of five children in Atlanta, Georgia. His mother Joan was a dance instructor and his father George ran a dancewear business. In 1985, after graduating high school, Lather moved to Los Angeles and trained on scholarship at Joe Tremaine's Dance Center.

== Career ==
Lather's first entertainment industry dancing project was the 1985 Michael Jackson 3-D film Captain EO. He continued performing in TV series like Fame and Dancin' to the Hits, commercials, and music videos such as Janet Jackson's "Nasty" and "When I Think of You." In 1987, Lather choreographed for Janet Jackson for the American Music Awards and Grammy Awards, and later for "The Pleasure Principle" music video, which won a Billboard Music Award and an MTV Award for Best Choreography. Other artists he worked choreography for included Prince, Michael Jackson, Paula Abdul, George Michael, Sting, Britney Spears, Lionel Richie and Sheryl Crow. In 1996, Barry was co-choreographer for the acclaimed Michael Jackson's short film Ghost, directed by Stan Winston, and also choreographed the 68th Academy Awards. In 1998, Barry choreographed the NFL Super Bowl Halftime Show featuring superstar Motown artists. In 2001, Barry received a prestigious Emmy Award nomination for his work on the Miss America Pageant.

Lather also recorded an album as a solo artist with the label Atlantic Records/WEA in 1990, titled Turn Me Loose; it was produced by Carl Sturken and Evan Rogers of Rythm Syndicate, and spawned a music video for the single, "Love In The Third Degree".

In the early 2000s, Lather began directing large productions such as world tours and live television performances for artists including Usher, Ciara, Rihanna, Justin Bieber, Mariah Carey, Gwen Stefani, The Pussycat Dolls, Paula Abdul, Trey Songz and Miguel. Barry was the creative director for Usher's The Truth Tour, The OMG Tour and the Showtime special "One Night One Star" live from Puerto Rico. Lather's ice show production choreography includes shows for Paramount Parks and Disney and working with Olympic athletes like Kristi Yamaguchi, Scott Hamilton, and Katarina Witt. In late 2008, Lather directed and choreographed Donny and Marie Osmond's Las Vegas Show at the Flamingo Hotel. In 2010, he directed Usher's performances on So You Think You Can Dance, Britain's Got Talent, X Factor, and the BET Awards 2010.

In 2011 and 2012, he worked on the hybrid Freestyle Motocross show "Nuclear Cowboyz" tour. In 2014, he was creative director for performances by Echosmith, Nick Jonas, The Vamps, and Meghan Trainor at the Nickelodeon Halo Awards...and later performances for The Kid's Choice Awards. For the 2016 Grammys, Lather directed Carrie Underwood and Sam Hunt's live mashup performance of "Heartbeat" and "Take Your Time." In early 2018, Lather directed & choreographed the grand opening event for Qiddiya in Saudi Arabia and in 2019 the ground breaking ceremony of the ancient city of Diriyah outside of Riyadh. In 2019, Barry was the creative producer for American Idol's season finale show. Barry directed & choreographed two Celebrity Cruise Line shows, a classic rock production called Rockumentary that launched in Greece, and later "Residency" which opened in 2023. Barry directed international superstar Robbie Williams Las Vegas Residency Show at The Wynn, and Carrie Underwood's Residency Show "Reflection" at ResortsWorld in Vegas, which ran for 4 years consisting of 72 shows. Barry creative directed Carrie Underwood's Stagecoach show production in 2022. Recently, Barry worked on Hans Zimmer's European Tours in 2022-2025, directed and co-designed iconic rocker John Fogerty's tour and directed Carrie Underwood's The Denim & Rhinestones Tour. Barry creative directed & choreographed Gala Games Live Events in Las Vegas, Los Angeles & Malta with Volo Events. In 2025 Barry directed Carrie Underwood's New Year's Rockin' Eve performance in the heart of New York City's Time Square....and John Fogerty's Legacy Tour which kicked off at the iconic Beacon Theater in NYC.

== Awards ==
| Year | Film awards / critics | Award | Work | Result | Ref |
|---|---|---|---|---|---|
| 1988 | MTV Video Music Awards | Best Choreography | "The Pleasure Principle" music video | Won | |
| 1997 | Fosse Awards | Best Music Video | "Ghosts" - Michael Jackson | Won | |
| 2001 | Emmys | Outstanding Choreography | Miss America 2000 | Nominated | |
| 2016 | Pollstar | Most Creative Stage Production | Storyteller Tour: Stories in the Round | Nominated | |

== Selected directing and choreography ==
=== TV and film ===
- 1992: Roundhouse (3 seasons)
- 1993: Super Mario Bros.
- 1995: Michael Jackson: One Night Only HBO Special
- 1996: Michael Jackson's Ghosts
- 1996: 68th Academy Awards
- 1997: Vegas Vacation
- 1997: Melinda: First Lady of Magic
- 1998: Blues Brothers 2000
- 2000-2018: Miss America Pageant
- 2000-2001: Nikki (7 episodes)
- 2002: Death to Smoochy
- 2002: Unconditional Love
- 1998-2002: The Drew Carey Show (2 episodes)
- 2008: Good Girl Gone Bad Live Rihanna
- 2009: TV Special Jennifer Hudson
- 2012: Duets (1 season)
- 2014: Nickelodeon HALO Awards
- 2019: American Idol Season Finale (Creative Producer)
- 2021: Carrie Underwood Live from the Ryman
- 2022: American Idol (Creative Producer)

=== Music videos ===
- 1987: "The Pleasure Principle" - Janet Jackson
- 1987: "We'll Be Together" - Sting
- 1987: "Diamonds" - Herb Alpert
- 1988: "Kiss" - Tom Jones
- 1989: "Electric Youth" - Debbie Gibson
- 1989: "Batdance" - Prince
- 1992: "Jam" - Michael Jackson
- 1992: "My Destiny" - Lionel Richie
- 1995: "Crazy Cool" - Paula Abdul
- 1996: "If It Makes You Happy" - Sheryl Crow
- 1996: "The Only Thing That Looks Good on Me Is You" - Bryan Adams
- 1996: "Let's Make a Night to Remember" - Bryan Adams

=== Live performances and award shows ===
- 1987: 29th Annual Grammy Awards (Janet Jackson)
- 1987: American Music Awards (Janet Jackson)
- 1998: Super Bowl Halftime Special / Tribute to Motown
- 2003: MTV Video Music Awards (P Diddy)
- 2004: BET Awards (Usher)
- 2004: MTV Video Music Awards (Usher)
- 2004: American Music Awards (Usher & Alicia Keys)
- 2005: Fashion Rocks (Gwen Stefani, Pharrell, P. Diddy)
- 2007: BET Awards - (Ciara)
- 2008: BET Awards, American Music Awards, Fashion Rocks (Rihanna)
- 2008: BET Awards (Usher)
- 2008: Donny & Marie Osmond Las Vegas Residency Show at the Flamingo
- 2009: BET Awards (Keri Hilson)
- 2010: MTV Video Music Awards (Usher "OMG" performance)
- 2011-2015: Country Music Awards (Carrie Underwood, Blake Shelton, Luke Bryan, Kenny Chesney)
- 2011: 2011 Latin Grammy Awards (Usher, Romeo Santos)
- 2011: American Music Awards (Justin Bieber)
- 2011: American Idol performance (Nicole Scherzinger)
- 2012: Divas (Ciara)
- 2012-13: BET Award performances (Miguel)
- 2013: Grammy Awards (Miguel & Wiz Khalifa)
- 2013: Dancing with the Stars performance (Demi Lovato)
- 2013: Billboard Awards (Miguel)
- 2015: Kid's Choice Awards (Nick Jonas)
- 2015: CMT Awards (Carrie Underwood)
- 2016: ACMs, CMA, CMT Award performances (Carrie Underwood)
- 2017: BET Awards (Trey Songz)
- 2018: 2018 Radio Disney Music Awards (Carrie Underwood)
- 2018: "Qiddiya" Live Opening Ceremony in Saudi Arabia
- 2018: MTV Video Music Awards (Logic)
- 2018: ACMs, CMT Fest, CMA, American Music Awards - (Carrie Underwood)
- 2019: Robbie Williams "Live in Las Vegas" Residency show at The Wynn
- 2019: British Summer Time Hyde Park - Robbie Williams
- 2019: Nu Skin Corporate Event
- 2019: "Diriyah" Opening Ceremony Event in Saudi Arabia
- 2020: "Rockumentary" - Live Show / Celebrity Cruises
- 2021: American Music Awards - (Jason Aldean & Carrie Underwood)
- 2021: "Reflection" Las Vegas Residency Show at Resortsworld - Carrie Underwood
- 2021: Gala Live Event Las Vegas / Volo Events
- 2022: Stagecoach - (Carrie Underwood)
- 2022: Gala Live Event Los Angeles "Super Bowl" & Malta / Volo Events
- 2023: "Residency" - Live Show / Celebrity Cruises
- 2025: New Year's Rockin' Eve - Carrie Underwood

=== Tours ===
- 1988-1989: The Faith Tour - George Michael
- 1991: Under My Spell Tour - Paula Abdul
- 2001-2002: Dream Within a Dream Tour - Britney Spears
- 2004: The Truth Tour - Usher
- 2006: PCD World Tour - The Pussycat Dolls
- 2006: The Emancipation of MiMi Tour - Mariah Carey
- 2006: L.O.V.E. Tour - Ashlee Simpson
- 2007: Dancing with the Stars Tour
- 2007: Girl Gone Bad Tour - Rihanna
- 2010: OMG Tour - Usher
- 2012: John Fogerty Tour
- 2012: Kaleidoscope Dream Tour - Miguel
- 2014: The Elusive Chanteuse Tour - Mariah Carey
- 2014: John Fogerty 1969 Tour
- 2015: Jackie Tour - Ciara
- 2015: Between the Sheets Tour - Trey Songz
- 2016: The Storyteller Tour - Carrie Underwood
- 2017: The Total Package Tour - Paula Abdul
- 2019: Straight Up Paula Tour - Paula Abdul
- 2019: The Cry Pretty Tour 360 - Carrie Underwood
- 2022: Hans Zimmer European Tour
- 2022: The Denim & Rhinestones Tour - Carrie Underwood
- 2025: John Fogerty Legacy Tour
- 2025: Hans Zimmer "The Next Level" Tour
