= OK, I'm Sick =

Studio album by Badflower
- Released: February 22, 2019
- Studio: Ocean Studios (Burbank)
- Length: 55:27
- Label: Big Machine; John Varvatos
- Producer: Scott Borchetta (exec.); John Varvatos (exec.); Noah Shain; Josh Katz

Badflower chronology
Temper (2016)	OK, I'm Sick (2019)	This Is How the World Ends (2021)

Singles from OK, I'm Sick
- 1. "Ghost" Released: June 8, 2018; 2. "x ANA x" Released: November 16, 2018; 3. "Heroin" Released: December 6, 2018; 4. "Promise Me" Released: February 15, 2019; 5. "The Jester" Released: May 24, 2019

Professional ratings
Review scores
Source	Rating
Newsday	3/4 stars
Substream Magazine	5/5 stars

OK, I'm Sick is the debut studio album by the American rock band Badflower, released on February 22, 2019. The album debuted at number 140 on the US Billboard 200. Loudwire named it one of the 50 best rock albums of 2019.

== History ==
Badflower released the album's lead single, "Ghost", on June 8, 2018. On November 1, 2018, Badflower announced the album with a release date of February 22, 2019.

The second single, "x ANA x", was released on November 16, 2018, with the third single, "Heroin", following on December 6, 2018. The fourth single, "Promise Me", was released on February 15, 2019.

== Track listing ==
All tracks are written by Badflower and Noah Shain except "Heroin", written by Badflower. All tracks are produced by Noah Shain except "Heroin", produced by Josh Katz.

OK, I'm Sick track listing
No.	Title	Length
1.	"x ANA x"	4:36
2.	"The Jester"	4:05
3.	"Ghost"	4:19
4.	"We're in Love"	4:02
5.	"Promise Me"	3:49
6.	"Daddy"	4:12
7.	"24"	4:39
8.	"Heroin"	4:41
9.	"Die"	3:05
10.	"Murder Games"	4:30
11.	"Girlfriend"	3:07
12.	"Wide Eyes"	3:58
13.	"Cry"	6:24
Total length:		55:27

Walmart edition bonus track
No.	Title	Length
14.	"Ghost" (acoustic)	4:29
Total length:		59:56

== Personnel ==
Adapted credits from the liner and inlay notes of OK, I'm Sick.

Badflower

- Josh Katz – lead vocals, rhythm guitar
- Joey Morrow – lead guitar, backing vocals
- Alex Espiritu – bass
- Anthony Sonetti – drums

Production

- Chris Lord-Alge – mixing
- Brian Judd – assistant mixing
- Adam Chagnon – additional engineering
- Ted Jensen – mastering

Artwork

- Tyler Shields – photographer
- Sandi Spika Borchetta – art direction
- Justin Ford – art direction, graphic design
- John Varvatos – wardrobe
- Rian Rettino (cover image), Jessica Erlandsen (interior image) – grooming

== Charts ==
Chart performance for OK, I'm Sick
Chart (2019)	Peak position
US Billboard 200	140
US Top Alternative Albums (Billboard)	10
US Top Rock Albums (Billboard)	22
