= Badflower =

American rock band

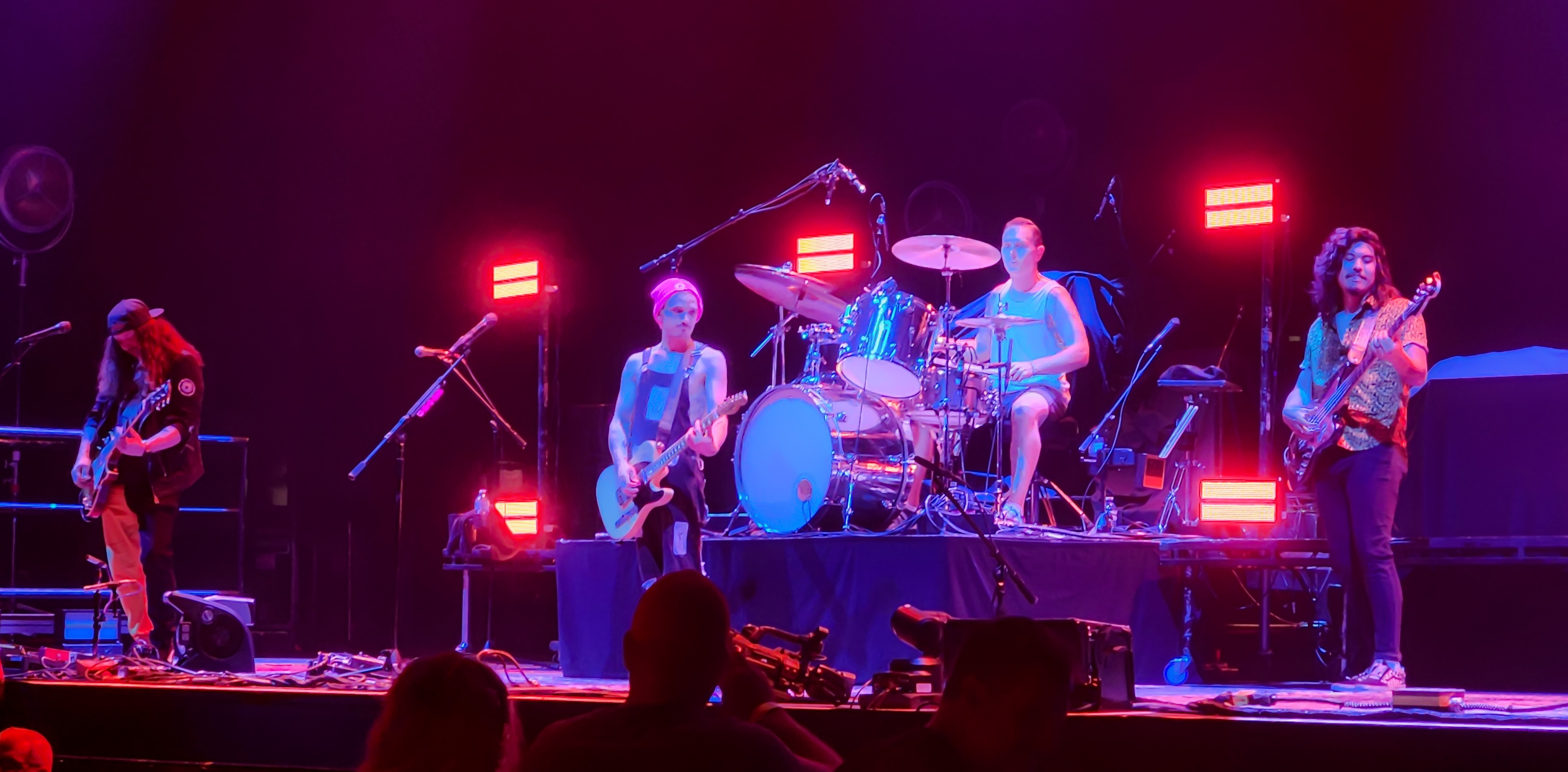
- Badflower performing in 2023

Background information
- Origin: Los Angeles, California, U.S.
- Genres: Hard rock; pop rock; alternative rock; post-grunge
- Years active: 2013–present
- Label: Blue Highway Records
- Members: Josh Katz; Joey Morrow; Anthony Sonetti; Alex Espiritu
- Website: badflowermusic.com

Badflower is an American rock band founded in Los Angeles. The band is composed of singer/guitarist Josh Katz, lead guitarist Joey Morrow, bass guitarist Alex Espiritu and drummer Anthony Sonetti. The band is signed to Big Machine / John Varvatos Records and was named Artist of the Week by Apple Music after the release of their EP Temper in 2016. Their debut studio album, OK, I'm Sick, was released on February 22, 2019. Their second album, This Is How the World Ends, was released on September 24, 2021.

== History ==
=== Formation and indie label releases (2010s–2014) ===
Badflower's earliest incarnation, the Cartunes, formed in 2010, when music school students, Josh Katz and Joey Morrow, met at their Hollywood apartment building. The pair moved in together, and began writing songs for their 5-piece band. They released a self produced EP in 2011 but after losing their bass player and rhythm guitarist, reformed as rock band Badflower, recruiting Espiritu and Sonetti to round out their ranks. They played several shows in Los Angeles including a weekly residency at The Key Club and gained attention from satellite radio personality and former NSYNC member Lance Bass. After a performance at The Troubadour, opening for Kongos, the band signed with former independent record label Hundred Handed and began recording their first music release.

=== Major label signing and Temper EP (2015–2016) ===
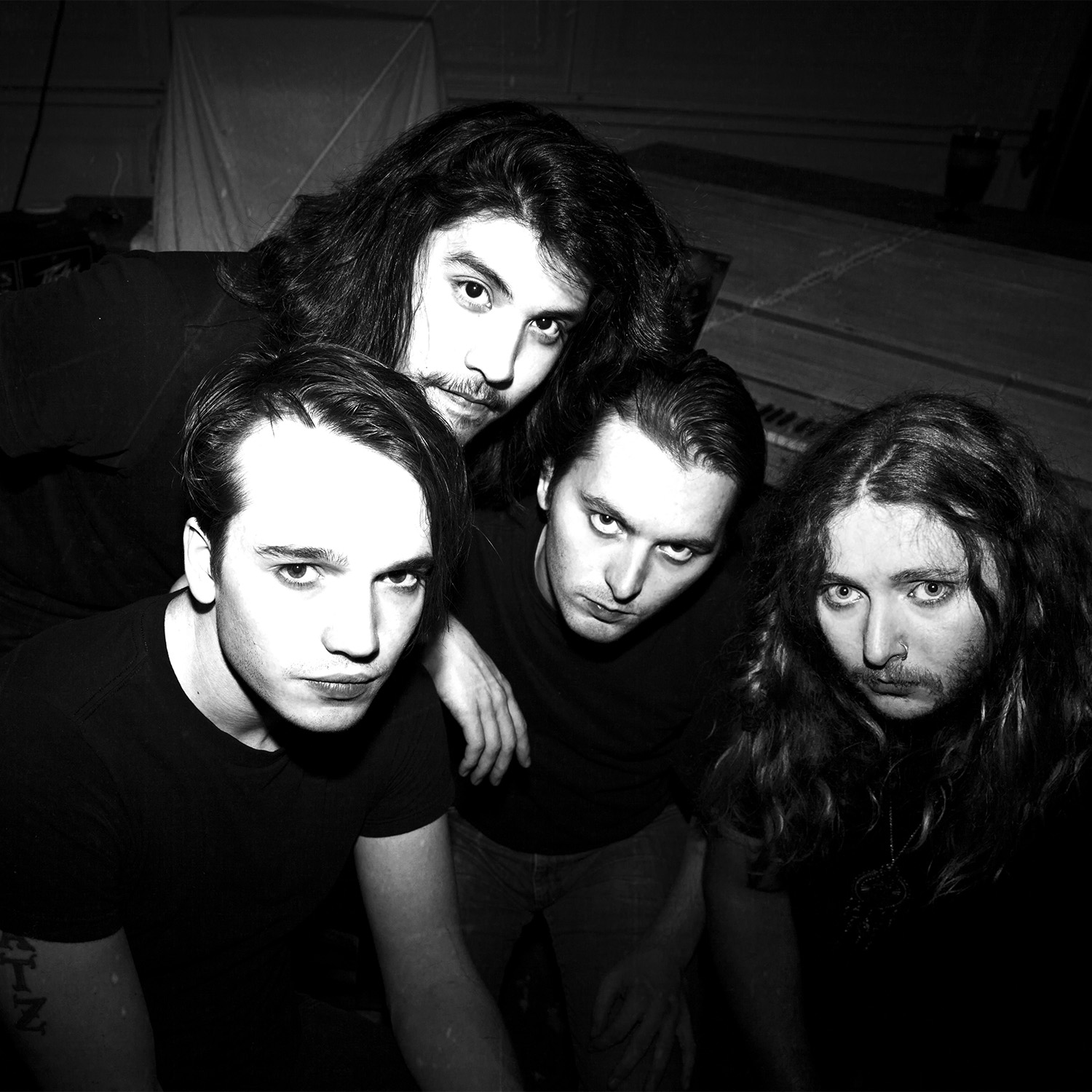
Group photo of Badflower

Badflower released their debut single "Soap" via Hundred Handed records on March 4, 2015, and debuted its music video on Loudwire the same day. Shortly after the release the band flew to the United Kingdom to support Australian pop duo The Veronicas and played to sold out venues including London's Heaven. Then, upon returning to the US, the band headed straight back on tour to play several showcases in Austin, Texas for SXSW and South by So What?! in Grand Prairie, Texas supporting Circa Survive. A demo version of the band's song "Animal" was also used in record label executive John Varvatos's show during New York Fashion Week. The band was then flown out to New York City to showcase for Varvatos and head executives at Republic Records with the prospect of making a deal. After the performance, the label immediately began negotiations which included a buy-out from their previous deal with Hundred Handed.

Impatient with the negotiations, the band took it upon themselves to begin recording an album in their garage. On March 10 the band signed with John Varvatos / Republic Records. When the conversation about making an album began, the band confessed they had already begun making it in their garage and submitted a nearly complete version of "Temper" to the label. To the band's surprise, the label loved the self-produced collection and began preparing to release the unanimous favorite, "Animal," as the first single. "Animal" was premiered on Guitar World website and released on September 1, 2016. Following the release of the single, the band performed across the US in support of Billy Talent on the "Afraid of Heights" tour in September, 16. While on tour, the band gained attention from active rock radio stations and top programmers for iTunes and Apple Music.

The band's debut EP, Temper dropped on November 4, 2016 and Badflower was named Apple Music's Artist of the week. "Good, Old-Fashioned Rock n' Roll May Have Just Made a Modern Comeback," declares Nylon Magazine Active and Alternative rock radio began spinning "Animal" regularly and was added by stations such as SiriusXM Octane and was voted #1 on KROQ locals only for multiple weeks in a row. iTunes named "Animal" among the best rock songs and Temper among best rock albums of 2016. A few songs from Temper were also featured on Spotify's most streamed music playlists including New Music Friday Following the buzz, Badflower was asked to headline KCRW's School night in West Hollywood, California on December 19, 2016. The band recruited friend and Big Bang Theory actor Johnny Galecki to join them on stage to close the show. On December 31 "Animal" entered into the Billboard Mainstream Rock Chart and peaked at number 28. In addition, by March 2017 their single "Animal" from Temper had cracked at 1 million Spotify streams and as of 2018 has garnered them over 2,000,000 streams. Soon after the release of Temper EP on December 12, 2016, Badflower began touring to promote the release.

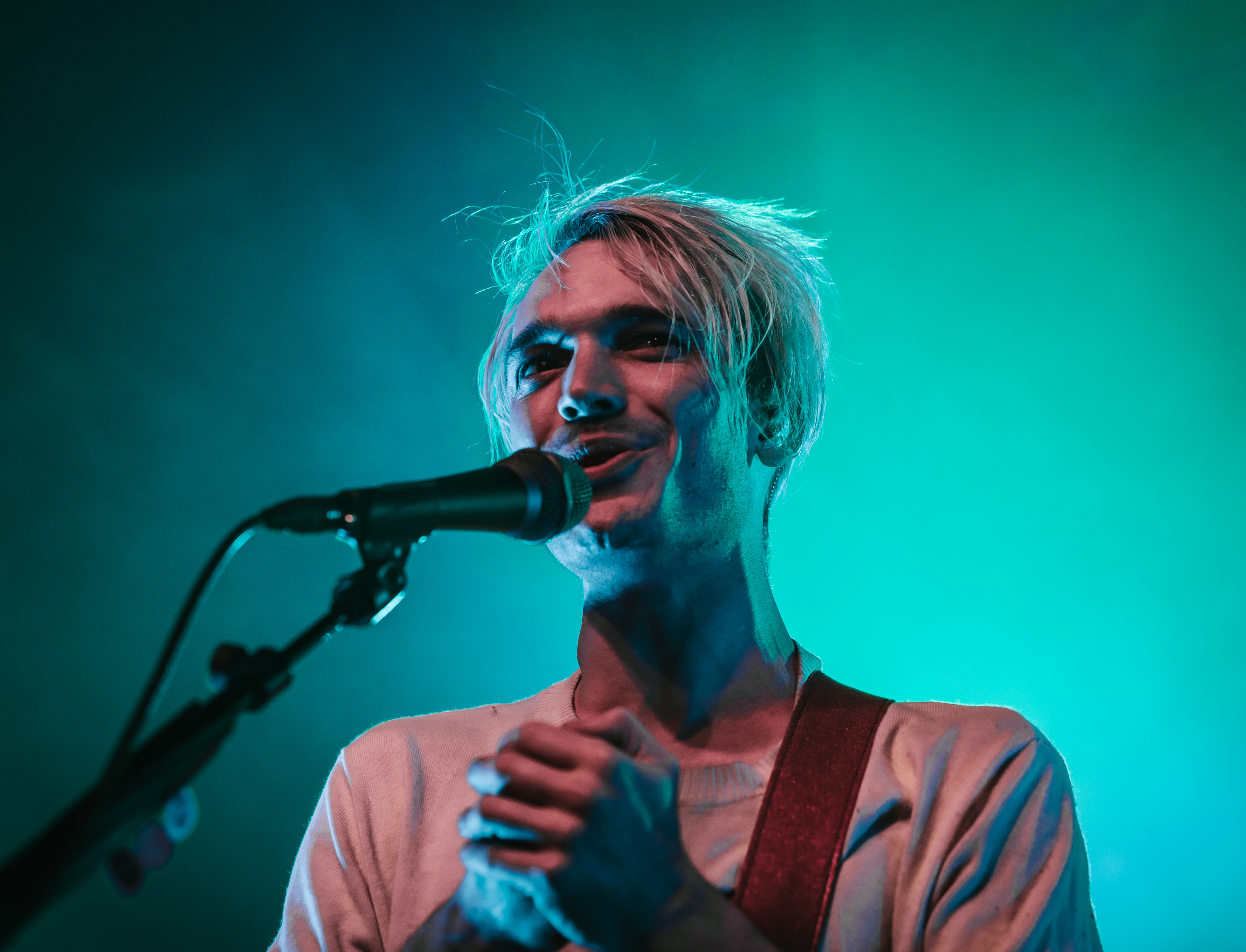
Josh Katz by Melanie Mae Williamson

=== Touring and debut studio album (2017–2020) ===
Badflower as well as American rock band Red Sun Rising would be opening acts for Pop Evil on their "Rock 'N' Roll Now" Tour from January to February 2017. After the tour, they would be the supporting bands with Bleeker and Beware of Darkness, as well as two additional shows with Red Sun Rising, playing at various music festivals like Buzzfest, Rock on Range and River City Rock Fest. They would also put on a summer tour with the rock group Goodbye June from Nashville, Tennessee, and In addition, it was announced they were to do several more headlines at major festivals like Louder Than Life Festival in Kentucky They have opened for Of Mice & Men, Greta Van Fleet, IDK, From Ashes to New, The Struts, Pop Evil, Bleeker, Beware of Darkness, The Wrecks, and Red Sun Rising.

During the tour, a previously unreleased track, "Move Me", was released on the band's Facebook page. Katz explained he wrote the song while heartbroken at his Thousand Oaks home in 2015. However, four days after the release of "Move Me", their tour van was broken into outside a venue in Los Angeles. Their backpacks, wallets, laptops, cameras, gear etc. were stolen and they were forced to cancel two shows in Santa Cruz and Berkeley. The tour reconvened soon after, and their track "White Noise", from their Temper EP, reached 1 million plays on Spotify.

On September 9, 2017 it was revealed on Facebook they were to start recording for their first full length album with their record label, being the first rock group to sign a deal with the label. Badflower began preproduction for the new album in Fall 2017 and began recording at Ocean Studios in Burbank alongside producer Noah Shain. More than a year later, on December 6, 2018, the band re-released their official music video for the song "Heroin", featuring the current version of the song, which had been added to the album.

At the end of 2017, Badflower had over 1,000,000 fans from 61 countries playing over 312,000 hours of their music from their Spotify alone.

On November 1, Badflower announced their debut album OK, I'm Sick, would be released on February 22, 2019.

Josh Katz said the following about the single 'Ghost': "I was depressed and thinking about self-harm. So I just wrote it. I played out the whole scenario and put it into a song because that's what writers do, I suppose. I didn't even know if it was gonna go on the album. I was sorta hesitant to even show it to the rest of my band, But everyone heard it and loved it".

The group released a single called "30" on July 17, 2020, coinciding with Katz's 30th birthday. It features lyrics centered around reaching the milestone age of 30 years old and being uncomfortable with it.

=== This Is How the World Ends (2021) ===
On July 6, 2021, the band announced their second studio album, titled This Is How the World Ends. The singles "Family", "Don't Hate Me", "Fukboi", and "Johnny Wants to Fight" were released sequentially ahead of the album's release on September 24. It was elected by Loudwire as the 38th best rock/metal album of 2021.

No Place Like Home (2024–2025)

On June 28, 2024, Badflower returned after a three-year hiatus with the release of the single "Teacher Has a Gun," accompanied by a music video the same day. The band followed this with the single "Detroit" on July 26, 2024, "Haunting You" in October 2024, and "London" on January 24, 2025. On April 4, 2025, Badflower announced their forthcoming third studio album, No Place Like Home, scheduled for release on June 20, 2025, and released the album’s fifth single, "Paws".

== Discography ==
=== Studio albums ===
Title	Details	Chart positions						
Title	Details	US	US Alt.	US Dig.	US Hard.	US Heat.	US Rock	US Sale.
OK, I'm Sick	Released: February 22, 2019; Label: Big Machine; Formats: CD, LP, digital download	140	10	16	6	1	22	20
This Is How the World Ends	Released: September 24, 2021; Label: Big Machine; Formats: CD, LP, digital download	—	—	—	20	9	—	30
No Place Like Home	Released: June 20, 2025; Label: Big Machine; Formats: CD, LP, digital download	—	—	—	—	—	—	—

=== EPs ===
- About a Girl (2013)
- Temper (2016)

=== Singles ===
Title	Year	Chart positions						Certifications	Album
Title	Year	US Rock Air.	US Alt.	US Hard Rock	US Main. Rock	US Rock	CAN Rock	Certifications	Album
"Soap"	2015	—	—	—	—	—	—		Non-album single
"Animal"	2016	—	—	—	28	—	—		Temper (EP)
"Ghost"	2018	11	22	—	2	11	26	RIAA: Gold; MC: Gold	OK, I'm Sick
"x ANA x"	2018	—	—	—	—	—	—		OK, I'm Sick
"Heroin"	2018	16	—	—	1	33	—		OK, I'm Sick
"Promise Me"	2019	—	32	—	—	—	—		OK, I'm Sick
"The Jester"	2019	16	—	—	1	26	—		OK, I'm Sick
"30"	2020	16	—	11	2	—	44		Non-album single
"F*ck the World"	2021	30	—	—	10	—	48		Non-album single
"Don't Hate Me"	2021	36	—	—	11	—	—		This Is How The World Ends
"Fukboi"	2021	—	—	—	—	—	—		This Is How The World Ends
"Johnny Wants to Fight"	2021	—	—	—	—	—	—		This Is How The World Ends
"Family"	2022	—	—	—	20	—	—		This Is How The World Ends
"Teacher Has a Gun"	2024	—	—	—	—	—	—		Non-album single
"Detroit"	2024	5	6	9	2	—	—		No Place Like Home
"Haunting You"	2024	—	—	—	—	—	—		No Place Like Home
"London"	2025	—	—	—	—	—	—		No Place Like Home
"Paws"	2025	33	25	—	18	—	—		No Place Like Home
"Snuff"	2025	—	—	—	—	—	—		No Place Like Home
"—" denotes a recording that did not chart or was not released in that territory.

=== Music videos ===
Title	Year	Director(s)
"The Jester"	2013	Madie Ramser
"Mother Mary"	2014	Jordan Wolfbauer and Sam Moore
"Soap"	2015	Madie Ramser and Jordan Wolfbauer
"Animal"	2017	Jordan Wolfbauer
"Move Me"	2017	
"Heroin"	2017	Jordan Wolfbauer
"Ghost"	2018	Jordan Wolfbauer
"x ANA x"	2018	Jordan Wolfbauer
"Promise Me"	2019	Jordan Wolfbauer
"The Jester" (version 2)	2019	Jordan Wolfbauer
"30"	2020	Jordan Wolfbauer
"Family"	2021	Josh Katz
"Don't Hate Me"	2021	Josh Katz
"Teacher Has a Gun"	2024	
"Detroit"	2024	
"London"	2025	
