= Ghost (Badflower song) =

Single by Badflower

from the album OK, I'm Sick
- Released: June 8, 2018
- Genre: Alternative rock; hard rock
- Length: 4:19
- Label: Big Machine
- Producer: Scott Borchetta

Badflower singles chronology
"Animal" (2016)	"Ghost" (2018)	"x ANA x" (2018)

Music video
- "Ghost" on YouTube

"Ghost" is a single by American rock band Badflower. It is the lead song off of their debut studio album, OK, I'm Sick. The single was released on June 8, 2018, through Big Machine Records.

== Background and recording ==
The song is about suicide and attempting suicide. When describing the song in an interview with Forbes, Josh Katz said "What I've learned is to prioritize my own personal life and stop taking the career so seriously. It's a job that I love and I get to connect with people and it's a really, really special thing I get to do".

Initially, the song was written not be a single, although according to Katz, Big Machine Records, encouraged the band to release the song as a single, to Katz's reluctance.

Katz's said in an interview with Loudwire that he wrote the song when he would have panic attacks on stage and after concerts. Katz said that "even though for me I was writing from a place of truth, When it was written I had just gotten off tour, and I spent the entire tour having panic attacks on stage every night. It was just something that came out of nowhere for reasons that only my therapist can tell you. When that happened, I got home and it was a traumatic experience having to deal with that every single night and I was in a really low place. I was depressed and thinking about self-harm. So I just wrote it. I played out the whole scenario and put it into a song because that's what writers do, I suppose. I didn't even know if it was gonna go on the album. I was sorta hesitant to even show it to the rest of my band, But everyone heard it and loved it, and said it might actually be a positive thing to put out in the world. So we did, and it turned out that I was wrong in my skepticism because it was a positive thing".

== Music video ==
The music video to "Ghost" was released on June 8, 2018.

== Charts ==
=== Weekly charts ===
Weekly chart performance for "Ghost"
Chart (2018)	Peak position
Canada Rock (Billboard)	26
US Hot Rock & Alternative Songs (Billboard)	11
US Rock & Alternative Airplay (Billboard)	11

=== Year-end charts ===
Year-end chart performance for "Ghost"
Chart (2018)	Position
US Hot Rock Songs (Billboard)	42
US Rock Airplay (Billboard)	40

== Certifications ==
Certifications for "Ghost"
Region	Certification	Certified units/sales
Canada (Music Canada)	Gold	40,000^{‡}
United States (RIAA)	Platinum	1,000,000^{‡}
^{‡} Sales+streaming figures based on certification alone.
