= Sean Bankhead =

American dancer

- Born: Sean Bankhead; Philadelphia, Pennsylvania, U.S.
- Genres: Dance
- Occupations: Choreographer; producer
- Years active: 2006–present
- Website: https://seanbankhead.com/

Sean Bankhead is an American dancer and choreographer. He served as a judge on the American music competition series Becoming A Popstar.

Bankhead has created the choreography for many music videos, including Lil Nas X's "Industry Baby"(featuring Jack Harlow), Normani's "Motivation" and "Wild Side"(featuring Cardi B), Cardi B's "Up", Sam Smith's "Dancing with a Stranger" (with Normani) and "I'm Ready" (with Demi Lovato), and FKA Twigs' "Tears in the Club" (featuring The Weeknd), Tate McRae's "Exes", Flo's "In My Bag" and Victoria Monet's "On My Mama". In 2024, he joined Usher during his Super Bowl LVIII halftime show.

He has also choreographed concert tours, and television and film productions. Throughout his career, he has earned eight nominations for the MTV Video Music Award for Best Choreography.

== Early life ==
Bankhead was born in Philadelphia, Pennsylvania. He moved to Atlanta, Georgia and began his career by uploading a dance video to YouTube in 2006 on his channel "Seanalator". The video went viral and amassed approximately 1.5 million views. In 2007, Bankhead landed his first high-profile gig, appearing as a love interest in the music video for "Promise Ring" by Tiffany Evans. The following year, he was hired as a dancer for Beyoncé, performing with the singer during a live performance of "Single Ladies (Put a Ring on It)" on The Tyra Banks Show.

== Career ==
=== Music videos and live performances ===
In 2014, Bankhead choreographed the music video for Fifth Harmony's "Boss", and later on their music video for "Down", which earned him a MTV Video Music Award nomination; since then he has developed a close working relationship with former Fifth Harmony member Normani, referring to her as his muse, and choreographing her music videos for "Motivation", "Dancing with a Stranger"(with Sam Smith), and "Wild Side"(featuring Cardi B). He has also frequently collaborated with Missy Elliott, working with her on the music video for her single "I'm Better", and her Michael Jackson Video Vanguard Award medley at the 2019 MTV Video Music Awards.

Bankhead has also choreographed, directed, and performed many music videos and performances, such as Cardi B's "Up" and her live performance of "WAP" (with Megan Thee Stallion) at the 63rd Annual Grammy Awards, Megan Thee Stallion's "Her", Sam Smith & Demi Lovato's "I'm Ready", Saweetie's "Best Friend" (featuring Doja Cat), Lil Nas X's "Industry Baby"(featuring Jack Harlow), and their live performance of "Montero (Call Me by Your Name)" on SNL, City Girls' "Twerkulator", Alesso's "When I'm Gone", (with Katy Perry), and "Tears in the Club" by FKA Twigs (featuring The Weeknd). He has also worked for Britney Spears Saucy Santana (with Latto), and Drake.

=== Additional choreographed work ===
Bankhead has choreographed for various television shows, including the Lee Daniels drama series Empire, and the Lena Waithe BET series Boomerang. He choreographed all of the dance performances for the Fox musical drama Star. Bankhead was credited for choreographing a dance routine for Will Ferrell in the movie Anchorman 2: The Legend Continues. In 2013, he served as the assistant choreographer for Beyoncé's The Mrs. Carter Show World Tour.

In 2020, Bankhead choreographed the Pepsi Zero Sugar Super Bowl LIV commercial featuring Missy Elliott and H.E.R. The following year, he worked with Pepsi again, choreographing a commercial featuring Doja Cat. In 2022, Bankhead joined Joe Jonas and Becky G to serve as a judges on the MTV & TikTok American music competition series Becoming A Popstar.

== Personal life ==
Bankhead is openly gay.

He stated in interview with Yahoo! Life that he is close friends with fellow choreographer JaQuel Knight.

== Awards ==
In 2021, Bankhead was placed on the 'Performers of the Year' section of the Out100 list by Out magazine, which is an annual list described as a "prestigious compilation of the year's most impactful and influential LGBTQ+ people".

Award	Year (Note: Indicates the year of ceremony. Each year is linked to the article about the awards held that year, wherever possible.)	Recipient(s) and nominee(s)	Category	Result	Ref.
Cannes Lions International Festival of Creativity	2022	"Industry Baby" (performed by Lil Nas X and Jack Harlow)	Excellence in Music Video	Silver	
Dance Magazine Awards	2019	"Motivation" (performed by Normani)	Best Music Video	Nominated	
Hollywood Music Video Awards	2025	Himself	Choreographer of the Year	Won	
Hollywood Music Video Awards	2025	"It's OK I'm OK" (performed by Tate McRae)	Best Choreography	Won	
iHeartRadio Music Awards	2020	"Motivation" (performed by Normani)	Favorite Music Video Choreography	Nominated	
MTV Video Music Awards	2017	"Down" (performed by Fifth Harmony)	Best Choreography	Nominated	
MTV Video Music Awards	2020	"Motivation" (performed by Normani)	Best Choreography	Nominated	
MTV Video Music Awards	2022	"Wild Side" (performed by Normani and Cardi B)	Best Choreography	Nominated	
MTV Video Music Awards	2022	"Industry Baby" (performed by Lil Nas X and Jack Harlow)	Best Choreography	Nominated	
MTV Video Music Awards	2022	"Tears in the Club" (performed by FKA Twigs and The Weeknd)	Best Choreography	Nominated	
MTV Video Music Awards	2023	"Her" (performed by Megan Thee Stallion)	Best Choreography	Nominated	
MTV Video Music Awards	2024	"Greedy" (performed by Tate McRae)	Best Choreography	Nominated	
MTV Video Music Awards	2024	"Rockstar" (performed by Lisa)	Best Choreography	Nominated	
UK Music Video Awards	2021	"Industry Baby" (performed by Lil Nas X and Jack Harlow)	Best Choreography in a Video	Nominated	
