= Motivation (Normani song) =

2019 single by Normani

Single by Normani
- Released: August 16, 2019
- Recorded: 2019
- Genre: Pop; R&B
- Length: 3:13
- Label: Keep Cool; RCA
- Composers: Ariana Grande; Savan Kotecha; Max Martin; Ilya Salmanzadeh
- Lyricist: Normani Kordei Hamilton
- Producer: Ilya

Normani singles chronology
"Dancing with a Stranger" (2019)	"Motivation" (2019)	"Diamonds" (2020)

21 Savage singles chronology
"Floating" (2019)	"Motivation" (Savage Remix) (2019)	"Immortal" (2019)

Music video
- "Motivation" on YouTube

"Motivation" is the debut solo single by American singer Normani. It was released on August 16, 2019, by Keep Cool and RCA. It was written by Normani alongside Ariana Grande, Max Martin, Savan Kotecha, and producer Ilya. It marked the first time Normani released a solo song unaccompanied by another artist.

"Motivation" peaked within the Top 40 in ten countries, including the US and UK, and reached the top ten of the Dance Club Songs chart. It was certified Platinum by the Recording Industry Association of America (RIAA), and earned a Diamond certification in Brazil. The song received critical acclaim, landing on various publications' year-end list, was listed by iHeartRadio as one of the songs that defined the 2010s, and ranked as the 79th greatest song of the 2010s by Crack Magazine. "Motivation" was also rated as one of the best "workout songs" by Self, Men's Health, and Time magazine.

The track's accompanying music video was also released on August 16, 2019. It was directed by Dave Meyers and Daniel Russell, and featured choreography by Sean Bankhead, as well as a cameo by model Lori Harvey. Music critics praised the choreography and the nostalgic themes of the video. It was named the best music video of 2019 by Vibe, the second best music video of 2019 by Pitchfork, and was also nominated for the MTV Video Music Award for Best Choreography. The official remix of "Motivation" featuring rapper 21 Savage, subtitled "Savage Remix", was released on October 28, 2019.

== Background and release ==
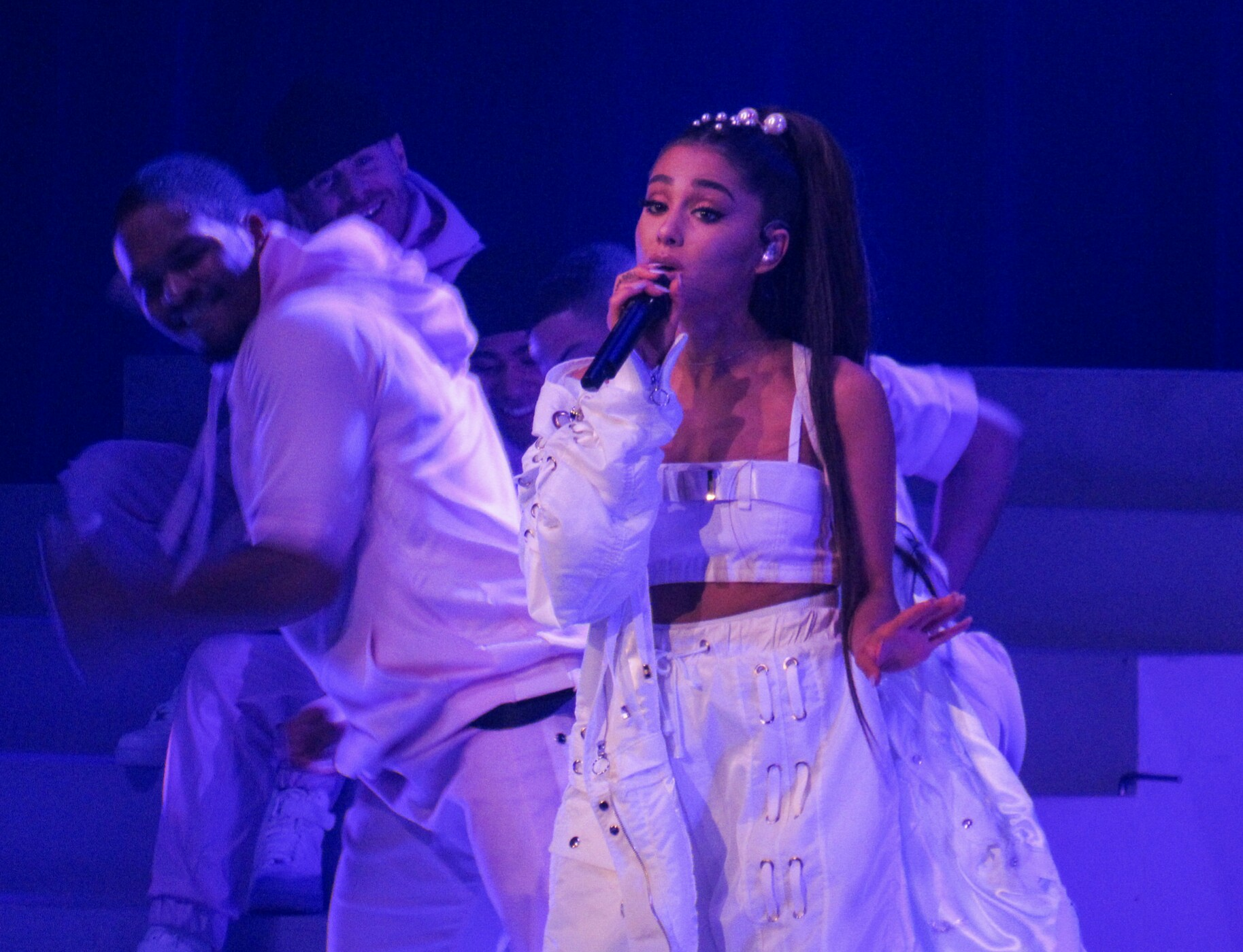
Ariana Grande (pictured in February 2017) co-wrote "Motivation".

"Motivation" was initially teased with a snippet by Normani on her Twitter on August 2, 2019. She further spoke on the song, as well as Ariana Grande's involvement in co-writing, during Rolling Stone's Morning Sessions at Lollapalooza, explaining "[Grande]'s dope. She also has a part in the record that I'm releasing, too. She wrote on it." The song was officially announced on August 9 and released on August 16, 2019.

== Music video ==
=== Background ===
A music video was released alongside the song on August 16, and was directed by Dave Meyers and Daniel Russell and choreographed by Sean Bankhead. Model Lori Harvey also makes a cameo in the video. It features homages to music videos from the late 1990s and early 2000s, such as "Goodies" by Ciara, "Crazy in Love" by Beyoncé, "...Baby One More Time" by Britney Spears and "I'm Real (Murder Remix)" by Jennifer Lopez and Ja Rule. The location of the video is in the same Los Angeles, Boyle Heights, neighborhood and park (Pecan Park) of Lopez and Ja Rule's "I'm Real" video.

=== Synopsis ===
The video begins with a younger version of Normani watching the BET music video countdown show 106 & Park and daydreaming that former hosts Terrence J and Rocsi Diaz announced that she has the "number 1 video in the world", while her grandmother in the background tells her to lower the noise but then gives her blessing. As "Motivation" starts to play, it transitions from the living room to the screen where she is seen walking in the middle of a road, inspired by Beyoncé's "Crazy in Love". The second sequence is a dance sequence, with Normani dancing with her dancers in a Los Angeles neighborhood. The scene shifts to a fence background where Normani is seen climbing the fence while dancing before moving to a basketball court where she performs a gymnastics tumbling pass and a basketball technique. The rain sequence is then shown where Normani is accompanied by a band. The video ends as Normani performs a final dance routine in the late afternoon.

=== Recognition ===
Upon the release the music video for "Motivation" went viral due to the video's intense choreography, more specifically a basketball move that started a viral dance challenge. The music video received acclaim from music critics and was widespread across social media from many celebrities in support of the song, including Ariana Grande, Kehlani, Lizzo, Halsey, Cardi B, and Kelly Clarkson. Siobhan Burke of The New York Times wrote "Twerking on a chain-link fence; doing a split on concrete in the rain; bouncing a basketball off multiple body parts, between effortless pirouettes: When Normani released the music video for her irresistible single 'Motivation' in August, the message was clear. Not only could she sing — she could also really, really dance." Tom Breihan for Stereogum wrote "I would now like to call the world's attention to the moment where Normani bounces a basketball off of her ass. This occurs right around the 1:54 mark of the new "Motivation" video, and it is honestly an astonishing physical feat, some strip-club Jackie Chan shit. The rest of the video is good. That one brief dance move is instantly iconic, like the Michael Jackson 'Smooth Criminal' lean." Dee Lockett of Vulture wrote "For her debut solo single, Normani did what she came to do. A (destiny's) child of the 2000s raised on a steady diet of 106 & Park, 'Crazy in Love,' 'Goodies,' Omarion, and J.Lo circa the 'I'm Real' remix, Normani bottled all those influences, injected them into her veins, and said, 'Yes, A star is born.'"

E! News dubbed the music video as one of the pop culture moments that defined 2019. Vibe named "Motivation" as the best music video of 2019. Pitchfork named it the second best of 2019; while Idolator also placed it second on their list. It was voted Best Music Video in the 2019 Popjustice Readers' Poll. In addition "Motivation" was listed on the Best Music Videos of 2019 list by Rolling Stone, Insider Inc., Wonderland, and Shondaland. Slant Magazine also included it among its 20 best music videos of 2019, with Sophia Ordaz stating that "Motivation" captures the potential Normani has to become the next unstoppable female entertainer, emulating the showmanship of such pop icons as Janet Jackson, Britney Spears, and Beyoncé. PopSugar listed "Motivation" as one of the Sexiest Videos of the 2010s, and as one of the Best Dance Videos of the 2010s.

Several publications including Billboard, Paper, The New York Times and Genius noted "Motivation" for being among the music videos following a larger cultural trend of early-'00s nostalgia. Cosmopolitan named it as one of the best choreography-centric videos of 2019.

== Critical reception ==
"Motivation" received critical acclaim upon release. Forbes wrote that "Motivation" "sounds like the perfectly-crafted pop song [...] catchy, summery and fun", adding that it is reminiscent of co-writer Ariana Grande's sound, and while familiar, it "provides something currently missing from the pop landscape." i-D said the song is a "smash" with a catchy chorus, and it recalls the "Rich Harrison-produced pop of the early 2000s" and Beyoncé's Coachella performance. Pitchfork named it "Best New Track", writing that Normani's "sultry, syncopated vocal lines bear the imprint of co-writer Ariana Grande", and she "seems to draw on both 'Check on It'-era Beyoncé and the brassy sounds of Homecoming." The Guardian described the song as a "buoyant, horn-laced, late-summer BBQ bop that nestles in the nook between Ariana Grande and 2006-era Beyoncé." Los Angeles Times considered the track a "sticky bop perfectly primed to get us through the rest of the summer". Rolling Stone metaphorically likened the song to physically being able to "hear a pop superstar be[ing] born."

=== Recognition ===
Time ranked "Motivation" 2nd on their list of the 50 Best Workout Songs. Self and Men's Health also named it one of the best workout songs.

The song was placed 79th on the top 100 songs of the 2010s by Crack Magazine, which described it as a "superlatively bright, bouncy bop that is steeped in a knowledge of pop and R&B history, but which also feels like the start of something wonderful." The New York Times listed it on their 2020 list of 25 Songs That Matter Now. Vice also included the song in its list of the 28 Best R&B Songs of Summer 2019. Cosmopolitan dubbed "Motivation" as the best "banger" of 2019. PopBuzz named it the best song of 2019. British GQ ranked it as the second best song of 2019. Uproxx and The Guardian also included the song in their Best Songs of 2019 list, at 13th and 17th respectively. Instinct magazine called it the tenth Top Female Bop of 2019. The Associated Press named "Motivation" as the 10th best song of 2019. Pitchfork placed it at number 14 among their 100 Best Songs of 2019 list, saying that Normani "breezed through the track, with the confidence of an artist who knows her worth, and further stamped her star power with the stunningly gymnastic choreography in its video. Both song and video contain the brassy essence of pop R&B's early-2000s glory days, an innocent coquettishness and pure joy in hitting the dance floor—and in paying homage to that era, Normani hit a hard reset on her career trajectory, proving that she was always more formidable than she'd gotten credit for." Billboard ranked "Motivation" as the 27th Best Song of 2019. Esquire placed it among their 40 Best Songs of 2019 list. NME ranked it as the 29th best song of 2019. The Fader listed the song as one of the best of 2019. "Motivation" was also included in the Best Songs of 2019 list for Entertainment Weekly, Vice, Elle, Vogue. iHeartRadio mentioned the song among 140 songs that defined the 2010s. Yardbarker noted it as one of the best hit songs of the 2010s, while naming it as the runner up for best song of 2019.

== Live performances ==
Normani first performed "Motivation" at the 2019 MTV Video Music Awards on August 26, 2019. The performance was positively-received. Harper's Bazaar named it the best performance of 2019. Glamour praised Normani, dubbing her the "Queen of Pop" after stating that she delivered a "knockout performance" of the song. PopSugar named the performance as one of the 69 Unforgettable VMA moments ever.

"Only the most iconic MTV Video Music Awards performances go down as important historical events, and guess what? Normani just joined the ranks of Britney Spears and that snake, Lady Gaga covered in blood, and Beyoncé's pregnancy announcement with her unreal performance of "Motivation."

— Cosmopolitan discussing Normani's MTV Video Music Award performance

The song was additionally performed at Jingle Ball in 2019. Normani closed out the 9th Annual Streamy Awards with a rendition of "Motivation".

== Accolades ==
Year	Award	Category	Result
2019	Soul Train Music Awards	Best Dance Performance	Nominated
2019	W Magazine Award	Song of The Summer That Was Released Too Late	Won
2019	Dance Magazine Awards	Best Music Video	Nominated
2020	iHeartRadio Music Awards	Favorite Music Video choreography	Nominated
2020	NAACP Image Awards	Outstanding Song – Contemporary	Nominated
2020	NME Awards	Best Music Video	Nominated
2020	MTV Video Music Award	Best Choreography	Nominated

== Cover versions and usage in media ==
The synth-pop group Muna released an official cover of "Motivation" in 2019. Brie Larson also shared a rendition of the song to her Instagram. The X Factor: Celebrity formed girl group V5 covered the song on the first season of the show. Furthermore, singer NIA recreated Normani's 2019 MTV Video Music Award performance of the song on the American Spanish-language television show Tu cara me suena.

"Motivation" was included on an episode of the sixth series of Love Island. The song also appeared in the Pandora Radio TV commercial, "Be You: Afternoon" (2019). Jeff Goldblum went viral after he put on an impromptu dance performance to the song at an LGBTQ New Orleans Pride Parade while taping an episode of his National Geographic show The World According to Jeff Goldblum for Disney+. Stephen "tWitch" Boss and his then pregnant wife Allison Holker conducted a dance routine to "Motivation" as part of his guest hosting gig for The Ellen DeGeneres Show.

The song was played during an episode of the first season of the Lena Waithe comedy series Twenties on BET. It was also used during the swimsuit competition segment of Miss Universe 2019. In 2020, it was featured in the Netflix movie Work It. Lil Nas X recreated a scene from the "Motivation" music video that he posted on social media. Furthermore, a photograph of Sasha Obama wearing an outfit that heavily resembles the outfit Normani wore in the music video for the single went viral and sparked a social media debate.

== Credits and personnel ==
Credits adapted from Tidal.

- Normani – vocals, songwriter
- Ariana Grande – songwriter
- Max Martin – songwriter
- Savan Kotecha – songwriter, backing vocals
- Ilya Salmanzadeh – producer, songwriter, programmer, vocal producer, backing vocals, bass, drums, keyboards
- Kuk Harrell – vocal producer
- Peter Carlsson – vocal producer
- Simone Torres – vocal producer
- Daniel Oestreicher – baritone saxophone
- Troy "Trombone Shorty" Andrews – trumpet, trombone
- Cory Bice – engineer
- Jeremy Lertola – engineer
- John Hanes – engineer
- Sam Holland – engineer
- Serban Ghenea – mixing engineer
- Dave Kutch – mastering engineer

== Charts ==
Chart performance for "Motivation"
Chart (2019)	Peak position
Australia (ARIA)	28
Belgium (Ultratop 50 Flanders)	40
Canada Hot 100 (Billboard)	24
Canada CHR/Top 40 (Billboard)	11
Canada Hot AC (Billboard)	29
Colombia (National-Report)	73
Croatia (HRT)	84
France (SNEP)	59
Greece (IFPI)	22
Ireland (IRMA)	20
Lithuania (AGATA)	27
Netherlands (Dutch Top 40)	24
Netherlands (Single Top 100)	55
New Zealand (Recorded Music NZ)	22
Portugal (AFP)	68
Romania (Airplay 100)	52
Scottish Singles Sales (Official Charts)	20
Slovakia Singles Digital (ČNS IFPI)	63
Sweden Heatseeker (Sverigetopplistan)	12
UK Singles (Official Charts)	27
US Billboard Hot 100	33
US Dance Airplay (Billboard)	22
US Dance Club Songs (Billboard)	9
US Pop Airplay (Billboard)	15
US Rhythmic Airplay (Billboard)	30
US Rolling Stone Top 100	26

== Certifications ==
Region	Certification	Certified units/sales
Australia (ARIA)	Platinum	70,000^{‡}
Brazil (Pro-Música Brasil)	Diamond	160,000^{‡}
Canada (Music Canada)	Gold	40,000^{‡}
New Zealand (RMNZ)	2× Platinum	60,000^{‡}
United Kingdom (BPI)	Gold	400,000^{‡}
United States (RIAA)	Platinum	1,000,000^{‡}
^{‡} Sales+streaming figures based on certification alone.

== Release history ==
Region	Date	Format	Label	Ref.
Various	August 16, 2019	Digital download; streaming	Keep Cool; RCA	
Australia	August 16, 2019	Contemporary hit radio	RCA; Sony	
United States	August 20, 2019	Contemporary hit radio	Keep Cool; RCA	
Canada	August 21, 2019	Contemporary hit radio	Sony	
