= Dancin' to the Hits =

- Presented by: Lorenzo Lamas
- Country of origin: United States
- Original language: English

Production
- Running time: 30 minutes
- Production companies: Together Again Productions (1986–1987); Together Again Television Productions (1987); Gaylord Production Company

Original release
- Network: CBS
- Release: 1986 – 1987

Dancin' to the Hits is a nationally syndicated TV show in the United States hosted by Lorenzo Lamas during the 1986–1987 season. Professional dancers performed to a medley of Top 40 hits, and live acts performed. Some of the acts that performed were Howard Hewett, The S.O.S. Band, Samantha Fox, and Stacy Lattisaw. Dancin’ to the Hits is the Solid Gold knockoff.

== The Sweet Dreams as Dancers ==
- Aurorah Allain
- Jeff Amsden
- Priscilla Harris
- William Holden, Jr.
- Barry Lather
- Eartha Robinson
- Andrea Paige Wilson (who appeared as a dancer on seasons 1–3 of Kids Incorporated (1984–1987) and cameo appeared in Kidsongs episodes "The Wonderful World of Sports" (that got renamed "Let's Play Ball" in 1990)-"A Day at the Circus" (1987))
- Cheryl Yamaguchi
