= List of songs recorded by Fifth Harmony =

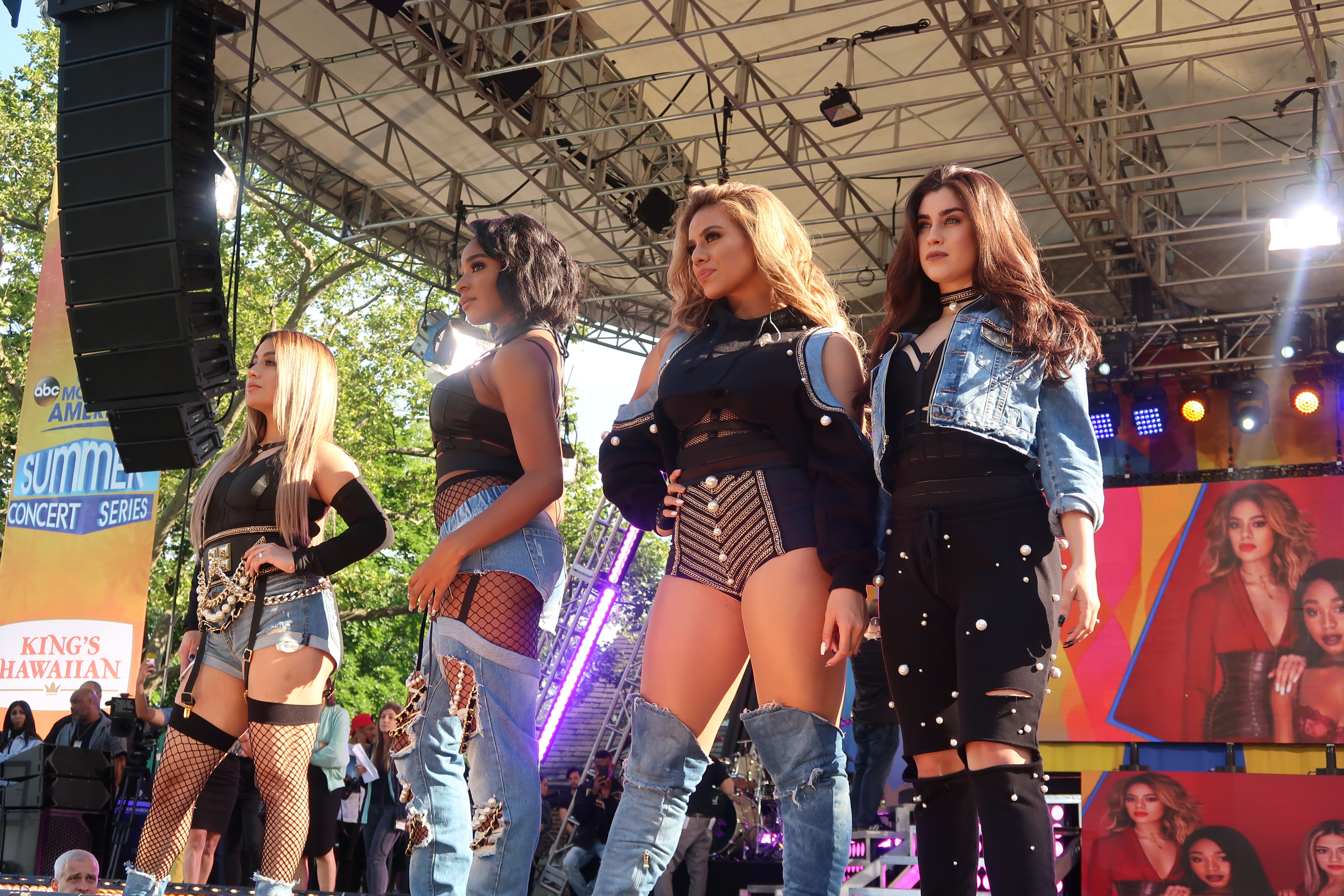
Fifth Harmony has recorded songs for three studio albums, entitled Reflection (2015), 7/27 (2016) and Fifth Harmony (2017).

Fifth Harmony is an American four-piece girl group, consisting of members Ally Brooke, Normani Kordei, Dinah Jane, Lauren Jauregui and formerly Camila Cabello. The group began working on their debut EP, Better Together. It was released in 2013, following their exit from the second season of the American televised singing competition, The X Factor. At this time, the group contributed guest vocals on two covers, "When I Was Your Man" by Bruno Mars and "Mirrors" by Justin Timberlake, for Boyce Avenue's cover EP, Cover Collaborations, Volume 2. The first single released from their debut EP, Better Together, was "Miss Movin' On", a power pop song with a synth-backed chorus written by singer-songwriter Julia Michaels among others. While the group had very limited songwriting credits in their EP, they are credited as writers on the promotional single, "Me & My Girls" with collaborations from Patrick James Bianco, Beau Alexandrè Dozier, and John Ryan. Their EP was subsequently released four times with an acoustic version, a remixes EP, and two Spanish versions, one standard and one acoustic.

The group's debut studio album, Reflection, saw collaborations with different sets of producers and songwriters as well as artists who previously worked on their EP. A returning composer includes Julian Bunetta who co-wrote the titular track. Different writers and producers were heavily involved in making this album including Taylor Parks, and Chris Aparri and Victoria Monét, who was the most involved co-writing and co-producing a total of four tracks. "Worth It", the third and final single released from Reflection, incorporates strong elements of Balkan music in its production, a trademark of Ori Kaplan, who is credited as a co-producer. The previous single, "Sledgehammer", the synthpop and electronic dance song with new wave and 1980's music style influences was penned by Meghan Trainor with additional writing from Jonas Seberg and Sean Douglas. The lyrical content cast a more mature, reflective, darker and somber tone over Better Together, which critics noted as a step away from the group's "teen" image in their previous EP. Fifth Harmony's second studio album, 7/27 saw the group experiment with new genres such as tropical house, reggae and funk. New songwriters and producers for this record include Joshua Coleman, musician Kygo and Dallas Koehlke. Coleman co-wrote album's lead single, "Work from Home", the R&B track with trap and tropical house influences with help from the song's featured artist, Ty Dolla Sign. The group is credited as songwriters in only one song, "All in My Head (Flex)" with additional writing from Eriksen and Hermansen from Stargate and production from Monét, among other credits.

The group's third album, Fifth Harmony, was released on August 25, 2017 following the departure of group member Camila Cabello. It was preceded by the lead single, "Down", which was released June 2 and features guest vocals from rapper Gucci Mane. A promotional single from the album "Angel", was released on August 10 and the second single, "He Like That" was released on August 25. The remaining members (Brooke, Jauregui, Kordei and Hansen) co-wrote at least half of the songs from the album, and in general had more freedom in choosing which songs to record and produce, as well as suggesting song ideas. The album's main genres are pop, R&B, hip-hop and tropical house.

== Released songs ==
Key
•	Indicates song containing non-English lyrics

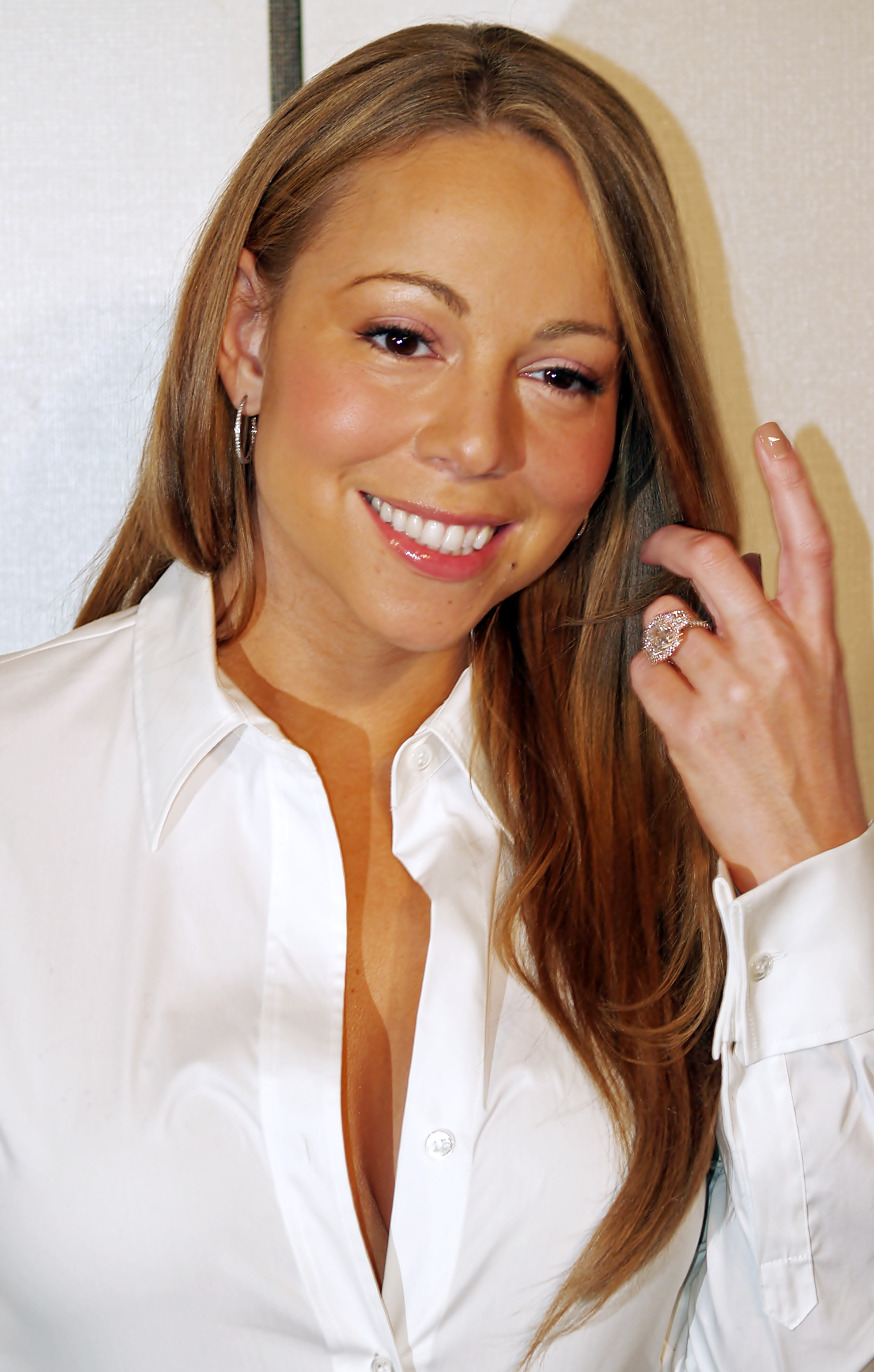
Mariah Carey is credited as a co-writer on the group's recorded cover of the 1994 song "All I Want for Christmas Is You" and "Like Mariah", which contains elements of the composition "Always Be My Baby".

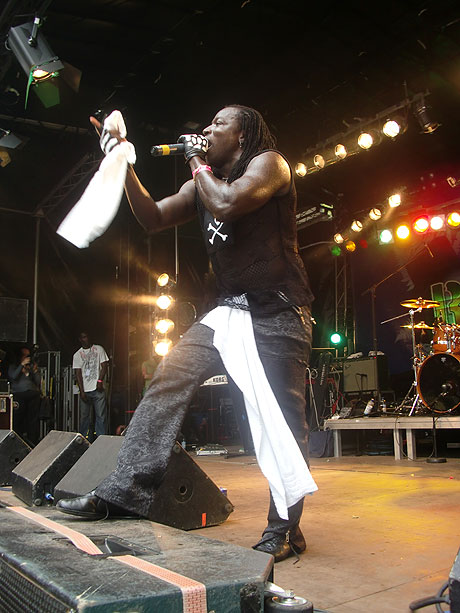
"'All In My Head (Flex)" contains an interpolation of Mad Cobra's song "Flex". Due to the interpolation, Cobra received co-writing credits.

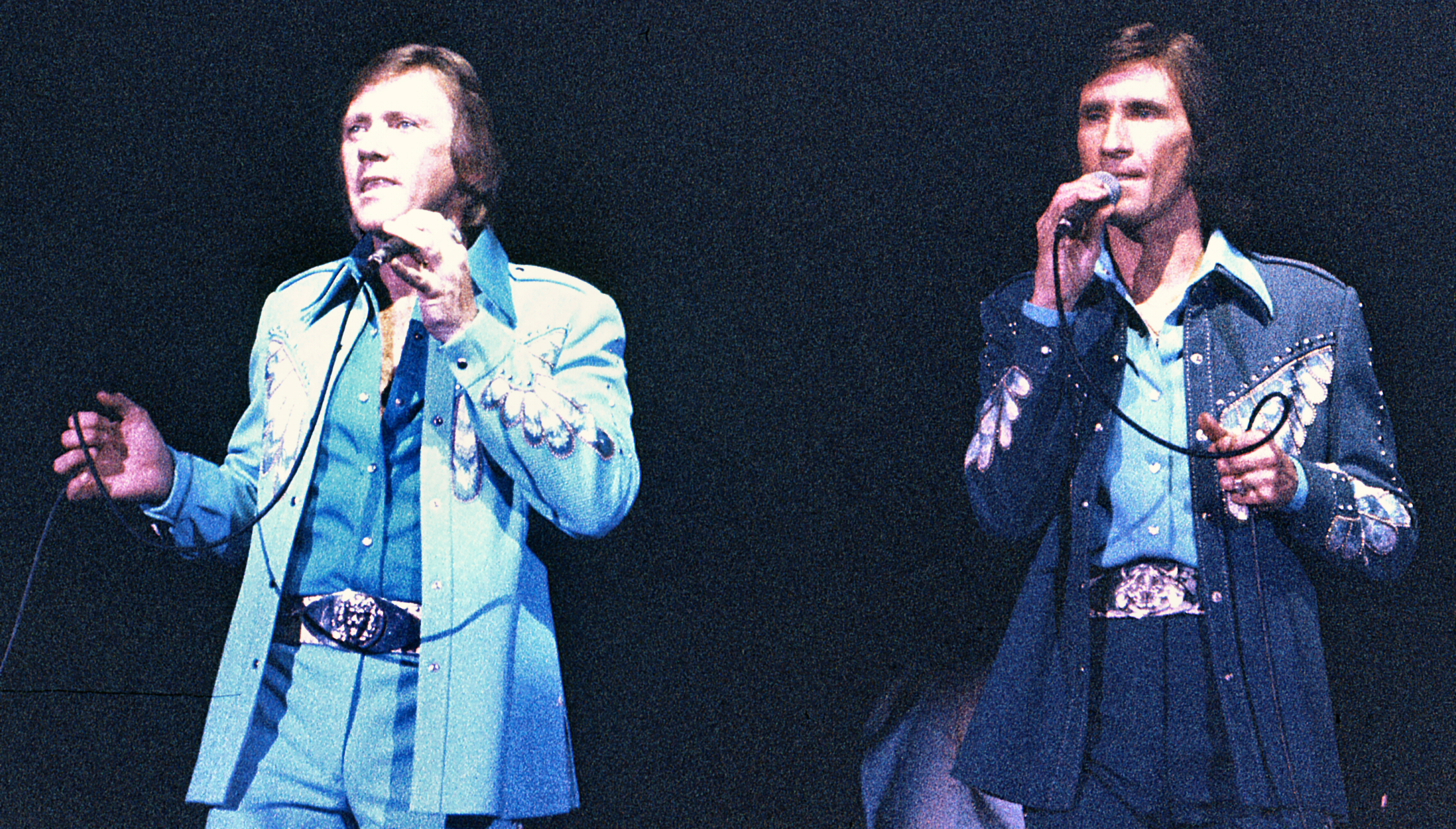
"Body Rock" interpolates from Bill Medley (pictured right) and Jennifer Warnes' 1987 hit "(I've Had) The Time of My Life".

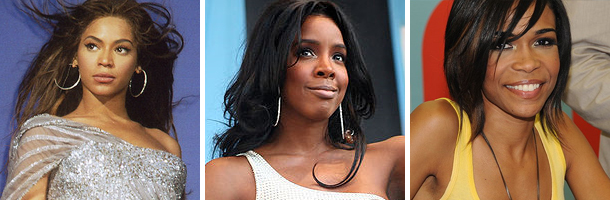
"Brave Honest Beautiful" contains a portion of the composition "Bootylicious", written by Beyoncé Knowles (pictured left) and Kelendria Rowland (pictured center), from Destiny's Child.

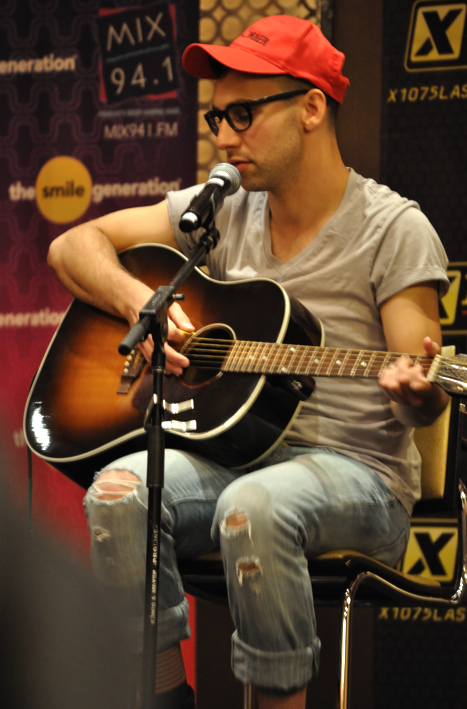
"Dope" was co-written by Jack Antonoff of the band Fun and Bleachers.

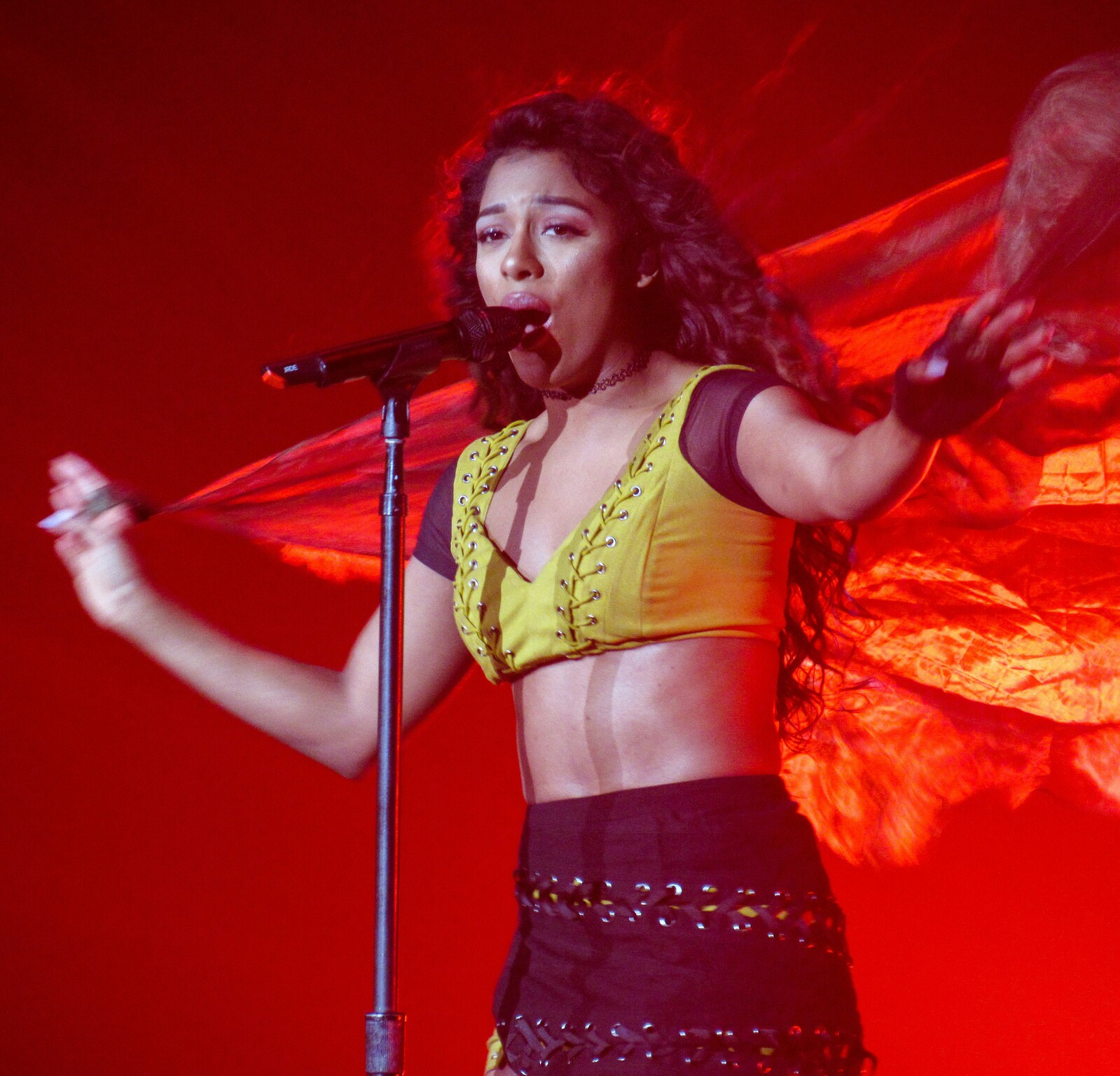
Victoria Monét co-wrote five tracks, including "Everlasting Love", "No Way", "Reflection", "Them Girls Be Like" and "We Know".

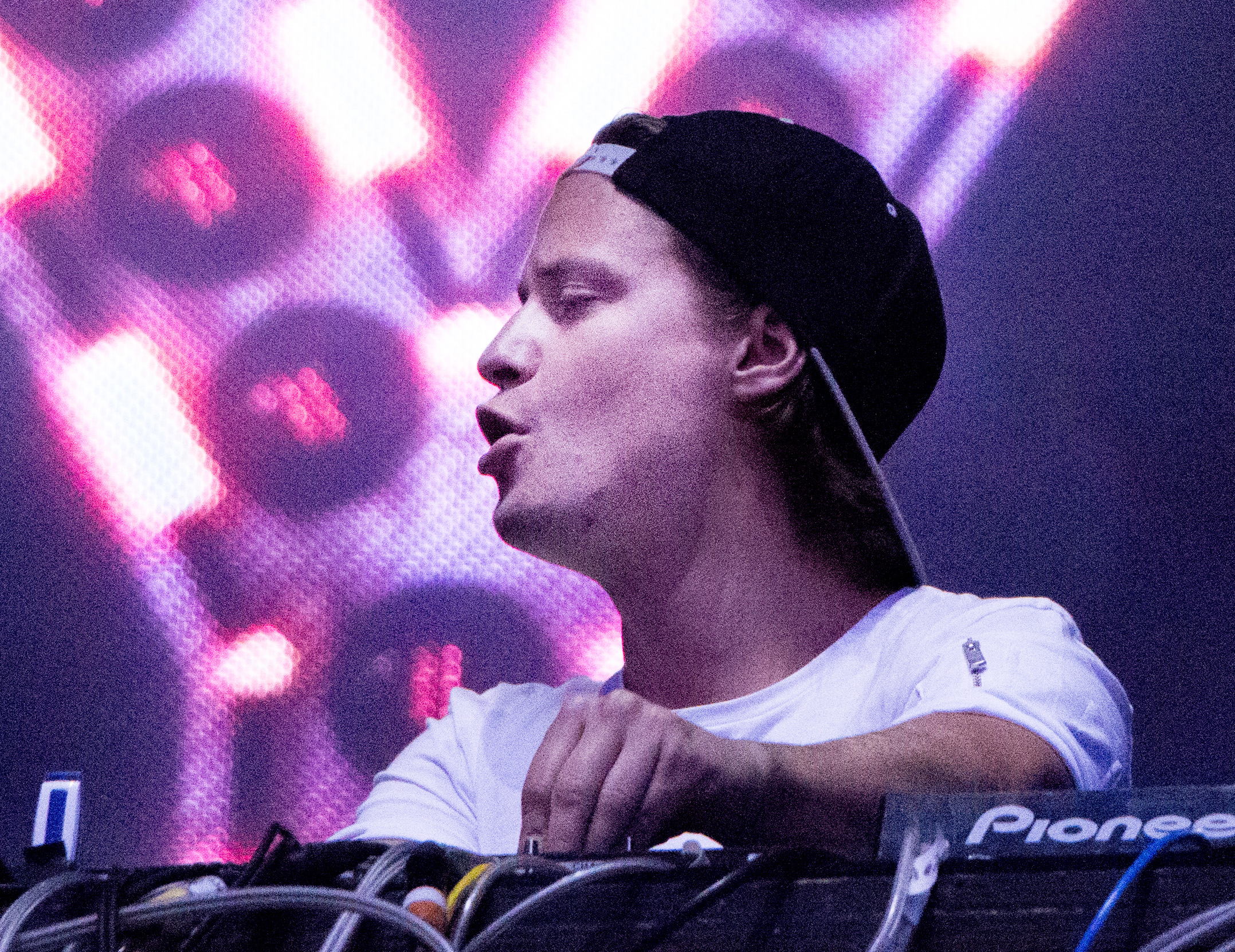
Norwegian DJ Kygo wrote the tracks "Write On Me" and "Squeeze".

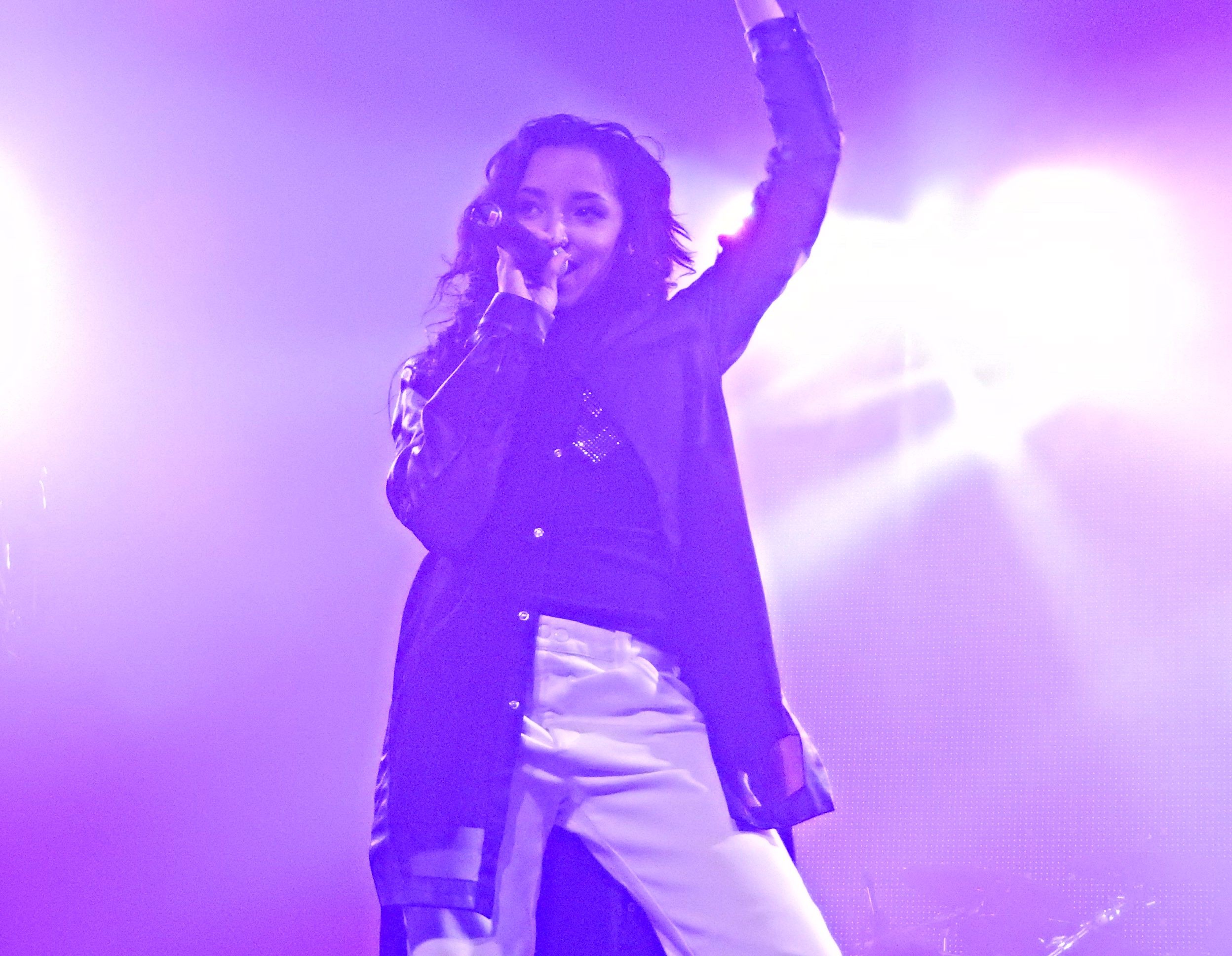
American R&B singer Tinashe co-wrote three tracks from 7/27 titled "That's My Girl", "Scared of Happy" and "The Life".

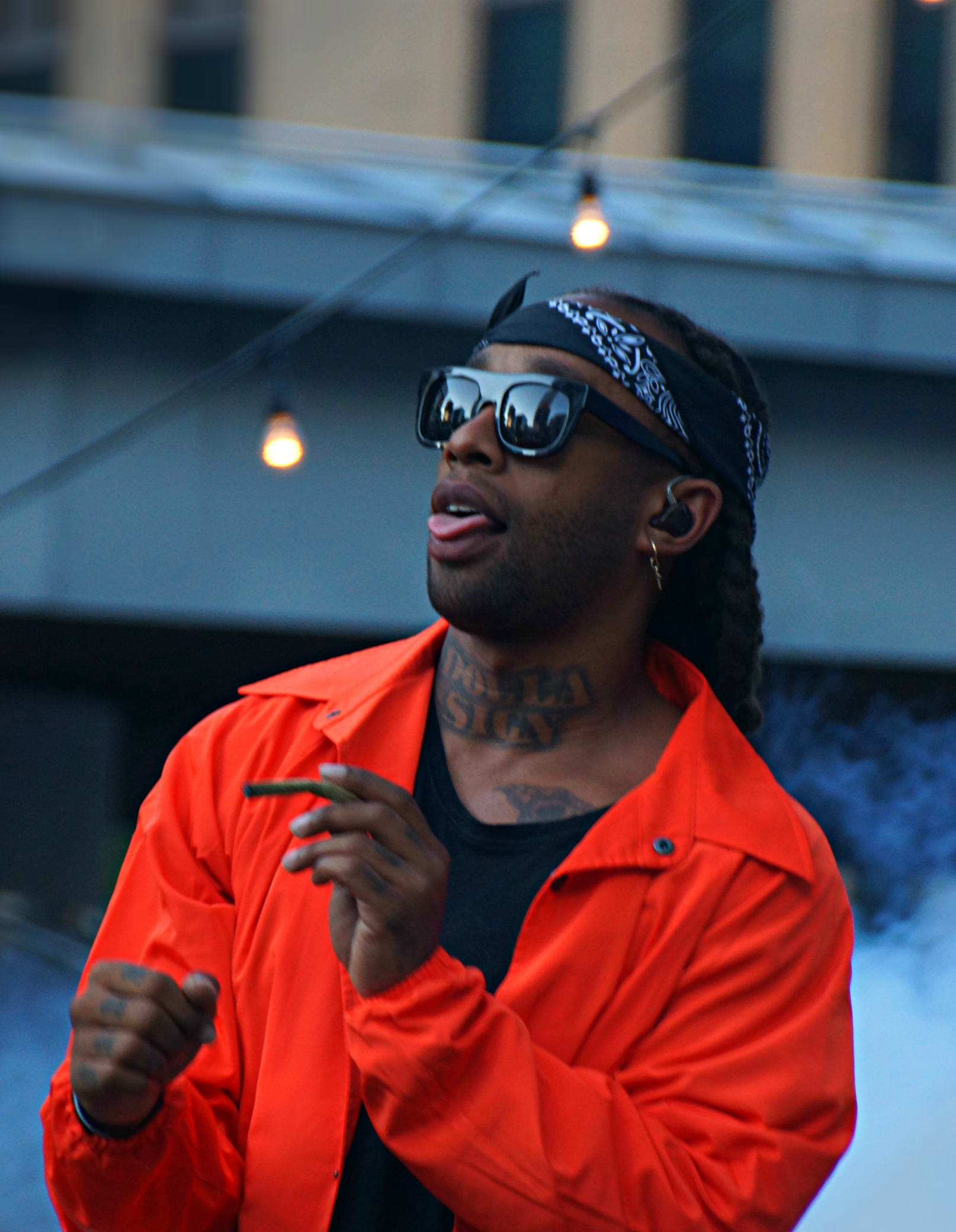
Rapper Ty Dolla Sign is featured and credited as a co-writer on the track, "Work from Home".

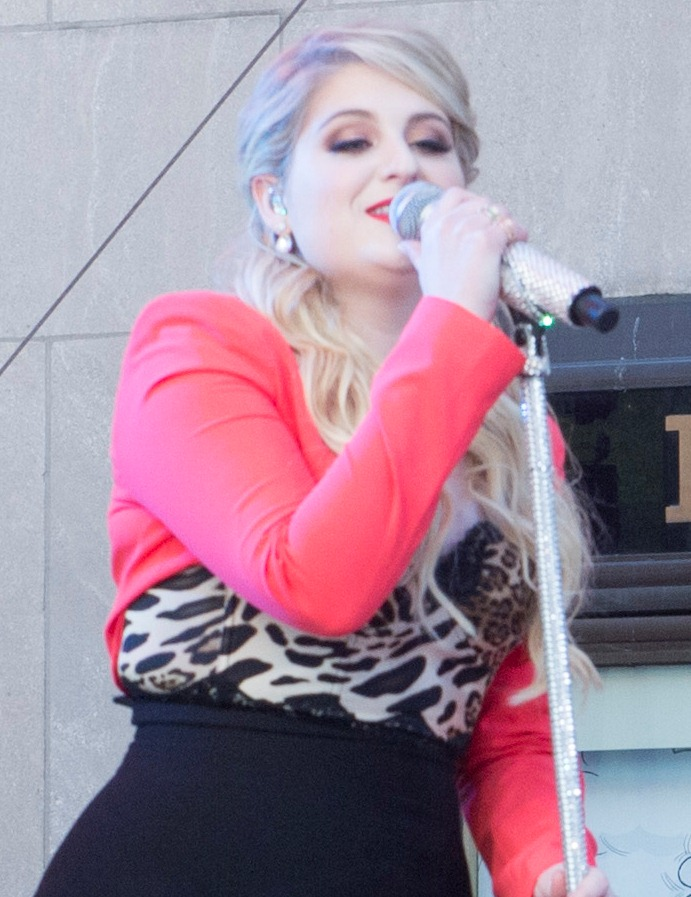
Meghan Trainor is featured and credited as co-writer on the track "Brave, Honest, Beautiful" and also co-wrote the single, "Sledgehammer".

Song	Writer(s)	Album(s)	Year	Ref.
"1000 Hands"	Adam Waldman; Jason Boyd; Georgia Ku	7/27	2016	
"All I Want for Christmas Is You" (Note: "All I Want for Christmas Is You" is a 1994 song written by Mariah Carey, the group recorded a cover of the song which was included in the extended play I'll Be Home for Christmas.)	Mariah Carey; Walter Afanasieff	I'll Be Home for Christmas	2014	
"All in My Head (Flex)" (Note: "All In My Head (Flex)" contains an interpolation of "Flex" written by Ewart Brown, Clifton Dillon, Richard Foulks, Herbert Harris, Daniel Gonzalez and Handel Tucker and performed by Mad Cobra.) Fifth Harmony featuring Fetty Wap	Ally Brooke; Camila Cabello; Dinah Jane; Lauren Jauregui; Normani Kordei; Mikkel Eriksen; Tor Erik Hermansen; Benjamin Levin; Willie Maxwell; Daystar Peterson; Nolan Lambroza; Julia Michaels; Brian Garcia; Willie Maxwell; Ewart Brown; Clifton Dillon; Richard Foulks; Herbert Harris; Daniel Gonzalez	7/27	2016	
"Angel"	Skrillex; Poo Bear	Fifth Harmony	2017	
"Better Together"	Harmony Samuels; Savan Kotecha; Jason Evigan; Rickard Göransson	Better Together	2013	
"Big Bad Wolf"	Evan "Kidd" Bogart; Clarence Coffee	7/27	2016	
"Body Rock" (Note: "Body Rock" contains an interpolation from "(I've Had) The Time of My Life", written by John DeNicola, Donald Markowitz and Franke Previte, performed by Bill Medley and Jennifer Warnes.)	Harmony Samuels; Theron Thomas; John DeNicola; Donald Markowitz; Franke Previte	Reflection	2015	
"Boss"	Eric Frederic; Joe Spargur; Daniel Kyriakides; Gamal Lewis; Jacob Kasher; Taylor Parks	Reflection	2014	
"Brave, Honest, Beautiful" (Note: "Brave Honest Beautiful" contains a portion of the composition "Bootylicious", written by Rob Fusari, Beyoncé Knowles, Kelendria Rowland, Falonte Moore and Stevie Nicks, performed by Destiny's Child.) Fifth Harmony featuring Meghan Trainor	Meghan Trainor; Beyoncé Knowles; Kelendria Rowland; Rob Fusari; Falonte Moore; Stevie Nicks	Reflection	2015	
"Bridges"	Tommy Brown; Anthony M. Jones; Sebastian Kole; Ally Brooke Hermandez; Lauren Jauregui	Fifth Harmony	2017	
"Deliver"	The Stereotypes; Taylor Parks; Whitney Phillips	Fifth Harmony	2017	
"Don't Say You Love Me"	Nate Cyphert; Ian Kirkpatrick; Henrik Barman Michaelsen; Edvard Forre Erfjord; Lisa Scinta	Fifth Harmony	2017	
"Don't Wanna Dance Alone"	Julian Bunetta; Andre Merrit; Ally Brooke; Camila Cabello; Dinah Jane Hansen; Lauren Jauregui; Normani Kordei	Better Together	2013	
"Dope"	Jack Antonoff; Julia Michaels; Justin Tranter	7/27	2016	
"Down" Fifth Harmony featuring Gucci Mane	Joshua Coleman; Radric Davis; Dallas Koehlke; Jude Demorest	Fifth Harmony	2017	
"Eres Tu" • (Note: "Eres Tu" is the Spanish-language re-recording of "Who Are You".)	Claudia Brant	Juntos (Note: "Juntos" is a Spanish version of the extended play, "Better Together".)	2013	
"Everlasting Love"	Victoria Monét; Shane Stevens	Reflection	2015	
"Going Nowhere"	Andre Merritt; Breana Marin; Priscilla Renea; Chris Aparri	Reflection	2015	
"Gonna Get Better" (Note: "Gonna Get Better" is a remake of Vybz Kartel's song "Gon' Get Better", the singer was credited as songwriter in 7/27 liner notes.)	Adidja Palmer; Linton Timajae White; Mario Antonia Dunwell	7/27	2016	
"He Like That" (Note: "He Like That" contains a portion of the composition "Pumps and a Bump", written by Dexter Ansley, Gerald Baillergeau, Ondreius Burgie, MC Hammer, George Clinton, Garry Shider and David Spradley, performed by MC Hammer.)	Ammo; DallasK; Ester Dean; Frank "Nitty" Brim; Dexter Ansley; Gerald Baillergeau; Ondreius Burgie; MC Hammer; George Clinton; Garry Shider; David Spradley	Fifth Harmony	2017	
"I Lied"	James Abrahart; Alexander Izquierdo; James "Gladius" Wong; Oliver "German" Peterhof; Jordan Johnson; Marcus Lomax; Stefan Johnson	7/27	2016	
"I'm in Love with a Monster" (Note: "I'm in Love with a Monster" was released as single for the film Hotel Transylvania 2.)	Harmony Samuels; Carmen Reece; Sarah Mancuso; Edgar Etienne; Ericka Coulter	Hotel Transylvania 2	2015	
"Leave My Heart Out of This"	Jason Evigan; Tebey Solomon Ottoh; Marcus Lomax; Stefan Johnson; Jordan Johnson	Better Together	2013	
"Like Mariah" (Note: "Like Mariah" contains elements of the composition "Always Be My Baby", written by Mariah Carey, Jermaine Dupri and Manuel Seal, Jr., performed by Mariah Carey.) Fifth Harmony featuring Tyga	J.R. Rotem; Raja Kumari; Justin Tranter; Michael Nguyen-Stevenson; Mariah Carey; Jermaine Dupri; Manuel Seal, Jr.	Reflection	2015	
"Lonely Night"	Jason Evigan; Dyo; Dinah Jane; Normani Kordei; The Monsters and the Strangerz	Fifth Harmony	2017	
"Make You Mad"	Daniel Janes; Leah Haywood; Rob Ellmore; Ally Brooke Hermandez; Dinah Jane; Lauren Jauregui; Normani Kordei	Fifth Harmony	2017	
"Me & My Girls"	Ally Brooke; Camila Cabello; Dinah Jane; Lauren Jauregui; Normani Kordei; Julian Bunetta; Patrick James Bianco; Beau Alexandrè Dozier; John Ryan	Better Together	2013	
"Messy" (Note: "Messy" contains a portion of the composition "It Wasn't Me", written by Shaggy, Rikrok, Shaun Pizzonia and Brian Thompson, performed by Shaggy featuring Rikrok, which interpolates "Smile Happy", performed by War, written by Thomas Allen, Harold Brown, Morris Dickerson, Leroy Jordan, Charles Miller, Lee Levitin, and Howard Scott.)	Daniel Janes; Leah Haywood; Rob Ellmore; Ally Brooke Hermandez; Normani Kordei; Thomas Allen; Harold Ray Brown; Shaggy; B. B. Dickerson; Rikrok; Gerry Goldstein; Lonnie Jordan; Lee Oskar; Charles Miller; Shaun Pizzonia; Howard E. Scott; Brian Thompson	Fifth Harmony	2017	
"Miss Movin' On"	Mitch Allan; Jason Evigan; Lindy Robbins; Julia Michaels; Toby Gad; Ali Tamposi	Better Together	2013	
"No Way"	Victoria Monét	7/27	2016	
"Noche de Paz" •	Franz Xaver Gruber; Josephus Franciscus Mohr	I'll Be Home for Christmas	2014	
"Not That Kinda Girl" Fifth Harmony featuring Missy Elliott	Melissa Elliott; Negin Djafari; Jared Cotter; Aaron Pearce	7/27	2016	
"One Wish"	Sam Watters; Louis Biancaniello; Michael Biancaniello; Marcus Lomax; Clarence Coffee, Jr. Jordan Johnson; Stefan Johnson	Better Together	2013	
"Que Bailes Conmigo Hoy" • (Note: "Que Bailes Conmigo Hoy" is the Spanish-language re-recording of "Don't Wanna Dance Alone".)	Claudia Brant	Juntos	2013	
"Que El Corazon No Hable Por Mi" • (Note: "Que El Corazon No Hable Por Mi" is the Spanish-language re-recording of "Leave My Heart Out Of This".)	Claudia Brant	Juntos	2013	
"Reflection"	Victoria Monét; Julia Bunetta; Jacob Kasher	Reflection	2015	
"Sauced Up"	Harmony Samuels; Edgar "JV" Etienne; Varren Wade; Candace Shields; Ryan Toby; Ally Brooke Hermandez; Lauren Jauregui	Fifth Harmony	2017	
"Scared Of Happy"	Tinashe Kachingwe; Cass Lowe; Mikkel Eriksen; Tor Erik Hermansen; Michael Tucker	7/27	2016	
"Sin Contrato" • Maluma featuring Fifth Harmony	Edgar Barrera; Andrés Castro; Juan Luis Londoño	Pretty Boy, Dirty Boy	2015	
"Sin Tu Amor" • (Note: "Sin Tu Amor" is the Spanish-language re-recording of "Miss Movin' On".)	Claudia Brant	Juntos	2013	
"Sledgehammer"	Jonas Jeberg; Meghan Trainor; Sean Douglas	Reflection	2014	
"Squeeze"	Mikkel Eriksen; Tor Erik Hermansen; Kyrre Gørvell-Dahll; Nolan Lambroza; Priscilla Renea Hamilton; Simon Wilcox	7/27	2016	
"Suga Mama"	Meghan Trainor; Chris "Flict" Aparri	Reflection	2015	
"That's My Girl"	Tinashe Kachingwe; Alexander Kronlund; Lukas Loules	7/27	2016	
"The Life"	Tinashe Kachingwe; Alexander Kronlund; Lukas Loules	7/27	2016	
"Them Girls Be Like"	James Abrahart; Victoria Monét; Tinashe Sibanda; Emily Warren; Britt Burton	Reflection	2015	
"This Is How We Roll"	Lukasz Gottwald; Theron Thomas; Henry Walter	Reflection	2015	
"Top Down"	Linnéa Deb; Joy Deb; Anton Malmberg Hård af Segerstad; Maurice Simmonds	Reflection	2015	
"Tu Eres Lo Que Yo Quiero" • (Note: "Tu Eres Lo Que Yo Quiero" is the Spanish-language re-recording of "Better Together".)	Claudia Brant	Juntos	2013	
"Vienes o Voy" • Juan Gabriel featuring Fifth Harmony	Juan Gabriel	Los Dúo	2015	
"We Know"	Victoria Monét; Kyle Stewart	Reflection	2015	
"Who Are You"	Ally Brooke; Camila Cabello; Dinah Jane Hansen; Lauren Jauregui; Normani Kordei; Julian Bunetta; Patrick James Bianco; Nasri Tony Atweh	Better Together	2013	
"Work from Home" Fifth Harmony featuring Ty Dolla Sign	Tyrone Griffin, Jr. Alexander Izquierdo; Joshua Coleman; Jude Demorest; Dallas Koehlke; Brian Lee	7/27	2016	
"Worth It" (Note: Fifth Harmony also recorded a Spanish version of "Worth It" titled "Worth It" (Dame Esta Noche).) Fifth Harmony featuring Kid Ink	Priscilla Renea; Mikkel S. Eriksen; Tor Erik Hermansen; Ori Kaplan	Reflection	2015	
"Write on Me"	Mikkel Eriksen; Tor Erik Hermansen; Kyrre Gørvell-Dahll; Priscilla Renea; Simon Wilcox	7/27	2016	

== See also ==
- Fifth Harmony discography
