= The Reflection Tour =

2015–16 concert tour by Fifth Harmony

- Tour by Fifth Harmony
- Promotional poster for the tour
- Location: Asia; Europe; North America
- Associated album: Reflection
- Start date: February 27, 2015
- End date: February 12, 2016
- Legs: 5
- No. of shows: 63

Fifth Harmony concert chronology
- Fifth Times a Charm Tour (2014); The Reflection Tour (2015–16); The 7/27 Tour (2016–17)

The Reflection Tour was the fourth concert tour by American girl group Fifth Harmony. Visiting Europe, North America and Asia (one date in Adu Dhabi), the tour supported their debut studio album, Reflection (2015). Fifth Harmony was not backed by a band or backing singers, instead, they opted for studio recorded versions of songs from their album and an acoustic set for covers. The setlist consisted mostly of songs from Reflection, with several adapted from their debut extended play, Better Together (2013), along with several medley covers. The shows garnered acclaim from critical reviews, many praising the group's vocal performance, the show's overall themes and the song transitions.

The first North American leg of the tour was uninterrupted. However, for the second North American leg, which ran from July until October, the group cancelled two dates, citing a performance at the BET Players Awards for July 18, three days after their second leg started. On the other date, two of the members were diagnosed with bronchitis, prompting them to cancel the Washington show on September 16. These dates were not rescheduled. Both legs of the tour sold out the majority of its shows and received positive reviews. Yahoo! livestreamed the March 24 Boston concert.

Different sets were utilized for different legs of the tour. In the first leg, concerts were structured with photographer umbrella lights serving as the background for every show. Props such as a car were used in several tracks. The photographer umbrella lights were used in smaller numbers, with only several placed on the top of the stage and a five-piece screen in the background. For the third leg of the tour, a standard red backdrop and multiple stage lights, both up and down, were used along with a different outfit color. Including every date on this tour, the first show began on February 27, 2015 in San Francisco and ended on Abu Dhabi on February 12, 2016, nearly a year after the tour's initial announcement. Sixteen of the twenty-five dates were sold out.

== Background ==
Following Fifth Harmony's success on the American televised singing competition The X Factor, the group released their debut extended play, Better Together. Before releasing their extended play, the group was an opening act for the I Wish Tour, headlined by Cher Lloyd. The following year, MTV selected the group as part of a series of Artists to Watch. The concert series saw them perform several tracks from their debut studio album, Reflection. Simultaneously, the girls were opening acts on Demi Lovato's Neon Lights Tour, performing in arenas throughout North America.

MTV nominated the group under its "Artist to Watch" category, along other rising acts. Fifth Harmony would end up winning the category at the 2014 MTV Video Music Awards and become the first all-female group to win this title. The following year, an MTV-sponsored headlining tour was announced in January 2015. This was to be Fifth Harmony's first major tour following small-scale headlining tours in 2013 and 2014, and slots as opening acts on tours for artists such as Lovato and Lloyd.

In conjunction with the tour announcement on January 7, 2015, a cover of the hit song "Uptown Funk" was uploaded onto Fifth Harmony's YouTube account, featuring the group and their three opening acts: Jacob Whitesides, Jasmine V, and Mahogany Lox.

== Extensions ==
=== Reflection: The Summer Tour ===
One of several promotional posters used for Reflection: The Summer Tour.

After completing the first leg of the tour, the group decided to go on another leg in North America. This tour was a revamped version of the original tour, in which they were performing more songs in new and bigger venues. The group announced the summer leg of the tour at a poolside party sponsored by Candie's with the event broadcast by Periscope.

On this tour, Fifth Harmony wore their first ever custom-designed costumes by Marina Toybina, a four-time Emmy award winner. Choreography for this setlist was conducted by Sean Bankhead, who worked on the group's dance routine for their single "Worth It".

The first show started on July 15 and ended on September 16 for a total of 31 shows, all located in the United States except for one show in The Bahamas. New production and a different setlist including new covers and more songs were planned for this leg of the tour.

=== European Reflection Tour ===
Promotional poster used for Reflection: The European Tour.

The success of the group's previous tour legs prompted them to issue another extension. This was the group's first tour to feature European dates. It was announced on September 2, 2015 through the photo sharing app, Snapchat, with each member announcing a different city through their individual accounts. The tour began on October 26 and concluded on November 9.

All the shows in this tour were reportedly sold out. Dionne Bromfield was the opening act for shows in London and Manchester and Paul Rey for shows in Paris and Frankfurt. The group performed songs in five countries around Europe, including Spain, France, and the United Kingdom.

The outfits used for this leg remained the same from previous extensions, with the exception being a change in color. For this leg, the group's outfits featured an all red design, a distinction from the blue color the girls used in their previous tours. Toybina returned as the designer for the group's outfits, who has designed concert outfits for notable artists such as Katy Perry, Ariana Grande, and Taylor Swift.

The promotional poster for the leg featured the same image used for the cover art of the 2015 animated fantasy comedy film Hotel Transylvania 2 track, "I'm in Love with a Monster". The poster was revealed through the group's individual social media accounts.

== Opening acts ==
- Jacob Whitesides (North America—Leg 1)
- Jasmine V (North America—Leg 1)
- Mahogany Lox (North America—Leg 1)
- Bea Miller (North America—Leg 2)
- Natalie La Rose (North America—Leg 2)
- Debby Ryan and The Never Ending (North America—Leg 2)
- Dionne Bromfield (United Kingdom—Leg 3)
- Paul Rey (France and Germany—Leg 3)

== Set lists ==
Reflection Tour
1. "Reflection"
2. "Going Nowhere"
3. "Miss Movin' On"
4. "Sledgehammer"
5. "Better Together"
6. "Suga Mama"
7. "Worth It"
8. "Interlude: Body Rock/Them Girls Be Like" (Instrumental)
9. "Who Are You"
10. "Take Me to Church" (Hozier song)
11. "We Know"
12. "We Belong Together" / "Shake It Off" / "Always Be My Baby" (Mariah Carey medley)
13. "Like Mariah"
14. "Everlasting Love"
15. "Top Down"
16. "This Is How We Roll"
17. "Boss"
18. "Brave Honest Beautiful"
Summer Tour
1. "Boss"
2. "Reflection"
3. "Going Nowhere"
4. "Miss Movin' On" / "We Will Rock You" (Note: This is a cover originally performed by British rock band Queen.) / "Bad Blood" (Note: This is a cover originally performed by American artist Taylor Swift.) / "Bitch Better Have My Money" (Note: This is a cover originally performed by Barbadian singer Rihanna.)
5. "Sledgehammer"
6. "Suga Mama"
7. "Them Girls Be Like"
8. "Top Down"
9. "Better Together"
10. "This Is How We Roll"
11. "Brave Honest Beautiful"
12. "Like Mariah"
13. "We Know"
14. "Who Are You"
15. "Want to Want Me" (Note: This is a cover originally performed by American R&B and hip hop artist Jason Derulo.) / "Can't Feel My Face" (Note: This is a cover originally performed by Canadian alternative R&B singer The Weeknd/Abel Tesfaye.) / "Don't" (Note: This is a cover originally performed by British guitarist Ed Sheeran.) / "You Need Me, I Don't Need You" (Note: This is a cover originally performed by British guitarist Ed Sheeran.) / "Am I Wrong" (Note: This is a cover originally performed by Norwegian afrobeat duo Nico & Vinz.)
16. "Dreamlover" (Mariah Carey cover)
17. "Everlasting Love"
18. "Worth It"
19. "Body Rock"

- Note: All songs in the summer leg are performed in the European leg except "Them Girls Be Like", which was replaced with "I'm in Love with a Monster".

== Critical response ==
The tour was well received from critics with many praising the group's empowerment themes. In a positive review of the Bethlehem show, Matt Christine from Sight of Sound, complemented the group for their cohesiveness, stating that their, "sound is monumental in scale when they sang together as a unit." He continues his review by praising the group for not "embracing the stereotypical pop" many artists follow and the setlist, calling it "incredibly smart choice for the group as these songs are incredibly strong and the majority of their fans who came out expected to hear just those tracks." Erica Rucker of Leo Weekly praised the group for their empowering themes on the Louisville show, saying, "[b]eing told that you are beautiful and “Worth It” can actually save a young life." She concludes that statement by stating that, "no matter what it takes, no matter who tells young people that they matter — be it a pop group or the smiling parents who snapped cell photos of the children on the sly — kids need to know that they have value."

Mikael Wood of the Los Angeles Times praised the group's song transition at the Los Angeles show, from the "rugged cover of Hozier's "Take Me to Church"", to the "miniature rave" for "This Is How We Roll" and the "confetti blast" at the show's last song, "Boss", which Wood reminisced to a stadium feel. His only criticism came from the record voice encouraging the audience members that they were "capable of achieving" their "wildest dreams". Wood finishes his review by saying that "when Fifth Harmony was showing rather than telling — almost made you believe it." In a review adapted by USA Today from Serene Dominic, writer for The Arizona Republic, Dominic complimented the vocal abilities of the five girls, highlighting Ally Brooke for her "whistle register". She found the acoustic set "perplexing" but overall remained positive rain her review.

In a positive review of the Wilbur show in Boston, Maura Johnston of The Boston Globe commended the group for their vocals and the show's overall theme. Johnston expands on the reasoning behind Fifth Harmony's success, saying they have a "muscle to succeed where other girl bands failed, and why its followers, who packed the theater to capacity, are so loyal." She also highlight the brand the group holds, which is embodied by the female-empowerment. During the Mariah Carey medley, Johnston noted how there was "equal time being distributed among the members" and how any "diva moments" were "absent" on stage.

Some critics were not so positive. In a mixed-positive review, Amanda Ventura of Phoenix New Times raved about the group's vocals, in particular, Brooke who described her note as a "Mariah Carey-level high F meant to induce goosebumps on anyone with ears". Ventura criticized the first half of the show, calling it "terrible" and something out of a "well-funded talent show performance". She comments on the group's chemistry which seemed "off". One of the acts that she said was "worth sitting through" was Bea Miller, who compared her vocal range to Janis Joplin. Conversely, Elliot Friar of Emertainment Weekly, in review of the Boston show, commended the performances of the opening acts and the empowering effect the group left on stage saying that the stage was left with "one last roar of empowerment, self-love, and love for others."

Chris Gray from The Houston Press ranked the Houston show in the top five concerts of the week, for the week dated August 3.

== Shows ==
List of 2015 concerts
Date (2015)	City	Country	Venue	Opening acts	Attendance	Revenue
February 27	San Francisco	United States	Regency Ballroom	Jacob Whitesides; Jasmine V Mahogany Lox	—N/a	—N/a
February 28	San Diego	United States	House of Blues	Jacob Whitesides; Jasmine V Mahogany Lox	1,096 / 1,096	$33,190
March 1	Los Angeles	United States	Club Nokia	Jacob Whitesides; Jasmine V Mahogany Lox	—N/a	—N/a
March 4	Dallas	United States	South Side Ballroom	Jacob Whitesides; Jasmine V Mahogany Lox	1,338 / 1,338	$43,485
March 5	Houston	United States	Warehouse Live	Jacob Whitesides; Jasmine V Mahogany Lox	1,656 / 1,656	$53,820
March 6	Fort Lauderdale	United States	Parker Playhouse	Jacob Whitesides; Jasmine V Mahogany Lox	1,090 / 1,090	$38,508
March 8 (Note: The March 8, 2015 show is part of the Busch Gardens Food & Wine Festival 2015.)	Tampa	United States	Busch Gardens Tampa Bay	Jacob Whitesides; Jasmine V Mahogany Lox	—N/a	—N/a
March 9	Atlanta	United States	Buckhead Theatre	Jacob Whitesides; Jasmine V Mahogany Lox	1,465 / 1,465	$47,613
March 10	Charlotte	United States	Amos' Southend	Jacob Whitesides; Jasmine V Mahogany Lox	1,259 / 1,291	$40,918
March 11	Norfolk	United States	The NorVa	Jacob Whitesides; Jasmine V Mahogany Lox	1,259 / 1,450	$33,993
March 12	Richmond	United States	The National	Jacob Whitesides; Jasmine V Mahogany Lox	1,500 / 1,500	$44,250
March 14	Chicago	United States	The Vic Theatre	Jacob Whitesides; Jasmine V Mahogany Lox	1,358 / 1,364	$47,887
March 15	Indianapolis	United States	Egyptian Room	Jacob Whitesides; Jasmine V Mahogany Lox	1,776 / 1,931	$48,385
March 16	Royal Oak	United States	Royal Oak Music Theatre	Jacob Whitesides; Jasmine V Mahogany Lox	1,700 / 1,700	$55,705
March 17	Toronto	Canada	Sound Academy	Jacob Whitesides; Jasmine V Mahogany Lox	2,085 / 2,235	$62,772
March 18	Youngstown	United States	Stambaugh Auditorium	Jacob Whitesides; Jasmine V Mahogany Lox	1,638 / 2,056	$58,030
March 20	Red Bank	United States	Count Basie Theatre	Jacob Whitesides; Jasmine V Mahogany Lox	1,482 / 1,482	$52,945
March 21	Clifton Park	United States	Upstate Town Hall	Jacob Whitesides; Jasmine V Mahogany Lox	1,300 / 1,300	$38,350
March 22	Mashantucket	United States	MGM Grand Theater	Jacob Whitesides; Jasmine V Mahogany Lox	2,802 / 2,802	$110,777
March 23	New York City	United States	David Geffen Hall	Jacob Whitesides; Jasmine V Mahogany Lox	2,024 / 2,024	$70,840
March 24	Boston	United States	Wilbur Theatre	Jacob Whitesides; Jasmine V Mahogany Lox	1,149 / 1,149	$40,957
March 26	Bethlehem	United States	Sands Bethlehem Event Center	Jacob Whitesides; Jasmine V Mahogany Lox	1,833 / 1,833	$74,761
March 27	Glenside	United States	Keswick Theatre	Jacob Whitesides; Jasmine V Mahogany Lox	1,267 / 1,267	$44,088
July 15	Louisville	United States	The Louisville Palace	Bea Miller; Natalie La Rose; The Never Ending	—N/a	—N/a
July 17	Lakewood	United States	Lakewood Civic Auditorium	Bea Miller; Natalie La Rose; The Never Ending	—N/a	—N/a
July 20	Atlanta	United States	John A. Williams Theater	Bea Miller; Natalie La Rose; The Never Ending	—N/a	—N/a
July 21	Nashville	United States	Grand Ole Opry	Bea Miller; Natalie La Rose; The Never Ending	—N/a	—N/a
July 23	St. Louis	United States	Peabody Opera House	Bea Miller; Natalie La Rose; The Never Ending	—N/a	—N/a
July 24	Rogers	United States	Walmart Arkansas Music Pavilion	Bea Miller; Natalie La Rose; The Never Ending	—N/a	—N/a
July 25	Baton Rouge	United States	F.G. Clark Center	Bea Miller; Natalie La Rose; The Never Ending	—N/a	—N/a
July 26	Birmingham	United States	BJCC Concert Hall	Bea Miller; Natalie La Rose; The Never Ending	—N/a	—N/a
July 28	Jacksonville	United States	Florida Theatre	Bea Miller; Natalie La Rose; The Never Ending	—N/a	—N/a
July 29	Miami Beach	United States	Jackie Gleason Theater	Bea Miller; Natalie La Rose; The Never Ending	—N/a	—N/a
July 30	Clearwater	United States	Ruth Eckerd Hall	Bea Miller; Natalie La Rose; The Never Ending	—N/a	—N/a
July 31	Orlando	United States	Walt Disney Theater	Bea Miller; Natalie La Rose; The Never Ending	—N/a	—N/a
August 2	San Antonio	United States	H-E-B Performance Hall	Bea Miller; Natalie La Rose; The Never Ending	—N/a	—N/a
August 3	Houston	United States	NRG Arena	Bea Miller; Natalie La Rose; The Never Ending	—N/a	—N/a
August 4	Midland	United States	Wagner Noël Center	Bea Miller; Natalie La Rose; The Never Ending	1,750 / 1,750	$69,420
August 5	Grand Prairie	United States	Verizon Theatre	Bea Miller; Natalie La Rose; The Never Ending	—N/a	—N/a
August 7	Phoenix	United States	Comerica Theatre	Bea Miller; Natalie La Rose; The Never Ending	—N/a	—N/a
August 8 (Note: The August 8, 2015 show is part of the Orange County Fair 2015.)	Costa Mesa	United States	Pacific Amphitheatre	Bea Miller; Natalie La Rose; The Never Ending	—N/a	—N/a
August 9	San Jose	United States	Event Center at SJSU	Bea Miller; Natalie La Rose; The Never Ending	—N/a	—N/a
August 11	Santa Rosa	United States	Ruth Finley Person Theater	Bea Miller; Natalie La Rose; The Never Ending	—N/a	—N/a
August 12	Bakersfield	United States	Rabobank Arena	Bea Miller; Natalie La Rose; The Never Ending	—N/a	—N/a
August 13	Las Vegas	United States	Pearl Concert Theater	Bea Miller; Natalie La Rose; The Never Ending	—N/a	—N/a
August 18	Denver	United States	Paramount Theatre	Bea Miller; Natalie La Rose; The Never Ending	—N/a	—N/a
August 20	Kansas City	United States	Uptown Theatre	Bea Miller; Natalie La Rose; The Never Ending	—N/a	—N/a
August 21	Milwaukee	United States	Milwaukee Theatre	Bea Miller; Natalie La Rose; The Never Ending	—N/a	—N/a
August 23	Buffalo	United States	Shea's Performing Arts Center	Bea Miller; Natalie La Rose; The Never Ending	—N/a	—N/a
August 24	Albany	United States	Palace Theatre	Bea Miller; Natalie La Rose; The Never Ending	—N/a	—N/a
August 26	Washington, D.C.	United States	DAR Constitution Hall	Bea Miller; Natalie La Rose; The Never Ending	—N/a	—N/a
August 27	New York City	United States	Beacon Theatre	Bea Miller; Natalie La Rose; The Never Ending	—N/a	—N/a
September 4 (Note: The September 4, 2015 show is part of the New York State Fair 2015.)	Syracuse	United States	Chevrolet Court	—N/a	—N/a	—N/a
September 5 (Note: The September 5, 2015 show is part of the Maryland State Fair 2015.)	Timonium	United States	Maryland State Fairgrounds	—N/a	—N/a	—N/a
October 10 (Note: The October 10, 2015 show is part of the Atlantic Live concert at Atlantic Theatre.)	Paradise Island	The Bahamas	Atlantic Theatre	—N/a	—N/a	—N/a
October 26	Madrid	Spain	La Riviera	—N/a	—N/a	—N/a
October 31	Amsterdam	Netherlands	Melkweg	—N/a	—N/a	—N/a
November 3	London	England	Shepherd's Bush Empire	Dionne Bromfield	—N/a	—N/a
November 4	Manchester	England	O_{2} Ritz Manchester	Dionne Bromfield	—N/a	—N/a
November 8	Frankfurt	Germany	Jahrhunderthalle	Paul Rey	—N/a	—N/a
November 9	Paris	France	Salle Pleyel	Paul Rey	—N/a	—N/a
November 25	Mexico City	Mexico	El Plaza Condesa	ARI; Meli G	—N/a	—N/a

List of 2016 concerts
Date (2016)	City	Country	Venue	Opening acts	Attendance	Revenue
February 12 (Note: The February 12, 2016 show is part of RedfestDXB 2016.)	Abu Dhabi	United Arab Emirates	Abu Dhabi Amphitheatre	—N/a	—N/a	—N/a
Total					32,827 / 35,710 (92%)	$1,110,694

== Canceled shows ==
List of canceled concerts, showing date, city, country, venue, and reason for cancelation
Date	City	Country	Venue	Reason
July 18, 2015	Cincinnati	United States	PNC Pavilion	Performing at the BET Players Awards
September 16, 2015 (Note: The September 16, 2015 show would be part of the Washington State Fair 2015.)	Puyallup	United States	Columbia Bank Grandstand	Illness
