= Sweet Daddy =

Sweet Daddy may refer to:

- Variation of Daddy (slang)
- Sweet Daddy Williams, character on the American sitcom Good Times portrayed by Theodore Wilson
- Sweet Daddy Siki
- Sweet Daddy, short 1921 Marcel Perez film
- Sweet Daddy Dee, character portrayed by ventriloquist Jeff Dunham
- Sweet Daddy Grace, nickname for Marcelino Manuel da Graça

== See also ==
- Sugar Daddy
