= Suga Mama (disambiguation) =

"Suga Mama" is a song from Beyoncé Knowles's B'Day album.

Suga Mama may also refer to:

- Suga Mama (band), the all-female backing band for Beyoncé
- "Suga Mama", a song by Fifth Harmony from their debut album Reflection
- Charlette "Suga Mama" Towne-Proud, a character on the animated series The Proud Family and The Proud Family: Louder and Prouder

== See also ==
- Sugar Mama (disambiguation)
