= Sugar Mama =

A sugar mama is a woman who offers support (typically financial and material) to a younger companion in exchange for romantic or sexual pleasure.

Sugar Mama may refer to:

- Sugar Mama (confectionery), a candy
- "Sugar Mama" (song), a Tampa Red song
- Sugar Mama, an album by The Dirty Rooks
- "Sugar Mama", a song by Dua Saleh
- "Sugar Mama", a song by Bitter:Sweet from Drama

== See also ==
- Suga Mama (disambiguation)
- Sugar Daddy (disambiguation)
- Sugar Man (disambiguation)
- Sugar Baby (disambiguation)
