= Reflection (Fifth Harmony album) =

- Standard edition cover. The deluxe edition cover features the same image, except in color.

Studio album by Fifth Harmony
- Released: January 30, 2015
- Recorded: March–August 2014
- Studios: 1916 Studios (North Hollywood, California); Beluga Heights Studios (Los Angeles, California); Big Noize Studios (Los Angeles); Eightysevenfourteen Studios (Los Angeles); I Wanna Go to Hawaii...Yay Studios (Kilauea, Hawaii); The Enemy Dojo; Westlake Recording Studios (Los Angeles); Windmark Recording Studio (Santa Monica, California); Conway Recording Studios (Hollywood); Luke's In the Boo (Malibu, California); The Venice Studio (Venice, California); The Record Plant (Los Angeles); The Hide Out Studios (London, United Kingdom)
- Genres: Pop; dance-pop; R&B
- Length: 37:35
- Labels: Epic; Syco
- Producers: Joy Deb; Linnea Deb; Anton Hård af Segerstad; Joe Spargur; Daylight; Taylor Parks; Jonas Jeberg; Harvey Mason, Jr.; Stargate; Ori Kaplan; Dr. Luke; Cirkut; Emily Warren; Britt Burton; Tommy Parker; Tommy Brown; Travis Sayles; J.R. Rotem; Tinashe Sibanda; Victoria Monét; Julian Bunetta; Chris Flict Aparri; Deon Sanders

Fifth Harmony chronology
| Better Together (2013) | Reflection (2015) | 7/27 (2016) |

Singles from Reflection
- 1. "Boss" Released: July 7, 2014; 2. "Sledgehammer" Released: October 28, 2014; 3. "Worth It" Released: January 19, 2015

Reflection is the debut studio album by American girl group Fifth Harmony. It was released on January 30, 2015, by Syco Music and Epic Records. Lyrically, the album discusses themes of female-empowerment, romance, heartbreak and confidence. Musically, Reflection is primarily a pop record and showcases synthpop, "grungy" hip hop and R&B sounds. The album features guest appearances by American rappers Kid Ink and Tyga, as well as American singer-songwriter Meghan Trainor, and collaborations with several producers including Ori Kaplan, Dr. Luke and Stargate.

The album received generally positive reviews from contemporary music critics. Commercially, the album entered the Billboard 200 at number five, earning the group their first top-five entry in the United States with sales of 80,000 equivalent units—62,000 of those coming from traditional album sales. Reflection entered the top twenty in the United Kingdom, after peaking at number eighteen, and charted within the top ten in countries such as Canada, New Zealand and Spain. The album charted within the top thirty in ten other countries. To further promote the album, the group embarked on their fourth headlining concert tour, the Reflection Tour, visiting the United States, Canada, Mexico and Europe.

Reflection was supported by three singles: its lead single, "Boss", released on July 7, 2014, followed by "Sledgehammer" premiering on October 28, 2014, and "Worth It" featuring Kid Ink, the last single, was released on January 19, 2015. All three singles made appearances in the top fifty of the Billboard Hot 100, peaking individually at 43, 40 and 12, respectively. "Worth It" became the album's most successful single, charting in the top ten in thirteen countries. In the United States, both "Boss" and "Sledgehammer" achieved platinum certification, while "Worth It" was certified triple platinum. Since its release, the album has sold 155,000 pure copies in the United States. Reflection has since been certified Platinum by Recording Industry Association of America for combined sales, streaming and track equivalent units of 1 million.

== Background and release ==
After finishing in third place on the second season of The X Factor, and releasing their debut extended play titled Better Together, Fifth Harmony announced they would be releasing a full-length album in the spring of 2014. During the voting stages of the 2014 MTV Video Music Awards, where Fifth Harmony was nominated in the Artist to Watch category, fans were asked to vote for the group a certain number of times to help unlock the album's cover art. The title and the cover of the album were unveiled on Fifth Harmony's official website on August 12, 2014. After receiving negative feedback from fans, the group revealed a new album cover on August 23, 2014. The album's release date was delayed several times during the last quarter of 2014 and early 2015, and was ultimately released in the United States on February 3, 2015.

== Recording and development ==
"We walk into the studio—we were given this song—and it was basically Kid's song. There were no females on the song. When Stargate gave us the song, we changed some of the lyrics and a bit of the concepts to make it fit our perspective. Then we went into the studio without thinking we were ever going to take it this far."

— Dinah Jane, on the background and recording of the album's third single, "Worth It"

They recorded 60 songs in total for the album. During an interview with Billboard before the album's release, Fifth Harmony said the album would signal a more mature sound for the group. "We've started recording and getting into that process, we have shifted the lane a bit and made it a more mature sound, because obviously, we're growing up too." Lauren Jauregui also told Billboard during an interview that the album's recording was set to begin in April 2014, and said its sound would be less pop than their earlier work on Better Together.

During the album's production, the group worked with a variety of collaborators. The Norwegian production duo Stargate wrote and co-produced the song "Worth It" with musician Ori Kaplan who also played the saxophone. It was recorded at three different studios: Westlake Recording Studios in Los Angeles and Windmark Recording in Santa Monica, California, and The Hide Out Studio located in London, England. Jaycen Joshua mixed the song, assisted by Ryan Kaul and Maddox Chhim, at Larrabee Sound Studios in North Hollywood, California.

Producer Dr. Luke contributed to the track "This Is How We Roll" along with Cirkut. It was recorded at Conway Recording Studios in Hollywood and Luke's In the Boo in Malibu, California. Serban Ghenea mixed the song at MixStar Studios. The group also worked with Tommy Brown who recreated a '90's R&B sound for the song "Everlasting Love" with Travis Sayles and produced the stripped-down track "We Know". Singer-songwriter Victoria Monét wrote and produced the group's vocals on both songs and handled the co-production of the title track, "Them Girls Be Like" produced by T-Collar with additional production by Monét. "Everlasting Love", "Reflection", "Them Girls Be Like" and "We Know" were recorded at Vietnam Studios.

The album's lead single, "Boss", written by Eric Frederic, Joe Spargur, Daniel Kyriakides, Gamal Lewis, Jacob Kasher and Taylor Parks, was produced by Ricky Reed with Joe London and Daylight. It was recorded at The Venice Studio in Venice, Los Angeles, and The Record Plant also in Los Angeles. Singer Meghan Trainor contributed vocals on "Brave, Honest, Beautiful" and co-wrote the songs "Sledgehammer" and "Suga Mama". Chris "Flict" Aparri (credited as "Flict") handled the production for the three tracks. The three songs were recorded at Windmark Recording Studios.

== Composition ==
=== Music and lyrics ===
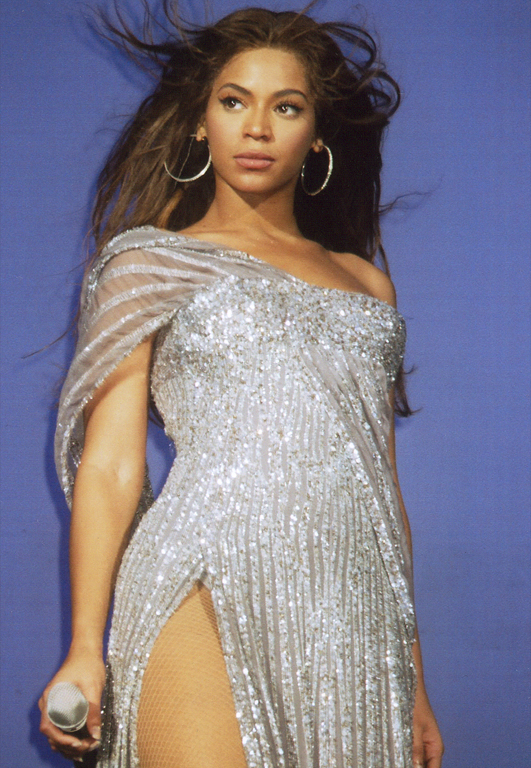
Several critics compared the album to works by Beyoncé. The singer's influence can be heard on songs such as "Boss", "Them Girls Be Like" and "Reflection".

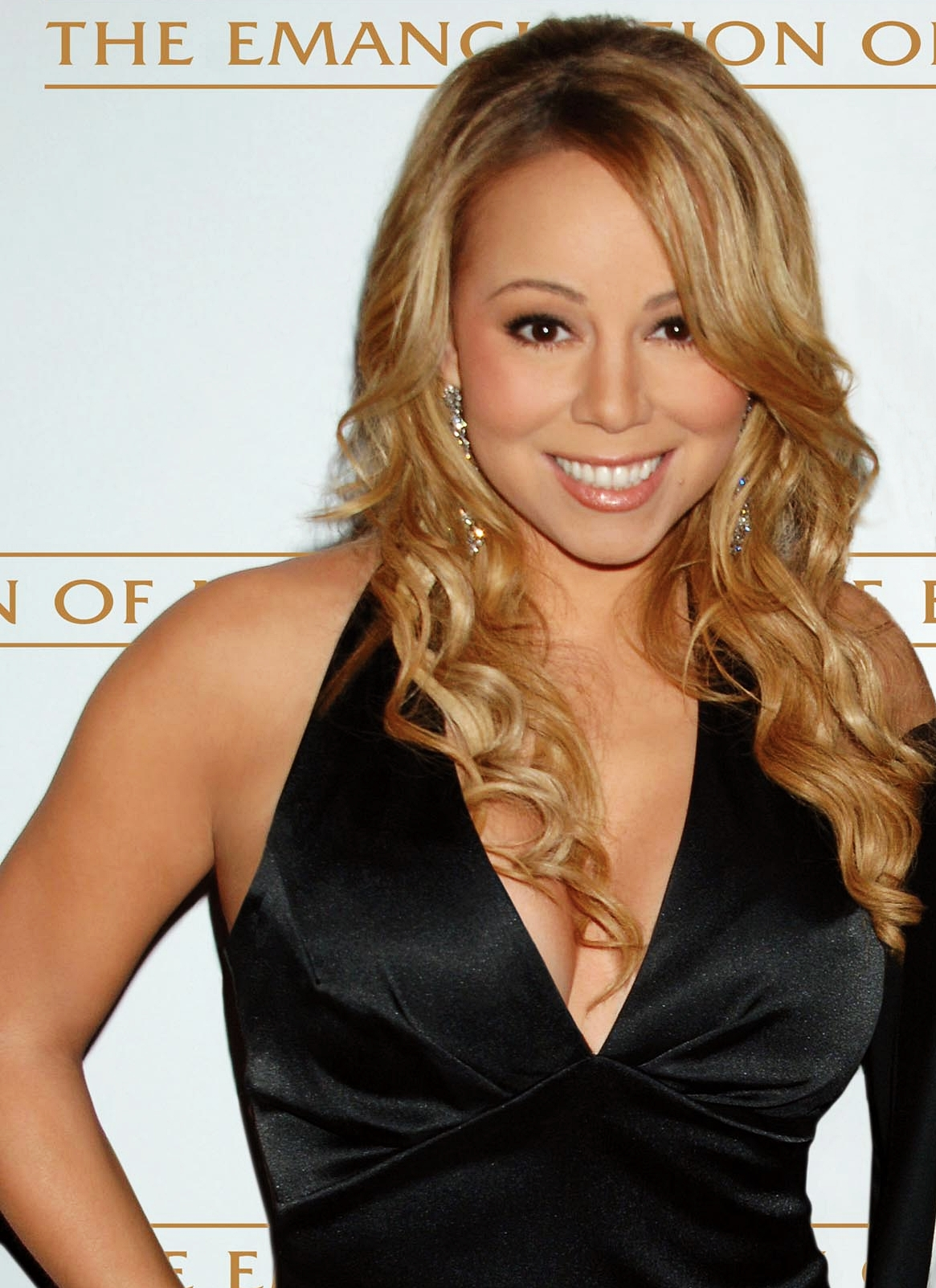
The group refers to several female icons, including singer Mariah Carey who was praised with the track "Like Mariah".

Musically, Reflection explores a variety of musical genres. As noted by Matt Collar, of AllMusic, the album spans "electronic-infused dance music to synthy, rhythmically bumptious hip-hop to retro-'90s R&B." Jason Lipshutz, from Billboard also noted the diversity present in the album's production, commenting that the group shows "that they are capable of slick synth-pop, grungy hip-hop and fluttering R&B" and adds that the "latter [is] clearly indebted to the girl groups of the '90s". The songs share similar production and instrumentation. For example, horns can be heard during the hook on the first track "Top Down", and are also introduced in the second song "Boss", serving as support instruments. They also appear on the third track "Worth It".

The lyrics explore themes of feminism and female empowerment. Meaghan Garvey of Pitchfork described the album as "an album of fun, feminist pop that is simultaneously wise beyond its years and refreshingly age-appropriate—and it effortlessly embodies the ideals grasped at by the girl power think piece wave, with a sharp, nuanced perspective that can only come from lived experience".

Several critics noted the influence of singer Beyoncé on the album comparing it to her work. During the song "Them Girls Be Like", member Lauren Jauregui sings: "Do you ever post your pics with no filter, 'Hashtag,' I woke up like this, too" in a clear reference to Beyoncé's song "Flawless". Editor Dawn Richard of The New York Times, wrote that "Them Girls Be Like" and "Boss" are both a "dutiful Beyoncé homage". The song "Brave, Honest, Beautiful" contains portions of Destiny's Child's "Bootylicious", co-written by Beyoncé. The group also praised the singer Mariah Carey on the track "Like Mariah", produced by J.R. Rotem with samples of the hook on Carey's 1995 single "Always Be My Baby".

=== Songs and lyrical content ===
The album opens with synth riffs introduced on the first track "Top Down". As well as finger snaps, it features tottering beats and a horn riff in the hook, which critics compared to Ariana Grande's "Problem". In the song's chorus the group sings, "Blaze it up we'll be cruisin', with the Top Down/Rev up the engine we'll be cruisin' watch it go down/Get in my truck and I'll be ridin' with my Top Down". Brennan Carley of Spin described it as "an unknowingly filthy anthem about riding in the car". During the hook, the phrase "electric city" is repeated several times. The song's hip hop-inspired production was also compared to "Fancy" by rapper Iggy Azalea featuring Charli XCX.

The second track "Boss" features trumpets, handclaps and heavy bass, creating a rhythmic, militaristic sound. The lyrics feature several cultural references. For example, the song's first verse refers to hip hop dance movement "Nae Nae": "Everyday is payday, swipe my card, then I do the nae nae." The second line clearly cites the rappers Kanye West and Ray J: "You're talking to a lady, I want a Kanye and not a Ray J." During the chorus, the group also praised female icons Michelle Obama and Oprah Winfrey. The song was compared to Destiny's Child's "Independent Women". Christina Garibaldi from MTV commented that the group "proudly sing about the fact they don't need a man as they "pledge allegiance to my independent girls in here". In an interview with Garibaldi, the group said "the whole point of this song is for girls who are our age to turn it on and feel confident and empowered because at this age being insecure is such a common occurrence. So we think when you turn that song on, you feel sexy and feel good about yourself." The next track, "Sledgehammer", is '80s-inspired synthpop. It features EDM beats, and heavy synths. Lyrically, the song uses "Sledgehammer" as a metaphor to express the physical effects of love.

"Boss" (2014)
A sound sample from "Boss", the song features a militaristic drumline that lyrically revolves around a theme of empowerment. During the chorus the group sings repeatedly the phrase "Michelle Obama, purse so heavy, getting Oprah dollars."

The fourth track "Worth It" features a guest appearance by Kid Ink. Written from the perspective of a woman telling a man that she is "Worth It", it implies a sexual connotation. However, like other songs on Reflection, "Worth It" could also be interpreted as a feminist song. Jeff Benjamin of Fuse expands this notion by writing the song can inspire "young girls to truly believe they're 'Worth It' and can own Wall Street or any other place on which they set their sights". Its instrumentation consists of horns sample, trance synths and a trap-inspired Roland TR-808 drum machine. Critics compared the song to "Talk Dirty" by Jason Derulo (also produced by Norwegian production team Stargate and musician Ori Kaplan) for a similar use of horns in its production.

The Dr. Luke-produced track, "This Is How We Roll", is a pop rock and electronic dance music fusion, with the chorus driven by guitar chords that drop off during each EDM-influenced hook. Brennan Carley of Spin noted that a similar sound can be found on "Scream & Shout" by Will.i.am and Britney Spears, mainly during the song's breakdown. The sixth track, "Everlasting Love", is influenced by '90s R&B; the group sings over piano notes and chattering percussion. The following track, "Like Mariah" samples Mariah Carey's "Always Be My Baby". It also features guest vocals by rapper Tyga. The group sings the chorus: "Your loving takes me higher/You set my heart on fire/When you touch my body/Got me singing like" with Carey's hook harmonizing around. Jason Lipshutz of Billboard commented that in the song, "Fifth Harmony admirably pulls off the sunny R&B vibe and falsetto runs of the pop icon they're honoring on the track".

"Them Girls Be Like" lyrics also feature cultural references, as noted by Lipshutz who wrote, "like 'Boss', the song oozes self-assuredness, this time swatting down female rivals instead of tongue-wagging males. The millennial-friendly lyrics are an absolute blast to swim through". During the song, the group sings: "We ain't like them girls that do too much/If you thirsty, you can't sit with us." The verse directly refers to the movie Mean Girls. In the bridge, Lauren Jauregui belts out: "Do you ever post your pics with no filter" in a clear reference to the movement #Nofilter. Time editor Jamieson Cox noted that with the song, the group "promote[s] a positive body image". Musically, the track is strongly influenced by Caribbean music.

The title track "Reflection" is a hip hop number, with a trap-influenced chorus, where Normani Kordei sings: "You'd be rich if looking good was your profession/Think I'm in love, 'cause you so sexy/Boy, I ain't talkin' about you, I'm talking to my own reflection." Meaghan Garvey of Pitchfork commented that the track is a "celebration of self-love without the somberness and pedantry that often comes with the topic, purring flirty coos to their own mirror images and breezily refuting the idea that women dress up for male approval." Critics described "Suga Mama" as a 2010s update of "No Scrubs" by R&B group TLC. Jamieson Cox of Time stated that in the track, "they're affectionate but unwilling to fund their deadbeat boyfriends' lavish lifestyles."

The eleventh track "We Know" is a stripped-down song in comparison to the rest of the album and begins with Kordei singing the first verse followed by Camila Cabello. Jauregui performs the pre-chorus accompanied by a simple piano melody, member Dinah Jane then sings the hook with the second verse sung by Ally Brooke. Garvey of Pitchfork praised the vocal's division in the song writing that it "serves as the album's most impressive showcase of each member's solo talents." The song contains an interpolation of DeBarge's "A Dream".

On the first bonus track included on the album's deluxe version, "Going Nowhere" is an EDM number. During the song, the group sings and a synth riff and synthesized handclaps are featured. "Body Rock" contains an interpolation from "(I've Had) The Time of My Life" performed by Bill Medley and Jennifer Warnes. The song has one of the faster tempos on the album. It features a synthesized melody and sirens. The deluxe edition concludes with "Brave, Honest, Beautiful" featuring Meghan Trainor. The chorus praises several female singers such as Beyonce, Shakira, Rihanna and Madonna. The lyrics are complemented by a moderate dance beat. Lyrically, it express a message of female empowerment and positive body image.

== Singles ==
"Boss" was released as the album's lead single on July 7, 2014, with the music video released a day later on Vevo. The song debuted at number 43 on the Billboard Hot 100, with first-week sales of 75,000 copies, number 37 on the Mainstream Top 40 chart and number 75 on the Canadian Hot 100. It reached the top 40 in countries such as Spain and the United Kingdom. It was certified platinum in the United States. The song's accompanying music video, choreographed and directed by Fatima Robinson, was released on the band's Vevo page showed the group performing with chairs, interacting at a photo shoot, and in an arm wrestling contest.

The album's second single, "Sledgehammer" was released on October 28, 2014. Its music video was released on November 25, 2014, on Vevo. "Sledgehammer" debuted on the Mainstream Top 40 chart at number 28, and peaked at number 21 on December 25, 2014, becoming the group's highest position on the chart, surpassing their first single "Miss Movin' On". The song went on to spend three non-consecutive weeks at its peak position. On December 4, 2014, the song debuted at number 93 on the Billboard Hot 100. It rose to a peak of number 40 on its fifth week on the chart with weekly sales of 85,000 copies, marking Fifth Harmony's best weekly sales as well as their highest-charting single and first top 40 entry. Along with "Boss", the song was certified platinum in the United States.

"Worth It", featuring Kid Ink, was sent to contemporary hit radio in the United States, as the album's third and last single on March 3, 2015. On the chart dated February 7, 2015, the song debuted on the Billboard Hot 100 at number 82. On July 28, 2015, it reached number 12 on its twenty-third week on the chart. It was the group's highest charting song at the time, but has since been surpassed by their 2016 single "Work from Home", which peaked at number four in May 2016. The song also debuted at number 37 on the Mainstream Top 40 chart. It has since reached a peak of number four, becoming their first top ten song on the chart. "Worth It" was the group's first song to debut on the Rhythmic chart. It was certified triple platinum, and became one of only twenty-two songs to be certified multi-platinum in 2015 in the United States. Elsewhere, the song peaked at number one in Israel, Lebanon and Mexico, number three in Scotland, as well as in the top 20 in Australia, Canada, Belgium, South Korea, Slovakia, Germany and France, becoming the group's biggest song worldwide.

=== Promotional singles ===
"Them Girls Be Like" was released as the only promotional single on August 24, 2014, along with the album's pre-order.

== Promotion ==
After releasing "Boss", the group released another song from the album, "We Know", during sessions for Idolator and Billboard. They performed several songs from the album before its release during Austin Mahone's Live on Tour in the summer of 2014. The new songs included "Reflection", "We Know" and "Going Nowhere". Fifth Harmony announced a headlining, 23-date tour, The Reflection Tour, commencing on February 27, 2015. Opening acts included Jacob Whitesides, Jasmine V and Mahogany Lox.

On the release of Reflection, MTV aired the Fifth Harmony Album Release Party Presented By Covergirl at New York's Webster Hall on February 6, 2015, where the group took the stage for a private performance, filmed by fans and turned into a music video, followed by an interview. Fifth Harmony appeared as guests on VH1's Big Morning Buzz Live for the entire week of February 16, 2015, doing interviews and performing on the show.

== Critical reception ==
Professional ratings
Aggregate scores
| Source | Rating |
|---|---|
| Metacritic | 78/100 |
Review scores
| Source | Rating |
| AllMusic | 4/5 stars |
| Billboard | 4/5 stars |
| The New York Times | 8/10 |
| Pitchfork | 7.2/10 |
| Rolling Stone | 3.5/5 stars |
| Spin | 7/10 |

Reflection received generally positive reviews from music critics. Writing for Time, Jamieson Cox, in a positive review, said the group is "agile, and have intuitive understanding of how their differences in vocal texture and range can impact their songs by introducing surprise and tension". He continued: "Reflection is certainly enjoyable on a purely musical level, but Fifth Harmony's perspective and positivity is often even more exciting." Matt Collar, of AllMusic, gave the album four out of five stars saying that it "is a slick production showcasing the group's multi voiced approach to contemporary R&B". He noted the diversity of musical genres, "from electronic-infused dance music to synthy, rhythmically bumptious hip-hop, to retro-'90s R&B," although adding that "it is very much a savvy pop product of the moment". Artistdirect's Rick Fiorino gave the album five out of five, saying that each song feels "massive" and has potential to be "blaring out of radios for years to come". He added that the group's "dynamic voices" fuse into "one focused pop roller coast (sic)". Fiorino ends his review saying that Reflection establishes the group as "21st century's pop music's premier powerhouse".

Brittany Spanos, of Rolling Stone, gave the album three and a half stars out of five, calling the lyrics "infectious" and the track "Like Mariah" a standout. Billboard's Jason Lipshutz gave the album four out of five stars saying that "most of the songs work," adding that the group shows "that they are capable of slick synth-pop, grungy hip-hop and fluttering R&B, the latter clearly indebted to the girl groups of the '90s". Lipshutz also compares the group's message to Rihanna, Nicki Minaj, and Katy Perry's, noting that "the back half of Reflection is basically a misandrist constitution, with the 5H ladies brushing off lazy dudes on 'Suga Mama', game-players on 'We Know' and the flight-before-fight bros on 'Going Nowhere'". Writing for Spin, Brennan Carley gave a rating of seven out of ten, calling the album "cohesive and modern," and "self-aware fun". He highlighted Meghan Trainor's work saying "her feel-good songwriting and female empowerment jams provide some of Reflection's highest peaks". Glenn Gamboa, of Newsday, gave the album a grade of B (the highest being an A+), highlighting how the track "Brave, Honest, Beautiful" could be an "anthem for the group". He also complemented the extended time the album took to make, saying this allowed the group "time to grow" and "plenty of resources". Gamboa finished his review by raving about the many pop culture icon references on the album, and how the group offers a "particular brand of multicultural girl power".

Writing for Idolator, Christina Lee gave the album three and a half stars out of five, saying that Fifth Harmony "nails every song with absolute precision, as if its members had known each other for far longer than just three years since The X Factor". She also predicted that the group is "bound to move on to the next round in this pop game" with a "No. 1 single, at the very least". Rebecca Mattina, from Andpop, gave the album three and a half stars out of five, saying that "the lyrics are fun, strong and full of swagger, and their vocals are always on-point. If they can really hone in (sic) on their sound, it won't be long before they're dominating the charts". She noted that "Boss" "might just be one of the best female empowerment songs since Destiny's Child's 'Independent Women'" and called the lyrics of "Brave Honest Beautiful" some of the group's "most powerful".

Billboard ranked "Sledgehammer" at number 57 on its list of 100 Greatest Girl Group Songs of All Time: Critics' Picks.

=== Year-end lists ===
| Critic/Publication | List | Rank | Ref. |
|---|---|---|---|
| AllMusic | Best Pop Albums of 2015 | No order | |
| Complex | Best Albums of 2015 | 39 | |
| Fact | The 50 Best Albums of 2015 | 34 | |
| Fuse | Top 20 Pop Albums of 2015 | 5 | |
| Rolling Stone | 20 Best Pop Albums of 2015 | 9 | |
| Spin | The 25 Best Pop Albums of 2015 | 12 | |
| Spin | Brennan Carley's 25 Best Albums of 2015 | 3 | |

== Commercial performance ==
The album debuted at number five on the Billboard 200 chart with 80,000 equivalent album units (with 62,000 of those coming from pure album sales), becoming their second release to debut in the top-ten since their first extended play, Better Together. Its steady performance within the top fifty after its release earned them a spot in the end of year charts at number 48. As of early 2016, the album has sold 155,000 copies in the United States. On December 12, 2017, the album was certified Platinum in the United States for combined sales and streaming-equivalent units of 1,000,000 units, after the Recording Industry Association of America introduced streams in their certification criteria.

Outside the United States, Reflection made an appearance in Canada, where it charted at number eight, becoming the group's first top ten entry there as well as in countries such as Brazil and New Zealand. In Europe, the album entered the top twenty in both the United Kingdom and Scotland, charting at 18 and 19 respectively. It also charted within the top thirty in five other countries. Reflection charted at number 16 in Australia, giving Fifth Harmony their second top twenty entry in Oceania after New Zealand. Elsewhere, the album made appearances within the top thirty in five other countries.

== Track listing ==
Reflection – Standard edition
| No. | Title | Writer(s) | Producer(s) | Length |
|---|---|---|---|---|
| 1. | "Top Down" | Linnéa Deb; Joy Deb; Anton Malmberg Hård af Segerstad; Maurice Simmonds | L. Deb; J. Deb; Segerstad | 3:40 |
| 2. | "Boss" | Eric Frederic; Joe Spargur; Daniel Kyriakides; Gamal Lewis; Jacob Hindlin; Taylor Parks | Frederic; Spargur; Daylight; Parks^{[b]} | 2:51 |
| 3. | "Sledgehammer" | Jonas Jeberg; Meghan Trainor; Sean Douglas | Jeberg; Harvey Mason, Jr.^{[b]} | 3:50 |
| 4. | "Worth It" (featuring Kid Ink) | Priscilla Renea; Mikkel Storleer Eriksen; Tor Erik Hermansen; Ori Kaplan | Stargate; Kaplan^{[a]} | 3:44 |
| 5. | "This is How We Roll" | Katherine Nestel; Tinashe Sibanda; Mike Molina; Lukasz Gottwald; Theron Thomas; Henry Russell Walter | Dr. Luke; Cirkut; Tommy Parker^{[b]} | 4:32 |
| 6. | "Everlasting Love" | Victoria Monét; Shane Stevens | Thomas Lee Brown; Travis Sayles | 3:04 |
| 7. | "Like Mariah" (featuring Tyga) | J.R. Rotem; Raja Kumari; Justin Drew Tranter; Michael Nguyen-Stevenson; Mariah Carey; Jermaine Dupri; Manuel Seal, Jr. | Rotem; Dupri | 3:28 |
| 8. | "Them Girls Be Like" | James Abrahart; Monét; Tinashe Sibanda; Emily Warren; Britt Burton | Sibanda; Monét^{[b]} | 2:42 |
| 9. | "Reflection" | Julian Bunetta; Hindlin; Monét | Monét^{[b]} | 3:08 |
| 10. | "Suga Mama" | Trainor; Chris Flict Aparri | Aparri | 3:39 |
| 11. | "We Know" | Monét; Kyle Stewart II; Etterlene DeBarge | Brown; Monét | 2:57 |
| Total length: | | | | 37:35 |

Reflection – Deluxe edition
| No. | Title | Writer(s) | Producer(s) | Length |
|---|---|---|---|---|
| 12. | "Going Nowhere" | Andre Merritt; Breana Marin; Hamilton; Aparri | Flict; Merritt^{[b]}; Marin^{[b]}; Hamilton^{[b]}; Parks^{[b]} | 3:34 |
| 13. | "Body Rock" | Harmony David Samuels; Thomas; John DeNicola; Donald Markowitz; Franke Previte | Samuels | 4:03 |
| 14. | "Brave Honest Beautiful" (featuring Meghan Trainor) | Trainor; Beyoncé Knowles; Kelendria Rowland; Rob Fusari; Falonte Moore; Stephanie Lynn Nicks | Flict; Trainor^{[b]}; Parks^{[b]} | 3:28 |
| Total length: | | | | 48:40 |

Reflection – Google Play bonus tracks
| No. | Title | Writer(s) | Producer(s) | Length |
|---|---|---|---|---|
| 15. | "I'm in Love with a Monster" (from Hotel Transylvania 2) | Samuels; Carmen Reece; Sarah Mancuso; Edgar Etienne; Ericka Coulter | Samuels | 3:31 |
| 16. | "Worth It (Dame Esta Noche)" (featuring Kid Ink) | Hamilton; Eriksen; Hermansen; Kaplan | Eriksen; Hermansen; Kaplan | 3:43 |
| Total length: | | | | 55:54 |

Reflection – Japan deluxe edition
| No. | Title | Writer(s) | Producer(s) | Length |
|---|---|---|---|---|
| 15. | "Don't Wanna Dance Alone" | Ally Brooke Hernandez; Camila Cabello; Dinah Jane Hansen; Lauren Jauregui; Normani Kordei; Bunetta; Merrit | Bunetta | 3:50 |
| 16. | "Miss Movin' On" | Jason Evigan; Lindy Robbins; Julia Michaels; Mitch Allan | Allan; Evigan | 3:14 |
| 17. | "Better Together" | Evigan; Savan Kotecha; Samuels; Rickard Göransson | Samuels | 3:14 |
| 18. | "Who Are You" | Hernandez; Cabello; Hansen; Jauregui; Kordei; Bunetta; PJ Bianco; Nasri Tony Atweh | Bunetta | 3:56 |
| 19. | "Leave My Heart Out of This" | Evigan; Tebey Ottoh; Marcus Lomax; Stefan Johnson; Jordan Johnson | Evigan; The Monsters & Strangerz | 3:50 |
| 20. | "Me & My Girls" | Hernandez; Cabello; Hansen; Jauregui; Kordei; Bunetta; Bianco; Beau Alexandrè Dozier; John Ryan | Bunetta; Bianco; Dozier; Ilya Salmanzadeh | 3:24 |
| 21. | "I'm in Love with a Monster" | Samuels; Reece; Mancuso; Etienne; Coulter | | 3:31 |
| 22. | "Miss Movin' On" (Papercha$er Remix) | Allan; Evigan; Robbins; Michaels | Evigan; Allan; Papercha$er ^{[c]} | 4:07 |
| Total length: | | | | 77:46 |

Notes

- ^{^[a]} signifies a co-producer.
- ^{^[b]} signifies a vocal producer.
- ^{^[c]} signifies a remix producer.

Sample credits

- "Like Mariah" contains elements of the composition "Always Be My Baby", written by Mariah Carey, Jermaine Dupri and Manuel Seal, Jr., performed by Mariah Carey.
- "We Know" contains a portion of the composition "A Dream", written by Bunny DeBarge, performed by DeBarge.
- "Body Rock" contains an interpolation from "(I've Had) The Time of My Life", written by John DeNicola, Donald Markowitz and Franke Previte, performed by Bill Medley and Jennifer Warnes.
- "Brave Honest Beautiful" contains a portion of the composition "Bootylicious", written by Rob Fusari, Beyoncé Knowles, Kelendria Rowland, Falonte Moore and Stevie Nicks, performed by Destiny's Child

== Personnel ==
Credits for Reflection adapted from AllMusic.

Managerial

- Danny D. – executive producer
- Tim Blacksmith – executive producer
- Dalia Glickman – A&R
- Michael Klein – A&R
- Jermaine Pegues – A&R
- Joey Arbagey – A&R

Vocals

- Ally Brooke — lead vocals (except "Them Girls Be Like"), background vocals
- Normani Kordei — lead vocals, background vocals
- Dinah Jane — lead vocals (except "Boss" and "Sledgehammer"), background vocals
- Lauren Jauregui — lead vocals (except "Worth It"), background vocals
- Camila Cabello — lead vocals, background vocals
- Kid Ink – featured artist
- Tyga – featured artist
- Meghan Trainor – featured artist, background vocals

Visuals and imagery

- Fuko Chubachi – art direction, design
- JP Robinson – art direction, creative director
- Fatima Robinson – art direction, creative director
- Ben Cope – photography

Production

- Nate Alford – engineer
- Mike Anderson – engineer
- Henrique Andrade – assistant
- Tommy Brown – production
- Julian Bunetta – mixing, programming, engineer
- Cirkut – production, programming
- Maddox Chhim – assistant
- Daylight – engineer, production, programming
- The Family – production
- Rachael Findlen – assistant
- Chris "Flict" Aparri – production
- Serban Ghenea – mixing
- Clint Gibbs – engineer
- Bradford H. Smith – assistant
- John Hanes – mixing
- Andrew Hey – engineer
- Jean-Marie Horvat – mixing
- Jonas Jeberg – engineer
- Jonas Jeberg – production, vocal production
- Jaycen Joshua – mixing
- Samuel Kalandjian – mixing, engineer
- Ori Kaplan – production
- Ryan Kaul – assistant
- Daniel Kyriakides – engineer
- Matt Larson – assistant
- Aldo Lehman – engineer
- Joe London – engineer, production, programming
- Dr. Luke – production, programming
- Harvey Mason, Jr. – vocal production
- Tim McClain – assistant
- Victoria Monét – vocal production
- Cameron Montgomery – assistant
- Mikkel S. Eriksen – engineer
- Stargate – production
- Tommy Parker – vocal production
- Taylor Parks – vocal production
- T-Collar – production, engineer
- J.R. Rotem – production
- Ricky Reed – engineer, production, programming
- Benjamin Rice – engineer
- Irene Richter – production coordination
- Deon Sanders – production
- Travis Sayles – production
- Christopher Trujillo – engineer
- Miles Walker – engineer
- Brandon Wood – assistant
- Daniel Zaidenstadt – engineer

Musicians

- Julian Bunetta – musician
- Tor Erik Hermansen – instrumentation
- Cirkut – instrumentation
- Dr. Luke – instrumentation
- Mikkel S. Eriksen – instrumentation
- Jonas Jeberg – instrumentation
- Darhyl "DJ" Camper, Jr. – keyboards
- Kyle Townsend – piano
- Ori Kaplan – saxophone
- Daniel Kyriakides – horn

== Charts ==
=== Weekly charts ===
| Chart (2015–2016) | Peak position |
|---|---|
| Australian Albums (ARIA) | 16 |
| Belgian Albums (Ultratop Flanders) | 18 |
| Belgian Albums (Ultratop Wallonia) | 124 |
| Brazilian Albums (ABPD) | 7 |
| Canadian Albums (Billboard) | 8 |
| Dutch Albums (Album Top 100) | 28 |
| Finnish Albums (Suomen virallinen lista) | 45 |
| French Albums (SNEP) | 111 |
| Irish Albums (IRMA) | 23 |
| Japanese Albums (Oricon) | 85 |
| Mexican Albums (AMPROFON) | 29 |
| New Zealand Albums (RMNZ) | 8 |
| Norwegian Albums (VG-lista) | 24 |
| Portuguese Albums (AFP) | 30 |
| Scottish Albums (Official Charts) | 19 |
| Spanish Albums (Promusicae) | 9 |
| Swedish Albums (Sverigetopplistan) | 26 |
| Swiss Albums (Schweizer Hitparade) | 69 |
| UK Albums (Official Charts) | 18 |
| UK Album Downloads (Official Charts) | 15 |
| US Billboard 200 | 5 |

=== Year-end charts ===
| Chart (2015) | Position |
|---|---|
| Swedish Albums (Sverigetopplistan) | 58 |
| US Billboard 200 | 48 |

== Certifications ==
| Region | Certification | Certified units/sales |
|---|---|---|
| Brazil (Pro-Música Brasil) | Gold | 20,000^{*} |
| Canada (Music Canada) | Gold | 40,000^{‡} |
| Denmark (IFPI Danmark) | Gold | 10,000^{‡} |
| Mexico (AMPROFON) | Platinum | 60,000^{‡} |
| New Zealand (RMNZ) | Platinum | 15,000^{‡} |
| Poland (ZPAV) | Gold | 10,000^{‡} |
| United Kingdom (BPI) | Silver | 60,000^{‡} |
| United States (RIAA) | Platinum | 1,000,000^{‡} |
^{*} Sales figures based on certification alone.^{‡} Sales+streaming figures based on certification alone.

== Release history ==
List of release dates, showing region, release format, and label
| Region | Date | Format | Label | Edition | Ref. |
|---|---|---|---|---|---|
| Netherlands | January 30, 2015 | CD; digital download; LP | Epic; Syco; Sony | Standard; deluxe | |
| Canada | February 3, 2015 | CD; digital download; LP | Epic; Syco; Sony | Standard; deluxe | |
| United States | February 3, 2015 | CD; digital download; LP | Epic; Syco; Sony | Standard; deluxe | |
| United Kingdom | July 10, 2015 | CD; digital download; LP | Epic; Syco; Sony | Standard; deluxe | |
| Japan | January 27, 2016 | CD; digital download | Epic | Deluxe | |
