= Sugerman =

Sugerman is a surname. Notable people with the surname include:

- Andrew Sugerman, American film producer
- Bernard Sugerman (1904–1976), Australian barrister, legal scholar, and judge
- Danny Sugerman (1954–2005), manager of the Los Angeles-based rock band the Doors

== See also ==
- Sugarman, surname
