= Sugar Baby =

A sugar baby is a person supported (typically financially and materially) by an older companion.

Sugar Baby or Sugar Babies may refer to:

== Music ==
- Sugarbaby (EP), 2008 EP by Morningwood
- "Sugar Baby" (song), a 2001 song by Bob Dylan
- "Sugar Baby", a song by Megan Thee Stallion from the 2020 album Good News

== Stage, film and television ==
- Sugar Babies (musical), a 1979 Broadway musical
- Sugarbaby (film), aka Zuckerbaby, by Percy Adlon
- The Sugar Babies, a 2007 documentary film
- Youtopia (film), a 2018 Italian film also known as Sugar Baby
- Sugar Baby (TV series), a 2025 Indonesian television series
- Suga BayBee, an alias of Canadian actress Sugar Lyn Beard (born 1981)

== Other uses ==
- Sugar Babies (candy), caramel sweets

== See also ==
- Sugar Daddy (disambiguation)
- Sugar Man (disambiguation)
- Sugar Mama (disambiguation)
- Sugababes, English musical group
