= Sugarman =

Sugarman is a surname. Notable people with the surname include:

- Burt Sugarman, American television producer
- George Sugarman, American artist
- Jeremy Sugarman, American bioethicist
- Jule Sugarman, American public administrator
- Morris Henry Sugarman, American architect
- Richard Sugarman, American professor of religion, political advisor to Bernie Sanders
- Sara Sugarman, Welsh actress and film director
- Stephen Sugarman, American law professor
- Tracy Sugarman, American graphic designer

== Other uses ==
- Sugarman syndrome, a common name for a human disease
- Sugarman: The Best of Rodriguez, a compilation album by Rodriguez (musician)
- Two Yoo Project - Sugarman, a South Korean TV series
- Sugarman Gang, an English burglary ring which operated during the early 1900s
- The Sugarman 3, an American retro-funk band formed by Neal Sugarman, Adam Scone, and Rudy Albin

== See also ==
- Sugar Man (disambiguation)
- Sugerman, surname
