= Sugar Man =

Sugar Man or The Sugar Man may refer to:

== Arts and entertainment ==
- Sugar Man (Marvel Comics), a villain appearing in the Marvel comic universe since 1995
- SMS Sugar Man, a 2008 film by Aryan Kaganof
- Two Yoo Project - Sugar Man, a 2015 South Korean TV series

=== Music ===
- Stanley Turrentine, a jazz saxophonist also known as 'The Sugar Man'
  - The Sugar Man, a 1975 album by the above artist
- Cootie Stark, a guitarist and singer-songwriter also known as 'Sugar Man'
  - Sugar Man, a 1999 album by the above artist
- "Sugar Man" (song), a 1969 song by US folk musician Rodriguez from the album Cold Fact and remixed in 2014 by Yolanda Be Cool and DCUP
- Sugarman: The Best of Rodriguez, a 2005 compilation album by Rodriguez
- Sugar Man, a 1999 EP by Silent Poets
- "Sugar Man", a 1968 song by Roy Orbison, cf. Roy Orbison discography
- "Sugar Man", a song by The Reverend Peyton's Big Damn Band
- "Sugar Man", a 1969 song by Bill Kenwright
- "Sugar Man", a 1991 song from the album Dollars and Sex by The Escape Club
- "Sugar Man", a 1972 song from the album Jesus Was a Capricorn by Kris Kristofferson
- "Sugar Man", a 2006 song from the single "Last Request" by Paolo Nutini
- "Sugar Man (9 To 5)", a 1969 song from the album Commitment by Bobby Darin
- "Sugar Man's Blues", a 2011 song from the album There Will Be Peace in the Valley... When We Get the Keys to the Mansion on the Hill by Alabama 3
- "Vendetta: The Sugar Man", a 2008 song from the album The John Baker Tapes – Volume One: BBC Radiophonics by John Baker

== See also ==
- Searching for Sugar Man, a 2012 documentary film about Rodriguez
- Sugarman, a surname
- Zuckerman, a surname from German, meaning sugarman
- Sugar Daddy (disambiguation)
- Sugar Baby (disambiguation)
- Sugar Mama (disambiguation)
