= Sledgehammer (Fifth Harmony song) =

2014 single by Fifth Harmony

Single by Fifth Harmony

from the album Reflection
- A-side: "Boss"
- Released: October 28, 2014
- Recorded: 2014
- Studio: Windmark Recording (Santa Monica, California)
- Genre: Synth-pop; EDM
- Length: 3:52
- Label: Epic; Syco
- Songwriters: Jonas Jeberg; Meghan Trainor; Sean Douglas
- Producers: Jeberg; Harvey Mason Jr.

Fifth Harmony singles chronology
"Boss" (2014)	"Sledgehammer" (2014)	"Worth It" (2015)

Music video
- "Fifth Harmony - Sledgehammer (Official Video)" on YouTube

"Sledgehammer" is a song recorded by American girl group Fifth Harmony for their first full-length studio album, Reflection (2015). The song was released on October 28, 2014 by Epic Records and Syco Music as the record's second single. It was written by Jonas Jeberg, Meghan Trainor and Sean Douglas, and produced by Jeberg and Harvey Mason Jr. Musically, "Sledgehammer" is a synthpop song with influences of electronic dance music, new wave and 1980s pop music. Its lyrics utilize a sledgehammer metaphor to describe the effects of being infatuated.

Music critics generally gave positive reviews of the song, praising its production. Commercially, "Sledgehammer" peaked at number 40 on the Billboard Hot 100, making it Fifth Harmony's first top 40 entry in the United States. It was eventually certified Platinum by the Recording Industry Association of America (RIAA) for sales of over one million copies. The song also reached the top 40 in New Zealand, The Czech Republic and Slovakia.

An accompanying music video for the track was choreographed and directed by Fatima Robinson. It features silhouette visuals and the members swinging on a scaffold, among other scenes. Critics noted the video's simple aesthetics as a growth in the group's visuals. Fifth Harmony performed the song live at the 2014 MTV Europe Music Awards, Good Morning America, The Talk, Today Show and The Ellen DeGeneres Show.

== Background and composition ==
"Sledgehammer"
A 23-second sample from the chorus of "Sledgehammer", which incorporates influences of 1980's dance music and new wave.

During a live stream on October 23, 2014, Fifth Harmony announced that "Sledgehammer" would be serviced as the second single from their debut studio album, Reflection (2015). They described it as a transition from their precedent single "Boss" (2014). The track was written by Jonas Jeberg, Meghan Trainor, and Sean Douglas, while production was handled by Jeberg and Harvey Mason Jr. The group's vocals were produced and recorded by Heberg, Mason Jr. and Andrew Hey at Windmark Recording in Santa Monica, California. In an interview with Official Charts Company, Trainor revealed that "Sledgehammer" was one of the songs she wrote for her solo debut album – later called Title (2015) – however, Epic Records decided to release "All About That Bass" as a lead single, so Trainor offered the song to Fifth Harmony.

"Sledgehammer" is a heavy synthpop production backed by an electronic dance music (EDM) beat, taking influence from new wave and 1980s music. Lyrically, the song expresses the physical sensations of being infatuated, comparing it to a sledgehammer motif: "If you take my pulse right now, it would feel just like a sledgehammer." Jessica Hyndman of MTV suggested that the song is about a kind of love that just "can't be contained". According to music sheet published at Musicnotes.com by BMG Rights Management, "Sledgehammer" is written in the key of G major and is set in a 4/4 common time at 100 bpm with an upbeat pop melody. The quintet's vocals span from G_{3} to F_{5} and follow a chord progression of C–G–D–C–E_{m}–D.

== Reception ==
=== Critical ===
"Sledgehammer" received generally positive reviews from music critics. Jason Lipshutz of Billboard praised the song's "EDM-meets-new-wave beat" and its "immediate hook", believing that "Sledgehammer" is "the best pop track about the physical effects of lovesickness since Demi Lovato's "Heart Attack" (2013)". It was tied as the best ranked song of the week, sharing the honor with "Don't It" (2014) by country singer Billy Currington. Mike Wass of Idolator called it "a sugary sweet synth-pop anthem with serious radio appeal". Jessica Hyndman from MTV noted that "'Sledgehammer' takes on a fun pop vibe" that lacked in the group's previous single, "Boss". A reviewer from Teen Vogue deemed the track as "catchy", while Carolyn Menyes from Music Times gave "Sledgehammer" a mixed review. She praised the group's performance, commending that their distinctive voices sound "perfectly", but expressed that the single fell "completely into average territory."

In a 2017 article published on Idolator, Mike Neid covered the song in the website's "Should Have Been Bigger" feature, stating that the track was one of the group's most "underrated" songs. Neid further commented on how their visuals were not as "sexy" as the music video for their 2016 single "Work from Home", but served as a "joyful and chic" reminder of their "youthful beginnings." Billboard ranked the song at number 57 on their 100 Greatest Girl Group Songs of All Time list. Lipshutz stated that though one of the lines is "more than a bit confusing", the group manage to "sell their tale of unsaid infatuation with dedicated melismas and gooey production".

In 2017, Billboard ranked "Sledgehammer" at number 57 on its list of 100 Greatest Girl Group Songs of All Time: Critics' Picks.

=== Commercial performance ===
Upon its release, "Sledgehammer" debuted on Billboard's Mainstream Top 40 chart at number 28. It peaked at number 21 in December 2014, becoming their highest position–surpassing their debut single "Miss Movin' On" (2013) at the time. The song went on to spend three non-consecutive weeks at its peak position. For the week dated December 4, 2014, "Sledgehammer" debuted at number 93 on the Billboard Hot 100. It eventually rose to a peak of 40 in its fifth week on the chart, with sales of 85,000–aided by a price reduction on digital download services, which reported a 277 percent spike in sales. This marked Fifth Harmony's best week sales, as well as their highest-charting single and first top 40 hit; It has since been surpassed by "Worth It" (2015) and "Work from Home" (2016). On June 26, 2015, "Sledgehammer" was certified Platinum by the Recording Industry Association of America (RIAA) in the United States for sales of one million units. It also received a Gold certification in both Canada.

== Music video ==
An accompanying music video for "Sledgehammer" was uploaded onto Fifth Harmony's official Vevo account on November 25, 2014. It was directed and choreographed by Fatima Robinson, who also directed the music video for "Boss". Scenes in the visual include a swing set, a unicorn sculpture, and a silhouetted man swinging a sledgehammer while the group is dressed in colorful dresses and silky hair. MTV released an exclusive behind-the-scenes video of "Sledgehammer" on November 21, 2014.

In the music video, the members of Fifth Harmony portray themselves as silhouettes dancing in a background of blue and white shades.

The video begins with the members of Fifth Harmony standing in a background of white and blue shades, where Camila Cabello takes her pulse, the band starts dancing and the screen goes dark. The group is subsequently standing in a pyramid stair, with Cabello moving her hands in rhythm of the song before switching back to the prior scene. Following this, the screen goes dark several times, switching from a shot of a shirtless man moving a sledgehammer and the members in the white and blue shade background. The next scene turns into color, revealing the faces of the group for the first time, with each pounding their heart with their hands as the lyric "If you could take my pulse right now, it would feel like a sledgehammer" is sung. Choreographed dance moves such as the members throwing their fists in the air and the shot between the shirtless man moving the sledgehammer are alternated. Another seen has the girls on a swing set/scaffolding area barefoot and wearing different dresses. Normani is in a light green dress, Ally Brooke is in a red dress, Camila is in an orange dress, Dinah Jane is in a purple dress, and Lauren Jauregui is in a blue dress.

The screen then shows blue and orange colors, in a special effect mimicking lights moving around them. Final scenes shows the members individually singing, all wearing a different dress from the first shot. The video continues with repeating several scenes with the negative special effects becoming more present. In a different shot, the silhouette one of the group is seen with a fan blowing air towards her, waving her hair and dress simultaneously. The video rewinds the moment the shirtless man breaks pieces of brick apart to make it seem as if though the pieces are reforming, similar to when one is going through heartbreak. Writing for Billboard, Lipshutz said the video's monochromatic setting allows the group to "demonstrate their maturity". He also states that the video is "more of a relax fest" and called the "giddiness radiation" of the girls "pretty infectious". As of July 2020, the video has surpassed over 170 million views.

== Live performances ==
On November 9, 2014, Fifth Harmony performed "Sledgehammer" for the first time at the pre-show of the 2014 MTV Europe Music Awards. The following week, the group performed the song on Good Morning America and performed an acoustic version on Access Hollywood Live. Nearly a month later, the group performed a stripped down jazz version on VH1's Big Morning Buzz Live and closed the year by performing the song on "Pitbull's New Year's Revolution" that aired on Fox. Upon the release of Reflection, the group performed the song on The Today Show on February 3, 2015 and on The Talk. Several weeks later, the group presented the song on Sunrise while promoting the album in Australia and on The Ellen DeGeneres Show. Sledgehammer also appeared on the set list for Fifth Harmony's performances at the 2015 New York, New York; Atlanta, Georgia; Chicago, Illinois; and Sunrise, Florida Jingle Ball concerts. It was also included on the setlist for the group's headlined international tours, the Reflection Tour and the 7/27 Tour.

== Credits and personnel ==
Credits adapted from Reflection's liner notes.

Recording and management

- Recorded at Windmark Recording Studios (Santa Monica)
- Mixed at Larrabee Sound Studios (North Hollywood)
- Mastered at Big Noize Studios (Los Angeles, California)
- Published by BMG Platinum Songs BMI – All rights administered by BMG Rights Management (US) / LLC Year Of The Dog Music (ASCAP), Warner-Tamerlane Publishing Corp. (BMI) and Eastman Point Publishing (BMI).

Personnel

- Fifth Harmony – lead vocals, background vocals
- Jonas Jeberg – songwriting, production, vocal production, all instruments, engineering
- Meghan Trainor – songwriting, additional background vocals
- Sean Douglas – songwriting
- Harvey Mason Jr. – vocal production
- Andrew Hey – engineering
- Jaycen Joshua – mixing
- Ryan Kaul – mixing assistant
- Maddox Chhim – mixing assistant

== Charts ==
Chart (2014–16)	Peak position
Australia (ARIA)	88
Belgium (Ultratip Bubbling Under Flanders)	49
Belgium (Ultratip Bubbling Under Wallonia)	21
Canada Hot 100 (Billboard)	63
Canada CHR/Top 40 (Billboard)	34
Czech Republic Singles Digital (ČNS IFPI)	27
Ireland (IRMA)	83
New Zealand (Recorded Music NZ)	36
Scottish Singles Sales (Official Charts)	77
Slovakia Singles Digital (ČNS IFPI)	30
Sweden (Sverigetopplistan)	75
UK Singles (OCC)	112
US Billboard Hot 100	40
US Adult Pop Airplay (Billboard)	36
US Pop Airplay (Billboard)	21

== Certifications ==
Region	Certification	Certified units/sales
Canada (Music Canada)	Gold	40,000^{*}
Sweden (GLF)	Gold	20,000^{‡}
New Zealand (RMNZ)	Gold	7,500^{*}
United States (RIAA)	Platinum	1,000,000^{‡}
^{*} Sales figures based on certification alone.^{‡} Sales+streaming figures based on certification alone.

== Release history ==
Country	Date	Format	Label
United States	October 28, 2014	Digital download	Epic; Syco
United Kingdom	December 7, 2014	Digital download	Syco
