= Boss (Fifth Harmony song) =

Single by Fifth Harmony

from the album Reflection
- Released: July 7, 2014
- Studio: The Venice Studio (Venice, California); The Record Plant (Los Angeles)
- Genre: Dance-pop; hip hop; R&B
- Length: 2:51
- Label: Epic; Syco
- Songwriters: Eric Frederic; Joe Spargur; Daniel Kyriakides; Gamal Lewis; Jacob Kasher Hindlin; Taylor Parks
- Producers: Frederic; Spargur; Kyriakides

Fifth Harmony singles chronology
| "Miss Movin' On" (2013) | "Boss" (2014) | "Sledgehammer" (2014) |

Music video
- "Boss" on YouTube

"Boss" (stylized as "BO$$") is a song recorded by American girl group Fifth Harmony, released as the lead single from the group's debut studio album, Reflection (2015). Serviced to contemporary hit radio on August 19, 2014, the song was written by Eric Frederic, Joe Spargur, Daniel Kyriakides, Gamal Lewis, Jacob Kasher Hindlin and Taylor Parks, and was produced by Frederic, Spargur and Daylight. Musically, "Boss" is a dance-pop song with additional instrumentation including trumpets, handclaps, horns and heavy bass that create a rhythmic militaristic sound. Lyrically, the song focuses on themes of feminism, female empowerment, confidence and reversed gender roles. Critics drew comparisons to the works of previous girl groups such as Destiny's Child.

"Boss" was well received by contemporary music critics, who praised the song's lyrical themes and production. "Boss" debuted and peaked at number 43 on the Billboard Hot 100, staying in the charts for a total of fifteen weeks, outperforming "Miss Movin' On", their first single after forming as a quintet on The X Factor. Among national airplay charts, the track peaked at number 37 on the Mainstream Top 40, even though "Boss" was censored from mainstream radios after many felt the song was sending a political message to listeners, according to Frederic, one of the producers of the track. Outside of the United States, the song peaked at number 75 on the Canadian Hot 100 and reached the top 40 in countries such as Spain and the United Kingdom. The song was certified platinum by the Recording Industry Association of America.

An accompanying music video for the song, choreographed and directed by Fatima Robinson, was released on the band's Vevo page that showed the group performing with chairs and interacting at a photo shoot and an arm wrestling contest. The group performed the single for the first time at the Toyota Concert Series on Today followed by a pre-show red-carpet performance at the 2014 MTV Video Music Awards. The track was subsequently included in the Reflection Tour, the 7/27 Tour and the PSA Tour.

== Background and release ==
Initially, the track was teased through Fifth Harmony's social media accounts, in a short clip on July 4 but a snippet was played near the end of their performance at the Kiss 108 FM Concert in Boston on May 30, 2014. It was officially released exclusively through MTV shortly after being teased. Speaking to MTV, the group stated that the whole idea behind the track was for girls who share the same age as the group to "turn" the song on and "feel confident and empowered" because insecurity is a "common occurrence" in this age. When you turn the song on, you "feel sexy" and "good about yourself."

After performing the single live for the first time in its entirety on the Today Show, the group said that they felt "so many people are competitive with one another" and they want to "bring everyone together" and in turn, "have people encourage one another." "Boss" received promotion through a self-esteem campaign partnership with Do Something titled #ImABoss. The purpose of this was to encourage young people to make signs for their friends that included a compliment or a unique trait about them. It started two days after the single's release and lasted for two months on September 9.

== Composition ==
"Boss" (2014)
A sound sample from "Boss", the song features a militaristic drumline that lyrically revolves around a theme of empowerment. During the chorus the group sings repeatedly the phrase "Michelle Obama, purse so heavy, getting Oprah dollars."

"Boss" is a dance-pop, hip hop and R&B song. It features trumpets, handclaps and heavy bass, creating a rhythmic militaristic sound. The song features Normani rapping on the verses. The lyrics features several cultural references. For example, the first verse refers to the hip hop dance move called the Nae Nae: "Everyday is payday, swipe my card, then I do the nae nae." While the second line clearly cites the rappers Kanye West and Ray J: "You're talking to a lady, I want a Kanye and not a Ray J." During the chorus, the group also praised female icons Michelle Obama and Oprah Winfrey, The song received comparisons to Destiny's Child's "Independent Women"; Christina Garibaldi from MTV commented that the group "proudly sing about the fact they don't need a man as they "pledge allegiance to my independent girls in here." In an interview with Garibaldi, the group stated that "the whole point of this song is for girls who are our age to turn it on and feel confident and empowered because at this age being insecure is such a common occurrence. So we think when you turn that song on, you feel sexy and feel good about yourself."

== Reception ==
=== Critical responses ===
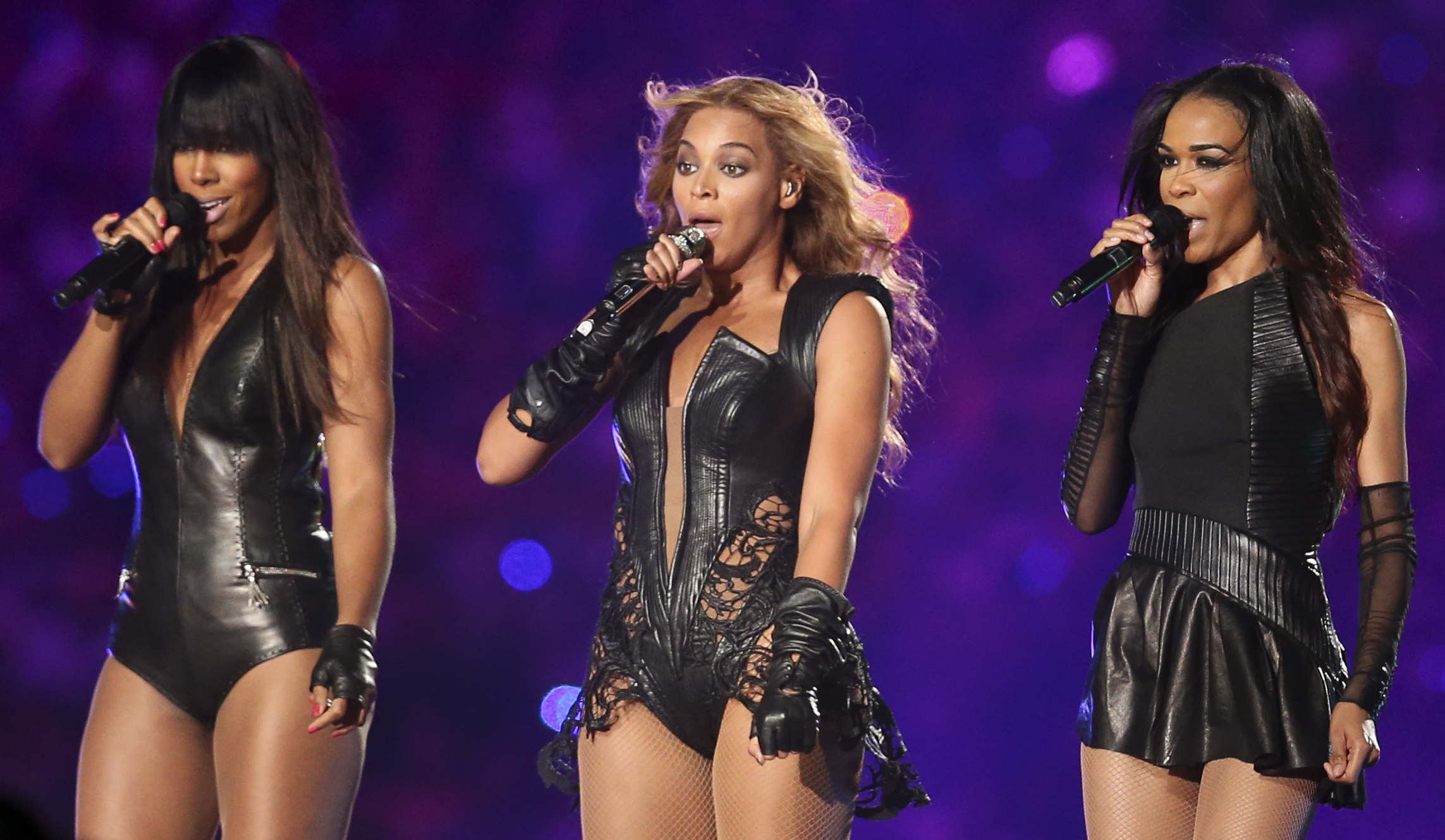
Thematically, critics compared "Boss" to the works of Destiny's Child.

"Boss" has received positive reviews from critics. In a track-by-track review of the group's debut studio album, Reflection, Jason Lipshutz of Billboard describing the song as "brimming with female assertiveness." He adds that while the pop culture references "don't stand the test of time", the group's brand of "confidence", surely will. Gerrick D. Kennedy of the Los Angeles Times called "Boss" a stand out track from Reflection. Praising the group's new mature image, James Dinh of SheKnows said that "Fifth Harmony ready to show off their grown and sexy side" or their record company is at least attempting to demonstrate that. She continues by saying that similar to the "many girl groups" that came before them, the "product of 2012's The X Factor" is back a new single with an "image that is just a bit more feisty" than last year's extended play, Better Together.

Carolyn Menyes of Music Times gave a positive review saying while being "filled with urban music influences, 'Boss' shows a "mature" to the group, as "tribal beats" swoop underneath the track's "female-powered flare". She notes the "keen pop culture references which mentions celebrities and products such as Kanye West, Kim Kardashian and Beats by Dre. In a downside, Menyes said "Boss" could very "well become dated in future years" but at the moment, it is the kind of "ballsy bossy music pop needs". In a positive review, Christina Lee of Idolator, stated that "Boss" proved to be a "working girl anthem" like its predecessors of "Bills, Bills, Bills," Kelis' "Bossy" and TLC's "No Scrubs," though for an age of filming #NaeNae Vines at the White House. Lee commended the group's mentor Simon Cowell, saying he "was onto something" adding that tracks like the "savvy 'Boss'", means that "girl groups were bound to come back in style".

=== Commercial performance ===
For the marked date of July 17, 2014, "Boss" debuted at number 43 on the Billboard Hot 100 chart with first-week sales of 75,000, becoming the group's best week sales as well as highest-charting song at that time. The song charted for fifteen weeks and earned the group their first top 40 entry at the time on the Mainstream Top 40 peaking at number 37. "Boss" was certified Platinum in the United States for selling combined sales and track-equivalent streams units of one million.

Elsewhere, the song charted at number 12 in Scotland, while peaking right outside the top 20 in the United Kingdom at number 21. The song made appearances in the top 40 in countries such as Czech Republic, Spain and Slovakia.

The producer of the song, Ricky Reed, stated "Boss" was censored from some radios around the country due to references to First Lady Michelle Obama.

== Music video ==
=== Background and reception ===
The official music video was streamed online on MTV's website on July 7, 2014 and it was released on Fifth Harmony's official Vevo channel on July 8, 2014. Scenes in the video include chair choreography, a catwalk-strutting photo shoot and an arm wrestling contest. The music video was directed and choreographed by Fatima Robinson. A behind-the-scenes video was released on July 11, 2014. The video earned the group their second Vevo certification, for reaching over 100 million views on October 7, 2015.

Critics were positively receptive to the video with several critics noting the group's mature image from their previous videos. One of them was Jason Lipshutz of Billboard who noted the mature tone in the video and said the group "prove that they mean business." He also called the choreography "on point" and said that the name checks "appear (sic) to be reaching a new level as a collective." Christina Lee of Idolator compared the director's work to that of the Backstreet Boys' "As Long As You Love Me", which features "flirting, flashing lights" and a "chair routine."

=== Synopsis ===
The members of Fifth Harmony stand united wearing white-colored outfits.

The video begins with the members of Fifth Harmony snapping their fingers to the rhythm of the song. Moments later, phrases such as "Think like a boss" and "Dreams don't work unless you do" as well as "Find Yourself. And be that." flash momentarily in the video. The group are now dressed in all black-colored outfits, sporting a more revealing persona. The word 'Boss' appears abruptly, in Hollywood-inspired lights. The members then perform several choreographed dances, before the words Boss, with the 's' stylized with a dollar symbol, appear. The scene switches to a model runway, where the girls are now wearing different outfits, with photographers taking pictures as each girl poses for their picture. They refer themselves to a "Boss", showing their self-confidence and feminist values.

The setting switches to the scene in the beginning in the video, except all the girls are now sitting in metallic chairs, dancing as the word "common sense" appears on the screen. This is reference to the lyric, "That's me, I'm confident Don't want yo compliments Use common sense". The girls then unanimously tell their beloved to keep quiet and listen to them. The girls perform more choreographed dance routines, including moving their feet and tilting their heads backwards at the same time. Then, as the girls tell their lover to give them respect, they all kick their chairs back in frustration.

The girls are now challenging some men to an arm-wrestling challenge. Normani beats one of her male opponents effortlessly. In a different scene, the girls are seen placing their hand next to their heart, pledging allegiance to a white flag with the words "Bo$$ Fifth Harmony" written in gold letters. They all salute the flag, before the scene shifts to Lauren using a Sony camera to take a picture at what is unknown to the viewer. Then, each girl approaches the end of the runway, where lights flash, as each girl is shown. The girls then move their feet in synchronized motion, where the words "Let me" "hear you" "say" appear chronologically in three different times.

As the girls repeatedly say the words "yeah", the scene moves back to the arm-wrestling challenge, except Dinah is now facing a male opponent. She distracts him by removing his cap and placing it on her head and while he is distracted, manages to beat him. Ally then faces her male opponent, who removes his shirt and shows off his physical fitness. The setting shifts to one where all the girls are wearing long old-fashioned dresses, all sitting in a vintage sofa, exuding confidence. Lights flash constantly before the scene changes back to the arm-wrestling challenge, where Ally beats her opponent. Camila and Lauren also challenge a male opponent, and win as well. The girls are now feeling optimistic and empowered, with each girl holding letters that spell out the word "Confident". The scene ends with each girl back in the earlier setting, united and embracing their self-beauty. As of July 14, 2020, the video was nearing 250 million views, having 249.4 million views at the time.

== Live performances ==
Fifth Harmony performed the song for the first time on The Today Show in New York City on the Rockefeller Plaza. followed by a performance at the 2014 MTV Video Music Awards on the red carpet and at the 2014 MTV Europe Music Awards's pre-show on November 9, 2014. The group also performed at the Radio Row press event, before the American Music Awards, singing "Boss" along with "Miss Movin' On" and "Sledgehammer". The group performed "Boss" on BET's 106 and Park. It was performed again on The X Factor 11th season on December 7, 2014. The girls performed it on Pitbull's New Year's Revolution that aired on Fox on December 31, 2014.

"Boss" is on the setlist for Fifth Harmony's performances at the 2015 New York, New York; Atlanta, Georgia; Chicago, Illinois; and Sunrise, Florida Jingle Ball concerts. They also performed the song during the 2016 Jingle Ball Tour concerts. It also part of the setlist used for The Reflection Tour.

== Track listing ==
- Digital download
1. "Boss" – 2:51
- UK Digital single
1. "Boss" – 2:51
2. "Sledgehammer" (Note: "Sledgehammer" is included in the United Kingdom digital single release of "Boss" as the latter was released simultaneously and was served as promotion.) – 3:52
- Promo CD
1. "Boss" (Radio Disney Edit) - 2:51
2. "Boss" (Album Version) - 2:51
3. "Boss" (Instrumental) - 2:51

== Credits and personnel ==
Recorded at The Venice Studio (Venice, Los Angeles) and The Record Plant (Los Angeles)
Mixed at Larrabee Sound Studios (North Hollywood)

- Fifth Harmony – vocals
- Eric Frederic – songwriter, production, programming, recording
- Joe Spargur – songwriter, production, programming, recording
- Gamal Lewis – songwriter
- Daniel Kyriakides – songwriter, production, programming, horns, recording
- Jacob Kasher Hindlin – songwriter
- Taylor Parks – songwriter, vocal production
- Jaycen Joshua – mixing
- Ryan Kaul – mixing assistant
- Maddox Chhim – mixing assistant

Credits adapted from the liner notes of Reflection.

== Charts ==
| Chart (2014) | Peak position |
|---|---|
| Canada Hot 100 (Billboard) | 75 |
| Czech Republic Singles Digital (ČNS IFPI) | 39 |
| Slovakia Singles Digital (ČNS IFPI) | 40 |
| Spain (Promusicae) | 37 |
| Scotland Singles (OCC) | 12 |
| UK Singles (OCC) | 21 |
| US Billboard Hot 100 | 43 |
| US Pop Airplay (Billboard) | 37 |

== Certifications ==
| Region | Certification | Certified units/sales |
|---|---|---|
| New Zealand (RMNZ) | Gold | 15,000^{‡} |
| United Kingdom (BPI) | Silver | 200,000^{‡} |
| United States (RIAA) | Platinum | 1,000,000^{‡} |
^{‡} Sales+streaming figures based on certification alone.

== Release history ==
| Country | Date | Format | Label |
|---|---|---|---|
| United States | July 7, 2014 | Digital download | Epic; Syco |
| United States | July 15, 2014 | Mainstream airplay | Epic; Syco |
| United Kingdom | December 7, 2014 | Digital download | Syco |
