= The Dirty Rooks =

- The Dirty Rooks before a performance at The Abbey Pub in Chicago in 2008.

Background information
- Origin: Chicago, Illinois, United States
- Genres: Rock, blues rock, booze-rock
- Years active: 2005–present
- Label: Independent
- Members: Dan Stalilonis (vocals/harmonica) Grant Gholson (guitar) Michael Bailey (guitar) Andrew Price (bass) Nathan Urbansky (drums) Tyler Wolff-Ormes (piano/organ)
- Past members: Ben Hunt Ronald Price Christopher Peterson Alan Bailey
- Website: www.dirtyrooks.com

The Dirty Rooks are an American rock band from Chicago, Illinois.

== History ==
The band was formed by Grant Gholson and Dan Stalilonis as Moustache in 2003, but were forced to abandon the name after being booked for a gig intended for another band of the same name. After Ben Hunt and Nathan Urbansky (originally billed as Nathan Urqhuart) joined in 2005, the group changed its name to The Dirty Rooks. According to band members, the name comes from the slang use of the word "rook" meaning to swindle or cheat and derived from the thieving, magpie-like tendencies of the common rook.

As they played in various small clubs in Chicago, The Dirty Rooks began receiving notice as a classic blues-rock revival group similar to The Black Crowes. In 2007 they were Top 20 finalists in the Lollapalooza Last Band Standing contest, nearly winning a performance slot at the festival.

Guitarist Michael Bailey joined in 2008, and after sitting in with the band for several years, keyboardist Alan Bailey joined as an official member in 2010. Bailey left the band in 2012.

After a lengthy hiatus, bassist Christopher Peterson joined in 2015, joined by drummer Ronnie Price and keyboardist Tyler Wolff-Ormes in 2016. Returning to the Chicago club scene later that year, the band released a holiday single, "A Very Dirty Christmas," in December. Both Peterson and Price left the band in 2018 and 2019, respectively. Andrew Price replaced Peterson on bass, and original drummer Nate Urbansky returned to finish recording a new studio album, The Camel, the band's fourth.

The Dirty Rooks have played with well-known acts like The Steepwater Band, The Waco Brothers, Jon Langford, Lez Zeppelin, Foghat, and Blue Öyster Cult.

== Style and influences ==
The Dirty Rooks have been described as "booze rock," blues rock, and classic rock. Band members cite several classic rock and blues acts as integral to their sound, including Joe Cocker, the Faces, and the Band. Their music has been compared to classic-rock artists such as The Rolling Stones, The Faces, and Led Zeppelin.

== Albums ==
=== The Dirty Rooks ===
The band released its eponymous first album in 2007. Tom Lynch of Newcity said of the album, "rock 'n' roll hasn't been this drunk in a while." It went on to become a top seller in the pub rock genre on CD Baby.

=== Sugar Mama ===
In 2010 the band released a second album, titled Sugar Mama. The album and concert celebrating its release were recommended by several media outlets covering the Chicago music scene, including Centerstage, RedEye/Metromix, Newcity, and A.V. Chicago. Like its predecessor, it became a top seller on CD Baby.

=== This Is Grand ===
2012 saw the release of the band's 3rd album, This Is Grand. The album was recorded at Kingsize Sound Lab on Chicago's West Side. It was the second time The Dirty Rooks recorded with producer Mike Hagler (Wilco, Neko Case), along with Jon Langford (Waco Brothers, The Mekons), and James Elkington (The Zincs, The Horse's Ha). The topical progression of the songs on the album form a narrative arc moving from self-defeating selfishness (Death in the Afternoon; Slow) to self-actualization through empathy (Popular; When It's Love/And It's Love). It was given a favorable review in the Illinois Entertainer.

=== The Camel ===
The band's fourth album, The Camel, was released in the summer of 2020. It was produced by Packy Lundholm (I Fight Dragons) and mastered by Collin Jordan at The Boiler Room (Kanye West, Buddy Guy). Due to the fact that it was recorded over a two-year span—during which time the band experienced several line-up changes—the album ranges over multiple genres and features no particular "sound;" indeed, the title self-consciously acknowledges the inefficiencies of design by committee (as reflected in the expression "a camel is a horse designed by a committee.") It marks the band's most political music to date, with songs critical of Donald Trump and Trumpism, the dehumanizing effects of personal technology, and the erosion of social bonds by modern individualism and late capitalism.
