= Sugar Daddy =

A sugar daddy is a man who offers support (typically financial and material) to a younger companion in exchange for romantic

Sugar Daddy may refer to:

== Music ==
- Sugardaddy (duo), a British music duo
- Sugar Daddy Live, a 2011 live album by the Melvins
- "Sugar Daddy" (The Bellamy Brothers song), 1980
- "Sugar Daddy" (The Jackson 5 song), 1971
- "Sugar Daddy" (Thompson Twins song), 1989
- "Sugar Daddy" (Macy Gray song), a song by Macy Gray from the 2018 album Ruby
- "Sugar Daddy", a song from the 1998 musical and 2001 film Hedwig and the Angry Inch
- "Sugar Daddy", a song by Cuban Link featuring Mýa from the 2005 album Chain Reaction
- "Sugar Daddy", a song by D'Angelo from the 2014 album Black Messiah
- "Sugar Daddy", a song by Fleetwood Mac from the 1975 album Fleetwood Mac
- "Sugar Daddy", a song by Laika from the 1994 album Silver Apples of the Moon
- "Sugar Daddy", a song by Mýa from the 2008 album Sugar & Spice
- "Sugar Daddy", a song by Qveen Herby from the 2020 EP 8
- "Sugar Daddy", a song by Richie Sambora from the 2012 album Aftermath of the Lowdown
- "Sugar Daddy", a song by The Badloves from the 1993 album Get on Board
- "Sugardaddy", a 2024 song by Roxy Dekker

== Other uses ==
- Sugar Daddy (candy), a caramel lollipop
- Sugar Daddy (film), a 2020 Canadian drama film
- "Sugar Daddy" (Ugly Betty), a 2009 episode of the TV drama
- Sugar Daddies, a 1927 Laurel & Hardy film
- Sugar Daddies (play), by Alan Ayckbourn, 2003
- Sugar Daddy, a 2007 novel by Lisa Kleypas
- "Sugar Daddy", a 2017 episode of Black-ish

== See also ==
- Sugar Baby (disambiguation)
- Sugar Man (disambiguation)
- Sugar Mama (disambiguation)
