= Fatima Robinson =

American dancer (born 1971)

- Born: August 29, 1971 (age 55); Little Rock, Arkansas, U.S.
- Occupations: Music video director, choreographer
- Years active: 1992–present
- Website: www.fatimarobinson.com

Fatima Robinson (born August 29, 1971) is an American dancer, music video director and choreographer.

== Career ==
Robinson has choreographed dance routines (for live performances and music videos) for several musical and pop artists, notably for Michael Jackson ("Remember the Time") and for several hit songs performed by Aaliyah (incl. "Rock The Boat", "Hot Like Fire", "Try Again", "We Need A Resolution", "Are You That Somebody", and "More Than a Woman"). Additional high-profile dance routines choreographed by Robinson include the Backstreet Boys' "Everybody (Backstreet's Back)" and "As Long As You Love Me" and Mary J. Blige's "Family Affair", for which Robinson won the 2002 MTV Video Music Award for Best Choreography. Robinson choreographed and directed the "Hey Mama" and "My Humps" videos by The Black Eyed Peas (the latter co-directed by Malik Hassan Sayeed and the recipient of the 2006 MTV Video Music Award for Best Hip-Hop Video), "Taken for Granted" by Sia, "All About That Bass," "Dear Future Husband," and "No" by Meghan Trainor and Koda Kumi's "Touch Down" and "LALALALALA". Robinson's choreography credits in 2016 included Fergie's music video for "M.I.L.F. $", as well as Gwen Stefani's This Is What The Truth Feels Like Tour.

Robinson's choreography credits for film include Save the Last Dance (starring Julia Stiles and Sean Patrick Thomas), Dreamgirls (starring Beyoncé Knowles and Jennifer Hudson), and The Cheetah Girls: One World. In addition, Robinson choreographed the Black Eyed Peas' halftime show for Super Bowl XLV in 2011, and the December 2015 presentation of The Wiz Live!.

Robinson produced the September 2016 concert honoring the opening of the Smithsonian National Museum of African American History and Culture; the concert was recorded, edited, and later aired on television as Taking the Stage: African American Music and Stories That Changed America. She was involved is the Kendrick Lamar's 2016 Grammy's performance, and The Weeknd's 2016 Oscars performance of "Earned It". From 2014 to 2016, she served as segment producer and choreographer for the hit series The Voice.

In 2023, Robinson choreographed the movie musical The Color Purple and served as director of choreography for Beyoncé's Renaissance World Tour.

== Videography ==
=== 1993 ===
- Bobby Brown - Get Away

=== 1999 ===
- Mr. Vegas - Heads High

=== 2000 ===
- Sia - Taken For Granted (Version 2)

=== 2001 ===
- Athena Cage - All Or Nothing

=== 2004 ===
- Black Eyed Peas - Hey Mama

=== 2005 ===
- Black Eyed Peas - My Humps

=== 2006 ===
- Fergie - Fergalicious

=== 2007 ===
- Hilary Duff - Stranger

=== 2008 ===
- Alina - When You Leave (Numa Numa) feat. Basshunter

=== 2009 ===
- Sabrina Bryan - Byou 2

=== 2012 ===
- Cheryl - A Million Lights: Live At The O2 (Creative Director)

=== 2013 ===
- Fergie - A Little Party Never Killed Nobody (All We Got) feat. Q-Tip & GoonRock (August 6)

=== 2014 ===
- Fifth Harmony - Bo$$ (July 7)
- Fifth Harmony - Sledgehammer (November 25)
- Meghan Trainor - All About That Bass

=== 2015 ===
- Meghan Trainor - Dear Future Husband

=== 2016 ===
- Meghan Trainor - No

=== 2017 ===
- Fergie - Tension

=== 2026 ===
- Snoop Dogg - Lied 2 U
