= Jacob Whitesides =

American singer-songwriter (born 1997)

- Born: Jacob Michael Whitesides; November 11, 1997 (age 28); Sevierville, Tennessee, U.S.
- Genres: Pop; Indie; R&B
- Occupations: Singer; songwriter
- Instruments: Vocals; guitar
- Years active: 2008–present
- Labels: Double U Records; JW Records; BMG Rights Management

Jacob Michael Whitesides (born November 11, 1997) is an American singer-songwriter from Sevierville, Tennessee. He records his music for Double U Records, of which he is also the CEO. Whitesides typically writes his songs alone, which he says is because his music is "very specific to [his] story."

== Career ==
=== 2008–14: Career beginnings, The X Factor ===
Growing up in Sevierville, Tennessee, Whitesides first became interested in music while attending a bluegrass festival in 2008. By his teens, Whitesides was playing shows around Knoxville and had already garnered a huge online following for his YouTube cover songs. In 2012, at 14 age he auditioned for season 2 of the US The X Factor and made the first cut but was eliminated prior to the Top 16 round.

Whitesides released his debut extended play 3 AM – The EP on July 8, 2014, featuring cover songs of John Legend, Plain White T's, Sam Smith, Ed Sheeran and John Mayer. The EP reached number 26 on the Billboard 200 and number 2 on the Independent Albums chart.

A local newspaper in Jacob's hometown, The Knoxville Focus was the first media organization to cover Jacob Whitesides career. Music beat reporter Daniel Andrews, travelled out to Nashville, Tennessee to cover Jacob Whitesides at an event called "Teen Hoot" on July 15, 2012.

=== 2015–present: Record deal and debut album Why? ===
On February 14, 2015 Whitesides released his second EP A Piece of Me, including previously released single "Words".

In May 2015, BMG announced their partnership with Whitesides and the formation of his label, Double U Records, where he is CEO. In August 2015, he was named Radio Disney's "Next Big Thing" featured artist.

On October 21, 2015, he performed his single "Secrets" on Good Morning America, his network morning TV debut. He released his third EP (second of original material) Faces on Film on October 23, 2015.

On December 3, 2015, Spotify announced him as one of the next big artists to look out for in 2016.

Earlier in 2016, Whitesides announced Lovesick Tour scheduled to take place Northern America and Europe from May to October 2016. On April 15, 2016 Whitesides released the song "Lovesick", the lead single from his debut album.

On July 6, 2016, Whitesides announced his debut studio album, Why?, to be released on September 9, 2016. On July 8, 2016 was premiered album's second single "Focus" along with a music video. On September 1, 2016, a third single, "Open Book" was released, along with a music video the following day

Jacob Whitesides released his album "Why?" on September 9, 2016. It debuted and peaked at number 25 on the Billboard Independent Charts.

Spring 2017, Jacob Whitesides announced his summer tour, The Basically Happy Tour touring throughout USA and Canada with Alec Joseph, Castro, and Taylor Grey.

In March 2019, Viktor & Rolf named Whitesides as their new face of their Spicebomb fragrance.

== Personal life ==
Jacob grew up in Tennessee with his mother, Becky, and his younger sister, Sierra. Whitesides dated fellow The X Factor contestant and performer Bea Miller in April 2015. The couple broke up in May 2016 after a year of dating.

Jacob has been open about struggling with depression, which he discusses on his 2021 track "Afraid To Die." He says his goal in sharing his experiences is to help fans in "knowing they aren't alone if they're feeling or have felt the same way."

== Discography ==
=== Studio albums ===
| Title | Details | Peak chart positions | |
| Title | Details | US | US Ind. Albums |
|---|---|---|---|
| Why? | Released: September 9, 2016; Label: Double U Records; Formats: CD, digital download, streaming | — | 25 |
| Colors | Released: November 8, 2019; Label: JMW Music LLC; Formats: Digital download, streaming | — | — |

=== Extended plays ===
| Title | Details | Peak chart positions | | | Sales |
| Title | Details | US | US Digital Albums | US Ind. Albums | Sales |
|---|---|---|---|---|---|
| 3 AM – The EP | Released: July 8, 2014; Label: Loudr; Formats: Digital download | 26 | 9 | 2 | |
| A Piece of Me (EP) | Released: February 14, 2015; Label: JW Records, Double U Records; Formats: Digital download | 75 | 23 | 3 | |
| Faces on Film (EP) | Released: October 23, 2015; Label: Double U Records; Formats: CD, digital download | — | — | 26 | US: 4,000 |
"—" denotes items which failed to chart.

=== Singles ===
| Title | Year | Album |
|---|---|---|
| "You're Perfect" | 2014 | Non-album single |
| "Words" | 2014 | A Piece of Me |
| "I Know What You Did Last Summer" (featuring Kelly Rowland) | 2015 | Non-album single |
| "Secrets" | 2015 | Faces on Film |
| "Lovesick" | 2016 | Why? |
| "Focus" | 2016 | Why? |
| "Open Book" | 2016 | Why? |
| "The Letter" | 2017 | Non-album singles |
| "Killing Me" | 2017 | Non-album singles |
| "Whole" | 2019 | Non-album singles |
"—" denotes items which failed to chart.

=== Music videos ===
List of music videos, showing year released and directors
| Title | Year | Director | Ref. |
|---|---|---|---|
| "You're Perfect" | 2014 | Carl Diebold | |
| "Words" | 2014 | Cameron Johnson; Darwin Darling | |
| "Baby It's Cold Outside" (with Orion Carloto) | 2014 | Cameron Johnson; Darwin Darling | |
| "Not My Type at All" (Lyric video) | 2015 | William Hereford | |
| "Not My Type at All" | 2015 | Cameron Fife | |
| "Let's Be Birds" | 2015 | Julia Muecke | |
| "Ohio" | 2015 | Roman Luck | |
| "Lovesick" | 2016 | Cameron Fife | |
| "Focus" | 2016 | Paul Costabile | |
| "Open Book" | 2016 | Chris Crutchfield | |
| "The Letter" | 2017 | Jacob Whitesides; Mark Siegel | |
| "Killing Me" | 2017 | | |
