= 7/27 =

2016 studio album by Fifth Harmony

- Deluxe edition cover. The standard edition cover has the same image, but the picture frame is white, and the rest has a bright orange filter.

Studio album by Fifth Harmony
- Released: May 27, 2016
- Recorded: September–December 2015
- Studios: The Northership, Los Angeles; Windmark Recording, Santa Monica, California; The Hide Out Studios, London
- Genres: Pop; tropical house; R&B
- Length: 34:33
- Labels: Epic; Syco
- Producers: Aaron Pearce; Alexander Kronlund; Jack Antonoff; Ammo; Brian Garcia; BloodPop; DJ Snake; Tommy Brown; Zedd; DallasK; Kygo; Lukas Hilbert; The Monsters and the Strangerz; Alexander Izquierdo; Andrew Goldstein; Emanuel Kiriakou; Royal Z; Sir Nolan; Stargate

Fifth Harmony chronology
Reflection (2015)	7/27 (2016)	Fifth Harmony (2017)

Singles from 7/27
- 1. "Work from Home" Released: February 26, 2016; 2. "All in My Head (Flex)" Released: May 31, 2016; 3. "That's My Girl" Released: September 27, 2016

7/27 is the second studio album by American girl group Fifth Harmony, released by Syco Music and Epic Records on May 27, 2016. The record is the follow-up to the group's debut studio album Reflection (2015). Its lyrics discuss themes of female empowerment and love. It features guest appearances by American R&B and hip hop artists Ty Dolla Sign, Fetty Wap and Missy Elliott, and collaborations with producers Jack Antonoff, Kygo and Norwegian duo Stargate. 7/27 is primarily a pop, tropical house and R&B record that includes elements of reggae, funk, electronic dance music, hip hop and trap. Unlike the genres explored on Reflection, 7/27's songs incorporate new genres like tropical house. This is the final Fifth Harmony album to feature Camila Cabello before she left the group in December 2016 to pursue a solo career.

The album debuted at number four on the US Billboard 200, becoming the group's highest-charting album in the US to date, and selling 74,000 equivalent album units. 7/27 earned the group its first top-five entry in the United Kingdom, where it peaked at number three, and a top-five entry in Canada where it peaked at number three. Elsewhere, it peaked in the top fives of sixteen other countries, reaching number one in Spain and Brazil. To further promote the album, Fifth Harmony embarked on its fifth headlining concert tour, The 7/27 Tour, which visited North and South America, Europe and Asia. 7/27 received generally positive reviews from contemporary music critics.

"Work from Home" featuring Ty Dolla Sign, the album's lead single, was released on February 26, 2016. It peaked at number four on the Billboard Hot 100, becoming the group's highest-charting single in the United States and the first top-five entry from an all-female group to chart in ten years since "Buttons" by The Pussycat Dolls. Since its release, the song has charted in the top five of twenty-two countries. The second single, "All in My Head (Flex)" featuring Fetty Wap, charted in the top 25 of the US Billboard Hot 100 and sixteen other countries. Two promotional singles, "The Life" and "Write on Me", were made available before the album's release. The third and final single from the album, "That's My Girl", was sent to contemporary hit radio on September 27, 2016.

== Background and production ==
Fifth Harmony's full-length debut album Reflection, which was released in January 2015 through Epic Records and Syco Music, introduced the group into the music industry and gave them credibility and popularity. The tracks "Boss", "Sledgehammer" and "Worth It" were released as singles, the latter being the most successful, reaching number 12 on US Billboard Hot 100 chart. The album was also supported by the group's first headlining concert tour called The Reflection Tour, with various live performances in the North America, Europe and Asia. In 2015, the group was awarded "Group of the Year" at the Billboard Women in Music event.

Due to Fifth Harmony's positive commercial performance and accomplishments that year, Epic Records decided to develop the group's career, managing new recording sessions for its second album in September 2015, for which a release date of December 2015 was announced. The date was abandoned so the group could spend more time recording and organizing material. In conversation with Brennan Carley from Spin, Lauren Jauregui said the album would be released in "early 2016" and they were "putting final touches on it". Epic announced a release date of May 20, 2016, but this was later postponed by one week to May 27 to keep with the theme of 27. The following day, digital music platform iTunes updated the track list with two tracks under the explicit label, making this Fifth Harmony's first release to contain explicit lyrics. Each track was announced hourly through the group's Instagram page on April 28, 2016.

== Recording ==
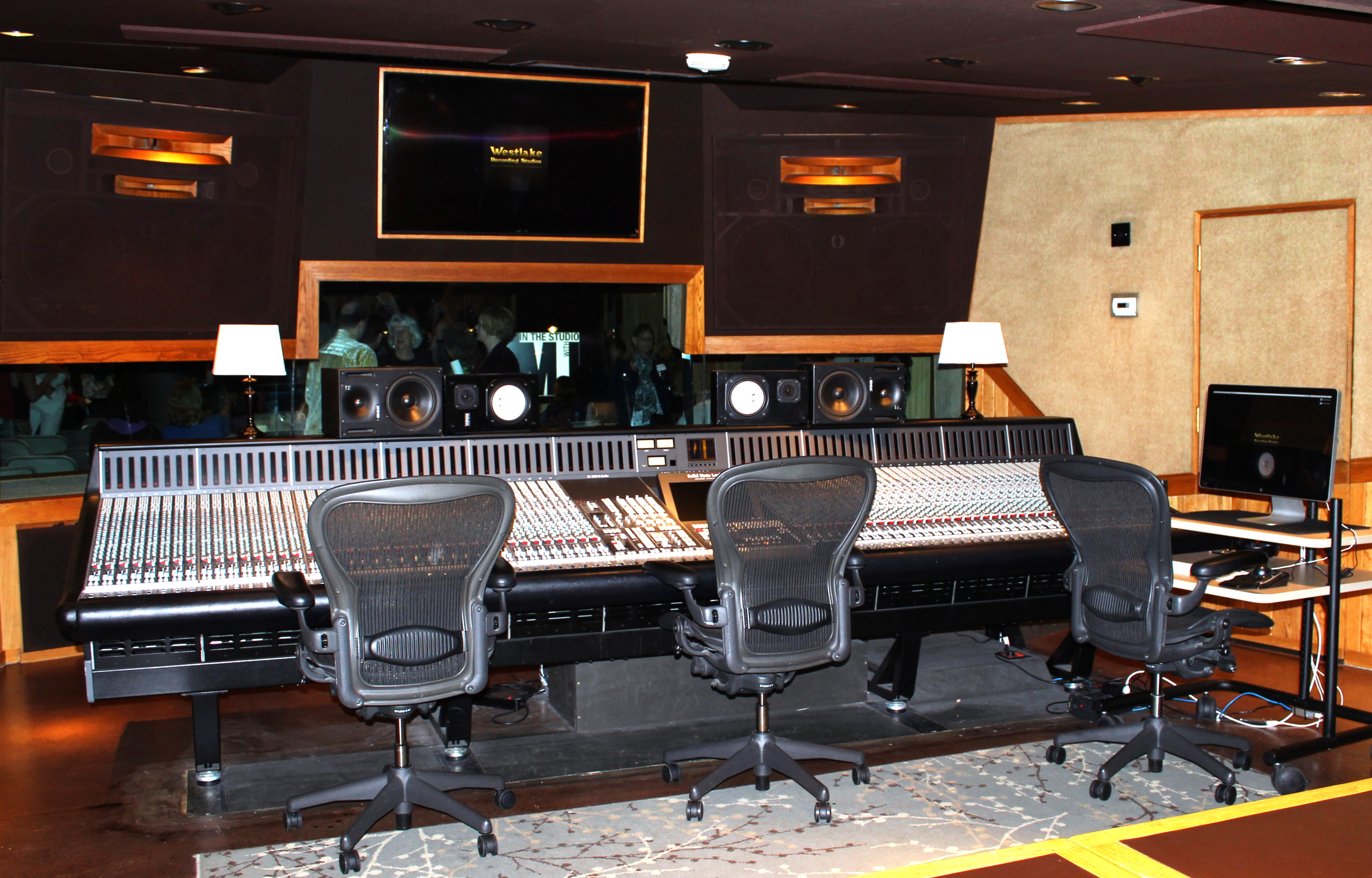
Part of the album was recorded at Westlake Recording Studios (pictured) located in Los Angeles.

In an interview with Billboard on September 21, 2015, Cabello revealed that Fifth Harmony was about to start the recording of the album, and that they had received some demos and the members were "super excited" about some of them. After finishing the second leg of its summer tour in October 2015, the group entered a studio in Los Angeles to start recording the second project. The group's initial sessions were at Max Martin's writing camp, where they worked with several music producers, including Martin, Lukas Loules, Dr. Luke, Mitch Allan and Jason Evigan. In a studio with Martin, they recorded four to five songs a day to experiment with sounds and vocal techniques. Jauregui said Martin was in "great spirit the whole time", creating a "good vibe for recording". As of November 2015, the group had finished six tracks but these were not included in the final tracklist. Only two songs created at MXM Studios—"That's My Girl" and "The Life", both of which were written by Tinashe and Alexander Kronlund, and produced by Lukas Loules—were included on the final cut.

Searching for a more "soulful" and "emotional" project, the group wanted to focus its energy on songs about heartbreak and romance. Fifth Harmony worked with Tor Erik Hermansen and Mikkel Storleer Eriksen, known collectively as Stargate, who had produced "Worth It". They recorded a considerable number of tracks produced by Stargate at Westlake Recording Studios in Los Angeles, two of which were finished by Norwegian DJ Kygo, who added his characteristic beat to "Squeeze" and "Write on Me". During the sessions at Westlake Studios, the group had more involvement with co-writing "All In My Head (Flex)". Priscilla Renea, Simon Wilcox, Benny Blanco, Julia Michaels, Brian Garcia and Nolan Lambroza were included in the production team that helped structure the album. American singer-songwriter Victoria Monét produced the vocal performances for more than half of the songs in the album.

American producers Ammo and DallasK created the lead single "Work from Home" with Jude Demorest, Alexander Izquierdo, and Brian Lee. The song came to the group after its A&R Joey Arbagey played it during a meeting to discuss the album direction; the members responded positively to the song, mostly for its "laid-back" and "chill" atmosphere that featured "a kind of urban pocket". They immediately recorded the track at Windmark Recording. "Not That Kinda Girl" was written by Aaron Pearce and Jared Cotter. After finishing the track, the group felt it was "incomplete" and suggested the presence of a rapper would fit the production; the group members contacted Missy Elliott, who accepted their invitation to write and record a verse for the song. The production team for the album was The Monsters and the Strangerz ("I Lied"), BloodPop ("Scared of Happy"), Jack Antonoff (who wrote "Dope" with Julia Michaels and Justin Tranter) and Tommy Brown ("No Way").

== Title and artwork ==
The album's title 7/27 refers to July 27, 2012, the date on which Fifth Harmony was formed on the American version of The X Factor. It was based on the members' identification with the music of the album, which they felt is more mature and personal than their previous release and selected a title to represent their growth as a group. Dinah Jane told Spin; "It's a side of Fifth Harmony that no one's really seen. In the beginning, we were super happy. Our first album was very jumpy. This time, we're showing who Fifth Harmony really is behind closed doors." The album's artwork and promotional pictures were photographed by Sasha Samsonova in a Californian desert; stylist Zoe Costello designed the costumes, the group's hair was styled by Clyde Haygood and Randy Stodghill, and makeup was done by Mylah Morales and Clarissa Luna. Samsonova said; "I love being on an all-girl set as it feels like a little family. When girls come together on set with an urge to create something great, there's nothing that can stop them."

The artwork shows the group on a desert road with a black car against a backdrop of mountains and a blue sky. In an interview with Music Choice, Cabello said the group was "really excited" about the album cover and proud of the visuals on the photoshoot because it represents the members' individuals aesthetics, describing the image as "kind of like a super glam fashion shot" that shows every member's style harmonizing with the others. The album's booklet contains photographs of each member posing in front of a gray t-top car. The title and the cover of the album were unveiled on February 25, 2016, on the group's official Instagram account with the caption; "We know there has been a lot of talk, but we wanted you to hear this from us ... Our new album 7/27 is coming May 20th".

== Composition ==
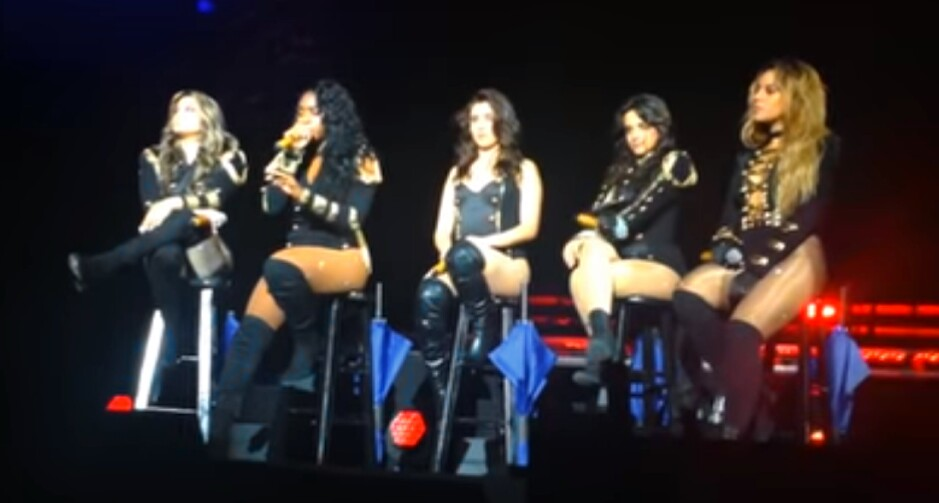
Fifth Harmony performing on the 7/27 Tour in 2016.

=== Music and lyrics ===
In conversation with Billboard, Epic Records' chairman and CEO L.A. Reid said 7/27 reflected the music that was predominating and growing into the mainstream in 2015 and early 2016, describing the album as a "modern" pop project. He affirmed that the group adapted their music to the current sound of radio at the moment, exemplifying the album Purpose (2016) by Justin Bieber and the music of DJs Calvin Harris, Skrillex and Diplo. 7/27's production can be considered more commercially viable than that of Fifth Harmony's previous album Reflection. Representing an extension of the band's musical catalog, much of the album consists of Electronic dance music (EDM) and tropical house, and like Reflection, this album incorporates urban contemporary music genres like R&B, hip hop and trap music. The album also has a funk-inspired track. Gerrick D. Kennedy from Los Angeles Times commented that the group explored more "radio trends on the bulk of the album"; while, The Atlantic's Spencer Kornhaber said the sound on the album was becoming "very familiar to the average radio listener".

Reflection was constructed from a feminist perspective using hip-hop and R&B as a support for its empowered content; 7/27, however, veers into a softer side with mid-tempo ballads driven by acoustic guitar chords and minimalist elements. According to Matt Collar from AllMusic, the album has the same "slick, contemporary R&B sound accented by a confident, feminist-informed attitude" as Reflection. The most tropical songs are crafted using elements from Caribbean music genres such as reggae, dancehall, soca music and ska in its beats and instrumentation. Rolling Stone's writer Christopher R. Weingarten said the beats of the record are "mostly booming or bouncy" and the "swagger is all over the place". The album has 15 tracks; (Note: "Voicemail" serves as a bonus track in the Napster version of the album, while the Japanese edition contributed with two additional songs ("Big Bad Wolf" and "1000 Hands").) its standard edition has 10 tracks while the deluxe edition has 12.

=== Songs and lyrical content ===
7/27's album opener track "That's My Girl" delivers a message of female empowerment. Its instrumentation includes "brassy horns, heavy bass, and an electronic drumroll". Gerrick D. Kennedy called the song a "horn driven bombast". The second track and lead single "Work from Home" incorporates elements of trap music with tropical beats. The song conveys a sexual tone using "work" as a euphemism for sexual seduction with synthesized hand-claps and heavy bassline. It contains a guest appearance by Ty Dolla $ign, who complemented the song's lyrical content using several sexual references. "The Life" has been described as a "danceable production, with a tropically-tinged drop building to a purely-pop chorus". According to Peter Meister from Sputnikmusic, it contains "eurodance-inspired beachhead synths that zoom across the bustling bass whilst they're singing of how far they've come". Its lyrics celebrates self-love and lifestyle with Fifth Harmony singing about "getting down on a beach in Dubai".

"Write On Me" is a tropical house song that has a characteristic soft production that blends acoustic guitar chords, pan flute synths, finger-snaps and tambourines. Lyrically, the song uses the human body as a metaphor to tell a lover to write their strengths, flaws and truths, exposing their true selves to the narrator. The fifth track "I Lied" is an upbeat trap song that makes use of heavy kick drums, finger-snaps and a minimalist piano during the pre-chorus and bridge. Lewis Corner of Digital Spy noted that the song "centres around high-pitched squiggles Diplo and Skrillex like to use". "All In My Head (Flex)" features hip hop recording artist Fetty Wap and contains an interpolation of the 1992 song "Flex" recorded by Mad Cobra. Fifth Harmony cowrote the song, which was initially developed by Priscilla Renea, Simon Wilcox, Benny Blanco, Julia Michaels, Brian Garcia and Nolan Lambroza. In contrast to the tropical sound of the album, "All In My Head (Flex)" blends reggae and pop music with elements of trap music. Additional instrumentation on the song includes a plucky guitar, synths and industrialized percussion.

Another tropical house song, "Squeeze" is built on a rousing kickbeat and features the group harmonizing over pulsating piano notes and auto-tuned vocal samples. It has been described as "a breezy, generic foot-stomper". "Gonna Get Better" is a remake of Vybz Kartel's song "Gon' Get Better" that contains a pulsating dancehall beat backed by acoustic guitar, synths and snaps. The song serves as a female representation of Kartel's version in which the protagonist says she will not leave her lover for another person. These interpretations are shown mainly in the chorus; "I won't leave you for a money man/No matter what we go through". According to Spencer Kornhaber of The Atlantic, the lyrics of "Gonna Get Better" find Fifth Harmony singing about sticking with a guy even when he can't pay for nice things". Matt Collar from AllMusic wrote that songs like "Squeeze", "I Lied" and "Write On Me" have a pleasant, mid-tempo, adult contemporary vibe. "Scared of Happy" has an uptempo beat that draws from soca and house genres; Lewis Corner described it as "vibrant house-pop fizz". The track's lyrics express vulnerability; the group sings about being scared of a response to a real love.

The tenth track "Not That Kinda Girl" featuring rapper Missy Elliott is a funk-inspired song with 1980s synths that string together with clinking clapping bass. Its retro sound received comparisons with works by singers Prince and Janet Jackson that have similar aesthetics and throwback "funky" sounds. The lyrics express an empowered feminist attitude and the group asserts they are not "that kind of girls" and warn men not to incorrectly classify them based on their attractiveness. The verses from Elliott support the message; "See, I'm not the kinda girl you can freak on the first date/I'm straight, that's right, I'll make ya wait". The slow jam "Dope" features Jauregui singing "I don't know what else to say but you're pretty fuckin' dope/just so you know" with contradicting emotions, culminating in spacial [sic] harmonies that surround and abide with the pulsating synths. The deluxe edition of the album concludes with "No Way", in which the group sings over a tumbling beat and light electronic effects; the track is downbeat compared with the rest of the album.

== Release and promotion ==
After announcing the album artwork for 7/27, Fifth Harmony released the lead single "Work from Home", which was performed for the first time at the annual post-Oscars show and broadcast by Live! with Kelly and Michael. Recreating the set of the music video and wearing the same costumes, the group performed the song on Jimmy Kimmel Live! on March 24, 2016. They also promoted the song on several television programs including The Ellen DeGeneres Show and 2016 Billboard Music Awards alongside Ty Dolla Sign on May 22, 2016. Following the event, they debuted "All In My Head (Flex)" during an encore performance on Xfinity.

On May 20, 2016, the group announced its second headlining tour, confirming 33 show dates in North America. To commemorate the album's release, Twitter added an exclusive, original emoji that appeared when users hashtagged "#5H727". The group also hosted an event at which the members gave fans virtual autographs; fans would tweet a photograph of the album using the tag #SignMe to win a physical copy signed by the members. Fans who pre-ordered copies of the album via FYE received a wristband that gave them access to signing events on May 30, May 31 and June 3 in Los Angeles, San Francisco and London.

Fifth Harmony's second worldwide tour, The 7/27 Tour, started on June 22, 2016, in Lima, Peru; its South American leg visited five cities in Brazil, Argentina and Chile. During the tour, the group appeared on some talk shows and performed "Work from Home" and "All In My Head (Flex)". In July 2016, they visited Tokyo, Japan, to perform at the Line Music Express event following the last show in Brazil. The North American leg began on July 27, 2016, in Manchester, New Hampshire, the date referencing the album's title and the fourth anniversary of the group's formation. On June 21, 2016, the group announced the European leg of the tour with 23 dates starting in Dublin, Ireland, on October 4 and finishing on October 29, 2016, in Antwerp, Belgium. Following Camila Cabello's departure from the group, Fifth Harmony announced a new Asian leg for the tour.

== Singles ==
The album's lead single, "Work from Home", was released on February 26, 2016, along with the album's pre-order. It was written by Joshua Coleman, Jude Demorest, Dallas Koehlke, Ty Dolla Sign, Alexander Izquierdo and Brian Lee. The song's music video was directed by Director X. It features the vocals of and appearance by American recording artist Ty Dolla Sign. The song debuted at number 12 on the Billboard Hot 100 and reached number four in its 13th week, making it the group's highest-charting single in the United States. Internationally, the song peaked within the top five of 35 countries and become the group's highest-charting single in the Netherlands, Germany, Australia, Canada, New Zealand and the United Kingdom.

The second single, "All in My Head (Flex)", featuring rapper Fetty Wap was serviced to radio stations on May 31, 2016. The music video was released on June 23, 2016. The song debuted at number 78 on the Billboard Hot 100 and peaked at 24. Since its release, the song charted within the top ten of Hungary and New Zealand, peaking in the top 20 of Australia and reaching the top 40 of Canada, Ireland, the Netherlands and the United Kingdom. In the United States, the single was certified platinum for selling combined sales and streaming of one million equivalent units. It was also certified platinum in Australia and Canada, and silver in the United Kingdom.

The third and final single, "That's My Girl", was serviced to contemporary hit radio on September 27, 2016. The song peaked at 73 on the Billboard Hot 100 and was certified gold for selling combined sales and streaming of 500,000 equivalent units. The music video was released on September 19, 2016. An alternate music video that features scenes from the web series DC Super Hero Girls and the movie DC Super Hero Girls: Hero of the Year was released on September 28, 2016.

=== Promotional singles ===
"The Life" was released as the first promotional single on March 24, 2016. It made its chart debut in the United Kingdom. The song peaked at number one on the Bubbling Under Hot 100 chart. "Write on Me" was released as the second promotional single on May 5, 2016. A music video for the song was released the following day on the group's Vevo channel and features all five members singing under spotlights while sitting on stools in a black-and-white setting.

== Critical reception ==
Professional ratings
Aggregate scores
Source	Rating
AnyDecentMusic?	6.6/10
Metacritic	70/100
Review scores
Source	Rating
AllMusic	3/5 stars
The Atlantic	Positive
The Boston Globe	positive
Digital Spy	4/5 stars
Entertainment Weekly	B
Idolator	3.5/5 stars
Pitchfork	6.2/10
Rolling Stone	3/5 stars
USA Today	2.5/4 stars
Spin	6/10

At Metacritic, which assigns a normalized rating out of 100 to reviews from mainstream critics, the album received an average score of 70, which indicates "generally favorable reviews", based on 7 reviews. Matt Collar of AllMusic was positive, calling it a "sophisticated production that finds the all-female outfit nicely transitioning from the brash ingenues who finished third on the second season of The X Factor into reliably mature pop divas". He noted that while 7/27 "isn't quite as loose or as fun as one might hope", Fifth Harmony prove they can balance "youthful swagger with grown-up sophistication". Praising the mature environment, Nolan Feeney of Entertainment Weekly named it "deep, vulnerable, personal--these were some of the quintet's stated goals for 7/27. It's not a bad look by any means."

Maura Johnston of The Boston Globe stated that "the group's power has always come from its Spice Girls-like ability to form a massive unit of self-actualization, and the peppy 7/27 has no shortage of that, both lyrically and musically". According to Lewis Corner of Digital Spy, "while the debut album Reflection was a mixed bag in terms of styles, 7/27 is a cleverly structured collection. The uptempo numbers pop off with confidence, while the slower tracks barely detract from the overall energy of the record. There's sass, there's vulnerability, there's sexiness; it draws upon all the emotions a great pop album craves." Christopher R. Weingarten of Rolling Stone said the album "isn't a massive step forward, but with a constant bombardment of hooks, high energy and incredible harmony there's not much time to catch your breath to compare". While reviewing the album along with Ariana Grande's Dangerous Woman (2016), Spencer Kornhaber of The Atlantic discussed the tendency to portray one gender's goodness and badness as being tied to promiscuity and material desperation present in pop music, and wrote that "Not That Kinda Girl" is a "rare finger-wagging formulation of a viewpoint otherwise contained in affirmations".

In a mixed review, Christoper Bohlsen of Renowned for Sound disliked the tropical house genre on the record, saying this musical style "doesn't suit" Fifth Harmony because they sound "anonymous" singing over "Kygo-styled beats". Despite that, Bohlsen called 7/27 a "solid pop album that manages to stand out from the crowd, with catchy singles, and a sense of confidence that can’t be found anywhere else". Writing for Spin, Brian Josephs referred to "I Lied" as the point where the album "regresses into blandness". He also comments on the way the group faced a "personality crisis" on Reflection that was not resolved in this record. Pitchfork editor Katherine St. Asaph shared similar sentiments, commenting that several songs "suffer from brutally protracted lyrical metaphors that function as near-parodies of pop song form" and that the group establishes neither a "sonic identity, nor a lyrical identity beyond vague empowerment". She notes how the album "dutifully triangulates every trend and radio format of the past couple years" and praised the group for their distribution of vocals.

Billboard ranked "Work From Home" at number 14 on its list of 100 Greatest Girl Group Songs of All Time: Critics' Picks.

== Commercial performance ==
In the United States, 7/27 debuted at number four on the Billboard 200, earning 74,000 equivalent album units (49,000 in traditional album sales) in its first week and becoming the group's highest-charting album to date. As of August 2017, according to Nielsen SoundScan, the album had sold over 200,000 copies in the US.

In Europe, 7/27 debuted at number six on the United Kingdom's Official Charts Company, and has since been certified Silver by the British Phonographic Industry. The album reached number one in both Spain and Brazil, becoming the group's first album to top both charts. It spent twenty weeks on the former chart and was certified three times platinum by Pro-Música Brasil. The album charted in the top ten of 13 other countries, including Norway, Portugal, and Sweden. It also entered the top five of Scotland and Ireland. Despite only peaking at number seven on the Dutch charts, it spent 29 weeks on the aforementioned chart.

The album debuted at number 20 in Japan on the Oricon Albums Chart, making it the group's first album to chart in Japan. In other Asian regions, the album entered the Taiwanese Albums chart at number three. So far, according to Billboard, it has accumulated 1.6 million equivalent album units worldwide as of November 2016.

== Track listing ==
Standard edition
No.	Title	Writer(s)	Length
1.	"That's My Girl"	Tinashe Kachingwe; Alexander Kronlund; Lukas Loules	3:24
2.	"Work from Home" (featuring Ty Dolla Sign)	Daniel Bedingfield; Joshua Coleman; Jude Demorest; Tyrone Griffin, Jr.; Alexander Izquierdo; Dallas Koehlke; Brian Lee; Larry Wells, Jr.	3:34
3.	"The Life"	Kachingwe; Kronlund; Loules	3:20
4.	"Write on Me"	Tor Hermansen; Mikkel Eriksen; Kyrre Gørvell-Dahll; Priscilla Renea; Simon Wilcox	3:39
5.	"I Lied"	James Abrahart; Izquierdo; Marcus Lomax; Jordan Johnson; Stefan Johnson; Oliver Peterhof; James Wong	3:23
6.	"All in My Head (Flex)" (featuring Fetty Wap)	Hermansen; Eriksen; Benjamin Levin; Brian Garcia; Daystar Peterson; Nolan Lambroza; Julia Michaels; Willie Maxwell II; Ewart Brown; Clifton Dillon; Richard Foulks; Herbert Harris; LeRoy Romans; Lowell Dunbar; Brian Thompson; Handel Tucker; Dinah Jane^{[a]}; Lauren Jauregui^{[a]}; Normani Kordei^{[a]}; Camila Cabello^{[a]}; Ally Brooke^{[a]}; Daniel Gonzalez^{[a]}	3:30
7.	"Squeeze"	Hermansen; Eriksen; Gørvell-Dahll; Renea; Wilcox; Lambroza	3:33
8.	"Gonna Get Better"	Adidja Azim Palmer; Linton Timajae White; Mario Antonia Dunwell	3:36
9.	"Scared of Happy"	Hermansen; Eriksen; Kachingwe; Michael Tucker; Cass Lowe	3:23
10.	"Not That Kinda Girl" (featuring Missy Elliott)	Aaron Pearce; Jared Cotter; Negin Djafari; Melissa Elliott	3:11
Total length:			34:33

United Kingdom standard edition
No.	Title	Writer(s)	Length
11.	"Worth It" (no rap)	Hermansen; Eriksen; Renea; Ori Kaplan	3:05
Total length:			37:38

Deluxe edition
No.	Title	Writer(s)	Length
11.	"Dope"	Jack Antonoff; Michaels; Justin Tranter	3:32
12.	"No Way"	Victoria Monét	2:56
Total length:			41:01

United Kingdom deluxe edition
No.	Title	Writer(s)	Length
13.	"Worth It" (no rap)	Hermansen; Eriksen; Renea; Ori Kaplan	3:05
Total length:			44:06

Napster edition
No.	Title	Writer(s)	Length
13.	"Voicemail"	John Ryan; Ross Golan; Ammar Malik; Jason Evigan; Lomax; Johnson; Johnson	3:02
Total length:			44:03

Japanese deluxe edition
No.	Title	Writer(s)	Length
13.	"Big Bad Wolf"	Emanuel Kiriakou; Andrew Goldstein; Evan Kidd Bogart; Clarence Coffee, Jr.	3:17
14.	"1000 Hands"	Adam Waldman; Jason Boyd; Georgia Ku	3:19
Total length:			47:37

=== Notes ===
- ^{^[a]} These writers are only credited on digital versions of the album.

=== Sample credits ===
- "All in My Head (Flex)" contains a portion of the composition "Flex", written by Ewart Brown, Clifton Dillon, Richard Foulks, Herbert Harris, LeRoy Romans, Lowell Dunbar, Brian Thompson and Handel Tucker.

== Personnel ==
Credits adapted from the liner notes of the Japanese deluxe edition of 7/27.

Locations

- Mixed at Callanwolde Fine Arts Center, Atlanta, California
- Mixed at MixStar Studios, Virginia Beach, Virginia
- Mastered at The Mastering Place, New York City

Personnel

- Ally Brooke – lead vocals, background vocals (all tracks)
- Normani Kordei – lead vocals, background vocals (all tracks)
- Dinah Jane – lead vocals, background vocals (all tracks)
- Lauren Jauregui – lead vocals, background vocals (all tracks)
- Camila Cabello – lead vocals, background vocals (all tracks)
- Ty Dolla Sign – featured artist (track 2)
- Fetty Wap – featured artist (track 6)
- Missy Elliott – featured artist (track 10)
- Lukas "Lulou" Loules – production (tracks 1, 3)
- Alex Purple – production (track 1)
- Ammo – production (track 2)
- DallasK – production (track 2)
- Stargate – production (tracks 3, 6–9)
- Kygo – production (tracks 4, 7)
- The Monsters & Strangerz – production (track 5)
- Oliver "German" Peterhof – production (track 5)
- James "Gladius" Wong – production (track 5)
- Brian Garcia – production (track 6)
- BloodPop – production (track 9)
- Aaron Pearce – production (track 10)
- Jack Antonoff – production (track 11)
- Tommy Brown – production (track 12)
- Emanuel Kiriakou – production (track 13)
- Andrew Goldstein – production (track 13)
- Royal Z – production (track 14)
- Tryna Loules – vocal production (tracks 1, 3)
- Victoria Monét – vocal production (tracks 6, 9, 12)
- Priscilla Renea – vocal production (track 7)
- Tommy Parker – vocal production (track 10)
- Julia Michaels – vocal production (track 11)
- Justin Tranter – vocal production (track 11)
- Tayla Parx – vocal production (track 11)
- Sir Nolan – additional production (track 6)
- Phil Tan – mixing
- Miles Walker – engineer, mixing
- Serban Ghenea – mixing
- Ryan Jumper – assistant engineer, mixing assistant
- John Hanes – mix engineering
- Dave Kutch – mastering
- Anita Marisa Boriboon – art direction, creative director, design
- Sasha Samsonova – photography

== Charts ==
=== Weekly charts ===
Chart (2016)	Peak position
Australian Albums (ARIA)	8
Austrian Albums (Ö3 Austria)	34
Belgian Albums (Ultratop Flanders)	9
Belgian Albums (Ultratop Wallonia)	35
Canadian Albums (Billboard)	3
Danish Albums (Hitlisten)	18
Dutch Albums (Album Top 100)	7
Finnish Albums (Suomen virallinen lista)	8
French Albums (SNEP)	55
German Albums (Offizielle Top 100)	41
Irish Albums (IRMA)	5
Italian Albums (FIMI)	20
Japan International Albums (Oricon)	2
Mexican Albums (AMPROFON)	9
New Zealand Albums (RMNZ)	8
Norwegian Albums (VG-lista)	8
Portuguese Albums (AFP)	7
Scottish Albums (Official Charts)	4
Spanish Albums (Promusicae)	1
Swedish Albums (Sverigetopplistan)	6
Swiss Albums (Schweizer Hitparade)	23
Taiwanese Albums (Five Music)	3
UK Albums (Official Charts)	6
US Billboard 200	4

=== Year-end charts ===
Chart (2016)	Position
Danish Albums (Hitlisten)	73
French Albums (SNEP)	200
Icelandic Albums (Tónlistinn)	90
Mexican Albums (AMPROFON)	57
Swedish Albums (Sverigetopplistan)	62
US Billboard 200	80

== Certifications and sales ==
Region	Certification	Certified units/sales
Brazil (Pro-Música Brasil)	3× Platinum	120,000^{‡}
Canada (Music Canada)	Platinum	80,000^{‡}
Denmark (IFPI Danmark)	Platinum	20,000^{‡}
France (SNEP)	Gold	50,000^{‡}
Mexico (AMPROFON)	Platinum	60,000^{‡}
New Zealand (RMNZ)	Platinum	15,000^{‡}
Poland (ZPAV)	Gold	10,000^{‡}
United Kingdom (BPI)	Gold	100,000^{‡}
United States (RIAA)	Platinum	1,000,000^{‡}
Summaries
Worldwide	—	1,600,000
^{‡} Sales+streaming figures based on certification alone.
