= That's My Girl =

2016 single by Fifth Harmony

Single by Fifth Harmony

from the album 7/27
- Released: September 27, 2016
- Studio: MXM Studios (Los Angeles, CA); Windmark Recording (Los Angeles, CA)
- Genre: R&B
- Length: 3:24
- Label: Epic; Syco
- Songwriters: Tinashe Kachingwe; Alexander Kronlund; Lukas Loules
- Producers: Kronlund; Loules

Fifth Harmony singles chronology
| "All in My Head (Flex)" (2016) | "That's My Girl" (2016) | "Down" (2017) |

Music video
- "That's My Girl" on YouTube

"That's My Girl" is a song recorded by American girl group Fifth Harmony. It was released and serviced to contemporary hit radio on September 27, 2016, through Epic Records and Syco Music as the third and final single from the group's second studio album, 7/27 (2016). The song was written by Tinashe Kachingwe, Alexander Kronlund, and Lukas Loules, with production handled by Kronlund and Loules. "That's My Girl" is mainly an R&B anthemic track with elements of electro-pop and lyrical themes focused on female empowerment, encouragement and feminist influences. Several critics noted similarities from the group's previous singles, which also feature an indistinguishable militaristic production.

"That's My Girl" was serviced to contemporary hit radio in the United States on September 27, 2016, the same day as its release. Prior to that, the track received airplay a month before, on Radio Disney. It debuted on the Billboard Hot 100 at its peak position of 73 and stayed on the charts for two consecutive weeks. In national airplay charts, the single earned a top 20 on the Mainstream Top 40 and charted within the top forty of the Hot Dance Airplay. Internationally, "That's My Girl" placed in the top 20 in Scotland, while charting in the top 40 in the United Kingdom. The song earned a gold certification in the United States and a platinum certification in the United Kingdom.

The accompanying music video was directed by Hannah Lux Davis and released on September 19, 2016. The dystopian clip follows the group around an apocalyptic setting where they perform choreographed dance routines and save people trapped around a village dressed in white-colored outfits, inspired by the film Mad Max. The group performed the track on national television for the first time at the 2016 American Music Awards. It received promotion in commercials for the 2016 Summer Olympics, which featured the United States Gymnastics team. A remixes extended play was released two months after its initial release. It is also the group's last single (alongside music video) as a quintet featuring member Camila Cabello, as she announced her departure from the group in December 2016 to pursue a solo career.

== Background and composition ==
"That's My Girl" was co-written by singer Tinashe, Alexander Kronlund, and Lukas Loules, who also handled the production with Kronlund. The song was written by Tinashe during an opening show for Katy Perry's Prismatic World Tour. The song was originally titled "She's My Girl" and was cited by Lauren Jauregui during an interview with Spin. "That's My Girl" was recorded by Sam Holland at MXM Studios and Windmark Recording, both in California, and mixed at MixStar Studios in Virginia Beach, Virginia. The horn arrangement was provided by Kronlund and Jonas Thander who also performed the saxophone, the trombone was played by Magnus Wiklund while the trumpets was performed by Stefan Persson and Karl Olandersson.

That's My Girl (2016)
A 20 second sample of the song's chorus which shows the group singing accompanied of and heavy bass, horns and electronic drumbeats.

"That's My Girl" was described an "R&B dance banger"; the song has a length of three minutes and twenty-four seconds. It is in the key of F minor, and written in common time with a moderate tempo of 101 beats per minute. Lyrically the song expresses a message of female empowerment. Its instrumentation includes "brassy horns, heavy bass, and an electronic drumroll". The song opens with Brooke singing the first verse: "Who's been working so damn hard?/ You got that head on overload," before praising "that flawless body", accompanied by horn samples. The pre-chorus is introduced by Jauregui who sings backed by Cabello harmonizing around her voice, "You've been down before/You've been hurt before/You've got up before/You'll be good to go. good to go." Normani then rap-sings in the chorus: "Destiny said it, you got to get up and get it/Get mad independent, don't you ever forget it." Adam R. Holz from website Plugged In Online, described "That's My Girl" as an "empowerment anthem that emphasizes the importance of women working hard, taking charge of their lives and not letting manipulative men define them."

== Critical reception ==
"That's My Girl" received positive reviews from music critics, with some noting its horn samples and theme of female empowerment. Writing for the Los Angeles Times, Gerrick D. Kennedy called the song a "horn driven bombast" and states that it "delivers a punchy message of female unity". While reviewing the album 7/27, Christopher R. Weingarten from Rolling Stone wrote that the track did not compare to "Boss", the group's first single from Reflection but concludes saying ""That's My Girl" bites its honking horns just fine and delivers a booming addendum to its empowering message". Digital Spy's Lewis Corner wrote, "'That's My Girl' is basically the bolder, more fierce cousin of 'Worth It' with its strutting brass and a chorus powerful enough to launch a NASA mission." Mike Neid from Idolator included the song in his "should have been bigger" category, praising the "harmonious and explosive cut" the group executed and its slick production.

In a mixed review, Michael Smith of Renowned for Sound criticized the song's production, commenting on how the transitions to different verses can "feel disjointed in a few ways". He also called the song a "confusing single choice" and mentions how the song "is far from the best that Fifth Harmony have had to offer". Smith gave the song a two-and-a-half out of five star rating. Conversely, Lucas Villa of AXS raved about the song, calling it "one of the best girl power anthems in pop music as of late" and said the group "slay accordingly with this brassy and sassy number." Sharing similar sentiments, Mike Wass from Idolator called the track a "sassy smash" saying it was "another fiery female empowerment anthem built around a killer horn sample." Entertainment Weekly called the song a "Worth It" sequel while Maura Johnston of The Boston Globe said the track was "stormy" and called it a "girl-power anthem tailor-made for post-breakup ladies’ nights out."

== Chart performance ==
"That's My Girl" charted on the Bubbling Under the Hot 100 for four weeks. Following the group's performance at the 2016 American Music Awards on November 20, 2016, the song debuted on the Billboard Hot 100 at number 73 for the week marked December 10, 2016. The following week, the song dropped to number 84, staying in that same position for one more week before officially exiting the chart. On national radio airplay, the song debuted at number 37 on the Mainstream Top 40, for the week dated October 22, 2016. The song rose to its peak position of 19 after charting for six weeks, earning the group their fourth top 20 single on this chart. On the Dance/Mix Show Airplay chart, the song peaked at number 37 after charting for four weeks.

On the Canadian Hot 100, the track debuted at 89 for the week marked at December 3, 2016. The next week, it reached its peak of 54 and would chart for an additional eight weeks. In Australia, "That's My Girl" debuted at number 79 before reaching its peak of 54 in its second week. The song had an early rise in the United Kingdom's Official Singles Chart where it debuted at number 57 for the week of October 14, 2016. It would eventually rise to its peak of 26 on November 11, earning the group their fifth top 40 entry. Elsewhere, the song peaked in the top 40 of four additional markets, including Scotland, Hungary and two Belgium charts.

== Music video ==
The music video was directed by Hannah Lux Davis and was released on September 19, 2016. It was filmed in a Californian desert.

=== Synopsis ===
Critics compared the setting and the white costumes to the film Mad Max.

The video begins as several helicopters make their way to a smoke-filled area near the mountains. Injured townsfolk are seen as the group then starts singing in solo shots in an all-black ensemble in front of a lit rock wall. In the following scene, the group walks to the ruined town in unity in a post-apocalyptic world setting, dressed in white clothes holding, initially, white flags, where they dance through the streets singing the song's lyrics. Each member moves the flags simultaneously as scenes from their all-black ensemble are spliced in between.

As the group makes their way to the core of the town, their faces are in shock as they hold onto one another's hands. The camera zooms individually on their faces before sprinting to rescue the townsfolk. They gather everyone behind them as they show their white flags to the oppressor, in a symbol for surrender and a calling for truce. Dinah is then shown singing the second verse with a red light on the background walking into a rustic bathroom where the camera then changes to Ally singing her verse followed by Camila and Lauren singing simultaneously. Then, the group is shown dancing and singing the chorus with red flags. Each member locks their hands together as a shimmering particles rises when they lift their hands upwards. The particles stay there as the group walks in circles around it. In the third bridge, the group forms a circle around a red power that explodes forming the number five with the following scene showing the group dancing in the ruined town at night with a dim light on the background.

The video ends showing the town in the shape of the number 5, in reference to the name of the group.

=== Reception ===
Several critics noted the influence of the movie Mad Max in the video conception, Sasha Geffen from MTV noted that "their outfits look like they could have been pulled from the Mad Max: Fury Road wardrobe, though there are no War Boys to be spotted in the desert landscape. Girls rule this post-apocalypse — maybe it's a sequel." Entertainment Weekly's Nolan Feeney wrote that "the quintent played sexy emergency workers in a Hunger Games-esque dystopian society that's been rocked by catastrophe." Digital Spy's Lewis Corner called the video "epic" and a "blockbuster visual", the group a "vision of solidarity". Corner complimented the fierce look the group demonstrated.

In an analysis by Vulture, Halle Keifer expressed a confused perspective on the video, asking "do people really want to see Fifth Harmony literally dancing in the rubble of a war-ravaged city?" Keifer noted that the abrupt dance routines distracted from the main story line of the video. Carl Williott from Idolator felt that the video was "a spiritual sequel" to the group's "similarly utilitarian "Work from Home" (2016) construction site visual." Mike Neid, from the same website as Williott, said that the video provided "sexy choreography and a powerful message of girl power" in an analysis from his "should have been bigger" category. Kelly Lawler of USA Today noted the video's nods to popular dystopian films including The Maze Runner and The Hunger Games. She also called the dancing "impeccable" and commended the group's emotional power in the vocals and the solid theme in the song. As of July 2020, the video has surpassed 205 million views.

== Live performances and usage in media ==
The group performed the song for the first time on television at the American Music Awards on November 20, 2016, with a "post-apocalyptic" set, similar to the music video of the song, as well as the girls wearing the same outfits. According to editor Andrew Unterberger from Billboard, it was the fourth best performance of the night. "That's My Girl" was included in the setlist for the 7/27 Tour.

The X Factor series 13 contestant Gifty Louise performed a cover of the song during the live week one, which received the favour and praise of all four judges. The group also performed the song as a part of the segment for Dick Clark's New Year's Rockin' Eve. The girls sang the song at the FunPopFun Festival in Brazil. British pop rock band The Vamps covered the track at the BBC Radio 1 Live Lounge. The song also came out on the trailer for the 2017 comedy film Girls Trip and it was used briefly in The Paw Patrol movie. It was also featured on the second season of the American sitcom The Real O'Neals.

An alternate music video was released on October 6, 2016, and features scenes from the TV series Mom mixed in with clips from the actual music video. The song was also featured in a music video for the United States women's gymnastics team for the Rio 2016 Olympics. In the video, each member of Fifth Harmony appears individually against a brightly lit backdrop. The group's members sing the song between clips of the United States gymnasts.

== Formats and track listings ==
- Digital download (Remixes)
1. "That's My Girl" (Ryan Riback Remix) – 3:16
2. "That's My Girl" (Jimmie Club Mix) – 3:38
3. "That's My Girl" (Eva Shaw Remix) – 3:13
4. "That's My Girl" (Boaz van de Beatz Remix) – 3:25

== Credits and personnel ==
Credits adapted from 7/27's liner notes.

Recording

- Recorded at Westlake Studios (Los Angeles), Windmark Recording (Santa Monica, California) and The Hide Out Studios (London, United Kingdom)
- Mixed at Callanwolde Fine Arts Center (Atlanta, California)
- Mastered at The Mastering Place (New York City)

Personnel

- Alexander Kronlund – writer, production
- Lukas Loules – writer, production
- Tinashe Kachingwe – writer
- Ally Brooke Hernandez – vocals
- Normani Kordei Hamilton – vocals
- Lauren Jauregui – vocals
- Camila Cabello – vocals
- Dinah Jane Hansen – vocals
- Katerina Loules – backing vocals
- Lulou – bass, guitar, synth, drums, producer
- Serban Ghenea – mixer
- Tryna Loules – vocal producer
- Jonas Thander – saxophone, horn arrangement & recording
- Alex Purple – saxophone, drums, producer, horn arrangement
- Magnus Wiklund – trombone
- Karl Olandersson – trumpets
- Stefan Persson – trumpets

== Charts ==
=== Weekly charts ===
| Chart (2016–2017) | Peak position |
|---|---|
| Australia (ARIA) | 54 |
| Belgium (Ultratip Bubbling Under Flanders) | 8 |
| Belgium (Ultratip Bubbling Under Wallonia) | 30 |
| Brazil (Billboard Brasil Hot 100) | 96 |
| Canada Hot 100 (Billboard) | 54 |
| Canada CHR/Top 40 (Billboard) | 28 |
| Canada Hot AC (Billboard) | 41 |
| Czech Republic Airplay (ČNS IFPI) | 42 |
| Hungary (Rádiós Top 40) | 23 |
| Ireland (IRMA) | 46 |
| Japan Hot 100 (Billboard) | 68 |
| New Zealand Heatseekers (RMNZ) | 5 |
| Scottish Singles Sales (Official Charts) | 12 |
| Slovakia Airplay (ČNS IFPI) | 79 |
| UK Singles (Official Charts) | 26 |
| US Billboard Hot 100 | 73 |
| US Dance Airplay (Billboard) | 37 |
| US Pop Airplay (Billboard) | 19 |

=== Year-end charts ===
| Chart (2016) | Position |
|---|---|
| Brazil (Brasil Hot 100) | 91 |

== Certifications ==
| Region | Certification | Certified units/sales |
|---|---|---|
| Canada (Music Canada) | Gold | 40,000^{‡} |
| France (SNEP) | Gold | 100,000^{‡} |
| Mexico (AMPROFON) | Gold | 30,000^{‡} |
| New Zealand (RMNZ) | Platinum | 30,000^{‡} |
| Poland (ZPAV) | Gold | 10,000^{‡} |
| United Kingdom (BPI) | Platinum | 600,000^{‡} |
| United States (RIAA) | Gold | 500,000^{‡} |
^{‡} Sales+streaming figures based on certification alone.

== Release history ==
| Region | Date | Format | Label | Ref. |
|---|---|---|---|---|
| United States | September 27, 2016 | Contemporary hit radio | Epic | |
| United Kingdom | October 12, 2016 | Contemporary hit radio | Epic; Syco | |
