= Write on Me =

Promotional single by Fifth Harmony

from the album 7/27
- Released: May 5, 2016
- Studio: Westlake Recording Studios (Los Angeles, California, US); The Hide Out Studios (London, England)
- Genre: Pop, tropical house
- Length: 3:39
- Label: Epic; Syco
- Songwriters: Mikkel Eriksen; Tor Erik Hermansen; Kyrre Gørvell-Dahll; Priscilla Renea; Simon Wilcox
- Producers: Stargate; Kygo

"Write on Me" is a song by American girl group Fifth Harmony from their sophomore studio album, 7/27 (2016). It was released as the album's second promotional single on May 5, 2016, on iTunes and other digital and streaming services. The song was written by duo Mikkel Eriksen and Tor Erik Hermansen of Stargate, Kygo, Priscilla Renea, and Simon Wilcox, with production handled by Eriksen, Hermansen, and Kygo. It is a mid-tempo, pop number that uses synths, tambourines, an acoustic guitar, and finger-snaps as its instrumentation. Critics noted that it had a slower melody from the group's previous songs.

Lyrically, the song uses the human body as a metaphor to tell a lover to expose their strengths, flaws, and truths. Inspired by the lack of ballads on their previous records, the group wanted to create more variety and a different atmosphere that their public have not heard before. "Write on Me" was the last promotional single before the group released their album. Upon availability, the song charted in Czech Republic and Scotland. As part of the track's promotion, the group performed the song for the first time at Wango Tango, two weeks before the album's release. It was subsequently included in The 7/27 Tour.

== Background and production ==
"Write on Me" was written and co-produced by Norwegian duo Mikkel Eriksen and Tor Erik Hermansen of Stargate and Kyrre Gørvell-Dahll with additional writing from Priscilla Renea and Simon Wilcox. Other personnel involved in the production of the song include mixing engineer Phil Tan, mastering engineer Dave Kutch, assistant engineer Daniela Rivera and recording engineers Eriksen, Miles Walker and Mike Anderson. While recording music for their sophomore album, Fifth Harmony was keen in including a ballad number. Cabello told Entertainment Weekly that fans would see "more of a vulnerable side" to them. This was something that was not very present in their debut album, Reflection (2015). The song was released on streaming service Spotify and digital music platform iTunes on May 5, 2016. The track was also made available on Google Play the following day.

Write On Me
Sample of the song's tropical house sound. It uses finger snaps, tambourines, acoustic guitar and synths as its instrumentation.

As a pop song, "Write on Me" was noted for having "slow melody" in comparison to Fifth Harmony's previous works, using synths, tambourines, finger-snaps and an acoustic guitar as its foundation. As for Sasha Geffen from MTV News, the song blends "acoustic guitar chords with tropical synths", while using a calm instrumentation instead of "big beats". Camila Cabello who was member of the group during its release, and Ally Brooke found the track to showcase the group's vulnerability in separate statements. Cabello said that it was her personal favorite song, saying that the track was "an extended metaphor where you're asking somebody to 'write' on you, envelop you with their words, make their mark on you like you're a blank canvas."

== Reception ==
=== Critical response ===
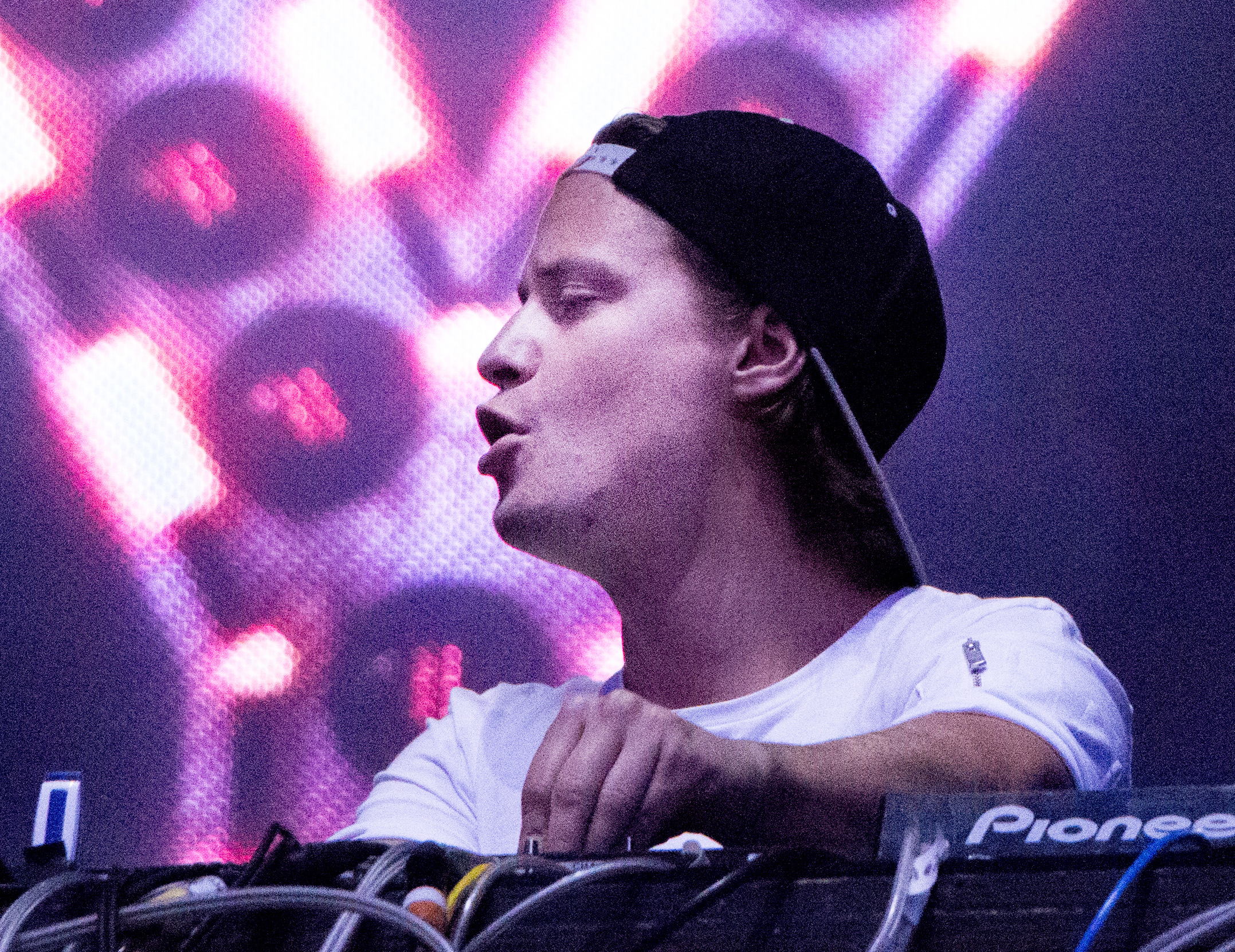
Music critics compared "Write on Me" to the musical style of Kygo (pictured in 2013).

Upon its release, "Write on Me" generated positive commentaries by music critics who complimented the song's soft tropical production and departure from their previously released songs, for example, Dana Getz of Entertainment Weekly who called the song "another bop", noted the slower rhythm of the song in comparison to "Work from Home" and "The Life" but mentions the similar "anthemic" atmosphere all three songs display. Billboard magazine expressed similar statements to Getz, calling the song powerful while also distinguishing the "laid back" atmosphere from their past single, "Work from Home". The article states that each member is allowed their turn "in the spotlight, switching off verses on the power jam."

Some writers such as Brittany Spanos from Rolling Stone, Fuse's Jeff Benjamin and Brennan Carley of Spin acclaimed the song noting its resemblance to Kygo's musical style. Brittany Goldfield Rodrigues from Andpop raved about the song's "infectious beat" and its heartfelt lyrics. She further states that the track "will give you chills, from the vocals to the lyrics." Echoing the thoughts of Carley, Lewis Corner from Digital Spy called the track one of their most understatedly "infectious bops yet," also complementing the group for not having suffered the dreaded second album syndrome, or sophomore slump, where the second album fails to live up to the standards of the first album.

=== Chart performance ===
On May 14, 2016, "Write on Me" debuted on UK Singles Charts at its peak position of number 173 and remained on the chart for one week. It also debuted at 92 in the Czech Republic, and 79 in Scotland, becoming the group's fifth entry on Scottish charts.

== Music video ==
The music video was directed by Sam Lecca and premiered on Vevo on May 6, 2016. The video, filmed in black and white, shows the five members of the group singing and dancing to the song. Regarding the video, member Normani Kordei expressed, "this is a different approach than we've done before." She stated that the video focuses more on the "lyrical content" as well as their "beauty shots" which is a new concept the group explores as "there's always so much going on." Brittany Rodrigues of website Andpop, described the video as "elegant" while Jessica McKiney from Hollywood Life perceived that Fifth Harmony definitely "brought the sex appeal" in the video, calling as "incredibly sexy". It was also called as "soulful" by Lindsey Barton who writes for Tiger Beat magazine. Teen Vogue's Isis Briones commented that the concept present in the video "definitely does the lyrics justice."

The black and white retro-inspired setting received positive commentaries from critics over its simplistic direction and "elegant" nature.

The video begins with a guitar being strummed in a cartoonish background as each member's white silhouette is shown making dramatic motions. Kordei's silhouette appears as she writes in the air and her form comes to life after drawing a heart on her wrist. After her verse, the camera moves to Cabello dancing. A close up of Lauren Jauregui is then shown with a dark silhouette of Cabello abruptly switching between takes. The scene transitions as multiple thick grey and black rectangular lines move towards the chorus of the song where each member is singing in stools, snapping their fingers with a spotlight on them. Individual takes of the each member are shown.

Brooke stares away from the camera, singing to a person who is not visible to the reader. She, similar to Cabello, acts in a sensual way. The guitar in the intro of the video is now in real-life form. In a negative special effects, the verse changes to Cabello, who is presented in different takes, including a silhouette, a normal background and a dim mirror image. The scene changes back to where each member was previously in stools, snapping in-sync to the beat of the song. As the video progresses, the rhythm intensifies with several individual takes of the group as the grey rectangular boxes slow the beat with a moving background of a sunset and blurry blue lines depicting waves as Cabello's image disappears. Soon after, the group is clustered together dancing, depicting what appears to be a photo-booth as the screen flashes several times. The video ends with each member's silhouette making hand motions as the camera pans upwards to reveal the album's title and group's logo.

== Credits and personnel ==
Recording

- Recorded at Westlake Recording Studios (Los Angeles, California) and The Hide Out Studios (London, England)
- Mixed at Callanwolde Fine Arts Center (Atlanta, California)
- Mastered at The Mastering Place (New York City)

Management

- Published by Sony/ATV Ballad (BMI) EMI April Music Inc. (ASCAP) o/b/o EMI Music Publishing LTD. (PBS)

Personnel

- Mikkel Storleer Eriksen – songwriter, production, instrumentation, recording
- Tor Erik Hermansen – songwriter, production, instrumentation
- Kygo – songwriter, production
- Priscilla Renea – songwriter
- Ally Brooke – vocals
- Camila Cabello – vocals
- Dinah Jane – vocals
- Lauren Jauregui – vocals
- Normani Kordei – vocals
- Mike Anderson – recording
- Miles Walker – recording
- Phil Tan – mixing
- Daniela Rivera – mixing assistant
- Dave Kutch – mastering

== Charts ==
Chart (2016)	Peak position
Czech Republic Airplay (ČNS IFPI)	92
Scottish Singles Sales (Official Charts)	79
UK Singles (Official Charts)	173
