= 7/27 Tour =

2016–17 concert tour by Fifth Harmony

The 7/27 Tour
- World tour by Fifth Harmony
- Promotional poster for the tour
- Location: Asia; Europe; North America; South America
- Associated album: 7/27
- Start date: June 22, 2016
- End date: April 8, 2017
- Legs: 5
- No. of shows: 72
- Box office: US$5.1 million (Note: US$6.84 million in 2025 dollars.)

Fifth Harmony concert chronology
- The Reflection Tour (2015–16); The 7/27 Tour (2016–17); PSA Tour (2017–18)

The 7/27 Tour was the fifth concert tour by American girl group Fifth Harmony, in support of their second studio album, 7/27 (2016). The tour began in Lima, Peru on June 22, 2016, and concluded in Singapore on April 8, 2017.

== Background and development ==
On May 20, 2016, the group announced the North American leg of the tour, consisting of 32 shows in the United States and one in Canada. The North American leg began on July 27, 2016 in Manchester, New Hampshire in reference to their album title and fourth anniversary since being formed on The X Factor. On June 21, the group announced the European leg of the tour with 23 dates starting in Dublin, Ireland on October 4 and commencing on October 29 in Antwerp, Belgium.

The opening acts were JoJo, Victoria Monét, Camryn, Lali, and Jake Miller. The Asian leg of the tour was announced in January 2017, following group member Camila Cabello's departure.

== Commercial performance ==
In January 2017, Pollstar's top 200 North American tours charts from 2016 were announced. Fifth Harmony ranked at #199 on the list with a domestic gross of $5.1 million from 158,051 tickets sold.

== Set list ==
This set list is representative of the show on September 9, 2016 in Irvine, California. It is not representative of all concerts for the duration of the tour.

1. "That's My Girl"
2. "Miss Movin' On"
3. "Sledgehammer"
4. "Reflection"
5. "This Is How We Roll"
6. "Scared of Happy"
7. "Write on Me"
8. "I Lied"
9. "No Way"
10. "We Know"
11. "Dope"
12. "Squeeze"
13. "Big Bad Wolf"
14. "Boss"
15. "Not That Kinda Girl"
16. "All in My Head (Flex)"
17. "Brave Honest Beautiful"
18. "Gonna Get Better"
19. "Voicemail"
20. "Worth It"

Encore

21. "Work from Home"

== Shows ==
List of 2016 concerts, showing date, city, country, venue, opening acts, tickets sold, number of available tickets and amount of gross revenue
Date (2016)	City	Country	Venue	Opening acts	Attendance	Revenue
June 22	Lima	Peru	Anfiteatro del Parque de la Exposición	—N/a	4,415 / 4,415	$245,669
June 24	Santiago	Chile	Movistar Arena	Lali	8,065 / 8,065	$461,590
June 26	Buenos Aires	Argentina	DirecTV Arena	—N/a	5,693 / 5,693	$262,580
June 28	Porto Alegre	Brazil	Pepsi on Stage	—N/a	3,675 / 4,600	$191,786
June 29	Curitiba	Brazil	Expo Unimed	—N/a	3,941 / 4,300	$223,617
July 1	Rio de Janeiro	Brazil	Vivo Rio	—N/a	3,686 / 3,686	$247,629
July 3	Brasília	Brazil	NET Live	—N/a	4,600 / 4,600	$252,559
July 5	São Paulo	Brazil	Espaço das Américas	—N/a	7,422 / 7,422	$445,402
July 27	Manchester	United States	Verizon Wireless Arena	JoJo; Victoria Monét	—N/a	—N/a
July 28	Boston	United States	Blue Hills Bank Pavilion	JoJo; Victoria Monét	—N/a	—N/a
July 29	Fairfax	United States	EagleBank Arena	JoJo; Victoria Monét	—N/a	—N/a
July 30	Uncasville	United States	Mohegan Sun Arena	JoJo; Victoria Monét	5,208 / 6,823	$203,112
August 2	New York City	United States	Ford Amphitheater at Coney Island	JoJo; Victoria Monét	—N/a	—N/a
August 3	Darien	United States	Darien Lake Performing Arts Center	JoJo; Victoria Monét	—N/a	—N/a
August 5	Bangor	United States	Darling's Waterfront Pavilion	JoJo; Victoria Monét	—N/a	—N/a
August 6	Providence	United States	Dunkin' Donuts Center	JoJo; Victoria Monét	—N/a	—N/a
August 7	Camden	United States	BB&T Pavilion	JoJo; Victoria Monét	—N/a	—N/a
August 9	Cleveland	United States	Jacobs Pavilion	JoJo; Victoria Monét	—N/a	—N/a
August 11	Toronto	Canada	Molson Canadian Amphitheatre	JoJo; Victoria Monét	—N/a	—N/a
August 13	Rochester Hills	United States	Meadow Brook Amphitheatre	JoJo; Victoria Monét	—N/a	—N/a
August 14	Noblesville	United States	Klipsch Music Center	JoJo; Victoria Monét	—N/a	—N/a
August 18	Virginia Beach	United States	Veterans United Home Loans Amphitheater	JoJo; Victoria Monét	—N/a	—N/a
August 19	Raleigh	United States	Red Hat Amphitheater	Victoria Monét; Jake Miller	—N/a	—N/a
August 20	Charlotte	United States	Charlotte Metro Credit Union Amphitheatre	Victoria Monét; Jake Miller	—N/a	—N/a
August 21	Nashville	United States	Carl Black Chevy Woods Amphitheater	Victoria Monét; Jake Miller	—N/a	—N/a
August 23	Atlanta	United States	Chastain Park Amphitheater	JoJo; Victoria Monét	—N/a	—N/a
August 25	Tampa	United States	MidFlorida Credit Union Amphitheatre	JoJo; Victoria Monét	—N/a	—N/a
August 26	West Palm Beach	United States	Perfect Vodka Amphitheatre	JoJo; Victoria Monét; Jake Miller	—N/a	—N/a
August 31	Chicago	United States	FirstMerit Bank Pavilion	JoJo; Victoria Monét	—N/a	—N/a
September 1	Kansas City	United States	Starlight Theatre	JoJo; Victoria Monét	—N/a	—N/a
September 2 (Note: The concert on September 2, 2016 at Hollywood Casino Amphitheatre in Maryland Heights is part of NOW96.3 presents NOW Night Out.)	Maryland Heights	United States	Hollywood Casino Amphitheatre	JoJo; Victoria Monét	—N/a	—N/a
September 4	Dallas	United States	Gexa Energy Pavilion	JoJo; Victoria Monét	—N/a	—N/a
September 5	The Woodlands	United States	Cynthia Woods Mitchell Pavilion	JoJo; Victoria Monét	—N/a	—N/a
September 6	Midland	United States	Midland County Horseshoe Arena	JoJo; Victoria Monét	—N/a	—N/a
September 8	Phoenix	United States	Ak-Chin Pavilion	JoJo; Victoria Monét	—N/a	—N/a
September 9	Irvine	United States	Irvine Meadows Amphitheatre	JoJo; Victoria Monét	—N/a	—N/a
September 10	Concord	United States	Concord Pavilion	JoJo; Victoria Monét	—N/a	—N/a
September 27	Mexico City	Mexico	Auditorio Nacional	—N/a	9,968 / 10,248	$479,934
September 29	Monterrey	Mexico	Auditorio Banamex	—N/a	—N/a	—N/a
October 1	Zapopan	Mexico	Auditorio Telmex	—N/a	4,805 / 8,103	$249,189
October 4	Dublin	Ireland	3Arena	Camryn; Aleem	—N/a	—N/a
October 6	Glasgow	Scotland	SSE Hydro	Camryn; Aleem	—N/a	—N/a
October 7	Manchester	England	Manchester Arena	Camryn; Aleem	—N/a	—N/a
October 8	Cardiff	Wales	Motorpoint Arena Cardiff	Camryn; Aleem	—N/a	—N/a
October 10	London	England	The O_{2} Arena	Camryn; Aleem	—N/a	—N/a
October 11	Nottingham	England	Motorpoint Arena Nottingham	Camryn; Aleem	—N/a	—N/a
October 12	Birmingham	England	Barclaycard Arena	Camryn; Aleem	—N/a	—N/a
October 14	Barcelona	Spain	Sant Jordi Club	Camryn; Aleem	—N/a	—N/a
October 16	Lisbon	Portugal	Campo Pequeno	Camryn; Aleem	—N/a	—N/a
October 18	Paris	France	Zénith Paris	Camryn; Aleem	—N/a	—N/a
October 19	Cologne	Germany	E-Werk	Camryn; Aleem	—N/a	—N/a
October 20	Frankfurt	Germany	Batschkapp	Camryn; Aleem	—N/a	—N/a
October 22	Frederiksberg	Denmark	Falkonersalen	Camryn; Aleem	—N/a	—N/a
October 23	Stockholm	Sweden	Annexet	Camryn; Aleem	—N/a	—N/a
October 24	Oslo	Norway	Sentrum Scene	Camryn; Aleem	—N/a	—N/a
October 26	Esch-sur-Alzette	Luxembourg	Rockhal	Camryn; Aleem	—N/a	—N/a
October 27	Amsterdam	Netherlands	Heineken Music Hall	Camryn; Aleem	—N/a	—N/a
October 29	Antwerp	Belgium	Lotto Arena	Camryn; Aleem	—N/a	—N/a

List of 2017 concerts, showing date, city, country, venue, opening acts, tickets sold, number of available tickets and amount of gross revenue
Date (2017)	City	Country	Venue	Opening acts	Attendance	Revenue
February 18 (Note: The concert on February 18, 2017 at Veterans Memorial Boulevard in Metairie is part of Family Gras.)	Metairie	United States	Veterans Memorial Boulevard	—N/a	—N/a	—N/a
February 20 (Note: The concert on February 20, 2017 at the AT&T Center in San Antonio is part of San Antonio Stock Show & Rodeo.)	San Antonio	United States	AT&T Center	—N/a	—N/a	—N/a
February 25 (Note: The concert on February 25, 2017 at Universal Music Plaza Stage in Orlando is part of Universal Orlando Mardi Gras.)	Orlando	United States	Universal Music Plaza Stage	—N/a	—N/a	—N/a
March 17 (Note: The concert on March 17, 2017 at NRG Stadium in Houston is part of RodeoHouston.)	Houston	United States	NRG Stadium	—N/a	—N/a	—N/a
March 18	Guatemala City	Guatemala	Domo Polideportivo de la CDAG	—N/a	—N/a	—N/a
March 23	Okinawa	Japan	Okinawa Convention Center	—N/a	—N/a	—N/a
March 25 (Note: The concert on March 25, 2017 at Makuhari Messe in Chiba is part of Popspring 2017.)	Chiba	Japan	Makuhari Messe	—N/a	—N/a	—N/a
March 26 (Note: The concert on March 26, 2017 at World Memorial Hall in Kobe is part of Popspring 2017.)	Kobe	Japan	World Memorial Hall	—N/a	—N/a	—N/a
March 29	Shenzhen	China	Shenzhen Bay Sports Center	—N/a	—N/a	—N/a
March 31	Hong Kong		AsiaWorld–Expo	—N/a	—N/a	—N/a
April 1	Taipei	Taiwan	NTU Sports Center	—N/a	—N/a	—N/a
April 5	Pasay	Philippines	Mall of Asia Arena	The Filharmonic	—N/a	—N/a
April 7	Kuala Lumpur	Malaysia	Sunway Lagoon	—N/a	—N/a	—N/a
April 8	Singapore		The Star Performing Arts Centre	—N/a	—N/a	—N/a
Total					61,478 / 67,955 (90%)	$3,263,067

== Canceled shows ==
List of canceled concerts, showing date, city, country, venue and reason for cancelation
Date	City	Country	Venue	Reason
September 13, 2016	Auburn	United States	White River Amphitheatre	Unknown
September 14, 2016	Ridgefield	United States	Sunlight Supply Amphitheater	Unknown
September 16, 2016	San Diego	United States	Cal Coast Credit Union; Open Air Theatre	Unknown
September 17, 2016	Las Vegas	United States	The Joint	Unknown
October 18, 2016	Marseille	France	Le Dôme de Marseille	Unknown
October 19, 2016	Geneva	Switzerland	SEG Geneva Arena	Unknown
October 30, 2016	Zürich	Switzerland	Hallenstadion	Unknown
November 2, 2016	Munich	Germany	Zenith Munich	Unknown
November 3, 2016	Berlin	Germany	Columbiahalle	Unknown
