= All in My Head (Flex) =

2016 single by Fifth Harmony

Single by Fifth Harmony featuring Fetty Wap

from the album 7/27
- Released: May 31, 2016
- Studio: Westlake (Los Angeles); The Hide Out (London, UK); Windmark (Santa Monica, California)
- Genre: Reggae-trap
- Length: 3:30
- Label: Epic; Syco
- Songwriter: Various: Mikkel Eriksen; Tor Hermansen; Benjamin Levin; Willie Maxwell II; Skye Sweetnam; Daystar Peterson; Nolan Lambroza; Julia Michaels; Brian Garcia; Ewart Brown; Clifton Dillon; Richard Foulks; Karla Estrabao; Lauren Jauregui; Normani Kordei Hamilton; Dinah Jane Hansen; Ally Brooke Hernandez; Herbert Harris; Leroy Romans; Lowell Dunbar; Brian Thompson; Handel Tucker
- Producers: Stargate; Garcia

Fifth Harmony singles chronology
"Work from Home" (2016)	"All in My Head (Flex)" (2016)	"That's My Girl" (2016)

Fetty Wap singles chronology
"Wake Up" (2016)	"All in My Head (Flex)" (2016)	"My Environment" (2016)

Music video
- "All in My Head (Flex)" on YouTube

"All in My Head (Flex)" is a song recorded by American girl group Fifth Harmony, featuring guest vocals by American rapper Fetty Wap, for their second studio album, 7/27 (2016), which was released on May 27, 2016. It was produced by Stargate and Brian Garcia with additional production by Sir Nolan. Musically, "All in My Head (Flex)" is a reggae-trap song backed by synths, percussion, and guitar, containing an interpolation of the 1992 song "Flex" by Mad Cobra. The song was released as the second single after a special encore performance on Xfinity following the 2016 Billboard Music Awards on May 22. The single was serviced to rhythmic contemporary radio stations in the United States on May 31.

Commercially, the song reached number eight in New Zealand and number 24 in the United States' Billboard Hot 100. The song also reached the top 40 in Australia, the United Kingdom, Canada and Ireland. To promote the song, the group performed on the season 22 finale of Dancing with the Stars. The song's accompanying music video, set on a tropical beach, was directed by Director X and premiered on the Vevo platform on June 23. "All in My Head (Flex)" won the category Song of Summer at the 2016 MTV Video Music Awards.

== Production and composition ==
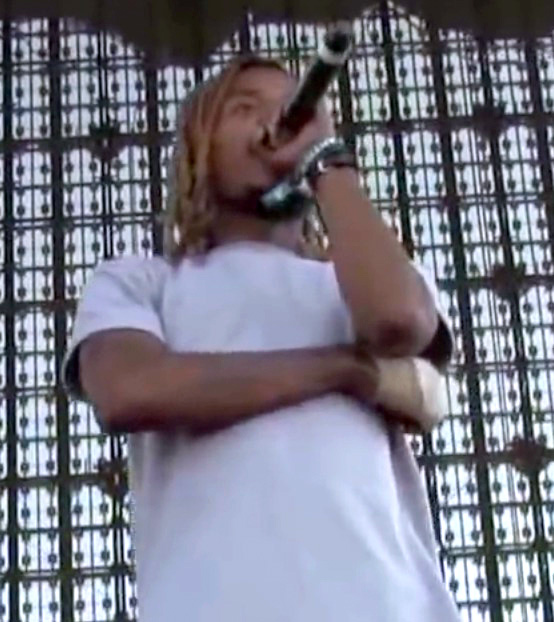
Rapper Fetty Wap (pictured) appears on the song as a featured artist. The line, "I want you to come flex with me, baby" is reminiscent of his own song "Again".

Prior to the release of their second studio album 7/27, Fifth Harmony member Dinah Jane shared her thoughts on her favorite album track "All in My Head (Flex)" on Instagram: "The vibe and rhythm to this I feel represents me best as a South Pacific Islander [...] This is just one of those feel-good songs that you can't help but jam to, no matter where you're at or who you're with!" "All in My Head (Flex)" was written by Fifth Harmony's members, with Stargate, Benny Blanco, Fetty Wap, Tory Lanez, Sir Nolan, Julia Michaels, and Brian Garcia. The song was recorded by Mikkel Storleer Eriksen, Miles Walker and Mike Anderson at Westlake Recording Studios in Los Angeles and Hide Out Studios in London, England. Singer Victoria Monét produced the group's vocals. Mixing was done Phil Tan at the Callanwolde Fine Arts Center with assistance from Daniela Rivera. Eriksen and Hermansen provided all the instrumentation. The group debuted the song during a performance at the 2016 Billboard Music Awards on May 22, 2016. It was released on digital platforms after the performance as an instant gratification track to accompany digital pre-orders of 7/27. The song was serviced to rhythmic format radio stations in the United States on May 31, 2016. and was selected as an impacting song on contemporary hit radio on June 14, 2016.

Musically, "All In My Head (Flex)" is a reggae-trap song. The song is three minutes and thirty-seconds in length and samples the song "Flex" by Jamaican musician Mad Cobra which itself interpolated elements of The Temptations' "Just My Imagination". Its instrumentation consists of guitar, percussion, synthesized Finger snapping snaps and synths. The song opens with Hansen singing the chorus featuring guitar chords and crisp clicks. Following the rap performed by Fetty Wap, Ally Brooke belts out the first verse: "Curtains like waves closing in all around us, dimming the lights just so that they don't blind us," backed by the percussion and guitar chords. Concerning his collaboration on "All in My Head (Flex)", Fetty Wap told Billboard that during the recording, his voice "wasn't as mature as it is now" and described it as "impossible" to perform on stage; "Like, I smoke way too much now. No more high-range. If you were actually to hear the first version to that song, I do not sound anything like that. It was way high up there. So when we changed everything I was like I don't think they going to like it because it felt like I took the energy from it. But they were like we love it, we rocking with it."

== Critical reception ==
Peter Meister of website Sputnikmusic described the song as "sassy and badass, Fetty Wap flexes his muscle with might within the funky, glowing synths crashing with the industrialized percussion which breaks free and explodes at all angles". Digital Spy's Lewis Corner described the song as having an "urban-pop undertone, which is brought to life with light reggae guitar plucks and crisp clicks". Christopher R. Weingarter of Rolling Stone felt that the Caribbean rhythms hinted at in Reflection's track "Them Girls Be Like" "burst forth" in "All In My Head (Flex)" and "Gonna Get Better". USA Today's Maeve McDermott gave the song a positive review writing: "With reggae upstrokes, a swaggering chorus and a welcome Fetty Wap feature, "All In My Head" is summertime in a song."

Describing the song as "reggaeton-inflected" the Los Angeles Times Gerrick D. Kennedy believed that "All In My Head (Flex)", as well as another 7/27 track, "Not That Kinda Girl," "are the album's most infectious offerings". Spin's editor, Brian Josephs, complimented the song's reggae production and the group's sensual performance; however, he had a negative view of Fetty Wap's appearance commenting that the rapper "fails to come off here as much more than Default Guest Rapper". However, Spencer Kornhaber of The Atlantic felt that "All In My Head (Flex) brings in the most exuberant rapper of our times, Fetty Wap, to very catchy effect."

== Commercial performance ==
"All in My Head (Flex)" debuted at number 78 on the US Billboard Hot 100 chart dated July 9, 2016, and in the same week the song climbed from the number 32 to the number 26 on the Mainstream Top 40. Following the release of its accompanying music video, the song rose from number 78 to number 40 on the Hot 100 prompted by a 115% sales increase with 17,000 downloads sold. In its new position, the song had a radio audience of 24 million - a 42% increase, and it also debuted at number 32 on the Streaming Songs chart with 7.1 million streams in the United States (up 112% percent). For the week ending August 6, 2016, the song climbed from number 37 to number 29 on the Hot 100, giving the group its third top 30 song. The song peaked at number 24 on the chart dated August 20, 2016. It has sold over 1 million equivalent units in the United States and has been certified platinum by the Recording Industry Association of America.

The song debuted at number 42 on the Canadian Hot 100 chart for the week ending July 16, 2016. In its ninth charting week, the song jumped one position peaking at 21 on the chart. In Australia, it entered the ARIA Singles Chart at number 66 on the chart dated June 4, 2016, and peaked at number 19 on the chart. The song debuted at number 35 on the New Zealand Singles Chart for the week ending June 20, 2016, and peaked at number 8. It debuted at number 82 on the United Kingdom's Official Singles Chart issued for July 8, 2016, and peaked number 25.

== Music video ==
=== Background ===
The music video, directed by Director X, was filmed in Malibu, California on May 17, 2016. Critics commented on the summer scenery of the video. Gil Kaufman from Billboard said that the group is "dancing and serving up their best surfside poses while singing the reggae-tinged song on a picturesque beach". Commenting on the video's integration of the track's themes, Anna Gaca of Spin wrote the video "takes the song's reggae-tinged vibe to its natural conclusion with a sun-kissed, oceanside party and, naturally, an appearance by guest star Fetty Wap".

=== Synopsis ===
The video, filmed in Malibu, California, drew commentary from critics for its summer visuals and song's matching lyrical content.

The video begins with cinematic black bars expanding to reveal the scenery, which is set in a beach. Individual takes of the girls are shown momentarily as Dinah Jane sings the chorus. The camera shifts to Fetty Wap, who is sitting down in a chair with a guitar next to him. As he sings, the girls are seen dancing in the water, with Lauren Jauregui kicking the water as the video goes into a slow-motion take for less than a second. Several scenes include Normani alone in a rock cliff, a close-up of Dinah singing and a shot of the girls together near the water.

Ally Brooke then sings as she lays in the sand, moving sensually as an attractive man comes out of the water towards her. The camera fades to Lauren, who sings the bridge as she stands next to a background of rocks, as a take of another man is shown. The group is then scattered in different spots standing in a large rock formation, where shots of Dinah alone are spliced as she sings the chorus. Normani shares the chorus, as she sings on top of the rock cliff, shown earlier in the video. Camila Cabello seductively lays down and grabs her hair, in similarity to Ally. Several men approach the girls as they arrive in a convertible Jeep Wrangler. They greet and socialize with each other.

The scene changes to a beach-like bar equipped with cabanas and sand scattered through the floor. Each girl is dressed in beach draps and dance with a man as the scene interchanges with Fetty Wap's rap verse. A product placement for the app Friendable with the group's invitation is shown. The girls perform a dance routine in-sync as Normani and Dinah are shown individually dancing near a rock and on the sand. The video ends with each making a pose as the cinematic black bars close.

== Live performances ==
The group performed the song for the first time on television on May 22, 2016, during a special encore performance on Xfinity following the 2016 Billboard Music Awards, where they also performed "Work from Home". During the show, the group performed wearing white outfits with Cuban flags in the background. On May 24, 2016, the group performed the song on the season 22 finale of Dancing with the Stars on a Carnival-inspired set. The quintet also performed the single on June 13, 2016, on the iHeartRadio Honda Stage in Los Angeles. While promoting in Australia, they performed the song on the Grand Finale of the fifth season of The Voice, and on Sunrise.

== Track listing ==
Digital download – single

1. "All in My Head (Flex)" (featuring Fetty Wap) – 3:30

US CD single

1. "All in My Head (Flex)" (featuring Fetty Wap; super clean) – 3:30
2. "All in My Head (Flex)" (featuring Fetty Wap) – 3:30
3. "All in My Head (Flex)" (no Rap) – 2:53
4. "All in My Head (Flex)" (Instrumental) – 3:30

== Personnel and credits ==
Recording

- Recorded at Westlake Studios (Los Angeles), Windmark Recording (Santa Monica, California) and The Hide Out Studios (London, England)
- Mixed at Callanwolde Fine Arts Center (Atlanta, California)
- Mastered at The Mastering Place (New York City)

Sample

- Contains a portion of the composition "Flex" written by Ewart Brown, Clifton Dillon, Richard Foulks, Herbert Harris, Daniel Gonzalez and Handel Tucker and performed by Mad Cobra

Personnel

- Mikkel Storleer Eriksen – production, instrumentation, recording
- Tor Erik Hermansen – production, instrumentation
- Willie Maxwell – featured artist, songwriter
- Brian Garcia – production
- Victoria Monét – vocal production
- Ally Brooke – vocals
- Camila Cabello – vocals
- Dinah Jane Hansen – vocals
- Lauren Jauregui – vocals
- Normani – vocals
- Mike Anderson – recording
- Miles Walker – recording
- Phil Tan – mixing
- Daniela Rivera – mixing assistant
- Jason Golberg – recording assistant
- Dave Kutch – mastering

Credits adapted from 7/27's liner notes.

== Charts ==
=== Weekly charts ===
Weekly chart performance for "All in My Head (Flex)"
Chart (2016–2017)	Peak position
Australia (ARIA)	19
Belgium (Ultratop 50 Flanders)	46
Belgium (Ultratip Bubbling Under Wallonia)	13
Canada Hot 100 (Billboard)	21
Canada CHR/Top 40 (Billboard)	14
Canada Hot AC (Billboard)	40
Czech Republic Airplay (ČNS IFPI)	47
Czech Republic Singles Digital (ČNS IFPI)	43
Hungary (Rádiós Top 40)	9
Ireland (IRMA)	27
Italy (FIMI)	66
Japan Hot 100 (Billboard)	98
Netherlands (Dutch Top 40)	24
Netherlands (Single Top 100)	42
New Zealand (Recorded Music NZ)	8
Portugal (AFP)	47
Scottish Singles Sales (Official Charts)	25
Slovakia Airplay (ČNS IFPI)	67
Slovakia Singles Digital (ČNS IFPI)	50
Spain (PROMUSICAE)	90
Sweden Heatseeker (Sverigetopplistan)	4
UK Singles (Official Charts)	25
US Billboard Hot 100	24
US Adult Pop Airplay (Billboard)	40
US Dance Club Songs (Billboard)	45
US Dance Airplay (Billboard)	22
US Pop Airplay (Billboard)	11
US Rhythmic Airplay (Billboard)	9

=== Year-end charts ===
2016 year-end chart performance for "All in My Head (Flex)"
Chart (2016)	Position
Australia Urban (ARIA)	15
Canada (Canadian Hot 100)	74
US Billboard Hot 100	93

== Certifications ==
Sales certifications for "All in My Head (Flex)"
Region	Certification	Certified units/sales
Australia (ARIA)	Platinum	70,000^{‡}
Canada (Music Canada)	Platinum	80,000^{‡}
Italy (FIMI)	Gold	25,000^{‡}
Mexico (AMPROFON)	Gold	30,000^{‡}
New Zealand (RMNZ)	2× Platinum	60,000^{‡}
Sweden (GLF)	Gold	20,000^{‡}
United Kingdom (BPI)	Gold	400,000^{‡}
United States (RIAA)	Platinum	1,000,000^{‡}
^{‡} Sales+streaming figures based on certification alone.

== Release history ==
Release dates for "All in My Head (Flex)"
Country	Date	Format	Label	Ref.
United States	May 31, 2016	Rhythmic contemporary	Epic; Syco	
United States	June 14, 2016	Contemporary hit radio	Epic; Syco	
