= Lukas Loules =

German musician (born 1972)

- Also known as: Lukas, Lulou
- Born: Lukas Hilbert; December 23, 1972 (age 53); Hamburg, Germany
- Genres: Pop
- Years active: 1980s–present
- Website: lukasloules.com

Lukas Loules (né Hilbert, born 23 December 1972) is a German songwriter, composer, music producer, and singer. In 2014, he married Katerina Loules and changed his surname from Hilbert to Loules.

== Career ==
Hilbert founded a band called the Future with his brother Kieran when he was 12 years old. They toured Germany until Udo Lindenberg took the brothers into his Panikorchester. At the same time, Lukas and Kieran Hilbert founded a rock band called Hauden & Lukas, and Lukas began writing songs with Lindenberg. He worked on the 1991 Lindenberg album Ich will dich haben, which won a golden disc, before releasing two less-successful solo albums.

He achieved his first notable success as a lyricist when the single "Du mußt ein Schwein sein" performed by Die Prinzen reached the top ten in Germany in 1995. In 1996, he wrote the lyrics for the Blümchen song "Boomerang".

In 1996, Hilbert founded a band called Roh in Hamburg with Carsten Pape and Meik Dobbratz. The band released three albums, in 1996, 1998, and 2000 (Rohmantisch). Following a tour with Peter Maffay, the band split

In 2003, Hilbert produced and sang on the Oli.P singles "Neugeboren" and "Alles ändert sich". Also in 2003, he wrote the lyrics for the Dieter Bohlen production of "Für Dich", sung by Yvonne Catterfeld, which reached number one in the German singles charts.

In December 2004, the single "Was ich an dir mag", on which Hilbert performed as a solo singer, reached number three in the German singles charts. He appeared as a member of the jury in the Popstars TV series, and produced the debut single "Sweetest Poison" of the band Nu Pagadi, which was formed from that series. The single reached number one on the German singles charts. He wrote lyrics and produced the number one album Laut und Leise by Peter Maffay. In January 2005, Hilbert released a solo album with the title Der König bin ich. In 2005, Hilbert performed with Trina with the song "Kommt meine Liebe nicht bei dir an" representing Bremen in the Bundesvision Song Contest 2005, placing 11th with 31 points.

In late 2006, Hilbert wrote the song "Erinner mich Dich zu vergessen", sung by Yvonne Catterfeld, which reached the top ten in Germany. On 3 November 2006, he released the single "Ganze Welt" on which he sang with Katerina Loules, also known as Tryna, who had been a contestant on Popstars. In December 2006, he sang his composition "In Dir Ist Immer Noch Ein Licht", with Peter Maffay, Udo Jürgens, José Carreras, and Piero Masuchett as the opening song at the José Carreras Gala 2006.

In 2008, Hilbert wrote the title track of Peter Maffay's number one album Ewig.

In 2010, Hilbert composed the single "Missing You" for the girl group The Saturdays together with Alexander Kronlund. The single was his first success in the UK and reached number three. It spent three weeks at number one in the radio charts.

In 2011, Hilbert moved to Los Angeles and worked together with the South Korean girl group Wonder Girls. He co-wrote and co-produced their song "Nu Shoes" and the first American release "Like Money" feat. Akon.

In 2012, Hilbert co-wrote and co-produced Carly Rae Jepsen's song "Tonight I'm Getting Over You".

He did the "Hilbert remix" for Taylor Swift's Billboard number one song "We Are Never Ever Getting Back Together".

In 2012, Hilbert co-wrote the Kesha song "All That Matters (The Beautiful Life)" with Kesha, Max Martin, Shellback, Savan Kotecha, and Alexander Kronlund.

In 2012, Hilbert co-wrote and produced Chris Brown's single "Nobody's Perfect"

In 2012, Hilbert co-wrote and co-produced Carly Rae Jepsen and Nicki Minaj's song "Tonight I'm Getting Over You".

In 2013, Hilbert co-wrote and produced G.R.L.'s song "Girls Are Always Right".

In 2014, Hilbert married Katerina Loules and changed his name to Lukas Loules. Loules wrote and produced David Guetta's song "Sun Goes Down", which appeared on Guetta's album Listen.

In 2015, Lukas Loules co-wrote and co-produced the Tori Kelly song "Expensive", co-wrote and produced the Adam Lambert song "The Light" co-wrote and produced the Carly Rae Jepsen song "I Didn't Just Come Here to Dance" and co-wrote and co-produced the Tinashe feat. Chris Brown song "Player".

In 2016, Loules produced and co-wrote "Fifth Harmony The Life", a song performed by American girl group Fifth Harmony under his producer name "Lulou". The song is written by Tinashe, Lukas Loules and Alexander Kronlund and vocal produced by Tryna Loules

In 2016, Loules produced and co-wrote "Fifth Harmony That's My Girl", a song performed by American girl group Fifth Harmony under his producer name "Lulou". The song is written by Tinashe, Loules and Alexander Kronlund and vocal produced by Tryna Loules it was released as the 3rd Single of the Album.

In 2016, Loules produced and co-wrote the Daya song "Got The Feeling" under his producer name "Lulou".

In 2017, Loules produced and co-wrote the Era Istrefi and French Montana song "No I Love Yous" under his producer name "Lulou".

In 2017, Loules produced and co-wrote the Tove Lo feat. Daye Jack song "Romantics" as the first ChampionsLeak production team release together with Choukri Gustmann.

In 2017, Loules co-wrote and produced two songs on the Vanessa Mai album Regenbogen which reached No. 1 in the German Album Charts

In 2017, Loules started his project "ChampionsLeak" together with his production partner Choukri. They released the songs "Fuck the Pain Away" "Emotional" and "Happy For You" independently.

In 2018, Loules co-wrote seven songs and produced five songs for the Vanessa Mai album Schlager, which also reached No. 1 on the German Album Charts.

In 2020, Loules co-wrote and produced the Pop Idol Sweden Winner song "Used to me", together with Alexander Kronlund.

== Discography ==
- 1984 - The Future - Isabell Pubertät & Ich bin wie ich bin!
- 1988 - Hauden & Lukas - Kopfhörer
- 1991 - Lukas - Lukas
- 1991 - Udo Lindenberg - Album Ich will Dich haben
- 1992 - Lukas - S.O.S.
- 1992 - Lukas - Astronauten
- 1993 - Lukas - Simsalabim
- 1993 - Lukas - Schenk mir dein Herz
- 1993 - Lukas - Gameboy
- 1994 - Fabian Harloff - Liebe pur
- 1995 - Die Prinzen - Du mußt ein Schwein sein
- 1996 - Blümchen - Boomerang
- 1996 - Fabian Harloff - I Follow You
- 1996 - ROH - Ich möchte nicht mehr mit der KF verwechselt werden
- 1997 - Blümchen - Schmetterlinge
- 1997 - Blümchen - Achterbahn
- 1997 - Roh - Wie krieg ich die Zeit bis zu meiner Beerdigung noch rum
- 1997 - ROH - Onanie ist voll in Ordnung, egal wie alt du bist
- 1998 - Roh - Was viele nicht zu singen wagten
- 1999 - Roh - Rohmantisch album
- 1999 - ROH - Ich liebe dich
- 1996 - Fabian Harloff - I Follow You
- 1999 - Blümchen - Heut ist mein Tag
- 2000 - Blümchen - Denkst du manchmal noch an mich ?
- 2000 - Peter Maffay feat. Roh - Rette mich
- 2000 - ROH - Du brennst immer noch in mir
- 2002 - Big Brother - Ulf Du Bist Das Groesste
- 2002 - Big Brother - Ulf Ich Liebe Das Leben
- 2002 - Big Brother - Hella & Sava Liebst Du Mich
- 2002 - Big Brother - Hella & Sava In Meinen Traeumen
- 2003 - Yvonne Catterfeld - Für Dich
- 2003 - Dogma - In den Himmel fallen
- 2003 - Die Prinzen - Monarchie in Germany
- 2003 - Oli P. feat. Lukas - Alles ändert sich
- 2003 - Oli P. feat. Lukas - Neugeboren
- 2004 - Nu Pagadi - Sweetest Poison
- 2004 - Nu Pagadi - Darkside
- 2004 - Nu Pagadi - Dying Words
- 2004 - Big Brother Allstars - Unser Haus
- 2004 - Dschungel Allstars - Ich bin ein Star - holt mich hier raus!
- 2004 - Lukas Hilbert - Was ich an dir mag
- 2004 - Lukas Hilbert - Weihnachten wär geiler, wär der Weihnachtsmann 'ne Frau
- 2004 - Nu Pagadi - Sweetest Poison
- 2004 - Big Brother Allstars - Unser Haus
- 2004 - Oli P. - Unsterblich
- 2004 - Dschungel Allstars - Ich bin ein Star - holt mich hier raus!
- 2004 - Oli P. - Unsterblich
- 2005 - Lukas & Tryna Hilbert - Kommt meine Liebe nicht bei dir an
- 2005 - Lukas Hilbert - Stell dir vor
- 2005 - Lukas Hilbert - Du bist ich (Title song of the ProSieben series Freunde)
- 2005 - Lukas Hilbert - Der König bin ich
- 2006 - U96 feat. Ben - Vorbei
- 2006 - Yvonne Catterfeld - Erinner mich Dich zu vergessen
- 2006 - U96 feat. Ben - Vorbei
- 2006 - U96 feat. Das Bo feat. Tryna - Put on the Red Light
- 2006 - Lukas & Tryna Hilbert - Ganze Welt
- 2007 - Ben & Kate Hall - Bedingungslos
- 2007 - Lisa Bund - Learn to Love You
- 2007 - Basta - Deutsche
- 2007 - Peter Maffay - Lass es schnein, Wenn der Weihnachtsmann die Grippe kriegt
- 2008 - Christina Stürmer - Träume leben ewig
- 2008 - Alex C. feat Y-ass - Du bist so Porno
- 2008 - Alex C. feat Y-ass - Liebe Zu Dritt
- 2008 - Ben & Kate Hall - 2 Herzen
- 2008 - Truck Stop - Cowboys sterben nicht, Hamburger Wind, Rosa von der Raste
- 2008 - Peter Maffay - Ewig, In dir ist immer noch ein Licht, Wie im Himmel
- 2009 - Sarah Kreuz - If One Bird Sings
- 2010 - Trynamite - Scheiss Männer
- 2010 - Venke Knutson - "Jealous 'Cause I Love You"
- 2010 - The Saturdays - "Missing You"
- 2010 - Black Pony
- 2011 - Wonder Girls - "Nu Shoes"
- 2011 - Encore - "Fun Last Night"
- 2012 - loona - "Policia"
- 2012 - Alex C - "Love In The Morning"
- 2012 - Alex C - "Bis 5 Uhr Am Morgen"
- 2012 - Wonder Girls feat. Akon - "Like Money"
- 2012 - Carly Rae Jepsen - "Tonight I'm Getting Over You"
- 2012 - Ke$ha - "All That Matters (The Beautiful Life)"
- 2012 - Chris Brown - "Nobody's Perfect"
- 2013 - Carly Rae Jepsen feat. Nicki Minaj - "Tonight I'm Getting Over You"
- 2014 - G.R.L. - "Girls Are Always Right"
- 2014 - David Guetta - "Sun Goes Down"
- 2015 - Tori Kelly - "Expensive"
- 2015 - Adam Lambert - "The Light"
- 2015 - Carly Rae Jepsen - "I Didn't Just Come Here to Dance"
- 2015 - Tinashe feat. Chris Brown - "Player"
- 2016 - Fifth Harmony - "The Life"
- 2016 - Fifth Harmony - "That's My Girl"
- 2016 - Daya - "Got The Feeling"
- 2017 - Era Istrefi & French Montana - "No I Love Yous"
- 2017 - Tove Lo Feat. Daye Jack - "Romantics"
- 2020 - Pop Idol Sweden Winner Song - "Used To Me"
