= The Life (Fifth Harmony song) =

Promotional single by Fifth Harmony

from the album 7/27
- Released: March 24, 2016
- Studio: MXM Studios (Los Angeles, CA); Windmark Recording (Santa Monica, CA)
- Genre: EDM
- Length: 3:20
- Label: Epic; Syco
- Songwriters: Tinashe Kachingwe; Lukas Loules; Alexander Kronlund
- Producer: LULOU

"The Life" is a song recorded by American girl group Fifth Harmony from their second studio album, 7/27 (2016). It was released as the record's first promotional single on March 24, 2016. The song was written by singer Tinashe, Alexander Kronlund, and Lukas Hilbert, with Hilbert handling its production. Musically, the recording is of the electronic dance genre featuring elements of tropical house and Eurodance. Critical response to "The Life" was positive, with critics praising its composition.

Lyrically, "The Life" expresses themes of self-love and independence, with the group singing about celebrating the life. The song is also a response to critics who speculated about a possible disbandment of the group. Upon its release, the track charted in the United Kingdom and Scotland, peaking at numbers 97 and 44, respectively, as well as reaching number one on the Billboard Bubbling Under Hot 100 component chart.

== Background and release ==
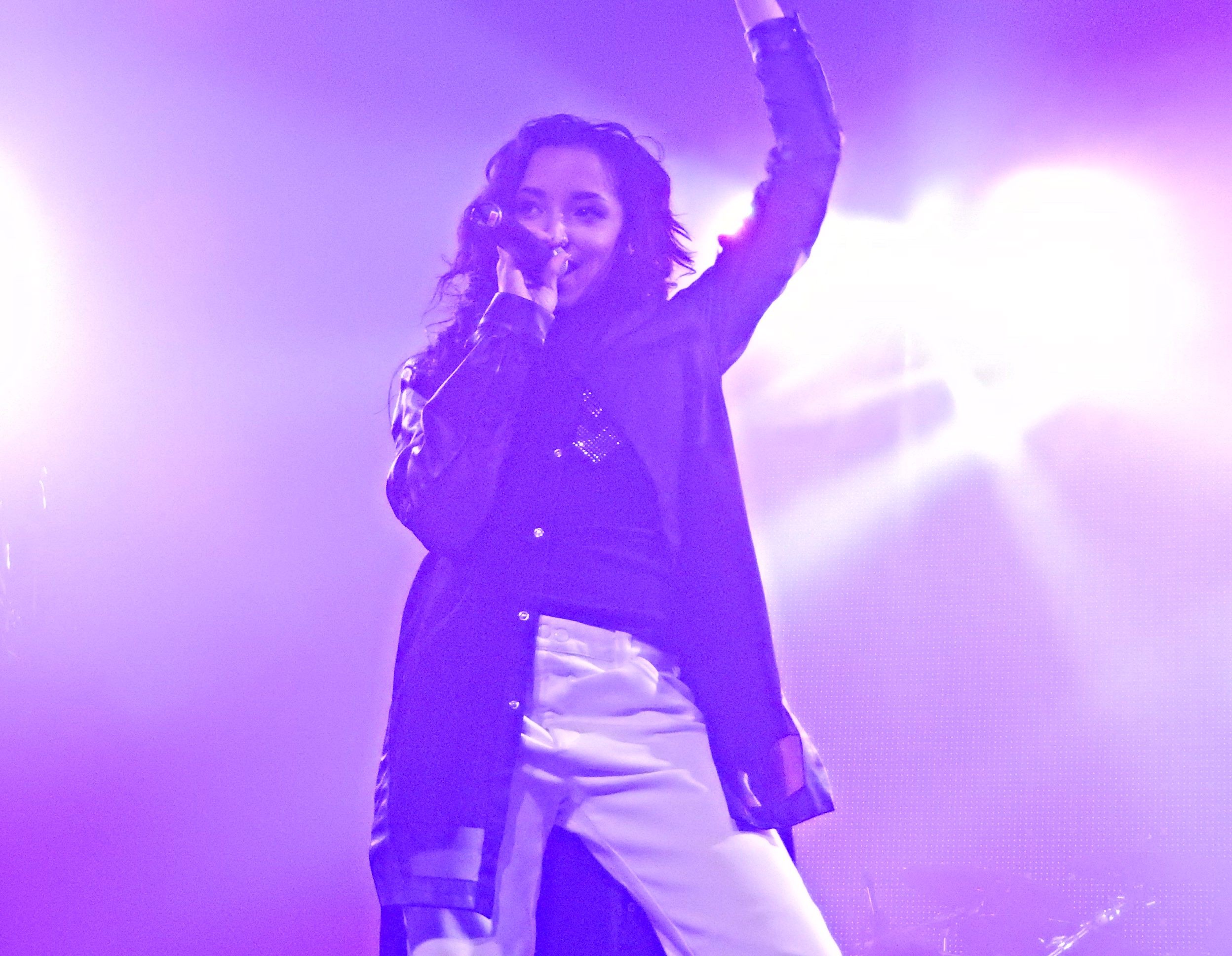
American R&B singer Tinashe (pictured) co-wrote the song.

Fifth Harmony began "working on a more mature sound" for their second studio album 7/27 in early 2015. On December 11, Lauren Jauregui teased "The Life" for the first time during an interview with Spin, in which she also revealed that R&B singer Tinashe was one of the collaborators on the album. Jauregui elaborated on the meaning behind the track, saying that it felt "cohesive" to everyone and drew from the group's "same experience." She went on explaining that "having an authentic sound" and "someone who understands what we're going through" mattered the most to her and her groupmates.

"The Life" was written by Tinashe, Alexander Kronlund, and Lukas Loules, with LULOU handling its production. Sam Holland recorded the song at MXM Studios in Los Angeles; Cory Buce and Jeremy Lertola served as the assistant recording engineers, while additional engineering was performed by Brandon Wood. The group's vocals were recorded by Lukas Loules at the Windmark Recording in Santa Monica with Lukas Loules also contributing with bass, synths and backing vocals. It was mixed at the Mixstar Studios in Los Angeles by Serban Ghenea. "The Life" was released exclusively on streaming service Spotify on March 24, 2016, and serviced as an instant grat track when pre-ordering the album, 7/27, on digital music platform iTunes.

== Composition ==
"The Life"
A 23-second sample of "The Life". An electronic dance song with tropical house elements. Lyrically it discusses celebration and self-care.

Musically, "The Life" is an uptempo song that stylistically incorporates electronic dance music in its production with notable elements from tropical house and Eurodance. Its instrumentation is composed with heavy synths, bassline and distorted vocals in the hook. Lyrically, the song is a celebration of self-love and lifestyle, with Peter Meister from Sputnikmusic commenting that lyrics like "we the best in the biz/breakin' off betting chips" "signify their progression as they recognize their status in music as well as the next phase in their career that they're embarking on." The theme of the song is expressed in lines such as "Give it up for the kids / eating good, getting lit / living life, feeling rich," where they "toast to self-care and preach the importance of living stress-free" as noted by Madeline Roth from MTV. The track features a "spunky mid-tempo number’s chorus" with "auto-tuned vocals".

== Critical reception ==
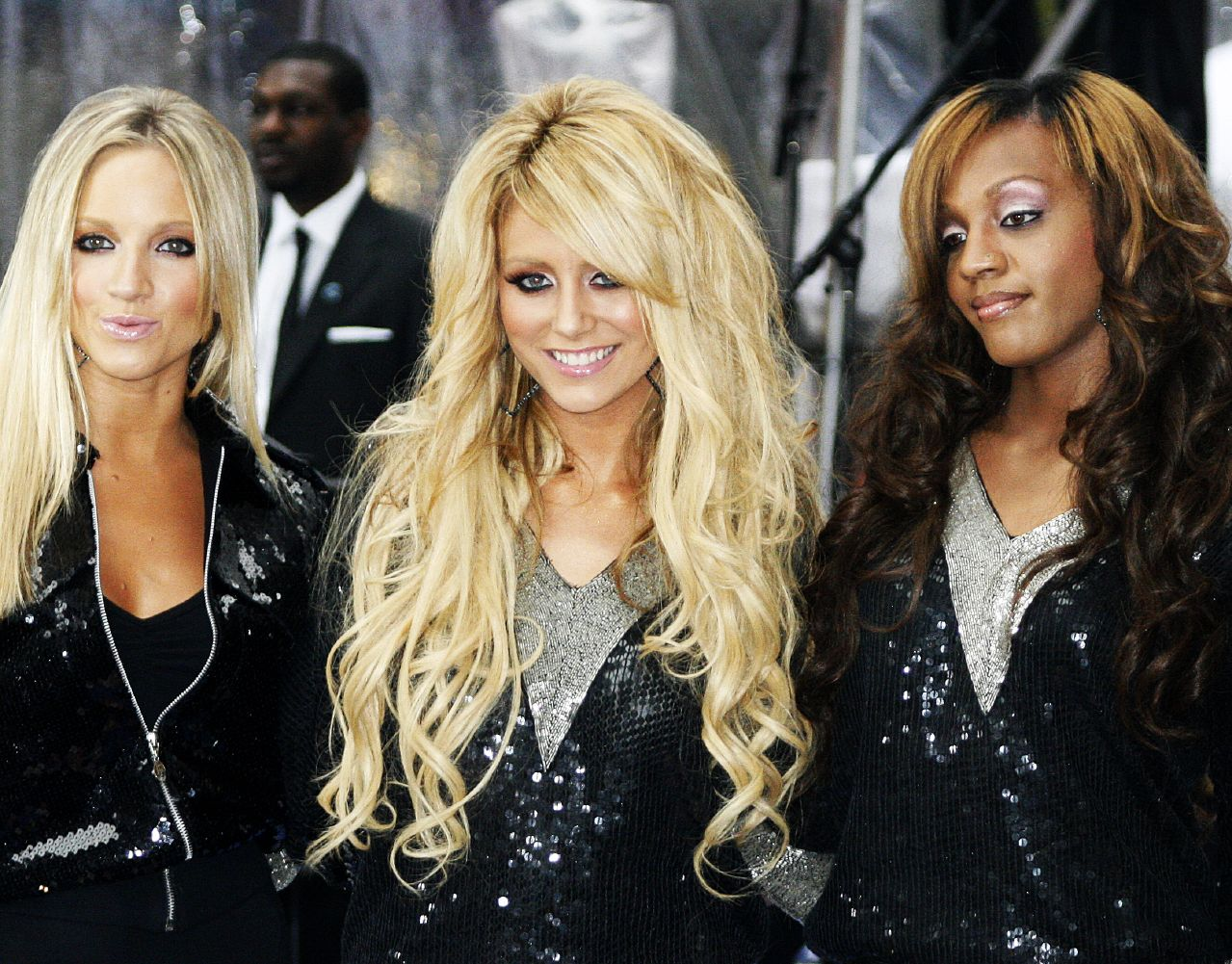
"The Life" was compared to the earlier works of Danity Kane.

Upon its release, "The Life" was met with positive reviews from music critics. Joey Nolfi of Entertainment Weekly called the song a "summer banger", noting its use of "upbeat, danceable production, with a tropically-tinged drop building to a purely-pop chorus." Madeline Roth of MTV, called the song, "a summer anthem in the making", and noted the song's themes of "self-care" and "the importance of living stress-free". Writing for Vulture, Dee Lockett thought "The Life" generates a feeling as if one is "floating on a summer breeze." Lockett continues his review by acknowledging the success of Fifth Harmony's life, saying it is their "God-given right of any young girl group" to live the way they want to live. Lewis Corner and Amy Davidson from British entertainment website Digital Spy, listed the song at number one on their top 10 playlist songs, calling it an "urban bop with an earworm refrain". They also labelled it a "sunny pop number" referring to the summer atmosphere the song has.

In an article published by MTV News, Ira Madison III noted "The Life" features an "increasingly frantic beat" and "the distorted ’90s house vocals on the bridge". He notes similarities from previous work of mid-2000s girl-group Danity Kane. Jessica Hopper raves about the structure of the song and its themes of "earned relaxation and feeling good" about yourself. Hanif Willis-Abdurraqib, echoing the thought of Madison III, note similar "Danity Kane vibes", and highlighted the "production and execution" of the song. He noted the more relaxing atmosphere in the recording, compared to the group's past single, "Work from Home". Simon Vozick-Levinson says the song feels as if it is "all chorus" but "in the best way", and also called the verses "effusive". Levinson, like Willis-Abdurraqib and Hopper, also raves about the stressless environment in "The Life", saying it is the "[b]est use of mai tais as a totem of stressless thriving since Jay sipped one with Ty Ty out in Nevada." Hazel Cills noted that the song does not "have that “pass it off to the next singer” feel", but reaffirms her review by praising the "distorted house vocals", calling the recording a "serious banger".

== Credits and personnel ==
Credits adapted from the liner notes of 7/27.

Recording and management

- Recorded at MXM Studios and Windwark Studios (Los Angeles, California)
- Mixed at MixStar Studios (Virginia Beach, Virginia)
- Mastered at The Mastering Place (New York City, New York)
- Published by Tinashe Kachingwe/Sony/ATV Songs LLC (BMI), MXM — administered by Kobalt — (ASCAP), Hanseatic Musikverlag GMBH & Co. KG

Personnel

- Tinashe Kachingwe – composer
- Alexander Kronlund – composer
- Lukas Loules – composer, producer
- Ally Brooke Hernandez – vocals
- Normani Kordei Hamilton – vocals
- Lauren Jauregui – vocals
- Camila Cabello – vocals
- Dinah Jane Hansen – vocals

== Charts ==
Chart (2016)	Peak position
Portugal (AFP)	80
Scotland Singles (OCC)	44
UK Singles (OCC)	97
US Bubbling Under Hot 100 (Billboard)	1
