= Xfinity Streampix =

Online on demand media streaming service offered by Comcast

Xfinity Streampix is an online on demand media streaming service offered by Comcast that launched on February 23, 2012, with shows from ABC, NBC, Scripps, WildBrain and Lionsgate as well as movies from Sony Pictures, Universal, Snag, Disney and Warner Bros. The service is designed to compete with other online streaming services such as Netflix, Amazon Video, and Hulu.

== See also ==
- Xfinity
- Vudu
