= Work from Home (song) =

2016 song by Fifth Harmony

Single by Fifth Harmony featuring Ty Dolla Sign

from the album 7/27
- Released: February 26, 2016
- Recorded: 2015
- Studio: The Northership (Los Angeles); Windmark (Santa Monica, California); The Hide Out Studios (London)
- Genre: Pop; R&B
- Length: 3:34
- Label: Epic; Syco; Sony
- Songwriters: Daniel Bedingfield; Joshua Coleman; Dallas Koehlke; Jude Demorest; Tyrone Griffin Jr.; Alexander Izquierdo; Brian Lee; Larry Wells Jr.
- Producers: Ammo; DallasK

Fifth Harmony singles chronology
"I'm in Love with a Monster" (2015)	"Work from Home" (2016)	"All in My Head (Flex)" (2016)

Ty Dolla Sign singles chronology
"Wavy" (2016)	"Work from Home" (2016)	"Sucker for Pain" (2016)

Music video
- "Work from Home" on YouTube

"Work from Home" is a song recorded by American girl group Fifth Harmony, featuring American singer Ty Dolla Sign. The song impacted contemporary hit radio four days after its initial release on March 1, 2016, and was released as the lead single from the group's second studio album, 7/27 (2016). "Work from Home" was written by Daniel Bedingfield, Jude Demorest, Eskeerdo, Brian Lee, Ty Dolla Sign, Ammo, and DallasK with production from the latter two. The song is primarily an R&B track that incorporates elements of trap music and tropical house beats with lyrics depicting "work" as a euphemism for sex. Many music publications included it in their lists of best songs of the year.

The song debuted at number 12 on the Billboard Hot 100, and reached number four in its thirteenth week, becoming their highest-charting single in the United States; it surpassed "Worth It", which peaked at number 12. "Work from Home" also became the first top-five single in the country by a girl group in ten years, following the September 2006 peak of "Buttons" by the Pussycat Dolls at number three. Among national airplay charts, the song topped both the Mainstream Top 40 and Rhythmic Songs. Outside the US, the song reached number one in the Netherlands and New Zealand as well as the top ten in twenty additional countries. As of December 2016, the single has sold 1.4 million digital downloads in the United States. The song has achieved multi-platinum certifications in several countries, including quintuple platinum in Canada and the United States and diamond in France and Mexico. Following the outbreak of the COVID-19 pandemic, the song received renewed attention as a result of the increasing adoption and prominence of remote working.

"Work from Home" was accompanied by a music video, directed by Director X and filmed in a construction site of a house. It was released on February 26, 2016, on the group's Vevo channel. The video received commentary from critics over the double entendres in the visuals, which are present in the lyrics as well. The girls are seen interacting with male construction workers and performing choreographed dance routines dressed in construction gear. "Work from Home" won the award for Best Collaboration at the 2016 MTV Video Music Awards and the American Music Awards, winning the group their first award in this network. Its music video reached one billion views in October 2016 and became the most viewed music video of 2016. In August 2025, it reached three billion views.

== Background and release ==
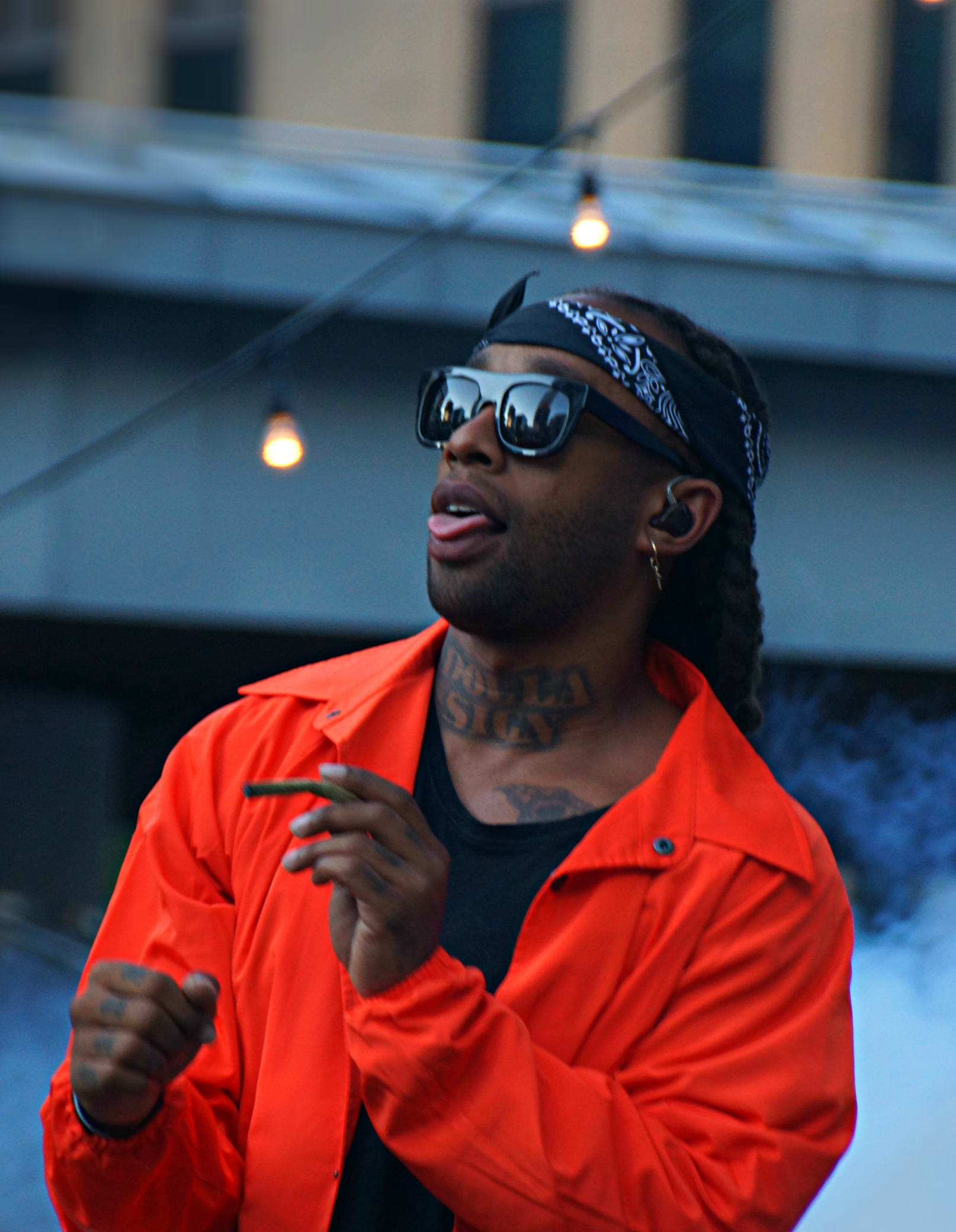
"Work from Home" features a guest appearance from Ty Dolla Sign.

"Work from Home" was initially written by Joshua Coleman with Jude Demorest, Alexander Izquierdo, Dallas Koehlke and Brian Lee. Coleman and Koehlke also produced, performed all instruments and programming for the song. Fifth Harmony's vocals were produced & recorded by Victoria Monét and Andrew Bolooki at Windmark Recording and The Northership, both located in California. The song was mixed by Phil Tan at the Callanwolde Fine Arts Center with assistance from Daniela Rivera. The song came for the group after their A&R Joey Arbagey played it during a meeting to discuss their sophomore album's direction; each member immediately approved of the song. During an interview with Spin, Cabello explained that the group "fell in love" with the song after hearing it mostly for its "laid-back" and "chill" atmosphere that featured "a kind of urban pocket". She explained that the reason she and her groupmates loved the track was because it "branched out in different ways" from anything they had recorded. The song's title was announced on February 24, 2016. Originally titled "Work" and set to be released on January 26, 2016, the group had to re-title the song to "Work from Home" to avoid confusion with Rihanna's song of the same name, which was released a month prior.

While talking about how the collaboration with Ty Dolla Sign came together, Dinah Jane told Billboard that she was "happy he agreed" to be on the track as he was one of her "favorite artists". After hearing his song, "Paranoid", she told her groupmates, "Guys, we gotta get this dude on our song," as she saw him "as a perfect fit" for this track. Jane complimented the way he "rides" the song and "brings a different feel to it". Sharing similar sentiments, Cabello said that he "added [an] amazing flair" to the song. She also praised the way he played the "melody and his dissonant notes," saying that he "made his own hooky part of the bridge." Featured artist Ty Dolla Sign discussed his contribution in the song during a commentary to Billboard where he revealed that he was persuaded to join the song after his 11-year-old daughter continuously played their tracks. He recalls a time where he was on tour and had a lot of girls "in the hotel room". According to Ty, they usually "put on Future or something more turnt" but all of them wanted to "hear Fifth Harmony". He said that was the first time that ever happened. When discussing the album's single choice, Kordei told Entertainment Weekly that the song made sense after releasing "Worth It" because they had "similar styles, but still sounded "different". She elaborates by saying that the song is "chill" and "not too much" while referring to it as "sexy" but "cool" with "something electrifying about it". Nearly a month after the interview took place, the track premiered for the first time on radio on February 26, 2016, on the Elvis Duran and the Morning Show, and was released along with the pre-order of the album. It was then serviced to contemporary hit radio in the United States four days later on March 1, 2016.

== Composition and lyrical interpretation ==
"Work from Home" is a midtempo R&B song with elements of trap music. Katherine St. Asaph of Pitchfork noted elements of Rnbass in its production, while Meaghan Garvey from MTV found tropical house influences on its beats. Discussing the song musically, Chris Martins from Billboard classified it as "a pop-R&B confection that siphons off the a tropically tinted EDM pool." According to the sheet music published by Sony/ATV Music Publishing, "Work from Home" is written in the time signature of common time, with a moderate tempo of 105 beats per minute. It is composed in the key of A♭ major as quintet's voices span the tonal nodes of G_{3} to F_{5}. "Work from Home" follows a chord progression of F_{m}–D♭—A♭.

'Work from Home'
A 22-second sample of "Work from Home" containing the repetitive chorus with electro handclaps, strong bassline and synths.

According with J.C. Pan from The Fader, "Work from Home" uses work as a euphemism for sexual seduction, "rolling out one job-related double entendre after another". In review of the album 7/27, Peter Meister from Sputnikmusic describing the song, wrote, "In the sparkling, sexy "Work from Home", R&B crooner Ty Dolla Sign harmonizes perfectly with the girls amongst brimming, elegant synths that explode and rattle with booming, gritty bass over the demanding of their lover to not go to work but instead, put the "work" at home with her. Its instrumentation, which interpolates the riff of Daniel Bedingfield's 2001 UK garage song "Gotta Get Thru This", is complete with electro claps, strong bassline and backed-synths.

The song has a typical verse-pre-chorus-chorus structure with a rap bridge done by Ty Dolla Sign before the third chorus and the outro. The song begins with bubbling beat and finger snaps. The first verse is sung by Cabello, the first pre-chorus is sung by Kordei. "I know you're always on the night shift/but I can't stand these nights alone", she sings. Following is the chorus sung by Jauregui, with the word "work" repeated seven times after each line. The second verse is sung by Hernandez who sings: "Let's put it into motion / Imma give you a promotion / I'll make it feel like a vacay / Turn the bed into an ocean". Hansen sings the second pre-chorus. Ty Dolla Sign sings after the second chorus, and on the third and final chorus Cabello, Hansen, and Jauregui close the song with an ad-libbed outro.

== Critical reception ==
"Work from Home" received mostly positive reviews from music critics. Matt Collar from AllMusic described "Work from Home" as one of the "most playful tracks" from 7/27, writing that said song along with "Not That Kinda Girl" "build upon Fifth Harmony's knack for mixing juicy R&B hooks with just enough hip-hop muscle to keep things from getting too polite." Maeve McDemortt from USA Today agreed, citing it as a highlight and praising its production. The Boston Globe's writer Maura Johnston called it an "Afternoon Delight", similarly, Brittany Spanks from Rolling Stone described it as "an "Afternoon Delight" for the smartphone generation that fluttered by on minimalist synths." Carolyn Menyes of Music Times gave it a positive review, noting the "chilled out vibe" and the "chorus that cools down the song's momentum rather than pumping it up".

Isabella Biedenhan of Entertainment Weekly wrote that "...slinking beats and playfully sexy lyrics about convincing your partner to skip the boardroom for the bedroom" were notable in the song. The sexual nature and double entendres present in its lyrics, was another point discussed by critics. Spencer Kornhaber from The Atlantic journal noted that "Work from Home" "is typical in portraying freaky bedroom fun as glorious mostly in the bounds of a relationship." Katherine St. Asaph, Pitchfork, expressed an unsatisfied critique about its recording writing that "Fifth Harmony trades in the kind of pop-cultural press-quote feminism where the group can say they are out squash gender roles and “gender-institutionalized thinking” while recording a fantasy of a stay-at-home sexter reassuring the household breadwinner that he's the boss at home."

Several critics noted the song's style is comparable with the musical style of the hip hop producer DJ Mustard. In a review published by the staff of Idolator, Robbie Daw called the track worthy based on previous singles with the titular name a called it the group's "most solid single to date." In a mixed-positive review, Carl Williott initially called the track a "DJ Mustard ripoff" but complimented the group for managing to make the song "their own" with their "subtle harmonizations adding some texture", he adds. Mike Wass shared similar sentiments and called it a "sleek and sexy bop with on-trend production" and an "insidiously catchy chorus" while praising the group's musical evolution. Several publications thought it was a strong contender for song of the summer. However, other critics were not so positive. Christopher Bohlsen of Renowned for Sound gave a negative review, saying that while vocal melodies in the verses were "satisfying", the chorus just "doesn’t sound interesting enough", calling it an "utterly standard pop song". Bohlsen gave the song a two-and-a-half out of five rating.

=== Critics' lists ===
It’s safe to say timesheets and promotions have never sounded this sexy. The premise gets a laugh, but it’s the sound that kept everyone coming back: echoing snaps and claps, tons of space, and vocal lines that threaten to explode into pyrotechnics at a moment’s notice.

— Time editor Jamieson Cox

Several sites, such as Billboard, Rolling Stone, Entertainment Weekly and Time, ranked "Work from Home" in the top ten of their respected best pop songs of the year lists. Slant and NPR ranked the song at number eleven on its list of best singles of the year while Stereogum ranked the song at number fifteen on its year-end list with the editor praising Ty Dolla Sign's influence on the song. Aggregate news site, Inquisitr ranked the song at number two in its top 10 singles list.

In the annual Village Voice's Pazz & Jop mass critics poll of the year's best in music in 2016, "Work from Home" was tied at number 36, with six other songs. The Arizona Republic and The Fader ranked the song at 28 and 23 in their year-end lists, respectively. Fact ranked it at 34 and Spin ranked it at 94. In its best pop singles list, Digital Spy placed the song at number seven. Elle placed the song in its unranked year-end list.

In 2017, Billboard ranked "Work from Home" at number 14 on its list of 100 Greatest Girl Group Songs of All Time: Critics' Picks. In 2019 Rolling Stone ranked the song as the 86th best song of the 2010s decade.

== Chart performance ==
=== North America ===
On the issue dating of March 19, 2016, "Work from Home" debuted at number 12 on the Billboard Hot 100 with 88,000 downloads sold, 10 million United States streams and 20 million radio impressions in its first week, marking the group's highest debut and equaling its best rank for "Worth It", which rose to number 12 in August 2015, twenty-three weeks after it was released. The following week, the song fell four spots to number 16. It would then rise three spots to number 13 and rise one more spot, to match its debut position for the week dated April 9, 2016. The following week, the song would climb two spots to reach a peak at number 10, earning the group their first and only top 10 single in the United States, eventually peaking at number four for the week dated June 11, 2016, where it stayed for two consecutive weeks. Subsequently, they became the first all-female group to chart in the top 10 since "When I Grow Up" by The Pussycat Dolls peaked at number nine in 2008. The single spent a total of 34 weeks on the Hot 100, 15 of which were recorded in the top 10. "Work From Home" would eventually land at number 16 on the Billboard Hot 100 Year-End list for 2016.

It recorded a 6-4 jump on the Digital Songs chart selling 89,000 copies, a 34 percent increase from the previous week. The song also saw an 8-5 jump on Streaming Songs with steams of 14.4 million, a rise of 20 percent and 22-17 leap on the Radio Songs chart, retaining a 49 million audience, a 22 percent increase from the previous week.

For the dated April 23, 2016, the song rose one more spot to number nine, becoming the week's highest airplay gainer retaining an 89 million audience, rising 12 percent from the previous week. The song rose two more spots the following week, leaping from 9–7. It would rise one more spot at a new position at number 6. The following week, it fell one spot, after one of Prince's songs entered the top five shortly after his death. The track would rebound a 7-5 leap, earning the group their first top five entry, marking them as the first all-female group to attain this honor since The Pussycat Dolls' “Buttons” with Snoop Dogg song peaked at number three in 2006. For the week marked May 21, 2016, the track boosted an 8 percent climb at radio and a 10.5 million audience impressions and was aided in the climb with 15.9 million weekly United States streams, which were down one percent. The track would fall one spot after Justin Timberlake’s "Can't Stop the Feeling!" made its hot shot debut at number one. It rose one spot for the week marked June 4, 2016, at number 5, retaining its previous peak position. Following a performance of the track on the Billboard Music Awards, the song leaped 5–4, earning the group their highest entry and peak on the chart. For that week, it recorded a 10-7 jump on Digital Songs, selling 73,000 copies, a 26 percent increase and earned the group their first top five hit on Radio Songs, leaping 6–4 with a 105 million audience, rising 5 percent. On the Streaming Songs chart, the track stayed at number 5 with 15.8 million streams, a decrease of 2 percent.

Additionally, on the chart dated May 21, 2016, "Work from Home" topped the Rhythmic Songs chart, leaping a 2-1 spot and becoming the first girl group to achieve that milestone in 15 years, since Destiny's Child crowned the list in 2001 with "Survivor". On the chart dated June 4, 2016, "Work from Home" topped the Billboard Mainstream Top 40 after climbing a 4-1 position, becoming the first Pop Songs number one by a girl group in nearly 10 years since The Pussycat Dolls led for two weeks in September 2006 with “Buttons” featuring Snoop Dogg. The song is also Ty Dolla Sign's second top 40 entry on the Hot 100. "Work from Home" earned the group their best-selling debut week, surpassing "Boss", which debuted with 75,000 downloads in July 2014. In Canada, "Work from Home" debuted at number 18 on the Canadian Hot 100 after its first week of release. On the week dated April 2, 2016, the song rose 18-14 and then rose two more spots on its third week, reaching the peak of its predecessor "Worth It". Two weeks later, the song climbed 12–8, earning the group their first top 10 entry in this market. It rose one more spot the following week and then rose from 7–5, giving Fifth Harmony their first top five entry as well. Eventually, it climbed to number four in its eleventh week. It also became the group's highest-peaking single in Canada, surpassing the peak of its predecessor, which peaked at number 12 in August 2015. Apart from charting in both Canada and the United States, the song entered two Mexican charts, peaking outside the top ten at number 12 and 11, respectively. As of December 2016, the single has sold 1.4 million copies in the United States. In early 2017, the song was certified quadruple platinum by the Recording Industry Association of America for combined sales and streaming of four million equivalent units.

=== Europe and Oceania ===
In the United Kingdom, "Work from Home" debuted at number 23 on the UK Singles Chart after its first week of release. The following week, it rose 12 spots to reach number eleven. It later rose seven spots to a peak at number four, earning the group their second top ten entry in Britain after "Worth It" peaked number three in July 2015. It rose one spot to number three, where it remained for two consecutive weeks before peaking at number two on the chart behind Mike Posner's "I Took a Pill in Ibiza" during its fifth week, becoming the group's highest-peaking song in Britain, surpassing its predecessor. The song would stay in the top ten for eight additional weeks and in the top 40 for twelve weeks for a total of thirty-seven weeks. As of June 2019, "Work from Home" has sold 1,470,000 copies in the United Kingdom, across physical, download and streaming-equivalent sales.

Simultaneously, the song made an appearance in the charts in the Republic of Ireland, earning the group their first top five there. In the Netherlands, the single debuted at number 29 on the Dutch Top 40 after its first week of release. It climbed for the next three weeks, reaching number four in the fourth week and becoming their first top 10 single in the country. It also became the group's highest-peaking single in the Netherlands, surpassing the peak of its predecessor "Worth It", which peaked at number 25 in August 2015. "Work from Home" eventually topped both the Single Top 100 and the Dutch Top 40, becoming the group's first song to top both charts in the country.

Elsewhere in Europe, the song entered the charts in Austria, where it peaked at number nine and charted for twenty-eight weeks. Similar trends followed in Denmark and Latvia, where the song also peaked at number nine. In the Belgian charts, the song peaked within the top 10 in its Flanders and Wallonia category, earning a top five in the Flanders chart. The track also peaked in the top 10 in Czech Republic, making appearances in both of the country's two main charts. In Germany and Norway, the song peaked at seven and six, respectively and charted for fifteen and twenty-six weeks. "Work from Home" earned a top five in countries such as Spain and Poland, charting for 18 weeks in the Spanish charts. In its digital track component, the song peaked in the top 10 in Slovakia. It also achieved top 10 peaks in Switzerland and the Scandinavian countries of Sweden and Norway, where it also became their highest-charting song in said countries. The song was certified platinum in Denmark, double platinum in countries including Belgium, Italy, Poland, Spain, quadruple platinum in Sweden and Diamond in France, where the single sold a quarter of a million copies.

In Australia, "Work from Home" debuted at number 39 on the ARIA Charts after its first week of release. It climbed to number three in the fourth week, becoming their second top ten and first top five single in the country. The song stayed in the charts for nearly thirty weeks. Since its release, the song has been certified quintuple platinum and has also become one of the best-selling songs by an all-female group there. A similar trend followed in New Zealand where the song debuted at number 21 on the Official New Zealand Music Chart after its first week of release. It climbed to number two in the fifth week, becoming the group's first top-five single in the country. "Work from Home" also became the group's highest-peaking single in New Zealand, surpassing "Miss Movin' On", which peaked at number 27 in July 2013. On April 15, 2016, it became their first number-one single in the country. The single was certified double platinum, becoming the group's best-selling song, after "Worth It" was certified platinum.

== Music video ==
=== Background and development ===
The music video, directed by Director X, was released on February 26, 2016. Speaking on the video's concept, X said that he wanted to incorporate the theme of "work" but "with a different approach." Initially, the setting was going to be in a "corporate office" but the idea was not executed as the group previously released "Worth It" in that same setting. Other ideas included a condominium construction set. He noted the reverse gender roles where the men are "the objects" as "opposed to the other way around" and the many interpretations of work, which he says aided in the song's success.

The video earned the group their third Vevo certification, reaching over 100 million views on March 31, 2016, and becoming one of the fastest videos to reach this milestone. It became the fourth most viewed music video of 2016. It remains the most viewed music video by a girl group followed by "Worth It". As of September 2025, the video has surpassed 3 billion views. It won Best Collaboration on the 2016 MTV Video Music Awards, and also won in the "Song of the Year" category at the 2017 Nickelodeon Kids' Choice Awards.

=== Synopsis ===
The members of Fifth Harmony pose as construction workers. Many critics commented on the group's mature direction they took from their previous videos.

The video begins with a muscular man carrying a half-filled pack of cement. As the man walks, Camila sings while resting her arm in a shovel. Multiple workers are shown working around the area as well. As Camila makes her way towards a tractor, the verse switches to Normani, who is standing on a tractor shovel loader. Normani dances near the tractor, approaching a male worker who is sitting in the driver's seat of the vehicle.

The group is now in front of the construction house, all performing in-sync dance choreography. Some of the dance routines include mimicking the visual to a jackhammer and using a driller. Ally is seen inside the house with a hammer, as she approaches a male construction worker, turning him around by gently grabbing his shirt and flirting with him. In the next scene, Dinah is standing by a wall, and makes her way towards another male worker, opening a blueprint map, and using a tape measure. The scene then shifts to Lauren, who is handling a blow torch.

All the girls are then seen performing dance routines inside the hall of the house, with Lauren in the middle and two girls at each side of the staircase. Ty Dolla Sign appears while singing with a sledgehammer over his shoulders. He is seen for the first time together with the group, leaning against a wall, while the girls dance off-cam and perform twerking moves. The girls are now outside of the house, where night has approached, as each girl performs synchronized dance moves.

=== Reception and analysis ===
Rebecca H. Dolan from the site The Crimson noted that the video "brings women to the forefront of the workplace." And said that the song calls something described as "neo-feminism", she wrote: "we see Fifth Harmony highlighting these concepts of ninth wave feminism, gender spheres, sexual stereotyping, etc. The whole scene takes place on a construction site—blazingly hot from the looks of it!—full of men in hard hats with bulging muscles. The women of Fifth Harmony appear on set as well. Beneath their stunningly tousled tresses, they wear construction chic leotards that are about as appropriate for manual labor, as, well, women."

== Live performances and cover versions ==
The group performed the song for the first time on television on February 29, 2016, on a special after-Oscar's episode on Live! with Kelly and Michael. Recreating the set of the music video, they performed the song on Jimmy Kimmel Live! on March 24, 2016, and on Alan Carr: Chatty Man approximately two weeks later. The group performed the song on The Ellen DeGeneres Show on May 10, dancing in and around a car prop and at the 2016 Billboard Music Awards on May 22 alongside Ty Dolla Sign. Other performances include the 2016 Much Music Video Awards and the 2016 CMT Music Awards, where the group performed the song with country singer Cam, as a mashup with Cam's single, "Mayday".

The track was covered by British singer-songwriter Ed Sheeran in a radio appearance in the United Kingdom. Other artists who covered the song include classical crossover group Clean Bandit with Louisa Johnson at the BBC Radio 1 Live Lounge, where Fifth Harmony also performed the track along with a cover of Elle King's "Ex's & Oh's". Clean Bandit also recorded a mash-up version of the track at the Spotify Studios in New York City. Bebe Rexha gave an acoustic performance at the SiriusXM studios. When asked to comment on the reason for covering the song, Rexha said she loves the song and called it "sexy".

An edited version of the single was performed at the 2017 People's Choice Awards, where the group made their first appearance as a quartet following Camila Cabello's departure in late 2016. The version was altered, leaving bandmate Lauren Jauregui singing what was formerly Cabello's verse, followed by the other three girls singing their verses as normal in black bondage-style outfits. They then ended their performance with a new dance break.

The group performed the song live during the Dallas show of the Jonas20: Greetings from Your Hometown Tour on August 31, 2025, to mark their return after seven-year hiatus as a quartet. While it retains the altered verse where Lauren sang Camila's original verse, but it used elements from "Goodies" during the new dance break where it retained Ty's pre-recorded verse.

== Awards and nominations ==
Year	Ceremony	Award	Result	Ref
2016	American Music Awards	Collaboration of the Year	Won	
2016	MTV Video Music Awards	Best Collaboration	Won	
2016	MTV Video Music Awards Japan	Best Group Video International	Won	
2016	MTV Video Music Awards Japan	Best Pop Video	Nominated	
2016	MTV Video Music Awards Japan	Best Choreography	Nominated	
2016	iHeartRadio Much Music Video Awards	Most Buzzworthy International Artist or Group	Won	
2016	Premios Juventud	Favorite Hit	Nominated	
2016	Teen Choice Awards	Choice Summer Song	Won	
2016	Teen Choice Awards	Choice Song: Group	Nominated	
2017	Japan Gold Disc Award	Song of the Year by Download (International)	Won	
2017	iHeartRadio Music Awards	Best Music Video	Won	
2017	Kids Choice Awards	Best Song	Won	

== Credits and personnel ==
Credits adapted from 7/27's liner notes.

Recording

- Recorded at The Northership (Los Angeles) and Windmark Recording (Santa Monica, California)
- Mixed at Callanwolde Fine Arts Center (Atlanta, Georgia)
- Mastered at The Mastering Place (New York City)

Management

- Published by Each Note Counts / Prescription Songs (ASCAP), Jude Demorest Publishing Designee (BMI), It's Drugs Publishing / Sony ATV (BMI), BMG Gold Songs / AIX Publishing (ASCAP)
- All Rights Managed by BMG Rights Management LLC, Dallas K Music / Freescription Songs (ASCAP) and Warner Chappell (BMI)
- Ty Dolla Sign's participation is courtesy of Atlantic Recording Corporation

Personnel

- Joshua Coleman – songwriter, production
- Jude Demorest – songwriter, vocals
- Alexander Izquierdo – songwriter
- Brian Lee – songwriter
- Tyrone Griffin Jr. – songwriter, vocals
- Dallas Koehlke – songwriter, production
- Ally Brooke Hernandez – vocals
- Normani Kordei Hamilton – vocals
- Lauren Jauregui – lead vocals
- Camila Cabello – vocals
- Dinah Jane Hansen – vocals
- Victoria Monét – vocal production
- Andrew Bolooki – vocal production, engineer
- Dexter Randall – vocal production, engineer
- Gabriella Endacott – production
- Phil Tan – mixing
- Daniela Rivera – mixing assistant

== Charts ==
=== Weekly charts ===
Chart (2016)	Peak position
Australia (ARIA)	3
Austria (Ö3 Austria Top 40)	9
Belgium (Ultratop 50 Flanders)	4
Belgium (Ultratop 50 Wallonia)	6
Brazil (Billboard Hot 100)	64
Canada Hot 100 (Billboard)	4
Canada CHR/Top 40 (Billboard)	1
Canada Hot AC (Billboard)	12
CIS Airplay (TopHit)	38
Czech Republic Airplay (ČNS IFPI)	5
Czech Republic Singles Digital (ČNS IFPI)	7
Denmark (Tracklisten)	9
Europe (Euro Digital Songs)	4
Finland (Suomen virallinen lista)	11
France (SNEP)	17
France Airplay (SNEP)	4
Germany (GfK)	7
Germany (Airplay Chart)	4
Hungary (Rádiós Top 40)	27
Hungary (Single Top 40)	31
Hungary (Stream Top 40)	9
Ireland (IRMA)	3
Israel International Airplay (Media Forest)	7
Italy (FIMI)	18
Japan Hot 100 (Billboard)	16
Lebanon (Lebanese Top 20)	5
Luxembourg Digital Song Sales (Billboard)	7
Mexico Airplay (Billboard)	12
Mexico Inglés (Monitor Latino)	11
Netherlands (Dutch Top 40)	1
Netherlands (Single Top 100)	1
New Zealand (Recorded Music NZ)	1
Norway (VG-lista)	6
Poland Airplay (ZPAV)	3
Poland (Video Chart)	3
Portugal (AFP)	9
Portugal Digital Songs (Billboard)	4
Romania (Airplay 100)	73
Singapore (RIAS)	8
Scottish Singles Sales (Official Charts)	3
South Korea International Chart (Gaon)	27
Slovakia Airplay (ČNS IFPI)	47
Slovakia Singles Digital (ČNS IFPI)	6
South Africa Airplay (EMA)	5
Spain (Promusicae)	18
Sweden (Sverigetopplistan)	8
Switzerland (Schweizer Hitparade)	7
UK Singles (Official Charts)	2
UK Hip Hop/R&B (Official Charts)	1
US Billboard Hot 100	4
US Adult Pop Airplay (Billboard)	18
US Dance Club Songs (Billboard)	25
US Dance Airplay (Billboard)	1
US Pop Airplay (Billboard)	1
US Rhythmic Airplay (Billboard)	1

=== Year-end charts ===
Chart (2016)	Position
Australia (ARIA)	15
Australia Urban (ARIA)	3
Austria (Ö3 Austria Top 40)	38
Belgium (Ultratop Flanders)	22
Belgium (Ultratop Wallonia)	18
Brazil (Brasil Hot 100)	15
Canada (Canadian Hot 100)	12
CIS (Tophit)	168
Denmark (Tracklisten)	34
France (SNEP)	32
Germany (Official German Charts)	30
Italy (FIMI)	39
Japan (Japan Hot 100)	92
Netherlands (Dutch Top 40)	22
Netherlands (Single Top 100)	17
New Zealand (Recorded Music NZ)	16
Poland (ZPAV)	34
Russia Airplay (Tophit)	160
Spain (PROMUSICAE)	48
Sweden (Sverigetopplistan)	32
Switzerland (Schweizer Hitparade)	21
UK Singles (Official Charts Company)	15
US Billboard Hot 100	16
US Dance/Mix Show Airplay (Billboard)	22
US Mainstream Top 40 (Billboard)	15
US Rhythmic (Billboard)	17

Chart (2017)	Position
Brazil (Pro-Música Brasil)	178

== Certifications ==
Certifications for "Work from Home"
Region	Certification	Certified units/sales
Australia (ARIA)	6× Platinum	420,000^{‡}
Austria (IFPI Austria)	Gold	15,000^{‡}
Belgium (BRMA)	2× Platinum	40,000^{‡}
Canada (Music Canada)	5× Platinum	400,000^{‡}
Denmark (IFPI Danmark)	2× Platinum	180,000^{‡}
France (SNEP)	Diamond	233,333^{‡}
Germany (BVMI)	3× Gold	600,000^{‡}
Italy (FIMI)	3× Platinum	150,000^{‡}
Mexico (AMPROFON)	Diamond+Gold	330,000^{‡}
Netherlands (NVPI)	Platinum	30,000^{‡}
New Zealand (RMNZ)	5× Platinum	150,000^{‡}
Poland (ZPAV)	2× Platinum	40,000^{‡}
Portugal (AFP)	Platinum	10,000^{‡}
Spain (Promusicae)	2× Platinum	80,000^{‡}
Sweden (GLF)	4× Platinum	160,000^{‡}
United Kingdom (BPI)	3× Platinum	1,800,000^{‡}
United States (RIAA)	5× Platinum	5,000,000^{‡}
Streaming
Japan (RIAJ)	Platinum	100,000,000^{†}
^{‡} Sales+streaming figures based on certification alone.^{†} Streaming-only figures based on certification alone.

== Radio and release history ==
List of release dates, showing region, release format, and label
Region	Date	Format	Label	Ref.
United States	February 26, 2016	Digital download	Epic; Syco; Sony; Taylor Gang	
United States	March 1, 2016	Contemporary hit radio	Epic	

== See also ==
- List of Dutch Top 40 number-one singles of 2016
- List of number-one singles from the 2010s (New Zealand)
- List of UK R&B Singles Chart number ones of 2016
- List of Billboard Hot 100 top 10 singles in 2016
- List of Billboard Mainstream Top 40 number-one songs of 2016
- List of Billboard Rhythmic number-one songs of the 2010s
