= Atlanta, California =

Unincorporated community in California, United States

Atlanta is an unincorporated community located in San Joaquin County, California. Its elevation is 62 ft (19 m) and is located at 37°48′47″N 121°07′15″W.

Atlanta was established and named in 1866 when Atlanta, Georgia native Lee Wilson arrived at the locale and built a saloon and store. A blacksmith shop was established at the same time by the Averill brothers. The original center of Atlanta was located at Due Road – named after the ranch established by Danish-born Esper Hansen Due that is still in operation today – southeast of today's center. The time of the community's founding corresponds to the transition from ranching to farming in the area, especially the growing of wheat. Though, Hereford cattle were raised in Atlanta until the middle of the 20th century. Dairy cattle are still prevalent in the area as well. Today, the area is still largely agricultural, and consists of almond, walnut, olive, and cherry orchards. Wine grapes, specifically zinfandel and syrah, are also still grown. Wine bottled from the region, specifically red wine, is dark and rich, sharing many of the positive qualities of the wine from neighboring Lodi.

Littlejohns Creek cuts through the northern part of Atlanta, and demarcates a change in soil content. On the north side, the ground is heavy and red, due to iron content. This is typically referred to as 'Stockon Adobe.' On the south side of the creek, there is sandy soil proliferated by 'hard pan.' This 'Fresno Loam' is more apt for high-drainage crops like almonds. This stretch goes far south into bordering Ripon, known as one of the 'almond capitals of the world.'

From Atlanta, looking east one can see the Sierra Nevada mountain ranges, including Pyramid Peak in Tahoe and parts of Yosemite National Park. Looking west, one sees Mount Diablo and Mount Hamilton, site of the Lick Observatory.

The community lies on the historic French Camp Road which runs southeast from Stockton. The road has been in existence since before the 1849 Gold Rush, and was served by the Fisher Stage Lines. It was an early favored route from Stockton along the east side of the San Joaquin Valley, leading to the Heath & Emory's Ferry crossing of the Stanislaus River just east of the present-day town of Oakdale. The road originally began at the head of the French Camp Slough just outside of Stockton which, during winter and spring flooding, was the only way to access Stockton, via ferry. The road itself traversed a section of sandy soil along a high ground route, and so kept well-drained, in contrast to the seas of mud encountered along other nearby roads during the rainy season. Atlanta today mainly falls within the Ripon and Escalon school districts.

== The Zinc House ==
About two miles southeast of Atlanta, at what today is the intersection of Wagener Road and State Route 120, just a block or two east of where French Camp Road meets the same highway, is the site of the historic (and long gone) Zinc House, which marked one of the original nuclei of activity in the vicinity before Atlanta was founded. The Zinc House, owned and managed by the Wagner family, was a stage stop for the Fisher Stage Lines and included a restaurant. The place was named for an original structure that had been constructed entirely of galvanized metal (iron or steel), shipped in pieces around Cape Horn to San Francisco and transported to the site where it was assembled. A public school in Atlanta was later named for the Zinc House: the Zinc House School.

Many of the early pioneers and settlers of the area around Atlanta are buried in the small Atlanta Cemetery, located at the Five Corners at the intersection of Lone Tree, Jack Tone, and French Camp roads.
