= Alexander Kronlund =

Swedish producer and songwriter (born 1971)

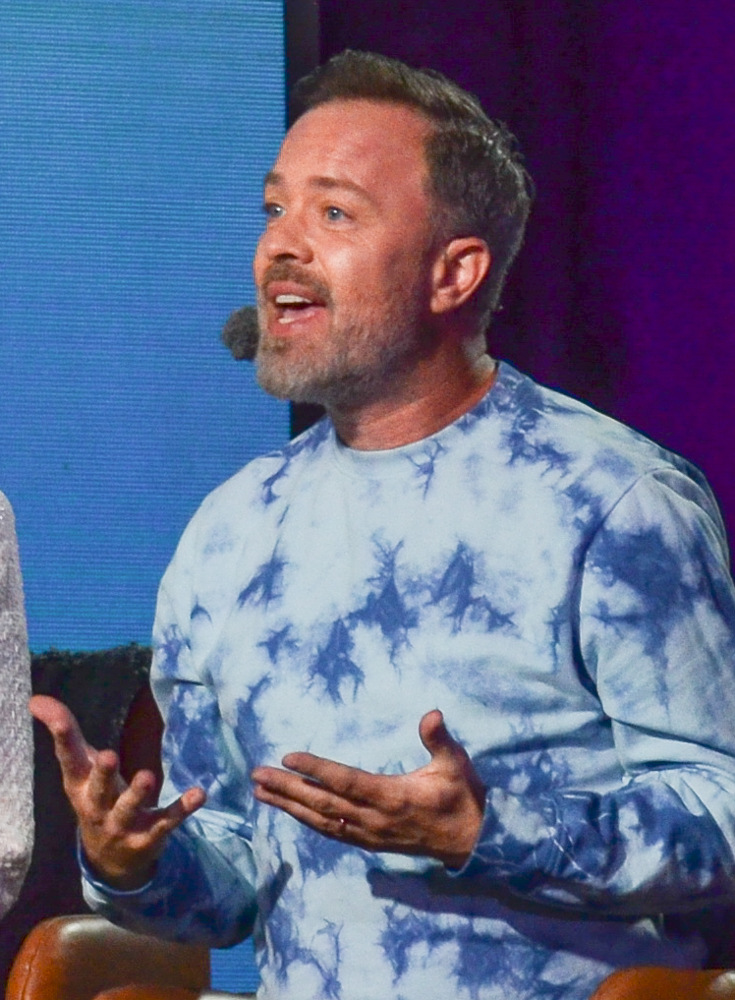
- Kronlund in 2022

Background information
- Born: 10 December 1971 (age 54)
- Genres: Roots reggae, reggae, dancehall
- Occupations: Record producer, songwriter

Alexander Erik Kronlund (born 10 December 1971 in Bredäng) is a Swedish producer and songwriter.

Kronlund co-wrote Meja's million-selling debut album on Sony and co-wrote two songs for Britney Spears' second album, Oops!... I Did It Again. Kronlund co-wrote her hit single, "Lucky", with Max Martin and Rami and also co-wrote "Don't Go Knockin' on My Door". He has also worked with Backstreet Boys, Lesley Roy and *NSYNC and, more recently, Robyn and Lambretta.

Kronlund also co-wrote two songs with Cyndi Lauper for her 2008 album Bring Ya to the Brink. Kronlund also co-wrote the third single from Britney Spears' sixth album, Circus entitled, "If U Seek Amy", and "Till the World Ends", the second single from Femme Fatale, along with Max Martin.

In 2009, a collaboration between Kronlund, the DJ Ali Payami and the teenage Swedish singer Mimmi Sandén happened with the production of the song "Du" ("You" in Swedish). This song was selected by the national broadcaster of Junior Eurovision Song Contest in Sweden, TV4, and Mimmi performed it in the final of Junior Eurovision Song Contest 2009, which took place on 21 November 2009, in Kyiv, Ukraine. He went in to collaborate with Tove Lo.

Kronlund also co-wrote Ariana Grande's 2016 hit song "Side to Side", alongside Grande, Nicki Minaj (who was featured in the song), and two other songwriters, Max Martin and Ilya Salmanzadeh.

Since 2017 he has been a judge on Idol, which is broadcast on TV4.
