= List of Fifth Harmony live performances =

Fifth Harmony live performances
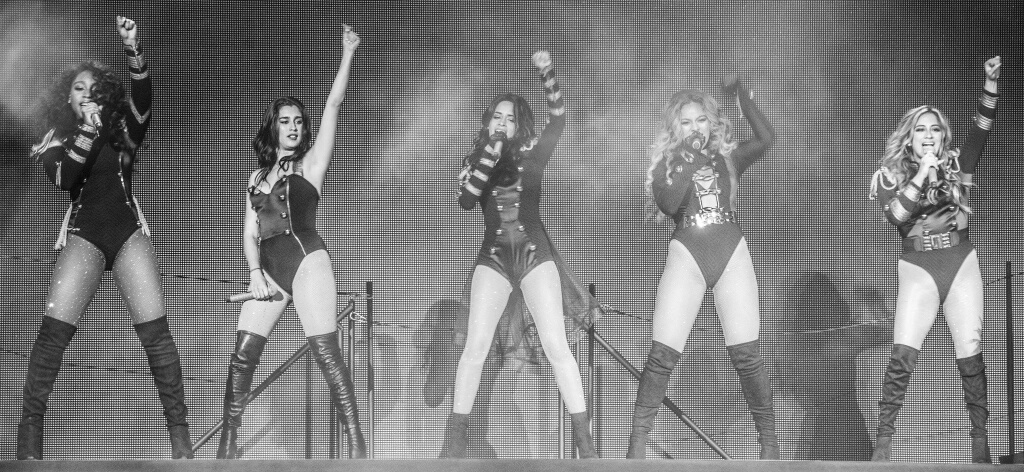
- Fifth Harmony performing on the 7/27 Tour (2016–17); their highest-grossing tour to date.
- Concert tours: 6
- Promotional tours: 1
- Supporting tours: 3
- Award shows: 22
- Television shows and specials: 52
- Music festivals: 88
- One-off concerts: 3
- Benefit events: 3
- Sporting events: 2
- Radio broadcasts: 10
- Web performances: 9
- Other performances: 29

American girl group Fifth Harmony has embarked on several live performances throughout their career, including six headlining concert tours, one promotional tour, and appearances on numerous award shows, television shows, and music festivals.

During July and August 2013, the group embarked on a promotional tour titled Harmonize America, in malls and small venues through North America. In October 2013, they started their debut headlining tour in theatres across North America. Throughout February and July 2014, they embarked on other two concert tours, the Worst Kept Secret Tour and Fifth Times a Charm Tour. All of the tours supported their debut extended play, Better Together (2013). Meanwhile, Fifth Harmony also served as an opening act for Cher Lloyd, Demi Lovato, and Austin Mahone.

In February 2015, after the release of their debut studio album, Reflection (2015), the group commenced their fourth concert tour, the Reflection Tour, and concluded it in February 2016. It visited North America, Europe, and Asia. In June 2016, they embarked on the 7/27 Tour, to promote their second studio album, 7/27 (2016), which visited South America, North America, Europe, and Asia. Its first North American leg grossed US$5.1 million. After member Camila Cabello left the group in December 2016, they continued the tour as a four-piece. Their first performance after her departure was at the 43rd People's Choice Awards, in January 2017. In September 2017, Fifth Harmony began their sixth and final concert tour, PSA Tour, to promote their self-titled third and final studio album (2017). The group announced an indefinite hiatus in March 2018, with their final show being set on May 11, 2018.

== Concert tours ==
=== Headlining ===
Title	Date	Associated album	Continent(s)	Shows	Ref.
2013 tour	October 25, 2013 – November 5, 2013	Better Together	North America	6	
The Worst Kept Secret Tour	February 2, 2014 – March 24, 2014	Better Together	North America	5	
Fifth Times a Charm Tour	May 3, 2014 – July 18, 2014	Better Together	North America	19	
The Reflection Tour	February 27, 2015 – February 12, 2016	Reflection	North America; Europe; Asia	63	
The 7/27 Tour	June 22, 2016 – April 8, 2017	7/27	South America; North America; Europe; Asia	72	
PSA Tour	September 29, 2017 – May 11, 2018	Fifth Harmony	South America; North America; Asia	21	

=== Promotional ===
Title	Date	Associated album	Continent	Shows	Ref.
Harmonize America Tour	July 13, 2013 – August 16, 2013	Better Together	North America	22	

=== Supporting ===
Title	Date	Headliner	Continent(s)	Shows	Ref.
I Wish Tour	September 6, 2013 – September 23, 2013	Cher Lloyd	North America	11	
The Neon Lights Tour	February 9, 2014 – March 30, 2014	Demi Lovato	North America	28	
Live on Tour	July 25, 2014 – October 10, 2014	Austin Mahone	North America; South America	28	

== Award shows ==
List of performances at award shows, with the location and performed songs
Date	Event	Venue	Location	Performed song(s)	Ref.
April 27, 2013	Radio Disney Music Awards	Nokia Theatre	Los Angeles	"Anything Could Happen"	
November 24, 2013	American Music Awards	Nokia Theatre	Los Angeles	"Better Together"	
April 26, 2014	Radio Disney Music Awards	Nokia Theatre	Los Angeles	"Miss Movin' On"	
August 24, 2014	MTV Video Music Awards	The Forum	Inglewood	"Boss"	
November 9, 2014	MTV Europe Music Awards	The SSE Hydro	Glasgow	"Boss"	
April 25, 2015	Radio Disney Music Awards	Nokia Theatre	Los Angeles	"I Wanna Dance with Somebody (Who Loves Me)"/"Worth It"	
July 16, 2015	Premios Juventud	BankUnited Center	Coral Gables	"Worth It"/"Dame Esta Noche" (Note: Spanish version of "Worth It".)	
July 19, 2015	NBPA Players Awards	Rio All Suite Hotel and Casino	Paradise	"Worth It"	
October 25, 2015	MTV Europe Music Awards	Mediolanum Forum	Assago	"Worth It"	
October 28, 2015	Neox Fan Awards	Palacio Municipal de Congresos	Madrid	"Worth It"	
November 19, 2015	Latin Grammy Awards	MGM Grand Garden Arena	Paradise	"Sin Contrato" (with Maluma)	
November 26, 2015	Premios Telehit	Foro Sol	Mexico City	"I'm in Love with a Monster"; "Sledgehammer"; "Worth It"	
December 11, 2015	Billboard Women in Music	Cipriani Wall Street	New York City	"Worth It"/"Independent Women Part I"/"We Are Family"	
May 22, 2016	Billboard Music Awards	T-Mobile Arena	Las Vegas	"Work from Home" (with Ty Dolla Sign); "All in My Head (Flex)" (Note: The transmission of the "All in My Head (Flex)" performance was exclusive for Xfinity viewers.)	
June 8, 2016	CMT Music Awards	Bridgestone Arena	Nashville	"Mayday"/"Work from Home" (with Cam)	
June 19, 2016	iHeartRadio MuchMusic Video Awards	299 Queen Street West	Toronto	"Work from Home"	
November 20, 2016	American Music Awards	Nokia Theatre	Los Angeles	"That's My Girl"	
December 12, 2016	Billboard Women in Music	Cipriani Wall Street	New York City	"Like I'm Gonna Lose You"	
January 18, 2017	People's Choice Awards	Nokia Theatre	Los Angeles	"Work from Home"	
August 22, 2017	Kids' Choice Awards Mexico	Auditorio Nacional	Mexico City	"Más" (Note: Spanish version of their song "Down".); "Work from Home"	
August 27, 2017	MTV Video Music Awards	The Forum	Inglewood	"Angel"; "Down" (with Gucci Mane)	
October 26, 2017	Latin American Music Awards	Dolby Theatre	Los Angeles	"Por Favor" (with Pitbull)	

== Television shows and specials ==
List of performances at television shows and specials, with the country of origin and performed songs
Date	Event	Country	Performed song(s)	Ref.
July 18, 2013	Today	United States	"Miss Movin' On"; "Me & My Girls"	
October 21, 2013	The Arsenio Hall Show	United States	"Miss Movin' On"	
October 22, 2013	Live with Kelly and Michael	United States	"Miss Movin' On"	
October 23, 2013	Big Morning Buzz Live	United States	"Miss Movin' On"	
October 26, 2013	Hub Network's 1st Annual Halloween Bash	United States	"Miss Movin' On"; "Monster Mash"	
November 19, 2013	The X Factor	United States	"Me & My Girls"	
November 22, 2013	The Ellen DeGeneres Show	United States	"Better Together"	
July 11, 2014	Today	United States	"Miss Movin' On"; "Boss"; "Better Together"	
November 12, 2014	Good Morning America	United States	"Sledgehammer"	
December 7, 2014	The X Factor	England	"Boss"	
December 24, 2014	Today	United States	"All I Want for Christmas Is You"	
December 31, 2014	Pitbull's New Year's Revolution 2014	United States	"Boss"; "Sledgehammer"	
February 3, 2015	Today	United States	"Sledgehammer"	
February 5, 2015	The Talk	United States	"Sledgehammer"	
February 17, 2015	Big Morning Buzz Live	United States	"Worth It"; "Reflection"; "Sledgehammer"; "We Know"	
February 19, 2015	Sunrise	Australia	"Sledgehammer"	
February 24, 2015	The Ellen DeGeneres Show	United States	"Sledgehammer"	
April 13, 2015	Live with Kelly and Mark	United States	"Worth It"	
May 19, 2015	Dancing with the Stars	United States	"Worth It"	
May 31, 2015	Britain's Got More Talent	England	"Boss"/"Sledgehammer"/"Like Mariah"/"Worth It"	
June 5, 2015	Good Morning Britain	England	"Worth It"	
June 18, 2015	Jimmy Kimmel Live!	United States	"Worth It" (with Kid Ink); "Boss"	
July 10, 2015	Today	United States	"Worth It"; "Boss"; "Like Mariah"	
September 23, 2015	The Late Late Show with James Corden	United States	"I'm in Love with a Monster"	
December 13, 2015	La Banda	United States	"Worth It"/"Dame Esta Noche" (Note: Spanish version of "Worth It".)	
February 29, 2016	Live with Kelly and Michael	United States	"Work from Home"; "Worth It"	
March 24, 2016	Jimmy Kimmel Live!	United States	"Work from Home"; "Worth It"; "Sledgehammer"; "Boss"	
April 6, 2016	Alan Carr: Chatty Man	England	"Work from Home"	
April 12, 2016	C à vous	France	"Work from Home"	
April 29, 2016	The Ellen DeGeneres Show	United States	"Work from Home"	
May 24, 2016	Dancing with the Stars	United States	"All in My Head (Flex)"	
May 26, 2016	Britain's Got More Talent	England	"Work from Home"	
May 30, 2016	Today	United States	"Worth It"; "Boss"; "Work from Home" (with Ty Dolla Sign); "All in My Head (Flex)"	
July 2, 2016	Caldeirão do Huck	Brazil	"Worth It"; "All in My Head (Flex)"; "Work from Home"	
July 10, 2016	The Voice	Australia	"All in My Head (Flex)"	
July 13, 2016	Sunrise	Australia	"Work from Home"; "All in My Head (Flex)"	
July 28, 2016	Greatest Hits	United States	"Say My Name"/"Independent Women Part I"/"Bootylicious"/"Survivor"	
December 31, 2016	Dick Clark's New Year's Rockin' Eve 2017	United States	"That's My Girl"; "Worth It" (with Kid Ink); "Work from Home" (with Ty Dolla Sign)	
April 10, 2017	Dancing with the Stars	United States	"Impossible"	
June 2, 2017	Good Morning America	United States	"Work from Home" (with Ty Dolla Sign); "Down" (with Gucci Mane); "Worth It"	
July 24, 2017	The Tonight Show Starring Jimmy Fallon	United States	"Down" (with Gucci Mane)	
August 29, 2017	Good Morning America	United States	"He Like That"; "Down"	
September 4, 2017	Sukkiri	Japan	"Down"	
September 8, 2017	Live with Kelly and Ryan	United States	"Deliver"; "He Like That"	
September 12, 2017	The Late Late Show with James Corden	United States	"He Like That"	
October 8, 2017	Domingão do Faustão	Brazil	"Work from Home"; "He Like That"	
October 17, 2017	Total Request Live	United States	"He Like That"; "Don't Say You Love Me"	
November 1, 2017	The Late Late Show with James Corden (Carpool Karaoke)	United States	"Work from Home" (with Sam Smith)	
November 21, 2017	Dancing with the Stars	United States	"Por Favor" (with Pitbull)	
November 30, 2017	The Wonderful World of Disney: Magical Holiday Celebration	United States	"Can You See"	
December 14, 2017	Showtime at the Apollo: Christmas	United States	"Por Favor" (with Pitbull); "Can You See"	
December 25, 2017	Disney Parks Magical Christmas Celebration	United States	"Sleigh Ride"	

== Music festivals ==
List of performances at music festivals, with the location and performed songs
Date	Event	Venue	Location	Performed song(s)	Ref.
July 13, 2013	Common Ground Music Festival 2013	Adado Riverfront Park	Lansing	"Miss Movin' On"; "Stay"; "Tellin' Me"; "Leave My Heart Out of This"; "Red"; "Want U Back"/"With Ur Love"; "They Don't Know About Us"; "Don't Wanna Dance Alone"; "Me & My Girls"	
August 18, 2013	KC101's Ticket to Ride 2013	Six Flags New England	Agawam	"Miss Movin' On"; "Leave My Heart Out of This"; "Stay"; "Tellin' Me"; "Red"; "Don't Wanna Dance Alone"; "Me & My Girls"	
August 21, 2013	KIIS FM's End of Summer Jam 2013	The Chameleon Club	Lancaster	"Miss Movin' On"; "Leave My Heart Out of This"; "Want U Back"; "Tellin' Me"; "Red"; "Don't Wanna Dance Alone"; "Me & My Girls"	
December 2, 2013	KIIS-FM Jingle Ball 2013	American Airlines Center	Dallas	"Miss Movin' On"; "Don't Wanna Dance Alone"; "Red"; "Better Together"; "Me & My Girls"	
December 4, 2013	Q102's Jingle Ball 2013	Wells Fargo Center	Philadelphia	"Miss Movin' On"/"Better Together"/"Me & My Girls"	
December 6, 2013	KIIS-FM Jingle Ball 2013	Staples Center	Los Angeles	"Miss Movin' On"; "Don't Wanna Dance Alone"; "Better Together"; "Me & My Girls"	
December 8, 2013	KBKS's Jingle Ball 2013	Comcast Arena	Everett	"Miss Movin' On"; "Don't Wanna Dance Alone"; "Red"; "Better Together"; "Me & My Girls"	
December 9, 2013	103.5 KISS FM's Jingle Ball 2013	American Airlines Center	Dallas	"Miss Movin' On"; "Don't Wanna Dance Alone"; "Red"; "Better Together"; "Me & My Girls"	
December 10, 2013	KDWB's Jingle Ball 2013	Xcel Energy Center	Saint Paul	"Miss Movin' On"; "Don't Wanna Dance Alone"; "Red"; "Better Together"; "Me & My Girls"	
December 11, 2013	Power 96.1's Jingle Ball 2013	Philips Arena	Atlanta	"Miss Movin' On"; "Don't Wanna Dance Alone"; "Red"; "Better Together"; "Me & My Girls"; "Let It Snow! Let It Snow! Let It Snow!"	
December 12, 2013	KISS 98.5's Kissmas Bash 2013	First Niagara Center	Buffalo	"Miss Movin' On"; "Don't Wanna Dance Alone"; "Red"; "Better Together"; "Me & My Girls"	
December 13, 2013	Z100 Jingle Ball 2013	Madison Square Garden	New York City	"Miss Movin' On"/"Better Together"/"Me & My Girls"	
December 14, 2013	Kiss 108's Jingle Ball 2013	TD Garden	Boston	"Miss Movin' On"; "Don't Wanna Dance Alone"; "Better Together"; "Me & My Girls"	
December 16, 2013	Hot 99.5 Jingle Ball 2013	Verizon Center	Washington, D.C.	"Miss Movin' On"; "Don't Wanna Dance Alone"; "Better Together"; "Me & My Girls"	
December 18, 2013	93.3 FLZ Jingle Ball 2013	Tampa Bay Times Forum	Tampa	"Miss Movin' On"; "Don't Wanna Dance Alone"; "Better Together"; "Me & My Girls"	
December 20, 2013	Y100 Jingle Ball 2013	BB&T Center	Sunrise	"Miss Movin' On"; "Don't Wanna Dance Alone"; "Better Together"; "Me & My Girls"	
May 3, 2014	All-Star Concert Series 2014	Wild Adventures	Valdosta	"Me & My Girls"; "Better Together"; "One Wish"; "Tellin' Me"; "Who Are You"; "Honeymoon Avenue"; "Red"; "Leave My Heart Out of This"; "Independent Women Part I"; "Don't Wanna Dance Alone"; "Miss Movin' On"; "Anything Could Happen"	
May 31, 2014	Kiss Concert 2014	Xfinity Center	Mansfield	"Me & My Girls"; "Better Together"; "Who Are You"; "Don't Wanna Dance Alone"; "Boss" (snippet)	
June 1, 2014	BLI Summer Jam 2014	Jones Beach Theater	Wantagh	"Miss Movin' On"; "Better Together"; "Who Are You"; "Don't Wanna Dance Alone"; "Boss" (snippet)	
June 7, 2014	DigiFest NYC 2014	Citi Field	Queens	"Me & My Girls"; "Better Together"; "One Wish"; "Tellin' Me"; "Who Are You"; "La La La"/"Latch"; "Leave My Heart Out of This"; "Independent Women Part I"; "All of Me"; "Rude"; "Don't Wanna Dance Alone"; "Miss Movin' On"; "Boss" (snippet)	
July 18, 2014	Orange County Fair 2014	Pacific Amphitheatre	Costa Mesa	"Me & My Girls"; "Better Together"; "One Wish"; "Tellin' Me"; "Who Are You"; "La La La"/"Latch"; "Leave My Heart Out of This"; "Independent Women Part I"; "All of Me"; "Rude"; "Don't Wanna Dance Alone"; "Miss Movin' On"; "Boss" (snippet)	
October 11, 2014	Z Festival 2014	NET Live Brasília	Brasília	"Chandelier"; "Miss Movin' On"; "Better Together"; "La La La"/"Latch"; "Rude"; "Don't Wanna Dance Alone"; "Reflection"; "Going Nowhere"; "Who Are You"; "We Know"; "Over"; "All of Me"; "Me & My Girls"; "Them Girls Be Like"; "Boss"	
October 12, 2014	Z Festival 2014	Espaço das Américas	São Paulo	"Chandelier"; "Miss Movin' On"; "Better Together"; "La La La"/"Latch"; "Don't Wanna Dance Alone"; "Reflection"; "Going Nowhere"; "Who Are You"; "We Know"; "Over"; "Me & My Girls"; "Them Girls Be Like"; "Impossible"; "Boss"	
October 19, 2014	Arizona State Fair 2014	Arizona Veterans Memorial Coliseum	Phoenix	"Chandelier"/"Miss Movin' On"; "Better Together"; "La La La"/"Latch"; "Don't Wanna Dance Alone"; "Reflection"; "Going Nowhere"; "Who Are You"; "We Know"; "Over"; "All of Me"; "Me & My Girls"; "Them Girls Be Like"; "Boss"	
March 8, 2015	Busch Gardens Food & Wine Festival 2015	Busch Gardens Tampa Bay	Tampa	"Reflection"; "Going Nowhere"; "Sledgehammer"; "Miss Movin' On"; "Better Together"; "Suga Mama"; "Worth It"; "Body Rock"; "Who Are You"; "Take Me to Church"; "We Know"; "We Belong Together"/"Shake It Off"/"Always Be My Baby"; "Like Mariah"; "Everlasting Love"; "Top Down"; "This Is How We Roll"; "Brave Honest Beautiful"; "Boss"	
May 8, 2015	Channel 93.3 Summer Kickoff 2015	Sleep Train Amphitheatre	Chula Vista	"Reflection"; "Miss Movin' On"; "Sledgehammer"; "Boss"; "Worth It"	
May 9, 2015	Wango Tango 2015	StubHub Center	Carson	"Like Mariah"; "Sledgehammer"; "Boss"; "Worth It"	
May 16, 2015	Kiss Concert 2015	Xfinity Center	Mansfield	"Boss"; "Like Mariah"; "Miss Movin' On"; "Sledgehammer"; "Worth It"	
June 6, 2015	Capital FM's Summertime Ball 2015	Wembley Stadium	London	"Worth It"	
June 12, 2015	50th Hawaii State Fair	Aloha Stadium	Honolulu	"Reflection"; "Going Nowhere"; "Miss Movin' On"; "Sledgehammer"; "Better Together"; "We Belong Together"/"Shake It Off"/"Always Be My Baby"; "Like Mariah"; "Boss"; "Worth It"	
June 14, 2015	Los Angeles Pride 2015	West Hollywood Park	West Hollywood	"Reflection"; "Going Nowhere"; "Sledgehammer"; "Miss Movin' On"; "Better Together"; "Suga Mama"; "Worth It"; "Body Rock"; "Who Are You"; "Take Me to Church"; "We Know"; "We Belong Together"/"Shake It Off"/"Always Be My Baby"; "Like Mariah"; "Everlasting Love"; "Top Down"; "This Is How We Roll"; "Brave Honest Beautiful"; "Boss"	
June 20, 2015	B96 Pepsi SummerBash 2015	Toyota Park	Bridgeview	"Boss"; "Going Nowhere"; "Miss Movin' On"; "Sledgehammer"; "Like Mariah"; "Worth It"	
June 23, 2015	San Diego County Fair 2015	Del Mar Fairgrounds	Del Mar	"Reflection"; "Going Nowhere"; "Sledgehammer"; "Miss Movin' On"; "Better Together"; "Suga Mama"; "Body Rock"; "Who Are You"; "Take Me to Church"; "We Know"; "We Belong Together"/"Shake It Off"/"Always Be My Baby"; "Like Mariah"; "Everlasting Love"; "Top Down"; "This Is How We Roll"; "Brave Honest Beautiful"; "Worth It"; "Boss"	
June 28, 2015	Show of the Summer 2015	Hersheypark Stadium	Hershey	"Boss"; "Reflection"; "Going Nowhere"; "Sledgehammer"; "Miss Movin' On"; "Better Together"; "Who Are You"; "We Know"; "We Belong Together"/"Shake It Off"/"Always Be My Baby"; "Like Mariah"; "Everlasting Love"; "This Is How We Roll"; "Worth It"; "Brave Honest Beautiful"	
August 9, 2015	Orange County Fair 2015	Pacific Amphitheatre	Costa Mesa	"Boss"; "Reflection"; "Going Nowhere"; "Miss Movin' On"/"We Will Rock You"/"Bad Blood"/"Bitch Better Have My Money"; "Sledgehammer"; "Suga Mama"; "Them Girls Be Like"; "Top Down"; "Better Together"; "This Is How We Roll"; "Brave Honest Beautiful"; "Like Mariah"; "We Know"; "Who Are You"; "Want to Want Me"/"Dreamlover"/"Can't Feel My Face"/"Don't"/"You Need Me, I Don't Need You"/"Am I Wrong"; "Everlasting Love"; "Worth It"; "Body Rock"	
September 4, 2015	New York State Fair 2015	Chevrolet Court	Syracuse	"Boss"; "Reflection"; "Going Nowhere"; "Miss Movin' On"/"We Will Rock You"/"Bad Blood"/"Bitch Better Have My Money"; "Sledgehammer"; "Suga Mama"; "Them Girls Be Like"; "Top Down"; "Better Together"; "This Is How We Roll"; "Brave Honest Beautiful"; "Like Mariah"; "We Know"; "Who Are You"; "Want to Want Me"/"Dreamlover"/"Can't Feel My Face"/"Don't"/"You Need Me, I Don't Need You"/"Am I Wrong"; "Everlasting Love"; "Worth It"; "Body Rock"	
September 5, 2015	Maryland State Fair 2015	Maryland State Fairgrounds	Timonium	"Boss"; "Reflection"; "Going Nowhere"; "Miss Movin' On"/"We Will Rock You"/"Bad Blood"/"Bitch Better Have My Money"; "Sledgehammer"; "Suga Mama"; "Them Girls Be Like"; "Top Down"; "Better Together"; "This Is How We Roll"; "Brave Honest Beautiful"; "Like Mariah"; "We Know"; "Who Are You"; "Want to Want Me"/"Dreamlover"/"Can't Feel My Face"/"Don't"/"You Need Me, I Don't Need You"/"Am I Wrong"; "Everlasting Love"; "Worth It"	
December 2, 2015	Triple Ho Show 6.0	SAP Center	San Jose	"Boss"; "Reflection"; "Going Nowhere"; "Sledgehammer"; "Miss Movin' On"; "Better Together"; "Like Mariah"; "I'm in Love with a Monster"; "Worth It"	
December 5, 2015	Grand Slam Party Latino 2015	Marlins Park	Miami	"Worth It"	
December 11, 2015	Z100 Jingle Ball 2015	Madison Square Garden	New York City	"Silent Night"; "Boss"; "Sledgehammer"; "Worth It"	
December 16, 2015	103.5 KISS FM's Jingle Ball 2015	Allstate Arena	Rosemont	"Silent Night"; "Boss"; "Sledgehammer"; "Worth It"	
December 17, 2015	Power 96.1's Jingle Ball 2015	Philips Arena	Atlanta	"Silent Night"; "Boss"; "Reflection"; "Sledgehammer"; "Worth It"	
December 18, 2015	Y100 Jingle Ball 2015	BB&T Center	Sunrise	"Silent Night"; "Boss"; "Sledgehammer"; "Worth It"	
February 12, 2016	RedfestDXB 2016	Dubai Media City Amphitheatre	Dubai	"Boss"; "Reflection"; "Going Nowhere"; "Miss Movin' On"/"We Will Rock You"/"Bad Blood"/"Bitch Better Have My Money"; "Sledgehammer"; "Better Together"; "We Know"; "Everlasting Love"; "This Is How We Roll"; "Like Mariah"; "Worth It"	
May 13, 2016	Channel 93.3 Summer Kickoff 2016	Sleep Train Amphitheatre	Chula Vista	"Worth It"; "Boss"; "Sledgehammer"; "Write on Me"; "Going Nowhere"; "Work from Home"	
May 14, 2016	Wango Tango 2016	StubHub Center	Carson	"Worth It"; "Boss"; "Sledgehammer"; "Write on Me"; "Work from Home"	
May 15, 2016	CBS Radio's SPF 2016	Cosmopolitan of Las Vegas	Paradise	"Worth It"; "Boss"; "Sledgehammer"; "Write on Me"; "Going Nowhere"; "Work from Home"	
June 4, 2016	Hot Day South Bay 2016	Redwood Amphitheatre	Santa Clara	"Worth It"; "Boss"; "Sledgehammer"; "Miss Movin' On"; "Write on Me"; "Reflection"; "Going Nowhere"; "All in My Head (Flex)"; "Work from Home"	
June 10, 2016	94.5 PST SummerBash 2016	Mercer County Park	West Windsor	"Worth It"; "Boss"; "Sledgehammer"; "Write on Me"; "All in My Head (Flex)"; "Work from Home"	
June 11, 2016	BLI Summer Jam 2016	Jones Beach Theater	Wantagh	"Worth It"; "Boss"; "Sledgehammer"; "Write on Me"; "All in My Head (Flex)"; "Work from Home"	
June 12, 2016	WKRZ Summer Smash 2016	The Pavilion	Scranton	"Worth It"; "Boss"; "Sledgehammer"; "Write on Me"; "All in My Head (Flex)"; "Work from Home"	
November 29, 2016	106.1 KISS FM's Jingle Ball 2016	American Airlines Center	Dallas	"That's My Girl"; "Boss"; "All in My Head (Flex)"; "Worth It"; "Work from Home"	
December 2, 2016	KIIS FM's Jingle Ball 2016	Staples Center	Los Angeles	"That's My Girl"; "Boss"; "All in My Head (Flex)"; "Worth It"; "Work from Home"	
December 5, 2016	KDWB's Jingle Ball 2016	Xcel Energy Center	Saint Paul	"That's My Girl"; "Boss"; "All in My Head (Flex)"; "Worth It"; "Work from Home"	
December 7, 2016	Q102's Jingle Ball 2016	Wells Fargo Center	Philadelphia	"That's My Girl"; "Boss"; "All in My Head (Flex)"; "Worth It"; "Work from Home"	
December 9, 2016	Z100 Jingle Ball 2016	Madison Square Garden	New York	"That's My Girl"; "All in My Head (Flex)"; "Worth It"; "Work from Home"	
December 10, 2016	B96 Jingle Bash 2016	Allstate Arena	Rosemont	"That's My Girl"; "Boss"; "All in My Head (Flex)"; "Worth It"; "Work from Home"	
December 12, 2016	Hot 99.5 Jingle Ball 2016	Verizon Center	Washington, D.C.	"That's My Girl"; "Boss"; "All in My Head (Flex)"; "Worth It"; "Work from Home"	
December 14, 2016	FunPopFun Festival 2016	Audio	São Paulo	"That's My Girl"; "Miss Movin' On"; "Sledgehammer"; "Reflection"; "This Is How We Roll"; "Scared of Happy"; "Write on Me"; "Dope"; "Squeeze"; "Boss"; "Gonna Get Better"; "Voicemail"/"Worth It"; "Not That Kinda Girl"; "Work from Home"	
December 16, 2016	Power 96.1's Jingle Ball 2016	Philips Arena	Atlanta	"That's My Girl"; "Boss"; "All in My Head (Flex)"; "Worth It"; "Work from Home"	
December 17, 2016	93.3 FLZ Jingle Ball 2016	Amalie Arena	Tampa	"That's My Girl"; "Sledgehammer"; "Boss"; "All in My Head (Flex)"; "Worth It"; "Work from Home"	
December 18, 2016	Y100 Jingle Ball 2016	BB&T Center	Sunrise	"That's My Girl"; "Boss"; "All in My Head (Flex)"; "Worth It"; "Work from Home"	
February 18, 2017	Family Gras 2017	Festival Plaza	Metairie	"That's My Girl"; "Miss Movin' On"; "Sledgehammer"; "Reflection"; "This Is How We Roll"; "Scared of Happy"; "Write on Me"; "I Lied"; "No Way"; "We Know"; "Dope"; "Squeeze"; "Big Bad Wolf; "Boss"; "Not That Kinda Girl"; "All in My Head (Flex)"; "Brave Honest Beautiful"; "You Are My Sunshine"; "Gonna Get Better"; "Voicemail"; "Worth It"; "Work from Home"	
February 20, 2017	San Antonio Stock Show & Rodeo 2017	AT&T Center	San Antonio	"That's My Girl"; "Miss Movin' On"; "Sledgehammer"; "Reflection"; "This Is How We Roll"; "Scared of Happy"; "Write on Me"; "I Lied"; "No Way"; "Big Bad Wolf; "Boss"; "Not That Kinda Girl"; "All in My Head (Flex)"; "Brave Honest Beautiful"; "Gonna Get Better"; "Worth It"; "Work from Home"	
February 25, 2017	Universal Studios' Mardi Gras 2017	Universal Music Plaza Stage	Orlando	"That's My Girl"; "Miss Movin' On"; "Sledgehammer"; "Reflection"; "This Is How We Roll"; "Scared of Happy"; "Write on Me"; "No Way"; "We Know"; "Dope"; "Big Bad Wolf; "Boss"; "Not That Kinda Girl"; "All in My Head (Flex)"; "Brave Honest Beautiful"; "Gonna Get Better"; "Worth It"; "Work from Home"	
March 17, 2017	Houston Rodeo & Livestock Show 2017	NRG Stadium	Houston	"That's My Girl"; "Miss Movin' On"; "Sledgehammer"; "Reflection"; "This Is How We Roll"; "Scared of Happy"; "Write on Me"; "No Way"; "Boss"; "Not That Kinda Girl"; "All in My Head (Flex)"; "Brave Honest Beautiful"; "Gonna Get Better"; "Worth It"; "Work from Home"	
March 18, 2017	Empire Music Festival 2017	Finca El Jocotillo	Villa Canales	"That's My Girl"; "Miss Movin' On"; "Sledgehammer"; "Reflection"; "This Is How We Roll"; "Scared of Happy"; "Write on Me"; "No Way"; "Boss"; "Not That Kinda Girl"; "All in My Head (Flex)"; "Worth It"; "Work from Home"	
March 25, 2017	POPSPRING Tokyo 2017	Makuhari Messe	Chiba	"That's My Girl"; "Miss Movin' On"; "Sledgehammer"; "Reflection"; "This Is How We Roll"; "Scared of Happy"; "Write on Me"; "No Way"; "Dope"; "Squeeze"; "Boss"; "Not That Kinda Girl"; "All in My Head (Flex)"; "Brave Honest Beautiful"; "Gonna Get Better"; "Worth It"; "Work from Home"	
March 26, 2017	POPSPRING Osaka 2017	World Memorial Hall	Kobe	"That's My Girl"; "Miss Movin' On"; "Sledgehammer"; "Reflection"; "This Is How We Roll"; "Scared of Happy"; "Write on Me"; "No Way"; "Dope"; "Squeeze"; "Boss"; "Not That Kinda Girl"; "All in My Head (Flex)"; "Brave Honest Beautiful"; "Gonna Get Better"; "Worth It"; "Work from Home"	
April 28, 2017	Grad Bash 2017	Universal Music Plaza Stage	Orlando	"That's My Girl"; "Miss Movin' On"; "Sledgehammer"; "Reflection"; "This Is How We Roll"; "Scared of Happy"; "Write on Me"; "No Way"; "Dope"; "Squeeze"; "Boss"; "Not That Kinda Girl"; "All in My Head (Flex)"; "Brave Honest Beautiful"; "Gonna Get Better"; "Worth It"; "Work from Home"	
April 29, 2017	Grad Bash 2017	Universal Music Plaza Stage	Orlando	"That's My Girl"; "Miss Movin' On"; "Sledgehammer"; "Reflection"; "This Is How We Roll"; "Scared of Happy"; "Write on Me"; "No Way"; "Dope"; "Squeeze"; "Boss"; "Not That Kinda Girl"; "All in My Head (Flex)"; "Brave Honest Beautiful"; "Gonna Get Better"; "Worth It"; "Work from Home"	
May 14, 2017	KUDL 106.5 Endfest 2017	Raley Field	West Sacramento	"Worth It"; "Reflection"; "That's My Girl"; "Boss"; "Dope"; "All in My Head (Flex)"; "Scared of Happy"; "Not That Kinda Girl"; "Work from Home"	
June 3, 2017	KTUphoria 2017	Jones Beach Theater	Wantagh	"Worth It"; "That's My Girl"; "All in My Head (Flex)"; "Down"; "Work from Home" (with Ty Dolla Sign)	
June 9, 2017	iHeartRadio Pool Party 2017	Fontainebleau Hotel	Miami Beach	"Worth It"; "That's My Girl"; "All in My Head (Flex)"; "Down"; "Work from Home"	
June 17, 2017	Kiss Concert 2017	Xfinity Center	Mansfield	"Worth It"; "That's My Girl"; "All in My Head (Flex)"; "Down"; "Work from Home"	
June 23, 2017	99.5 WZPL Birthday Bash 2017	Indiana Farmers Coliseum	Indianapolis	"Worth It"; "That's My Girl"; "All in My Head (Flex)"; "Down"; "Work from Home"	
July 8, 2017	iHeartRadio WestFest 2017	Shaw Millennium Park	Calgary	"Worth It"; "That's My Girl"; "Reflection"; "All in My Head (Flex)"; "Boss"; "Not That Kinda Girl"; "Down"; "Work from Home"	
September 13, 2017	Spokane County Interstate Fair 2017	Expo Center	Spokane	"Worth It"; "Boss"; "Reflection"; "Scared of Happy"; "This Is How We Roll"; "Sledgehammer"; "Deliver"; "Write on Me"; "No Way"; "We Know"; "Dope"; "Messy"; "Not That Kinda Girl"; "All in My Head (Flex)"; "He Like That"; "Gonna Get Better"; "Down"; "Work from Home"	
September 15, 2017	Los Angeles County Fair 2017	Fairplex	Pomona	"Angel"; "Worth It"; "Boss"; "Reflection"; "That's My Girl"; "Scared of Happy"; "Write on Me"; "This Is How We Roll"; "Sledgehammer"; "Deliver"; "We Know"; "Dope"; "Messy"; "Not That Kinda Girl"; "All in My Head (Flex)"; "He Like That"; "Gonna Get Better"; "Down"; "Work from Home"	
October 7, 2017	VillaMix Festival 2017	Estádio do Morumbi	São Paulo	"Worth It"; "Boss"; "Sauced Up"; "Reflection"; "Deliver"; "Messy"; "Make You Mad"; "Scared of Happy"; "Lonely Night"; "Angel"; "Down"; "All in My Head (Flex); "He Like That"; "Don't Say You Love Me"; "Work from Home"; "Bridges"	
December 2, 2017	Poptopia 2017	SAP Center	San Jose	"He Like That"; "Sleigh Ride"; "All in My Head (Flex); "Angel"; "Down"; "Sledgehammer"; "Worth It"; "Work from Home"	
December 7, 2017	B96 Jingle Bash 2017	Allstate Arena	Rosemont	"Worth It"; "He Like That"; "Angel"; "Don't Say You Love Me"; "Deliver"; "All in My Head (Flex)"; "Down"; "Work from Home"	
December 9, 2017	iHeartRadio Jingle Ball 2017	Air Canada Centre	Toronto	"Worth It"; "He Like That"; "Down"; "Don't Say You Love Me"; "All in My Head (Flex)"; "Angel"; "Work from Home"	
December 10, 2017	Kiss 108's Jingle Ball 2017	TD Garden	Boston	"Worth It"; "He Like That"; "Don't Say You Love Me"; "Angel"; "Down"; "Work from Home"	
December 15, 2017	Power 96.1's Jingle Ball 2017	Philips Arena	Atlanta	"Worth It"; "He Like That"; "Angel"; "Down"; "Work from Home"	
December 17, 2017	Y100 Jingle Ball 2017	BB&T Center	Sunrise	"Worth It"; "He Like That"; "Angel"; "Down"; "Work from Home"	
March 18, 2018	Universal Studios' Mardi Gras 2018	Universal Music Plaza Stage	Orlando	"Worth It"; "Boss"; "Sauced Up"; "Reflection"; "Deliver"; "Messy"; "Make You Mad"; "Scared of Happy"; "Lonely Night"; "Not That Kinda Girl"; "Angel"; "No Way"; "Down"; "All in My Head (Flex); "He Like That"; "Don't Say You Love Me"; "Work from Home"; "Bridges"	

== One-off concerts ==
List of one-off concerts, with the location and performed songs
Date	Venue	Location	Performed song(s)	Ref.
June 18, 2017	The Grand Theater at Foxwoods Resort Casino	Mashantucket	"Worth It"; "That's My Girl"; "Miss Movin' On"; "Sledgehammer"; "Reflection"; "This Is How We Roll"; "Scared of Happy"; "Write on Me"; "No Way"; "We Know"; "Dope"; "Squeeze"; "Boss"; "All in My Head (Flex)"; "Not That Kinda Girl"; "Brave Honest Beautiful"; "Gonna Get Better"; "Down"; "Work from Home"	
July 22, 2017	Dixie Landin'	Baton Rouge	"Worth It"; "That's My Girl"; "Miss Movin' On"; "Sledgehammer"; "Reflection"; "This Is How We Roll"; "Scared of Happy"; "Write on Me"; "No Way"; "We Know"; "Dope"; "Squeeze"; "Boss"; "All in My Head (Flex)"; "Not That Kinda Girl"; "Brave Honest Beautiful"; "Gonna Get Better"; "Down"; "Work from Home"	
July 29, 2017	Forum de Mundo Imperial	Acapulco	"Worth It"; "That's My Girl"; "Miss Movin' On"; "Sledgehammer"; "Reflection"; "This Is How We Roll"; "Scared of Happy"; "Write on Me"; "No Way"; "We Know"; "Dope"; "Squeeze"; "Boss"; "All in My Head (Flex)"; "Not That Kinda Girl"; "Brave Honest Beautiful"; "Gonna Get Better"; "Down"; "Work from Home"	

== Benefit events ==
List of benefit events, showing event names, dates, locations, and songs performed
Date	Event	Venue	Location	Performed song(s)	Ref.
September 2, 2017	RockCorps 2017	Makuhari Messe	Chiba	"Boss"; "Worth It"; "Reflection"; "Scared of Happy"; "This Is How We Roll"; "No Way"; "Messy"; "All in My Head (Flex)"; "He Like That"; "Work from Home"; "Down"	
October 17, 2017	TIDAL X Brooklyn 2017	Barclays Center	Brooklyn	"Work from Home"; "Angel"; "He Like That"; "Down"	
December 12, 2017	Fifth Harmony promotional concert	9:30 Club	Washington, D.C.	"Worth It"; "Boss"; "Sauced Up"; "Deliver"; "Messy"; "Scared of Happy"; "Angel"; "Reflection"; "Down"; "All in My Head (Flex)"; "He Like That"; "Don't Say You Love Me"; "Work from Home"; "Bridges"	

== Sporting events ==
List of performances at sporting events, with the location and performed songs
Date	Event	Venue	Location	Performed song(s)	Ref.
August 24, 2013	18th Arthur Ashe Kids' Day	Arthur Ashe Stadium	United States	"Miss Movin' On"	
April 3, 2016	WrestleMania 32	AT&T Stadium	United States	"America the Beautiful"	

== Radio broadcasts ==
List of radio performances, showing the station/show names, dates, locations, and performed songs
Date	Station/Show	Country	Performed song(s)	Ref.
September 4, 2013	On Air with Ryan Seacrest	United States	"Miss Movin' On"; "Me & My Girls"	
July 31, 2014	On Air with Ryan Seacrest	United States	"Boss"	
January 22, 2015	On Air with Ryan Seacrest	United States	"Sledgehammer"	
February 2, 2015	SiriusXM	United States	"Sledgehammer"; "They Don't Know About Us"	
February 16, 2015	KIIS 106.5	Australia	"Sledgehammer"; "They Don't Know About Us"	
June 2, 2015	Capital FM	England	"Worth It"; "Love Me like You Do"	
September 23, 2015	On Air with Ryan Seacrest	United States	"Worth It"; "I'm in Love with a Monster"	
April 12, 2016	NRJ	France	"Work from Home"	
April 12, 2016	Fun Radio	France	"Work from Home"	
July 8, 2016	Music Station	Japan	"Work from Home"	

== Web performances ==
List of web performances, with the performed songs
Date	Event	Performed song(s)	Ref.
May 20, 2013	Idolator Sessions	"Red"; "Lego House"	
June 21, 2013	102.7KIISFM's The Weekend Mixtape	"Miss Movin' On"	
November 19, 2013	Billboard Studio Session	"Miss Movin' On"; "Stay"	
July 16, 2014	Idolator Sessions	"Boss"; "We Know"	
July 22, 2014	Billboard Studio Session	"Boss"; "We Know"	
February 17, 2015	Shazam Top 40	"Latch"; "Sledgehammer"	
June 9, 2015	4Music Acoustic Session	"Worth It"; "Boss"	
April 7, 2016	BBC Radio 1's Live Lounge	"Work from Home"; "Ex's & Oh's"	
July 15, 2016	The Edge Acoustic Session	"Worth It"; "Boss"; "Sledgehammer"; "Write on Me"; "All in My Head (Flex)"; "Work from Home"	

== Other performances ==
List of performances at other events, with the location and performed songs
Date	Event	Venue	Location	Performed song(s)	Ref.
July 25, 2013	XL106.7 pocket show	RP Funding Center	Lakeland	"Miss Movin' On"; "Me & My Girls"; "Red"	
September 18, 2013	KDWB Skyroom pocket show	—	—	"Miss Movin' On"; "Royals"; "Me & My Girls"	
October 24, 2013	Better Together promotional concert	iHeartRadio Theater	New York City	"Don't Wanna Dance Alone"; "Better Together"; "Leave My Heart Out of This"; "Miss Movin' On"	
November 13, 2013	Better Together promotional concert	Lord & Taylor	New York City	"Mistletoe"; "Better Together"; "Miss Movin' On"; "Have Yourself a Merry Little Christmas"	
December 13, 2013	Z100 & Coca-Cola All Access Lounge	Hammerstein Ballroom	Midtown Manhattan	"Miss Movin' On"; "Royals"; "Better Together"; "Have Yourself a Merry Little Christmas"; "Me & My Girls"	
December 15, 2013	AMP 98.7 Kringle Jingle	The Fillmore Detroit	Detroit	"Miss Movin' On"; "Don't Wanna Dance Alone"; "Red"; "Leave My Heart Out of This"; "Better Together"; "Me & My Girls"	
April 6, 2014	AT&T presents Fifth Harmony Live!	Kay Bailey Hutchison Convention Center	Dallas	"Me & My Girls"; "Better Together"; "One Wish"; "Tellin' Me"; "Who Are You"; "Honeymoon Avenue"; "Leave My Heart Out of This"; "Independent Women Part I"; "Que Bailes Conmigo Hoy"; "Red"; "Anything Could Happen"; "Miss Movin' On"	
August 11, 2014	Fifth Harmony's Wet Seal clothing line launch	Westfield Fashion Square	Los Angeles	"Reflection"; "Boss"	
August 20, 2014	B98.5 pocket show	Seaside Heights	New Jersey	"Chandelier"/"Miss Movin' On"; "Reflection"; "We Know"; "Boss"	
October 31, 2014	96.1 KISS FM Halloween Party	Stage AE	Pittsburgh	"Chandelier"/"Miss Movin' On"; "Better Together"; "Reflection"; "Going Nowhere"; "We Know"; "Over"; "Me & My Girls"; "Boss"	
November 9, 2014	MTV Europe Music Awards Kick Off	Klipsch Amphitheater	Miami	"Boss"; "Reflection"; "Sledgehammer"	
November 22, 2014	American Music Awards's Red Carpet Radio	Nokia Theatre	Los Angeles	"Boss"; "Sledgehammer"	
December 4, 2014	92nd Annual National Christmas Tree Lighting	The Ellipse	Washington, D.C.	"All I Want for Christmas Is You"	
December 10, 2014	AT&T & Google Hangouts fan event	AT&T flagship store at Michigan Avenue	Chicago	"Chandelier"/"Miss Movin' On"; "Reflection"; "Going Nowhere"; "We Know"; "Them Girls Be Like"; "Sledgehammer"; "All I Want for Christmas Is You"; "Boss"	
February 2, 2015	Reflection release party	Webster Hall	New York City	"Miss Movin' On"; "Better Together"; "Reflection"; "Going Nowhere"; "Them Girls Be Like"; "We Know"; "Me & My Girls"; "Boss"; "Sledgehammer"	
February 5, 2015	Reflection promotional concert	iHeartRadio Theater	Burbank	"Miss Movin' On"; "Better Together"; "Reflection"; "Going Nowhere"; "We Know"; "Me & My Girls"; "Boss"; "Them Girls Be Like"; "Sledgehammer"	
February 12, 2015	New York Fashion Week 2015	Lincoln Center	New York City	"Sledgehammer"	
May 30, 2015	Reflection promotional concert	G-A-Y	London	"Boss"; "Reflection"; "Miss Movin' On"; "Sledgehammer"; "We Belong Together"/"Shake It Off"/"Always Be My Baby"; "Like Mariah"; "This Is How We Roll"; "Worth It"	
November 2, 2015	The Sun's "Bizarre"	Brooklyn Bowl	London	"Silent Night"; "Boss"; "Sledgehammer"; "Boss"; "Worth It"	
December 11, 2015	Candie's Winter Bash	Irving Plaza	New York City	"Boss"; "Sledgehammer"; "Worth It"; "Silent Night"	
April 9, 2016	7/27 promotional concert	G-A-Y	London	"Body Rock"; "Work from Home"; "Worth It"; "Sledgehammer"; "Boss"	
May 27, 2016	7/27 release party	Electric Cinema	London	"Worth It"; "Write on Me"; "Work from Home"	
June 6, 2016	7/27 promotional concert	iHeartRadio Theater	Burbank	"Worth It"; "Boss"; "Sledgehammer"; "Ex's & Oh's"; "All in My Head (Flex)"; "Work from Home"	
July 9, 2016	Line Music Express Japan fan event	Line Music	Tokyo	"Worth It"; "All in My Head (Flex)"; "Work from Home"	
July 11, 2016	7/27 promotional concert	iHeartRadio Theatre	Sydney	"Work from Home"; "All in My Head (Flex)"	
July 12, 2016	7/27 promotional concert	Nova's Red Room	Sydney	"Worth It"; "Boss"; "Sledgehammer"; "Write on Me"; "All in My Head (Flex); "Work from Home"	
July 15, 2016	iHeartRadio Concert Chamber 2016	Auckland Town Hall	Auckland	"Worth It"; "Boss"; "Sledgehammer"; "Write on Me"; "All in My Head (Flex)"; "Work from Home"	
August 25, 2017	Fifth Harmony album signing	Space 15 Twenty	Los Angeles	"Down"; "Work from Home"; "Sauced Up"; "Make You Mad"; "He Like That"	
August 26, 2017	Fifth Harmony release party	Union	Los Angeles	"Angel"; "He Like That"; "Make You Mad"; "Sauced Up"; "Deliver"; "Lonely Night"; "Don't Say You Love Me"; "Bridges"	

== Guest appearances ==
List of appearances as featured act, showing main artist, dates, locations, and performed songs
Date	Artist	Event	Location	Performed song(s)	Ref.
August 14, 2015	Taylor Swift	The 1989 World Tour	Santa Clara (Levi's Stadium)	"Worth It" (with Swift)	
October 27, 2017	Enrique Iglesias and Pitbull	Enrique Iglesias and Pitbull Live	Inglewood (The Forum)	"Por Favor" (with Pitbull)	
August 31, 2025	Jonas Brothers	Jonas20: Greetings from Your Hometown Tour	Dallas (Dos Equis Pavilion)	"Worth It"/"Work from Home"	
