= List of awards and nominations received by Fifth Harmony =

Fifth Harmony awards and nominations
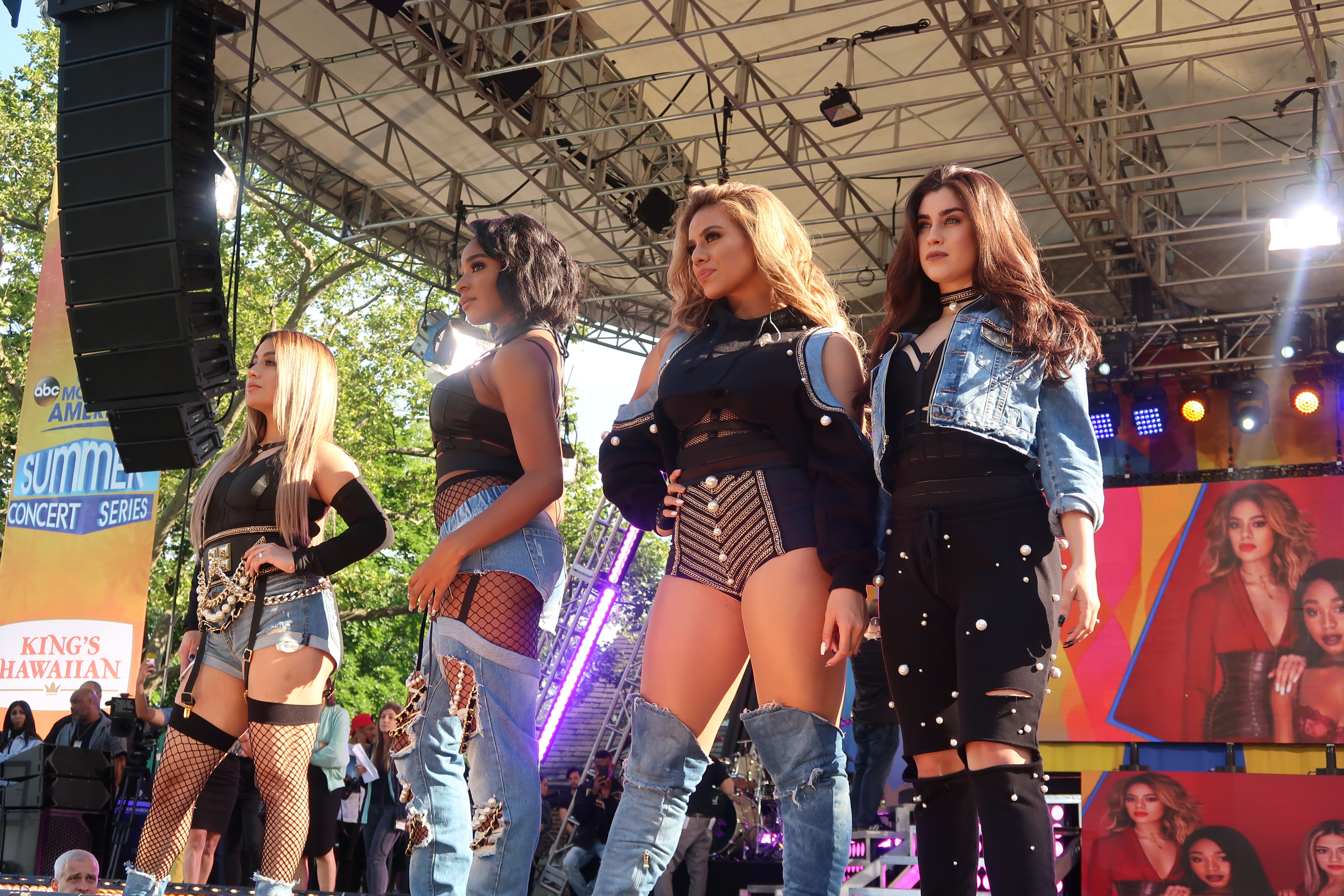
- Fifth Harmony performing as a quartet in 2017
Awards and nominations
Award	Wins	Nominations
American Music Awards	1	1
YouTube Music Awards	1	2
Billboard Women in Music	1	1
Bravo Otto Award	2	2
iHeartRadio Music Awards	4	6
Japan Gold Disc Award	3	3
MTV Europe Music Awards	4	6
MTV Italian Music Awards	1	3
MTV Video Music Awards	4	7
Much Music Video Awards	2	3
Music Choice 100	1	1
Nickelodeon Kids' Choice Awards	5	5
Meus Prêmios Nick	1	2
People's Choice Awards	2	3
Premios Juventud	2	4
Premios Telehit	0	1
Radio Disney Music Awards	8	9
Shorty Awards	1	2
Teen Choice Awards	10	27

Totals (Note: Certain award groups do not simply award one winner. They acknowledge several different recipients, have runners-up, and have third place. Since this is a specific recognition and is different from losing an award, runner-up mentions are considered wins in this award tally. For simplification and to avoid errors, each award in this list has been presumed to have had a prior nomination.)
- Wins: 60
- Nominations: 104

Fifth Harmony is an American four-piece girl group consisting of members Ally Brooke, Normani Kordei, Dinah Jane and Lauren Jauregui. Former member Camila Cabello was part of the group until December 2016.

The group signed a joint recording contract with Simon Cowell's label Syco Records and Epic Records after finishing third in the second season of the American televised singing competition, The X Factor in 2012. After recording a series of covers posted on the video sharing platform, YouTube, the group announced their first extended play, Better Together, spawning the MTV Video Music Award for Artist to Watch winning song, "Miss Movin' On", becoming the first all-female group to win an award in this network since The Pussycat Dolls in 2008.

Reflection, the group's debut studio album, was released in 2015. It spawned three singles—"Boss", "Sledgehammer" and "Worth It", all of which were successful. The third single "Worth It" won their nomination for Song of Summer at the 2015 MTV Video Music Awards. The group's second studio album, 7/27 was released in 2016. The lead single, "Work from Home" became the group's first top 5 hit on the Billboard Hot 100. The song helped Fifth Harmony earn many awards, among them the collaboration category for the American Music Awards. Two of the album's singles, the lead and "All in My Head (Flex)" received an MTV Video Music Award in separate categories.

The group has been included on Billboard's annual "21 under 21 list" since 2013, climbing gradually and eventually topping it in 2016. Fifth Harmony also had three Guinness World Records; two in 2017 and one in 2018.

== American Music Awards ==
The American Music Awards (AMAs) is an annual music awards show created by Dick Clark in 1973.

Year	Nominee / work	Award	Result	Ref.
2016	"Work from Home" (featuring Ty Dolla Sign)	Collaboration of the Year	Won	

== Billboard Women in Music ==
Established in 2007, Billboard Woman of the Year is presented annually at Billboard Women in Music, and honors female contributions to the business, and leadership in embracing the changing music. Other awards to female artists are presented during the ceremony.

Year	Nominee / work	Award	Result	Ref.
2015	Fifth Harmony	Group of the Year	Won	

== Bravo Otto Awards ==
Bravo Otto award is a German accolade honoring excellence of performers in film, television and music. Presented annually since 1957, winners are selected by the readers of Bravo magazine. The award is presented in gold, silver and bronze. Fifth Harmony has won two silver awards from two nominations.

Year	Nominee / work	Award	Result	Ref.
2015	Fifth Harmony	Super-Band	Silver	
2016	Fifth Harmony	Super-Band	Silver	

== British LGBT Awards ==
The British LGBT Awards celebrate the United Kingdom’s most loved LGBT personalities, innovators and companies – dubbed the “Gay Oscars” by the press. Last year, the Awards were the country’s most publicised LGBT event.

Year	Nominee / work	Award	Result	Ref.
2017	Fifth Harmony	Music Artist of the Year	Won	

- Note: Member Lauren Jauregui was awarded in the Celebrity of the Year category in 2017.

== Glamour Awards ==
The Glamour Awards is hosted by Glamour magazine every year to hand out different awards to honor women from a variety of fields, including entertainment, business, sports, music, science, medicine, education, and politics.

Year	Nominee / work	Award	Result	Ref.
2016	Fifth Harmony	Band of the Year	Won	
2017	Fifth Harmony	Best International Act	Nominated	

== Guinness World Records ==
Year the record was awarded, name of the record, and record holder
Year	World record	Record holder	Ref.
2017	Most Twitter engagements (average retweets) for a female group	Fifth Harmony	
2017	Most viewed music video on YouTube by a female group	Fifth Harmony	
2018	Most Nickelodeon Kids' Choice Awards won by a music group	Fifth Harmony	

== iHeartRadio Music Awards ==
The iHeartRadio Music Awards is a music awards show, founded by iHeartRadio in 2014, to recognize the most popular artists and music over the past year as determined by the network's listeners.

Year	Nominee / work	Award	Result	Ref.
2016	"Uptown Funk" (featuring Jasmine V, Jacob Whitesides, and Mahogany Lox)	Best Cover Song	Won	
2016	Harmonizers (Fifth Harmony)	Best Fan Army	Nominated	
2017	Harmonizers (Fifth Harmony)	Best Fan Army	Won	
2017	"Work from Home" (featuring Ty Dolla Sign)	Best Music Video	Won	
2017	"Ex's & Oh's"	Best Cover Song	Won	
2018	Harmonizers (Fifth Harmony)	Best Fan Army	Nominated	

- Note: Ahead of the 2017 ceremony, Zayn was mistakenly given the award for Best Music Video. The following day, the award ultimately went to Fifth Harmony.

== Japan Gold Disc Award ==
The Japan Gold Disc Award is a major music awards show that is held annually in Japan, honoring music sales according to be Recording Industry Association of Japan. Fifth Harmony has won three awards.

Year	Nominee / work	Award	Result	Ref.
2017	Fifth Harmony	New Artist of the Year (International)	Won	
2017	Fifth Harmony	Best 3 New Artists	Won	
2017	"Work from Home" (featuring Ty Dolla Sign)	Song of the Year by Download (International)	Won	

== Melon Music Awards ==
The Melon Music Awards is a major music awards show that is held annually in South Korea. It is known for only calculating digital sales and online votes to judge winners. Fifth Harmony has been nominated once.

Year	Nominee / work	Award	Result	Ref.
2015	"Worth It" (featuring Kid Ink)	Best Pop Song	Nominated	

== MTV Awards ==
=== MTV Europe Music Awards ===
The MTV Europe Music Awards (commonly abbreviated as the EMAs) is an awards show presented by MTV. The award show was established in 1994 by MTV Europe to award the best music videos from European and international artists. Fifth Harmony has won four awards from six nominations.

Year	Nominee / work	Award	Result	Ref.
2014	Fifth Harmony	Best US Act	Won	
2014	Fifth Harmony	Best North America Act	Won	
2014	Fifth Harmony	Best Worldwide Act	Nominated	
2014	Fifth Harmony	Artist on the Rise	Nominated	
2016	Fifth Harmony	Best Pop	Won	
2017	Fifth Harmony	Best US Act	Won	

=== MTV Fandom Awards ===
The MTV Fandom Awards is an awards show presented by mtvU to honor the best fan followings on social media sites. Fifth Harmony have won one award from one nomination.

Year	Nominee / work	Award	Result	Ref.
2015	Harmonizers	Fandom Army of the Year	Won	

=== MTV Video Music Awards ===
The Video Music Awards (commonly abbreviated as the VMAs) is an awards show presented by MTV to honor the best in music videos. Fifth Harmony has won four awards to date.

Year	Nominee / work	Award	Result	Ref.
2014	"Miss Movin' On"	Artist to Watch	Won	
2015	"Worth It" (featuring Kid Ink)	Song of Summer	Nominated	
2016	"Work from Home" (featuring Ty Dolla Sign)	Best Collaboration	Won	
2016	"All in My Head (Flex)" (featuring Fetty Wap)	Song of Summer	Won	
2017	"Down" (featuring Gucci Mane)	Best Pop Video	Won	
2017	"Down" (featuring Gucci Mane)	Best Choreography	Nominated	
2017	"Down" (featuring Gucci Mane)	Song of Summer	Nominated	

=== MTV Italian Music Awards ===
The MTV Music Awards Italy are an annual award ceremony hosted by MTV Italy. The ceremony awards the best video, performers, and artists of the year. Fifth Harmony has won one awards from three nominations.

Year	Nominee / work	Award	Result	Ref.
2015	Fifth Harmony	Best Artist from the World	Nominated	
2016	Harmonizers	Best Fan	Nominated	
2017	Fifth Harmony	Artist Saga	Won	

=== MTV Video Music Awards Japan ===
The MTV Video Music Awards Japan are the Japanese version of the MTV Video Music Awards. Fifth Harmony has won one award from three nominations.

Year	Nominee / work	Award	Result	Ref.
2016	"Work from Home" (featuring Ty Dolla Sign)	Best International Group Video	Won	
2016	"Work from Home" (featuring Ty Dolla Sign)	Best Pop Video	Nominated	
2016	"Work from Home" (featuring Ty Dolla Sign)	Best Choreography	Nominated	

== Much Music Video Awards ==
The Much Music Video Awards (also known as MMVAs) are annual awards presented by the Canadian TV channel Much to honor the year's best music videos. Fifth Harmony has won two awards from three nominations.

Year	Nominee / work	Award	Result	Ref.
2016	Fifth Harmony	Fan Fave International Artist or Group	Won	
2016	Fifth Harmony	iHeartRadio International Duo or Group	Nominated	
2016	Fifth Harmony	Most Buzzworthy International Artist or Group	Won	

== Music Choice 100 ==
Music Choice Play is a music video, lifestyle and entertainment network for Millennials. The network has a series of on-air awards near the end of every year.

Year	Nominee / work	Award	Result	Ref.
2014 (Note: Music Choice did not introduce a category for this award, as it was an honorable award given exclusively to the group.)	Fifth Harmony	Favorite Fandom	Won	

== Myx Music Awards ==
The Myx Music Awards is an annual awards show in the Philippines that honors the year's both Filipino and international music.

Year	Nominee / work	Award	Result	Ref.
2017	Fifth Harmony	Favorite International Video	Nominated	

== Nickelodeon Awards ==
=== Nickelodeon Kids' Choice Awards ===
The Nickelodeon Kids' Choice Awards is an annual awards show that honors the year's biggest television, movie, and music acts as voted by Nickelodeon viewers. Fifth Harmony has won five awards from five nominations.

Year	Nominee / work	Award	Result	Ref.
2015	Fifth Harmony	Favorite New Artist	Won	
2016	Fifth Harmony	Favorite Music Group	Won	
2017	Fifth Harmony	Favorite Music Group	Won	
2017	"Work from Home" (featuring Ty Dolla Sign)	Favorite Song	Won	
2018	Fifth Harmony	Favorite Music Group	Won	

=== Meus Prêmios Nick ===
The Meus Prêmios Nick is an annual awards show that awards entertainers with a blimp trophy, as voted by kids on internet. The show is usually held on October and televised days later.

Year	Nominee / work	Award	Result	Ref.
2016	Fifth Harmony	Favorite International Artist	Won	
2017	"Down" (feat. Gucci Mane)	Favorite International Music Video	Nominated	

== NRJ Music Awards ==
The NRJ Music Awards, created in 2000 by the radio station NRJ in partnership with the television network TF1 takes place every year in mid-January at Cannes (PACA, France) as the opening of MIDEM (Marché international de l'édition musicale). They give out awards to popular musicians by different categories.

Year	Nominee / work	Award	Result	Ref.
2016	Fifth Harmony	International Breakthrough of the Year	Nominated	

== People's Choice Awards ==
The People's Choice Awards is an American awards show, recognizing the people and the work of popular culture, voted on by the general public. Fifth Harmony has won twice.

Year	Nominee / work	Award	Result	Ref.
2015	Fifth Harmony	Favorite Breakout Artist	Nominated	
2016	Fifth Harmony	Favorite Group	Won	
2017	Fifth Harmony	Favorite Group	Won	

== Premios Juventud ==
Premios Juventud is an awards show for Spanish-speaking celebrities in the areas of film, music, sports, fashion, and pop culture, presented by the television network Univision. Fifth Harmony have won two awards from four nominations.

Year	Nominee / work	Award	Result	Ref.
2015	Fifth Harmony	Best Dressed	Won	
2015	"Worth It" (featuring Kid Ink)	Best Performance	Won	
2016	Fifth Harmony	Favorite Tweeter	Nominated	
2016	"Work from Home" (featuring Ty Dolla Sign)	Favorite Hit	Nominated	

== Premios Telehit ==
Premios Telehit is an annual award show run by the Mexican music channel Telehit. The ceremony awards artists of the year. Fifth Harmony has won one award from two nominations.

Year	Nominee / work	Award	Result	Ref.
2015	Fifth Harmony	Most Popular Artist of the Year	Nominated	
2016	Fifth Harmony	Best Public Artist	Won	

== Premios Tu Mundo ==
Premios Tu Mundo (Spanish for "Your World Awards"), is an awards show presented by American television network Telemundo. The awards celebrates the achievements of Hispanics and Latinos in the media including TV shows, movies, music, fashion, and sports.

Year	Nominee / work	Award	Result	Ref.
2015	Harmonizers	Fan Club of the Year	Nominated	

== Radio Disney Music Awards ==
The Radio Disney Music Awards (sometimes seen as the RDMAs) is an annual awards show which is operated and governed by Radio Disney, an American radio network. Fifth Harmony have won eight awards from nine nominations.

Year	Nominee / work	Award	Result	Ref.
2014	Fifth Harmony	Breakout Artist of the Year	Won	
2014	"Me & My Girls"	Best Song to Rock Out to With Your BFF	Won	
2015	Fifth Harmony	Best Music Group	Won	
2015	"Boss"	Catchiest New Song	Nominated	
2015	Harmonizers	Fiercest Fans	Won	
2016	Fifth Harmony	Best Music Group	Won	
2016	Harmonizers	Fiercest Fans	Won	
2017	Fifth Harmony	Best Group	Won	
2017	Harmonizers	Fiercest Fans	Won	

== Shorty Awards ==
The Shorty Awards honor the best of social media through tweet-nominations. People and organizations are recognized for producing real-time short form content across social media sites. Fifth Harmony has won one award from two nominations.

Year	Nominee / work	Award	Result	Ref.
2014	Fifth Harmony	Best Band	Won	
2015	Fifth Harmony	Best Band	Nominated	

== Streamy Awards ==
The Streamy Awards are presented annually by Dick Clark Productions and Tubefilter to recognize and honor excellence in online video, including directing, acting, producing, and writing. The formal ceremony at which the awards are presented takes place in Los Angeles, California.

Year	Nominee / work	Award	Result	Ref.
2015	"Uptown Funk" (featuring Jasmine V, Jacob Whitesides, and Mahogany Lox)	Cover Song	Nominated	

== Teen Choice Awards ==
The Teen Choice Awards were established in 1999 to honor the year's biggest achievements in music, movies, sports and television, being voted by young people aged between 13 and 19. Fifth Harmony have won ten awards from twenty-seven nominations.

Year	Nominee / work	Award	Result	Ref.
2014	Fifth Harmony	Choice Music Group	Nominated	
2014	Fifth Harmony	Choice Breakout Group	Nominated	
2014	Fifth Harmony	Choice Summer Group	Nominated	
2014	"Miss Movin' On"	Choice Break-Up Song	Nominated	
2014	Harmonizers	Choice Fanatic Fans	Nominated	
2014	"Boss"	Choice Single: Group	Nominated	
2015	"Worth It" (featuring Kid Ink)	Choice Song: Group	Nominated	
2015	"Worth It" (featuring Kid Ink)	Choice Summer Song	Won	
2015	"Sledgehammer"	Choice Love Song	Nominated	
2015	Fifth Harmony	Choice Music Group: Female	Won	
2015	Fifth Harmony	Choice Female Hottie	Won	
2015	Fifth Harmony	Choice Summer Music Star: Group	Nominated	
2015	Harmonizers	Choice Fandom	Nominated	
2016	Fifth Harmony	Choice Music Group	Nominated	
2016	Fifth Harmony	Choice Summer Music Star: Group	Nominated	
2016	Fifth Harmony	Choice Social Media Queen	Won	
2016	The 7/27 Tour	Choice Summer Tour	Nominated	
2016	Harmonizers	Choice Fandom	Nominated	
2016	"Work from Home" (featuring Ty Dolla Sign)	Choice Song: Group	Nominated	
2016	"Work from Home" (featuring Ty Dolla Sign)	Choice Summer Song	Won	
2016	"I'm In Love With A Monster"	Choice Song from a Movie or TV Show	Won	
2017	Fifth Harmony	Choice Music Group	Won	
2017	"Down" (featuring Gucci Mane)	Choice Song: Group	Won	
2017	Fifth Harmony	Choice Summer Group	Won	
2017	Harmonizers	Choice Fandom	Won	
2018	Fifth Harmony	Choice Music Group	Nominated	
2018	Harmonizers	Choice Fandom	Nominated	

== YouTube Music Awards ==
The YouTube Music Awards, abbreviated as the YTMAs, is the inaugural music award show presented by YouTube. Fifth Harmony has won one award from two nominations.

Year	Nominee / work	Award	Result	Ref.
2013	"Mirrors" (with Boyce Avenue)	Response of the Year	Nominated	
2015 (Note: For the 2015 ceremony, there were no nominated categories, simply an honorable list of artists to watch.)	Fifth Harmony	50 Artists to Watch	Won	
