= The Worst Kept Secret Tour =

2014 concert tour by Fifth Harmony

- National tour by Fifth Harmony
- Promotional poster for the tour
- Location: North America
- Associated album: Better Together
- Start date: February 12, 2014
- End date: March 24, 2014
- Legs: 1
- No. of shows: 5

Fifth Harmony concert chronology
- Fifth Harmony 2013 tour (2013); The Worst Kept Secret Tour (2014); Fifth Times a Charm Tour (2014)

The Worst Kept Secret Tour (billed as The Worst Kept Secret 2014 Tour) was the second headlining concert tour by American girl group Fifth Harmony. It was announced in November 2013 and began in Ventura, California on February 12, 2014 and ended on March 24, 2014 in Buffalo, New York. The group performed in the tour around the same time when they were opening acts for Demi Lovato's Neon Lights Tour. The official poster for the tour was chosen by Fifth Harmony among many nominations submitted by fans. It was planned as an early tour for fans who were going to see the group in the Neon Lights Tour.

== Set list ==
This set list is representative of every show in this tour; however, it does change in one.

1. "Me & My Girls"
2. "Better Together"
3. "One Wish"
4. "Tellin' Me"
5. "Who Are You"
6. "Honeymoon Avenue" (Ariana Grande cover)
7. "Leave My Heart Out of This"
8. "Independent Women" (Destiny's Child cover)
9. "Don't Wanna Dance Alone"
10. "Miss Movin' On"
11. "Anything Could Happen" (Ellie Goulding cover)
Notes
- During the fourth show in Milwaukee, Fifth Harmony performed every song in their set list except for "One Wish", "Tellin' Me", "Who Are You", "Honeymoon Avenue" and "Anything Could Happen".
Special guests
- February 12, 2014 – Ventura, California: McClain
- February 27, 2014 – Orlando, Florida: Before You Exit and Jackson Harris
- March 3, 2014 – Albany, New York: Talia Denis
- March 19, 2014 – Milwaukee, Wisconsin: Shealeigh
- March 24, 2014 – Buffalo, New York: Jackson Harris

== Tour dates ==
List of concerts, showing date, city, country, and venue
Date	City	Country	Venue
February 12, 2014	Ventura	United States	Ventura Theatre
February 27, 2014	Orlando	United States	House of Blues
March 3, 2014	Clifton Park	United States	Upstate Concert Hall
March 19, 2014	Milwaukee	United States	The Pabst Theater
March 24, 2014	Buffalo	United States	Town Ballroom
