= Z100 =

Z100 may refer to:

== American radio stations known as Z100 ==
- KKRZ in Portland, Oregon
- KZOQ-FM in Missoula, Montana
- KZRO in Mount Shasta, California
- WBIZ-FM in Eau Claire, Wisconsin
- WHTZ in Newark, New Jersey
- WJZR, now WRFX, in Kannapolis/Charlotte, North Carolina, known as Z100 from August 1983 until late 1985
- WZRA, now WEAN-FM, in Wakefield-Peacedale, Rhode Island
- KLRZ in New Orleans, Louisiana, known as Z-100 in the 1990s
- WZZF, now WVVR in Hopkinsville, Kentucky, known as Z-100 from 1986 until 1990

== Other uses ==
- Zenith Z-100, an early microcomputer
- Sendo Z100, a mobile phone model
- Z100, a Shanghai–Kowloon through train

== See also ==
- Zenair CH 100
