= I'm in Love with a Monster =

Single by Fifth Harmony
- Released: August 14, 2015
- Recorded: 2015
- Genre: Pop
- Length: 3:31
- Label: Epic; Syco
- Songwriters: Harmony Samuels; Carmen Reece; Sarah Mancuso; Edgar Etienne; Ericka Coulter
- Producer: Harmony Samuels

Fifth Harmony singles chronology
"Worth It" (2015)	"I'm in Love with a Monster" (2015)	"Work from Home" (2016)

Music video
- "I'm in Love with a Monster" on YouTube

"I'm in Love with a Monster" is a song recorded by American girl group Fifth Harmony for the 2015 animated film, Hotel Transylvania 2. It was written by Harmony Samuels, Carmen Reece, Sarah Mancuso, Edgar Etienne and Ericka Coulter with production handled by Samuels. It was released to digital retailers on August 14, 2015 through Epic Records and Syco Music and serviced to contemporary hit radio in the United States four days later on August 18. "I'm in Love with a Monster" is a pop song that blends elements of R&B, soul, and hip hop with "jazzy" rhythms along with heavy and funky beats. Critics drew comparisons to the musical style of girl groups such as The Supremes.

Lyrically, the track is about someone who is in love with a mischievous person, using "monster" as a hyperbole to describe their personality. The song failed to chart in domestic and international charts. Its music video premiered at the Sony billboard in Times Square on August 27, 2015 and features the group dancing in front and inside a hotel with actors dressed as monsters, in reference to the song's addition in the movie. Each member played a character for this video. Live performances for this track included The Late Late Show, hosted by James Corden and a special radio performance at On Air with Ryan Seacrest.

The song was released to digital retailers as a single, and was later featured on the Japanese deluxe edition of the group's debut studio album, Reflection.

== Recording and release ==
An announcement of the artist involved in the track for Hotel Transylvania 2 was first made public by Lia Vollack, president of Worldwide Music for Sony Pictures Animation, on June 16, 2015. When making the announcement at the press release, Vollack commented that there were "few groups out there" that could match the "incredibly fun feel" and the "animated vision" that Genndy Tartakovsky brought to the movie and stated that Fifth Harmony "knocked it out of the park." According to Vollack, the track was exactly what "we were hoping for." A preview of "I'm in Love with a Monster" was featured in a trailer for the movie which was released on June 17, 2015. The song was released for digital download on August 14. and serviced to contemporary hit radio four days later on August 18.

"I'm in Love with a Monster" was written by Harmony Samuels, Carmen Reece, Sarah Mancuso, Edgar Etienne and Ericka Coulter. Samuels also produced the track, as well as being responsible for trombones, drums, percussion, bass and vocal production. When speaking on working with group, Samuels, who previously worked on the Reflection track "Body Rock" stated that the girls knew how to "work among themselves" and made the production process "very easy". In other interviews, he called the group "mature" and that after several years recording music, they are "starting to explore their individualities", which was a goal producing this track.

== Composition ==
"I'm in Love with a Monster"
A 19-second sample of "I'm in Love with a Monster", which features musical elements of the 1960s music, such as funk and soul music.

"I'm in Love with a Monster" is a funk-influenced pop song performed in a moderately fast tempo. According to the sheet music published at Musicnotes.com by Sony Music Publishing, "I'm in Love with a Monster" is written in the key of C♯ minor and is set in a 4/4 time signature. The song has been viewed as reminiscent of 1960s music, with Jeff Benjamin of Fuse describing the tune as a "throwback-inspired funk jam-thumper". The song utilizes "deep heavy beats, trombones and drums over an almost creepy base." The lyrics of "I'm in Love with a Monster" revolve around a person who is in love with a mischievous person, using "monster" as a hyperbole to describe its personality. Carolyn Menyes from website "Music Times" commented that the song "takes on loving an unconventional type of guy, who is, well, a monster. He's the type who will buy you thorns and leather before roses and lace."

== Critical reception ==
"I'm in Love with a Monster" received mostly positive responses, with several critics noting a similarity between the musical style of 1960's all-female group The Supremes. Robbie Daw, from Idolator pointed out the resemblance to 1960s girl groups, such as the Supremes, and said, "Fifth Harmony's vocal ability shine brightly." In a positive review, Joseph Earp of Renowned for Sound said that the song is a "testament" to the group's "myriad of skills" in which it does not feel like a "movie cash in". He elaborates by stating that this was "as rich and deep" as anything the group has ever released. Earp gave the song a four and a half out of five stars rating.

Writing for Fuse, Jeff Benjamin compared the "booming tuba" to the 1960s track, "Big Spender" and called the chorus "slick" and "repetitive". Phillip Picardi of Teen Vogue wrote that the song is "catchy and upbeat, with a nod to the '60s", from a cross between early Pussycat Dolls and The Supremes". Picardi finishes his review by stating that despite the group's previous songs like "Boss" and "Worth It", which hold momentum, this song is "still gold." Conversely, Chris DeVille of Stereogum was critical of the song saying that it was a "dumb soundtrack song (sic) for kids movies" and stated that the track did not compare with the singles from Reflection.

== Music video ==
The music video debuted on New York City's Time Square Plaza on August 27, 2015. It later premiered on Vevo the same day. Members of the girl group each reprise the role of a different character, but a "fun, gothic style" and Halloween-themed decor is common throughout the video. In an exclusive behind the scenes interview with Entertainment Tonight, the group revealed that Camila played Margaret, Lauren played Scarlett, Dinah played Cathy, Normani played Suga and Ally played Mary Jane. Scenes from Hotel Transylvania 2 are spliced with scenes of Fifth Harmony exploring a haunted hotel accompanied by a variety of monsters.

=== Synopsis and reception ===
The members of Fifth Harmony dressed in 1940s style attire, dancing in front of a hotel in reminisence of a Halloween theme.

The video begins with a static television screen showing the group's name before interchanging clips from the Hotel Transylvania 2 movie and individual takes of the girls inside a hotel. The setting is Halloween themed with skulls, candles and dim lighting throughout the area. All girls then stand in front of a hotel, with different colored suitcases and each wearing coats while dancing. Lauren then sings as she holds a rotary dial telephone in her hand. The scene intensifies as rapid shots of the girls appear on screen. Synchronized choreography is performed by all the girls, in front of the hotel. Interchanged scenes consist of movie clips and Normani and Dinah behaving in a seductive way as the monsters make their way towards the halls.

Each group then stands in a hallway, singing and moving to a camera before walking as Lauren holds a candle lantern in her hand as an ominous purple light beams in the background before turning blue. All of them are seen wearing large sunglasses. In different takes, the group dances mimicking a zombie. The monsters then make their way to the rooms, where some initially attempt to fight them but eventually interact with them, by taking pictures, dancing and seducing them. Towards the end of the video, one of the monsters snaps his finger, putting Ally to sleep. The girls begin to act more aggressive, laughing maniacally, with the video zooming out to the show the initial static screen. Zach Dionne of Fuse described the styling of Fifth Harmony's costumes as "Stepford Wives-gone-Addams Family" and also commented that the video was reminiscent of the TRL era when many music videos often included scenes from movies. As of November 2024, the video has over 200 million views.

== Track listing ==
- Digital download

No.	Title	Length
1.	"I'm in Love with a Monster"	3:31

== Charts ==
Chart (2015)	Peak position
Belgium (Ultratip Bubbling Under Flanders)	23

== Release history ==
Country	Date	Format	Label	Ref
United States	August 14, 2015	Digital download	Syco	
United States	August 18, 2015	Contemporary hit radio	Syco	
