= Worth It (Fifth Harmony song) =

Single by Fifth Harmony featuring Kid Ink

from the album Reflection
- Released: January 19, 2015
- Recorded: 2014
- Studio: Windmark (Santa Monica, California); Westlake (West Hollywood, California); R8D (West Hollywood, California); The Hide Out (London, United Kingdom)
- Genre: Dance-pop; R&B
- Length: 3:44
- Label: Epic; Syco
- Composers: Mikkel S. Eriksen; Tor Erik Hermansen; Ori Kaplan
- Lyricist: Priscilla Renea
- Producers: Stargate; Ori Kaplan

Fifth Harmony singles chronology
"Sledgehammer" (2014)	"Worth It" (2015)	"I'm in Love with a Monster" (2015)

Kid Ink singles chronology
"Ride Out" (2015)	"Worth It" (2015)	"Be Real" (2015)

Music video
- "Worth It" on YouTube

"Worth It" is a song by American girl group Fifth Harmony, featuring American rapper Kid Ink. It impacted American rhythmic crossover radio on March 2, 2015, as the third and final single from the group's debut studio album, Reflection (2015). Written by Priscilla Renea and its producers Stargate, "Worth It" is a dance-pop and R&B song that incorporates a strong use of Balkan music and Middle Eastern music in its production. The lyrics discuss themes of feminism, self-worth and confidence, and include double entendres.

The song became a sleeper hit on the US Billboard Hot 100 where it peaked at number 12, marking the group's highest-charting single at the time and the first top 20 single by a girl group in the US since "Jai Ho! (You Are My Destiny)" by The Pussycat Dolls in 2009. It reached number one in Lebanon, number three on the UK Singles Chart, and the top 10 in Australia and Hungary. It is certified Quadruple Platinum in the US and Gold or higher in eleven additional countries. The song has over 1.1 billion streams on Spotify. Directed by Cameron Duddy, the music video has themes of female empowerment with Fifth Harmony dominating men as business executives. It has received over two billion views on YouTube. The group promoted "Worth It" with several televised performances, including the season twenty-one finale of Dancing with the Stars, Jimmy Kimmel Live! and at the 2015 MTV Europe Music Awards.

== Background and development ==
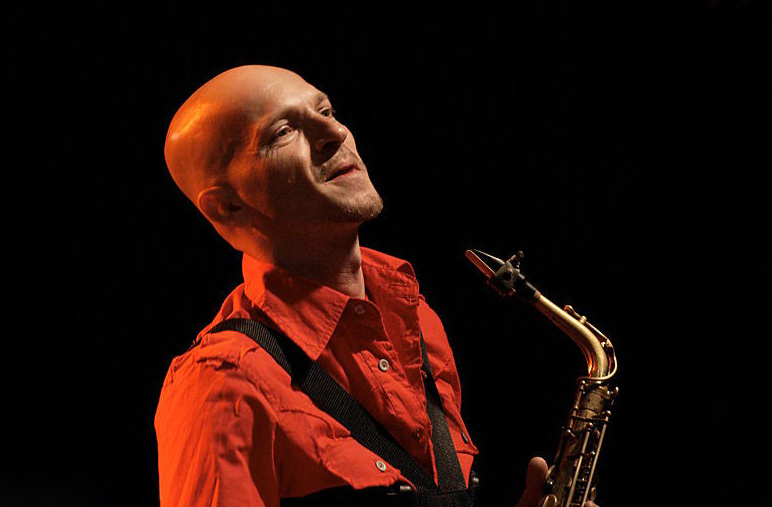
Ori Kaplan, who produced "Talk Dirty" by Jason Derulo, also co-produced and co-wrote "Worth It".

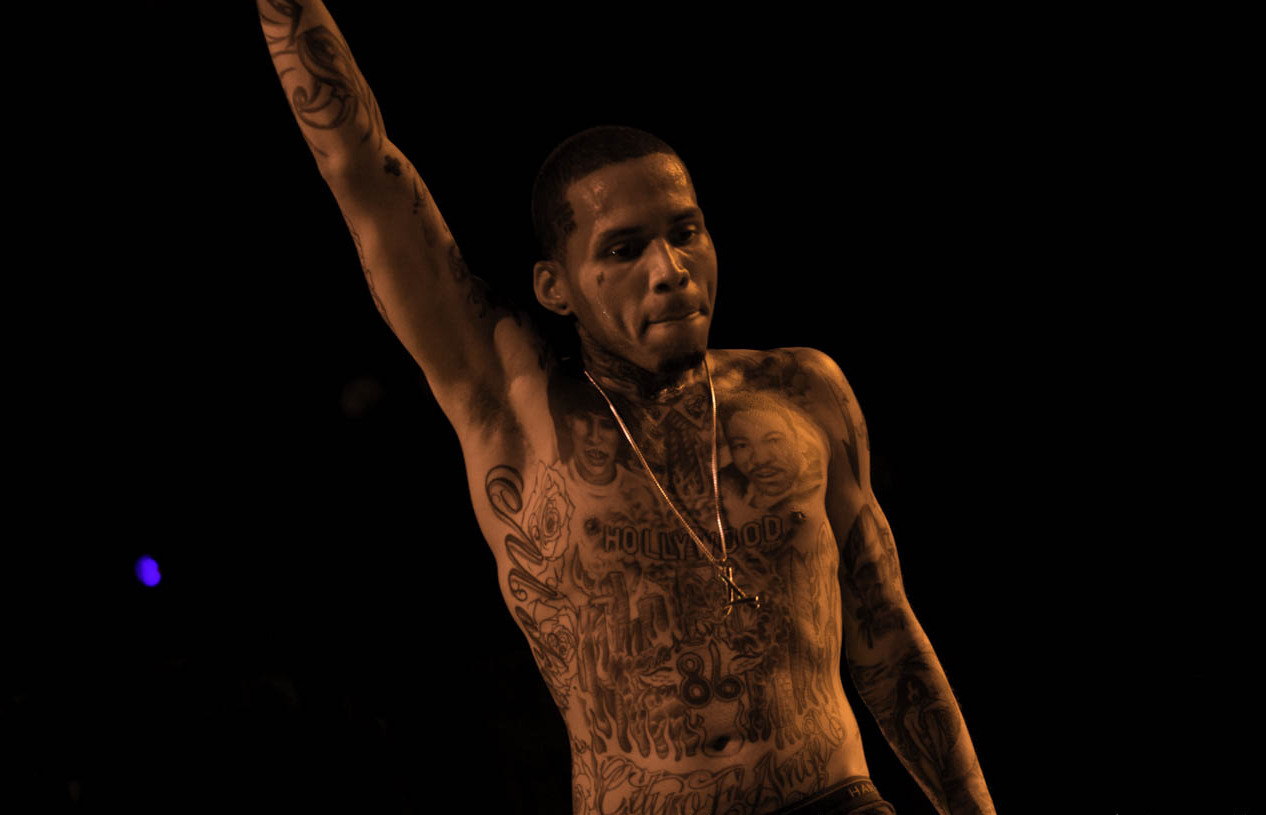
Kid Ink, pictured in March 2012, features in the song.

"Worth It" was produced and co-written by Norwegian production company, Stargate, consisting of duo Mikkel S. Eriksen and Tor Erik Hermansen and Ori Kaplan, with additional writing from Priscilla Renea. The song was released on January 15, 2015, on streaming and downloading services but officially impacted American rhythmic crossover radio as a single on March 2, 2015. A Spanish version subtitled "Dame Esta Noche" (Spanish for "Give Me This Night") was released to iTunes on July 10, 2015, following the success of the single. The track features Kid Ink's English rap verse, while the group sings in Spanish.

Originally intended for recording by rapper Kid Ink, who ended up collaborating on the song, the lyrics and melody were changed to fit a female perspective. Kid Ink noted during an interview with Forbes that while he was "writing on their album", he was able to collaborate with "producers Stargate and Cashmere Cat" and this led to the development of the song. One of Kid Ink's verses from "Wit It" (the original version of the song) appears on this song. Speaking to Complex, Dinah Jane explained that the song was unplanned for the album, saying "there were no females on the song". After the song was presented to them by production team Stargate, they changed part of the lyrics and bits "of the concept" to "fit [their] perspective". Lauren Jauregui also shared similar sentiments, saying that she "didn't think" the track would "make the album". In an interview with Billboard, music director David Armbrecht explained that the song is a "message of self-empowerment, which is made clear in its triumphant 'Give it to me, I'm worth it!' chorus". The song speaks to women of "all demographics", he said, explaining that this can be applied to anyone in a "relationship" or "getting out of one" and it is likely that one can get "tired of the games" and deserve better, using the song to do just that.

== Composition ==
"Worth It"
"Worth It" takes its music from a variety of instrumentation, as a trap-inspired Roland TR-808, heavy bassline, handclaps and a saxophone as its foundation. Several music critics noted that "Worth It" production is comparable to "Talk Dirty" by Jason Derulo for similar use of horns.

Musically, "Worth It" incorporates dance-pop and contemporary R&B with influences of hip hop and Balkan music. The song contains elements from a variety of music genres. It can be noted mainly in its instrumentation, which incorporates a Balkan-inflected saxophone, trance synths and a trap-inspired Roland TR-808 drum machine. Songwriting and production is largely based on previous Kaplan and Stargate's productions, most notably Jason Derulo's "Talk Dirty", which shows similar song scheme and use of horns during the hook. The song is written from the perspective of a woman telling a man that she is "Worth It", implying sexual connotation. However, it can be considered as a feminist anthem, according to Jeff Benjamin from Fuse, it can inspire "young girls to truly believe they're 'Worth It' and can own Wall Street or any other place on which they set their sights". This latter view of the song is highlighted in its music video.

The song opens with a saxophone sample that introduces the repetitive hook, where the group sings repeatedly the phrase "Give it to me, I'm worth it", backed by heavy bassline and "trappy beats" Followed by Kid Ink's rapped verse, Emilee Linder of MTV noted he insists that they "bring it back like they left something". Member Dinah Jane is then introduced, back by handclaps. Normani Kordei performs the pre-chorus (which is then performed by Ally Brooke after the second verse), while the second verse is sung by Camila Cabello, who delivers the song's most suggestive lines, "Come harder just because/I don't like it, like it too soft/I like it a little rough/Not too much, but maybe just enough". Lauren Jauregui is the only member of the band that doesn't sing a solo in the song. According to the sheet music published by Sony Music Publishing at Musicnotes.com, the song is written in the key of C minor and is set in a 4/4 time signature with a moderate tempo of 100 beats per minute. Fifth Harmony and Kid Ink's vocal range spans from the low note of G_{3} to the high note of A♭_{5}. The saxophone's melody spans the tonal range of E_{4} to C_{6}.

== Critical reception ==
"Worth It" received mixed reviews from music critics, receiving praise for its catchy rhythm and attitude but was criticized for sounding similar to Jason Derulo's "Talk Dirty". Rick Florino from Artistdirect praised "Worth It", giving it a five out of five star rating, claiming the song has "an empowering refrain that's impossible to shake, especially when coupled with a slippery beat". FDRMX also reviewed it positively, mentioning that "the production is solid and the lyrics are catchy" and also stating that the single is Fifth Harmony's most mature record yet. Several music publications considered it a strong contender for song of the summer.

Rebecca Mattina, from Andpop gave the song a mixed review, noting too-close a similarity to "Talk Dirty" but also stating that the track is "filled with lots of attitude" and rhythmic bounce. Conversely, Music Times gave it a positive review stating 'the intense, creeping music of "Worth It" is matched with deep harmonies from 5H and personally positive lyrics". They made a comparison to the first lead single of Reflection (2015), "Boss". In a review for their debut album, Reflection (2015), Meaghan Garvey of Pitchfork commented that the song is an "exhaustive exquisite corpse of practically every radio hit of the last year and a half" and criticizes the "wholly unremarkable rap verse" performed by Kid Ink.

In a negative review, Jason Lipshutz from Billboard, stated that the song sounded "oddly incomplete." Lipshutz also highlighted the song's "repetitive phrasing." In a mixed-positive review, Amy Davidson, from Digital Spy, noted that "trumpets and saxophones have experienced a resurgence [and Fifth Harmony] have laid it on thick for some serious sax-sampling. 'Give it to me I'm worth it,' they determine, dripping with sass." Davidson also stated, "It mightn't be the most groundbreaking of tracks, but it's got enough attitude to forgive that." For their year-end list of best songs, Associated Press listed it at number three and Spin ranked it at 68. Artistdirect ranked the song at number one in their mid-year report.

== Commercial performance ==
=== North America ===
On the chart dated February 7, 2015, "Worth It" debuted on the Billboard Hot 100 at number 82. It would exit the chart the following week and re-enter on the third week at number 93. On the Mainstream Top 40 and Rhythmic charts, the song debuted at 39 and 38, respectively. On the main chart, it would exit once again, this time for four weeks, before charting at number 92. For the week dated March 28, 2015, the song rose five spots to a new position at number 87. Following the release of the music video, which premiered at the Kids' Choice Awards, the song rose nine spots to number 78. The promotion from the video and the show's audience gave the song a 20 spot jump at number 58 for the week dated April 11, 2015. For the week dated April 18, 2015, the song rose 17 spots to a peak of 41. The following week, the song rose two spots at a new peak of 39, earning the group their second top 40 hit and their highest-charting single at the time of the publication. It recorded 48,000 digital sales, a five percent slip from the previous week and a four percent increase at 3.6 million streams. On the Mainstream Top 40 chart, the song would peak at number four, earning them their first top 10 hit as well as their first entry in the Rhythmic chart, where the song peaked at number 19

For the week dated May 2, 2015, the song rose five more spots to a peak of number 34 and two more spots the following week. The song rose 11 spots again to a new peak of 21, for the week dated May 16, 2015 and would be stationary for another week. The next week, the song rose two more spots at a new peak of 19, earning the group their first top 20 single, gaining radio airplay by 18 percent at a 31 million audience. This occurred a week after a minor controversy, where the group was scheduled to perform the track on the Billboard Music Awards but instead presented an award, citing time issues with the rehearsal and production of the song. Instead, they opted for a performance of the song at the season twenty finale of Dancing with the Stars. For the week dated June 6, 2015, the song rose two spots to number 17. It would fall one spot for the week dated June 13, 2015 and would stay there for one week before rising three spots to number 15. The song would rise one spot and staying at number 14, recording a rise of 7 percent at a 79 million audience for radio airplay and charting at number 10 on the Radio Songs chart for the week dated July 22, 2015. The song would reach its peak of number 12 on the chart dated August 8, 2015, becoming the week's streaming gainer. Since its release, the song has sold over 1,700,000 copies, according to a publication from Billboard, on May 12, 2017. It achieved a triple platinum certification by the Recording Industry Association of America, for combined sales and track-equivalent streams units of three million; additionally, as of 2016, it was one of only twenty-two songs released in 2015 to be certified multi-platinum.

The song debuted at number 92 in Canada on the week marked April 11, 2015. For the following week, the song rose 25 spots at a position at number 67 and then another the week after that. It would rise 12 spots once again for the week dated May 2, 2015. The song would rise one spot for two consecutive weeks, before staying stationary for one week. It continued to rise in positions, two spots then six spots to a peak at number 44 for the week of June 6, 2015. It would rise another ten spots to peak at number 34, earning the group their first top 40 entry in this market. The following week, the song continued its rise, jumping 13 spots to number 21. It would rise once again, peaking at number 16, and earning the group their first top 20 entry as well for the week dated June 27, 2015. It rose one spot for two consecutive weeks before falling two spots at number 16. After a series of drops and rises, the song would peak at number 12, on the week of September 5, 2015. It was certified double platinum for selling over 160,000 digital copies. In Mexico, the song topped both its English and domestic charts. It was subsequently promoted through a Spanish release, where the group sang their verses in Spanish. It was certified platinum for selling 60,000 copies.

=== Elsewhere ===
The song was released in the United Kingdom through digital download on June 21, 2015, over six months since being released in the United States market and more than three months later since receiving airplay there as well. For the week of July 4, 2015, the song debuted at number 81 on the UK Singles Chart. It rose thirty spots to a peak of 51, the following week. For the week dated July 16, 2015, the song rose 48 spots to a peak at number 3, earning the group their first top five entry on the chart. The song would stay in the top 40 for eight additional weeks and would chart for a total of 19 weeks. The song peaked in the top 20 of nine additional countries. In Hungary, the song entered the top 10 of the country's three domestic charts, rising six spots to a peak of number 2 on the week of September 20, 2015 on the singles chart. On the dance and radios chart, the song rose three spots for the same week as the singles chart, to a peak of seven and rose one spot to a peak at number four, respectively. In the French charts, the song peaked at number 15 and charted for a total of 29 weeks. Similarly, in Germany, the song peaked at number 16 and would chart for 31 weeks.

In Australia, the song would peak at number nine, earning the group their first top 10 entry in this market. The song would stay in the top 10 for an additional week and would chart for a total of fifteen weeks. Conversely, in the New Zealand market, the song failed to reach the top 20, charting at 31 and appearing on the chart for fourteen weeks. The song received airplay in Middle Eastern markets, topping the charts in both Israel and Lebanon. The song's blend of Balkan music, which has been a staple in the Middle East, aided in its success in this region. The song debuted at number 98 on the Japanese Hot 100 for the week January 23, 2016. The following week, it rose 44 spots to a new peak of 54. It would rise 25 more spots to a new position at number 29 and then three spots to a position at 26, where it would reach its peak. Across seas, the song peaked at 53 on the Brazilian Billboard Hot 100, making its first appearance on this chart.

== Music video ==
=== Background and reception ===
"We also wanted to incorporate feminism and girl power and our fans, so we kind of did this Twitter thing where we... told them to send in tweets saying why they think feminism is sexy and why they think it’s cool and why they think women empowerment is awesome."

— Camila Cabello talking to MTV about fans' tweets that appear in the music video.

The music video premiered at the 2015 Kids' Choice Awards on March 28, 2015. It was uploaded the same day to the group's official Vevo account and directed by Cameron Duddy. The video follows a similar concept from their lead single, "Boss", focusing on themes of self-worth, confidence and female empowerment. The "Worth It" music video earned Fifth Harmony their first Vevo certified award in July 2015 and later reached the one-billion-view mark on July 26, 2016. With over 2 billion views, it is now one of the 60 most viewed YouTube videos of all time and the second-most watched YouTube video by a girl group, being overtaken at the number one spot for most watched video with "Work from Home", which was released a nearly a year later.

Critics were positively receptive of the video, some calling the visuals "sexy" and commending the message of female empowerment that is the group executes. In a positive review, MTV called it "surprisingly sexy" and compared the office look of the video to Fifty Shades of Grey. Christina Lee from Idolator praised the video for putting women in position of power. She notes the video's ambiguous message, but knows there is a "clear difference between women dressing for the male gaze and doing so for their own personal satisfaction." The video was abruptly deleted from YouTube on July 18. At the time, a static screen appeared that read, "This video has been removed as a violation of YouTube's policy on repetitive, misleading or inappropriate metadata." It was later re-uploaded with the previous views intact. When reached to comment on the issue, a spokesperson for YouTube later commented saying that videos can be taken down by mistake but a review is taken to take "appropriate action", which include restoring videos that were previously removed. However, there could be another reason why it was taken down, which is because of its sexualized portrayal of Cabello and Jane, who were underage when the video was filmed.

=== Synopsis ===
The video begins with shots of the skyline of Hong Kong, where most of the setting takes place. An image of a stock market appears, zooming in on what appears to say, "@FifthHarmony women in power". The girls then appear in silhouettes and begin walking confidently as men stand next to a wall, appearing to stand in attention to the ladies. Individual shots of every girl are shown, giggling and smiling at the camera, before switching back to the stock market background. The group perform a choreographed dance move, and a Newton's cradle is shown being used, in rhythm to the song. The words "break through the glass ceiling" appear in stock market background, a reference to the obstacles that minorities, particularly minority women, have when climbing the corporate ladder.

The members of Fifth Harmony dress in business-esque attire, demonstrating themes of feminism and self-worth.

The verse changes to Kid Ink, who is dressed in almost all-black clothing, he doesn't move his body and is stationary, which is to show he is being forced into humiliation. He appears to be sitting in an office room with two attractive women approaching him as he sings. The women are dressed in business attire and are shown to have green eyes, in this case it is to show their possessiveness over him, tricking him into signing a fake cheque into fraud. A man is shown cleaning Dinah's shoe, as she controls him. She then kicks him to show she is not controlled by anyone. The scene shifts to Normani, who is sporting a fashionable business outfit with a white blazer. She then dramatically stands up from her chair, while a man, who appears to be her accountant, looks at her in a frightened motion. Just like the women sitting next to Kid Ink, he also appears to have green eyes, but in this case it is to show his jealousy of them, as shown in Shakespeare. All members perform a dance move, when the setting shifts to Camila getting ready to play golf in her office. Ally is then shown with a man who also appears to be her accountant, similar to Normani. Lauren is seen in the back of a convertible black car with a man in the driver's seat. Each girl either flicks the man next to them or kicks them in frustration.

The ladies are now in the stock market background, telling their lover that they're "Worth It". They also seem to rush their accountants, who are continuously typing on their calculators. The words "feminism is sexy" appear in the stock market background, before switching to Kid Ink, where the women move in-sync to the rhythm as he raps. The camera zooms into the eyes of a woman, with her eyes appearing bright green. The group perform more choreographed dance moves individually and as a group. Shots of all the members winking their eye, smiling, and showing confidence are shown. The video ends with the group facing away from the camera and looking at the stock market behind them, then turn around and move their hands upward, a similar ending to the group's past videos.

== Live performances ==
Fifth Harmony performed "Worth It" live for the first time on VH1's Big Morning Buzz Live on February 17, 2015. They performed the song on Live! with Kelly and Michael on April 13, as well as on the Radio Disney Music Awards which aired on April 26, 2015. The song was also performed on the finale of Dancing with the Stars on May 19, 2015. Outside of the United States, the group performed for the first time in the United Kingdom at Good Morning Britain on June 5, 2015 as well as Capital FM's Summertime Ball at Wembley Stadium the following day and on CBBC's Friday Download a month later. The group performed the song with Kid Ink for the first time on Jimmy Kimmel Live on June 18, 2015, and this was also their first ever late night appearance.

The group returned to the United States after performing in several programs in the United Kingdom with a morning appearance on The Today Show along with two other songs from their album. At the 2015 Premios Juventud and the season finale of the Latin American singing competition La Banda, the group sang a mix of "Worth It" and "Dame Esta Noche", the Spanish version of the aforementioned single. As one of Taylor Swift's many guest appearances on her 1989 World Tour, the group performed the song with Swift herself in Santa Clara, California. Other performances included the BET Players' Awards, a red carpet performance at the 2015 MTV Europe Music Awards and a return to Jimmy Kimmel Live, where the group performed in an outdoor concert series with multiple songs, including "Boss", "Sledgehammer" and "Work from Home". They also performed the song for the second time at The Today Show along with "Boss" and two songs from their sophomore studio album, 7/27.

"Worth It" is also on the setlist for Fifth Harmony's Reflection Tour and its summer leg. The song is also on the setlist for the group's performances at the 2015 New York, New York; Atlanta, Georgia; Chicago, Illinois; and Sunrise, Florida Jingle Ball concerts. The song is also included on the group's headlining The 7/27 Tour and PSA Tour.

The group performed the song live during the Jonas Brothers' Jonas20: Greetings from Your Hometown Tour stop in Dallas on August 31, 2025, as they returned to the stage for the first time in seven years as a quartet. It is also incorporated some elements from "All in My Head (Flex)" and Leon Haywood's "I Want'a Do Something Freaky to You" during the pre-recorded Kid Ink's verse. Despite the departure of former member Camila Cabello, her pre-recorded vocals was remained intact in chorus parts.

== In other media ==
The song is featured in the films Little, Hotel Transylvania 2 and How to Be Single as well as the television shows The Mindy Project, Telenovela, Lethal Weapon and Mary + Jane. This song is also used in a PetSmart advertisement. and a national commercial for Hershey's Caramel. In 2023, a cover version of this song was featured on a Kroger ad. This song is also featured for 2015 FIFA Women's World Cup in Canada which the United States won the final on July 6, 2015 in Vancouver. The song was featured on the soundtrack for 2015 EA Sports video games Madden NFL 16 and Rory McIlroy PGA Tour.

== Credits and personnel ==
Recorded at Westlake Studios (Los Angeles), Windmark Recording (Santa Monica) and The Hide Out Studios (London)
Mixed at Larrabee Sound Studios (North Hollywood)

- Camila Cabello – lead vocals
- Ally Brooke - lead vocals
- Dinah Jane - lead vocals
- Normani Kordei - lead vocals
- Lauren Jauregui - supporting vocals/harmony
- Kid Ink – guest vocals
- Priscilla Renea – songwriter
- Mikkel Storleer Eriksen – songwriter, producer, all other instruments, recording
- Tor Erik Hermansen – songwriter, producer, all other instruments
- Ori Kaplan – songwriter, co-producer, saxophone
- Miles Walker – recording
- Mike Anderson – recording
- Jaycen Joshua – mixing
- Ryan Kaul – mixing assistant
- Maddox Chhim – mixing assistant
- Tim Blacksmith – executive producer
- Danny D – executive producer

Credits adapted from the liner notes of Reflection.

== Track listings ==
- Digital download
1. "Worth It" (featuring Kid Ink) – 3:44
- CD single
1. "Worth It" (featuring Kid Ink) – 3:44
2. "Worth It" (Non-rap version) – 3:05
- Digital download
1. "Worth It (Dame Esta Noche)" (featuring Kid Ink) (Spanish version) – 3:43

• Digital download

1. "Worth It (Non-rap super clean version) – 3:05

== Charts ==
=== Weekly charts ===
Chart (2015–2016)	Peak position
Australia (ARIA)	9
Austria (Ö3 Austria Top 40)	23
Belgium (Ultratop 50 Flanders)	14
Belgium Urban (Ultratop Flanders)	3
Belgium (Ultratop 50 Wallonia)	18
Canada Hot 100 (Billboard)	12
Canada CHR/Top 40 (Billboard)	5
Canada Hot AC (Billboard)	31
Czech Republic Singles Digital (ČNS IFPI)	6
Czech Republic Airplay (ČNS IFPI)	25
Europe (Euro Digital Songs)	5
France (SNEP)	15
France Airplay (SNEP)	8
Germany (GfK)	16
Greece Digital Songs (Billboard)	2
Hungary (Dance Top 40)	7
Hungary (Rádiós Top 40)	4
Hungary (Single Top 40)	2
Ireland (IRMA)	23
Israel International Airplay (Media Forest)	1
Italy (FIMI)	32
Japan Hot 100 (Billboard)	26
Lebanon (Lebanese Top 20)	1
Luxembourg Digital Song Sales (Billboard)	9
Mexico (Billboard Mexican Airplay)	1
Mexico Anglo (Monitor Latino)	1
Netherlands (Dutch Top 40)	25
Netherlands (Single Top 100)	25
New Zealand (Recorded Music NZ)	31
Poland (Polish Airplay New)	3
Portugal Digital Song Sales (Billboard)	6
Romania Airplay (Media Forest)	4
Scottish Singles Sales (Official Charts)	3
Slovakia Singles Digital (ČNS IFPI)	11
Spain (PROMUSICAE)	62
Sweden (Sverigetopplistan)	63
South Korea International Singles (Gaon)	12
Switzerland (Schweizer Hitparade)	21
UK Singles (Official Charts)	3
US Billboard Hot 100	12
US Adult Pop Airplay (Billboard)	22
US Dance Airplay (Billboard)	5
US Latin Airplay (Billboard)	48
US Pop Airplay (Billboard)	4
US Rhythmic Airplay (Billboard)	19

2025 weekly chart performance for "Worth It"
Chart (2025)	Peak position
Moldova Airplay (TopHit)	40

=== Monthly charts ===
2025 monthly chart performance for "Worth It"
Chart (2025)	Peak position
Moldova Airplay (TopHit)	60

=== Year-end charts ===
Chart (2015)	Position
Australia (ARIA)	62
Belgium (Ultratop 50 Flanders)	55
Belgium Urban (Ultratop Flanders)	88
Canada (Canadian Hot 100)	32
CIS (Tophit)	57
France (SNEP)	70
Germany (GfK)	49
Hungary (Dance Top 40)	27
Hungary (Rádiós Top 40)	50
Hungary (Single Top 40)	50
Italy (FIMI)	72
Israel (Media Forest)	4
Netherlands (Single Top 100)	69
Russia Airplay (Tophit)	55
Switzerland (Schweizer Hitparade)	66
Ukraine Airplay (Tophit)	145
UK Singles (OCC)	99
US Billboard Hot 100	23
US Dance/Mix Show Airplay (Billboard)	29
US Mainstream Top 40 (Billboard)	16

Chart (2016)	Position
Brazil (Brasil Hot 100)	25
Hungary (Dance Top 40)	14

Chart (2022)	Position
Hungary (Rádiós Top 40)	66

== Certifications and sales ==
Certifications and sales for "Worth It"
Region	Certification	Certified units/sales
Australia (ARIA)	2× Platinum	140,000^{‡}
Austria (IFPI Austria)	Gold	15,000^{‡}
Belgium (BRMA)	Gold	10,000^{‡}
Canada (Music Canada)	2× Platinum	160,000^{*}
Denmark (IFPI Danmark)	Platinum	90,000^{‡}
Germany (BVMI)	Platinum	400,000^{‡}
Italy (FIMI)	2× Platinum	100,000^{‡}
Mexico (AMPROFON)	3× Platinum	180,000^{‡}
New Zealand (RMNZ)	2× Platinum	60,000^{‡}
Poland (ZPAV)	2× Platinum	100,000^{‡}
Spain (Promusicae)	Gold	20,000^{‡}
Sweden (GLF)	Platinum	40,000^{‡}
United Kingdom (BPI)	Platinum	600,000^{‡}
United States (RIAA)	3× Platinum	3,000,000^{‡}
^{*} Sales figures based on certification alone.^{‡} Sales+streaming figures based on certification alone.

== Release history ==
Country	Date	Format	Label	Ref.
United States	January 19, 2015	Digital download	Epic	
United States	March 2, 2015	Mainstream radio	Epic	
United Kingdom	June 21, 2015	Digital download	Syco	
