= Miss Movin' On =

Single by Fifth Harmony

from the EP Better Together
- B-side: "Me & My Girls"
- Released: July 16, 2013
- Studio: The Guest House Studios (Los Angeles, California)
- Genre: Power pop
- Length: 3:14
- Label: Syco; Epic
- Songwriters: Mitch Allan; Jason Evigan; Lindy Robbins; Julia Michaels
- Producers: Evigan; Allan

Fifth Harmony singles chronology
"Miss Movin' On" (2013)	"Boss" (2014)

Music video
- "Fifth Harmony - Miss Movin' On (Official Video)" on YouTube

"Miss Movin' On" is the debut single by American girl group Fifth Harmony. It was written by Mitch Allan, Jason Evigan, Lindy Robbins, and Julia Michaels, with production handled by Allan and Evigan. The song was released on July 16, 2013 as the lead single from the group's debut extended play, Better Together (2013). Musically, the song is a power pop track with a synth-backed chorus and soaring hooks. In its lyrics, the group expresses a message of empowerment after the end of a relationship.

"Miss Movin On" became the group's first song to debut on the Billboard Hot 100, while also entering its pop counterpart chart in New Zealand. The song's accompanying music video, directed by Hannah Lux Davis and shot on-site in San Diego, California at the Del Mar Fairgrounds features the girls enjoying themselves at an amusement park after getting over the break-ups of their boyfriends. The group performed the song several times, including on televised programs such as The Today Show, Fox & Friends, and Live! with Kelly and Michael.

== Background and release ==
The main producer of Fifth Harmony's debut extended play, Julian Bunetta, stated on Twitter that two singles from the album would be released during June 2013. On June 4, 2013, Fifth Harmony tweeted that there would be an upcoming announcement related to the single and on June 7 the group announced via a Vine video that the debut single is called "Miss Movin' On". Fifth Harmony released a short preview of the song on Twitter.

== Composition ==
"Miss Movin' On" is a power pop song that lasts for three minutes and 14 seconds. Its written in the key of F♯ major and is set in the time signature of 4/4 common time with a moderate tempo of 76 beats per minute. Songwriting and production is largely based on previous The Suspex productions, most notably Demi Lovato's "Heart Attack" which shows similar explosive chorus, huge vocals and soaring hooks.

The song begins with guitar chords, with Camila Cabello and Lauren Jauregui belting out the song's first verse with the chord progression of F♯–C♯–D♯_{m}, followed by the explosive synth-backed chorus. Jauregui and Dinah Jane sing the second verse with ad-libs from Normani Kordei. Its bridge is sung by Jane, while its last chorus features the first appearance from Ally Brooke, alongside Kordei, Jauregui, and Jane. The bridge also has a beat comparable to English rock band Queen's single, "We Will Rock You". Lyrically, the song express a message of empowerment after the end of a relationship.

== Reception ==
=== Critical reception ===
Jessica Sager from PopCrush gave the song 4.5 out of 5 stars, praising the group's vocals as having "a hefty dose of soul that many of their Top 40 contemporaries, most of whom are a lot older than they are, lack." Christina Lee, from Idolator called the song "explosive". Lee also noted the equal distribution in vocals, saying the group "exchanged the vocals in a way that each member is heard, but in subtle and unexpected ways".

In a positive review, Jenna Rubenstein wrote on the MTV blog that "we effing loving it" and also complimented the single's "shiny, polished pop beat" and lyrics. Examiner and Billboard named the single a "pop kiss-off anthem", with Billboard writing that the "empowering track fulfills the group's promise of "fun pop". Bill Lamb of About shared similar sentiments and noted that the group is trying to create a popularity for "girl groups", and praises the song for containing a powerful ballad that influences the chorus.

Samantha Martin from PopDust praised the group's "distinct voices", as they "blend seamlessly when singing". The Portuguese website Original Tune praised the song for "undoubtedly" making the "most complete of an artist revealed by X-Factor US". He continued his review by complementing the "production" as the producers "took great care" not to make the song sound "too generic". Bradley Stern of MuuMuse gave the song four out of five stars calling the song a "power-pop empowerment anthem". Stern also praised the "huge vocals", "soaring hooks" and the "fists-aloft, fuck-off chorus." Sugarscape compared the track to Demi Lovato's songs.

=== Commercial performance ===
During the single's first chart tracking week, it sold 37,000 digital downloads and had 489,000 streams in the United States, debuting at number 85 on the Billboard Hot 100. On August 15, the song re-entered the chart, at a new peak of 83. It then peaked at number 76, and spent eleven weeks on the chart. On the Mainstream Top 40 chart, it peaked at number 27, spending nine weeks there. The song also charted on the Billboard Heatseekers Songs at number four, spending five weeks on the chart.

Outside of the United States, "Miss Movin' On" charted at number 27 in New Zealand, becoming the group's first top 40 entry as part of their debut single.

== Music video ==
After releasing the lyric video for the single on June 18, 2013, the music video was posted on Fifth Harmony's official YouTube account on July 15, 2013. Directed by Hannah Lux Davis, the video shows the five girls enjoying themselves at an amusement park together, all of them having recently gotten over their break-ups with their boyfriends. Throughout the video the girls are seen singing into vintage microphones. The music video was filmed in Del Mar, California at the San Diego County Fair.

The group became the first alumnae from the American version of The X Factor to reach 15 million YouTube views for an original song, when the song "Disarm You" featuring Ilsey video surpassed this feat on October 20, 2013. Since then, the video became the group's fourth Vevo certification for reaching over 100 million views. As of April 2024, the video had achieved over 180 million views.

== Live performances ==
The group performed "Miss Movin' On" for the first time on television on July 18, 2013, on The Today Show in New York City. While visiting radio stations as part of the single's promotion, the group sung acoustic versions of the song on KIIS FM and Radio Disney. The song was on the set list for the group's mall tour titled Harmonize America and Cher Lloyd's I Wish Tour throughout September 2013, where Fifth Harmony was the opening act.

Other performances of the song include Fox & Friends, The Arsenio Hall Show, and Live! with Kelly and Michael. and at the 2014 Radio Disney Music Awards.

== Track listings ==
- Digital download (Album version)
1. "Miss Movin' On" – 3:14
- CD single
1. "Miss Movin' On" – 3:14
2. "Me & My Girls" – 3:24
- Miss Movin' On (Papercha$er Remix)
1. "Miss Movin' On" (Papercha$er Remix) - 4:07

== Credits and personnel ==
Management

Credits adapted from Better Together's liner notes.

Recording and management

- Recorded at The Guest House Studios (Los Angeles, California)
- Mixed at MixStar Studios (Virginia Beach, Virginia)
- Published by BMG Platinum Songs and Bad Robot (BMI), Hey Kiddo Music. (ASCAP).

Personnel

- Ally Brooke - vocals
- Camila Cabello - vocals
- Dinah Jane - vocals
- Lauren Jauregui - vocals
- Normani Kordei - vocals
- Jason Evigan – songwriter, production, programming
- Lindy Robbins - songwriter
- Julia Michaels - songwriter
- Mitch Allan - songwriter
- Dan Book - vocal producer
- Serban Ghenea – mixing
- John Hanes – mixing engineer

== Charts and certifications ==
=== Weekly charts ===
Chart (2013)	Peak position
New Zealand (Recorded Music NZ)	27
US Billboard Hot 100	76
US Pop Airplay (Billboard)	27

=== Certifications ===
Region	Certification	Certified units/sales
New Zealand (RMNZ)	Gold	15,000^{‡}
United States (RIAA)	Gold	500,000^{‡}
^{‡} Sales+streaming figures based on certification alone.

== Release history ==
Region	Date	Format	Label
Worldwide	July 16, 2013	Digital download	Epic; Syco
