= Better Together (EP) =

- Standard EP artwork cover; On the acoustic and remixes versions covers, the backgrounds are different colors.

EP by Fifth Harmony
- Released: October 18, 2013
- Recorded: March–May 2013
- Studio: Enemy Dojo and The Guest House Studios and Arundei Studios (Calabasas, California); Westlake and R8D Studios (West Hollywood, California)
- Genre: Pop; R&B
- Length: 18:04
- Label: Syco; Epic
- Producer: Julian Bunetta; Mitch Allan; Jason Evingan; Marcus Lomax; Stephan Johnson; Jordan Johnson; Harmony Samuels

Fifth Harmony chronology
Better Together (2013)	Reflection (2015)

Singles from Better Together
- 1. "Miss Movin' On" Released: July 16, 2013

Better Together is the debut extended play by American girl group Fifth Harmony. It was their first release after placing third on the second season of American televised reality show The X Factor, and was released on October 18, 2013 through Epic Records. Lyrically, the extended play discusses themes of love, heartbreak and empowerment. Throughout the recording process, the group worked with a variety of music producers including Savan Kotecha and Harmony Samuels as well as Julian Bunetta who served as the executive producer of the extended play. Better Together is primarily a pop and R&B record with elements of funk, pop rock, power pop, dance, bubblegum pop, acoustic guitar, teen pop and minimalist urban influences.

Following the release of Better Together, two Spanish language versions of the extended play, Juntos and Juntos Acoustic, were both released to digital music stores on November 8, 2013, while a physical bundle of both versions packaged together was released exclusively at Walmart on November 11, 2013. An acoustic version of Better Together was released to digital music stores on four days later, with physical copies sold exclusively at Justice stores. All together it managed to sell 51k copies on the first week. Finally, a remix extended play was released exclusively to iTunes on November 25, 2013. A four disc Better Together: Deluxe Edition set started selling exclusively on Fifth Harmony's official store on December 3, 2013, consisting of the standard five-track extended play, along with Better Together: Acoustic, Juntos, Juntos Acoustic and a card to download the remix extended play.

The extended play is preceded by the single "Miss Movin' On" which peaked at number 76 on the Billboard Hot 100. Better Together debuted at number six on the Billboard 200. A song that was not on the album but was promoted on the group's Harmonize America tour was "Tellin' Me". The extended play was also promoted via the promotional singles "Me & My Girls" and the title track, "Better Together". The iTunes edition available for digital download also included "Me & My Girls" alongside the five tracks found on the standard edition, and the Target edition came with the bonus track "One Wish".

== Background ==
On October 18, 2013, Fifth Harmony spoke about the extended play in an exclusive interview, saying "It's definitely going to sound different. All of the songs have a common thread – they're all a genre of pop, we’ve got a ballad in there. There's an 80's song in there, they all sound really different, but there is a connection there".

== Music and lyrics ==
"Miss Movin' On"
A sound sample from "Miss Movin' On", it was the only song released as single. Musically, the song incorporated a power pop chorus, lyrically it express empowerment. The song is an example of the diversity of music styles present in its production.

Better Together features five different tracks and consists mainly of pop and R&B musical genres that explores '80s-inspired dance-pop, pop rock, minimal urban music and bubblegum pop. The members of Fifth Harmony cowrote the songs "Don't Wanna Dance Alone", "Who Are You", and "Me & My Girls".

The extended play opens with the '80's-inspired track "Don't Wanna Dance Alone" which has an uptempo dance beat and incorporates elements of funk music. The song gained comparisons to Whitney Houston's I Wanna Dance with Somebody (Who Loves Me) for having a similar message and upbeat sound.

The second track is the lead single "Miss Movin' On", whose lyrical content delivers a message of empowerment by expressing the feeling of "moving on from a relationship". As noted by David Greenwold from Billboard, the "empowering track fulfills the group's promise of "fun pop". Sugarscape compared the track to the musical style of Demi Lovato. It has a power pop-influenced chorus.

The title track "Better Together" is a throwback R&B-pop song, with critics comparing its sound to the musical style of Mariah Carey and Ariana Grande. The fourth track "Who Are You" is the only ballad present in the extended play, containing a slow piano melody and strings harmonizing around. The last track "Leave My Heart Out Of This" is a pop rock song with acoustic guitar during the first verses and a breakdown, receiving comparisons to Demi Lovato's "Heart Attack".

== Promotion ==
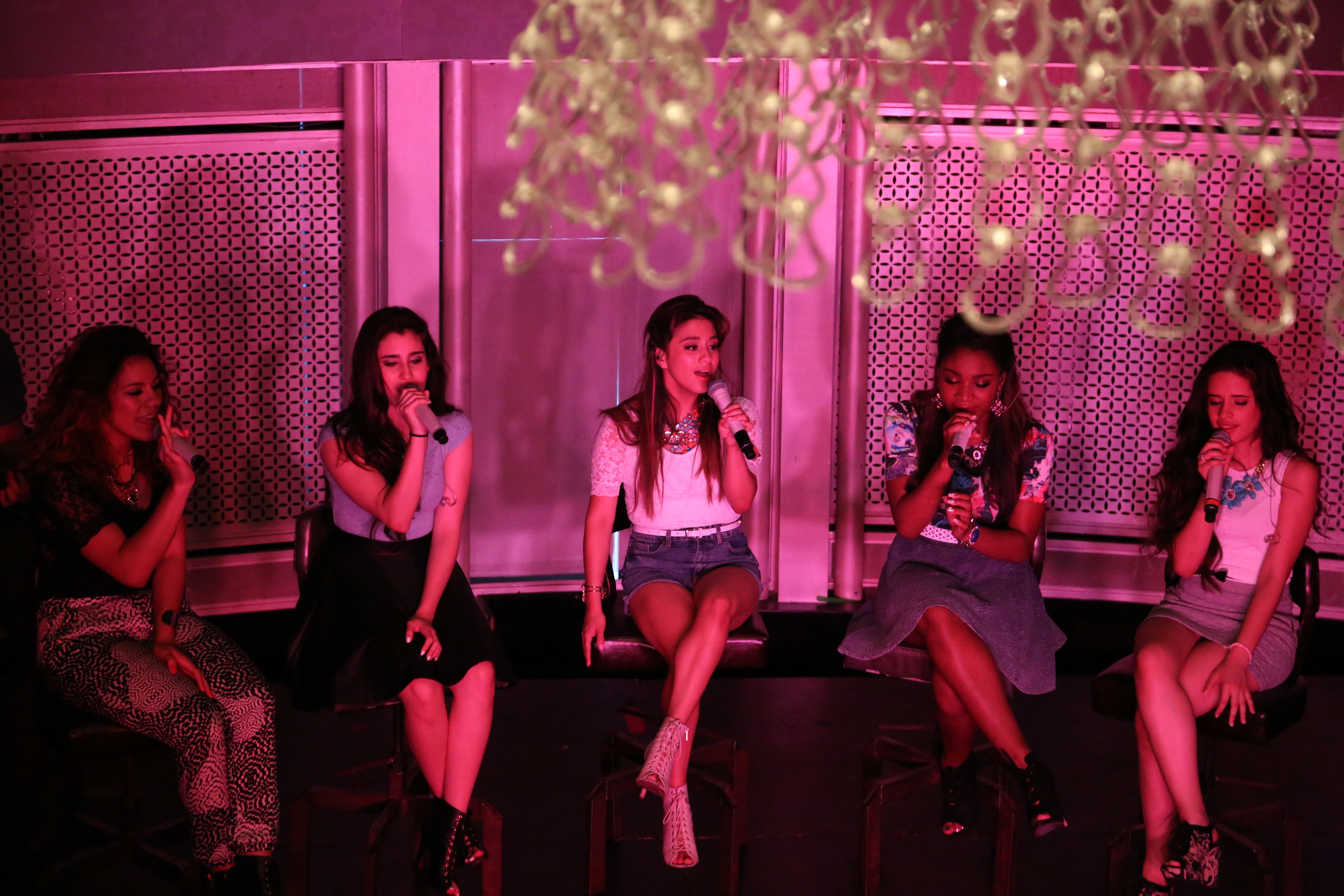
Fifth Harmony at Hollywood & Highland Center on August 16, 2013

The group served as one of the opening acts for Cher Lloyd's I Wish Tour which commenced on September 6, 2013. All of the songs appearing on the extended play were performed as part of their setlist, including bonus tracks that appear on the iTunes and Target versions. On the day of the release of Better Together, Fifth Harmony were interviewed during a 30-minute "Live from MTV" stream on MTV. They also performed "Miss Movin' On" on Live with Kelly and Michael and The Arsenio Hall Show.

The quintet appeared on VH1's Big Morning Buzz Live with Carrie Keagan on October 23. Other promotional visits during the week of release included visits to Billboard headquarters and a trip to the top of the Empire State Building with members of the media for photo ops and short interviews. Autograph signing events for the extended play included stops at Westfield Sunrise Mall in Massapequa, New York on October 22, 2013 and Smith Haven Mall in Lake Grove, New York on October 23, 2013.

=== Singles ===
"Miss Movin' On" was released as the group's debut and lead single on July 16, 2013. The song debuted at number 85, and peaked at number 76 on the Billboard Hot 100, spending a total of eleven weeks there and charting at number 27 on the Billboard Pop Singles chart. The song was certified Gold in the United States for selling combined sales and track-equivalent streams units of 500,000 in June 2014. "Me & My Girls" was released as a promotional single through Radio Disney and reached number four on the Bubbling Under Hot 100, number 17 on the Heatseekers Songs and number 53 on Digital Songs.

== Commercial performance ==
Better Together charted at number six on the Billboard 200, handing the group their first ever top ten entry with first-week sales of 23,000, it also debuted at number three on Digital Albums. It also debuted at number 18 on the New Zealand Albums Chart and at number 22 on the Canadian Albums Chart.

The extended play's subsequent releases, Juntos Acoustic peaked at number five on Latin Pop Albums, while Better Together: The Remixes debuted at number 20 on Billboard Dance/Electronic Albums. Juntos debuted at number two on both the Billboard Top Latin Albums and Latin Pop Albums charts.

== Track listing ==
Better Together – Standard edition
No.	Title	Writer(s)	Length
1.	"Don't Wanna Dance Alone"	Camila Cabello; Normani Kordei; Ally Brooke Hernandez; Lauren Jauregui; Dinah Jane Hansen; Julian Bunetta; Andre Merrit	3:50
2.	"Miss Movin' On"	Jason Evigan; Lindy Robbins; Julia Michaels; Mitch Allan	3:14
3.	"Better Together"	Evigan; Savan Kotecha; Harmony Samuels; Rickard Göransson	3:14
4.	"Who Are You"	Cabello; Kordei; Hernandez; Jauregui; Hansen; Bunetta; PJ Bianco; Nasri Atweh	3:56
5.	"Leave My Heart Out of This"	Evigan; Tebey Ottoh; Marcus Lomax; Jordan Johnson; Stefan Johnson	3:50
Total length:			18:04

Better Together – Target edition
No.	Title	Writer(s)	Length
6.	"One Wish"	Sam Watters; Louis Biancaniello; Michael Biancaniello; Clarence Coffee; Lomax; Johnson; Johnson	3:28
Total length:			21:32

Better Together – iTunes Store edition and 2023 digital reissue
No.	Title	Writer(s)	Length
6.	"Me & My Girls"	Cabello; Kordei; Hernandez; Jauregui; Hansen; Bunetta; Bianco; Beau Dozier; John Ryan	3:24
Total length:			21:28

Juntos – Standard edition
No.	Title	Writer(s)	Length
1.	"Que Bailes Conmigo Hoy" (Don't Wanna Dance Alone)	Camila Cabello; Normani Kordei; Ally Brooke Hernandez; Lauren Jauregui; Dinah Jane Hansen; Julian Bunetta; Andre Merrit; Claudia Brant^{[a]}	3:37
2.	"Sin Tu Amor" (Miss Movin' On)	Jason Evigan; Lindy Robbins; Julia Michaels; Mitch Allan; Brant^{[a]}	3:15
3.	"Tu Eres Lo Que Yo Quiero" (Better Together)	Evigan; Savan Kotecha; Harmony Samuels; Rickard Göransson; Brant^{[a]}	3:16
4.	"Eres Tu" (Who Are You)	Cabello; Kordei; Hernandez; Jauregui; Hansen; Bunetta; Nasri Atweh; PJ Bianco; Brant^{[a]}	3:58
5.	"Que El Corazon No Hable Por Mi" (Leave My Heart Out of This)	Evigan; Tebey Ottoh; Marcus Lomax; Jordan Johnson; Stefan Johnson; Brant^{[a]}	3:52
Total length:			17:58

Juntos – Acoustic edition
No.	Title	Writer(s)	Length
1.	"Que Bailes Conmigo Hoy - Acustica" (Don't Wanna Dance Alone - Acoustic)	Camila Cabello; Normani Kordei; Ally Brooke Hernandez; Lauren Jauregui; Dinah Jane Hansen; Julian Bunetta; Andre Merrit; Claudia Brant^{[a]}	3:37
2.	"Sin Tu Amor - Acustica" (Miss Movin' On - Acoustic)	Jason Evigan; Lindy Robbins; Julia Michaels; Mitch Allan; Brant^{[a]}	3:15
3.	"Tu Eres Lo Que Yo Quiero - Acustica" (Better Together - Acoustic)	Evigan; Savan Kotecha; Harmony Samuels; Rickard Göransson; Brant^{[a]}	3:16
4.	"Eres Tu - Acustica" (Who Are You - Acoustic)	Cabello; Kordei; Hernandez; Jauregui; Hansen; Bunetta; Nasri Atweh; PJ Bianco; Brant^{[a]}	3:56
5.	"Que El Corazon No Hable Por Mi - Acustica" (Leave My Heart Out of This - Acoustic)	Evigan; Tebey Ottoh; Marcus Lomax; Jordan Johnson; Stefan Johnson; Brant^{[a]}	3:54
Total length:			18:00

Better Together – Acoustic edition
No.	Title	Writer(s)	Length
1.	"Don't Wanna Dance Alone - Acoustic"	Camila Cabello; Normani Kordei; Ally Brooke Hernandez; Lauren Jauregui; Dinah Jane Hansen; Julian Bunetta; Andre Merrit	3:37
2.	"Miss Movin' On - Acoustic"	Jason Evigan; Lindy Robbins; Julia Michaels; Mitch Allan	3:14
3.	"Better Together - Acoustic"	Evigan; Savan Kotecha; Harmony Samuels; Rickard Göransson	3:16
4.	"Who Are You - Acoustic"	Cabello; Kordei; Hernandez; Jauregui; Hansen; Bunetta; PJ Bianco; Nasri Atweh	3:53
5.	"Leave My Heart Out of This - Acoustic"	Evigan; Tebey Ottoh; Marcus Lomax; Jordan Johnson; Stefan Johnson	3:54
Total length:			17:56

Better Together – The Remixes
No.	Title	Writer(s)	Length
1.	"Don't Wanna Dance Alone - Cole Plante Remix"	Camila Cabello; Normani Kordei; Ally Brooke Hernandez; Lauren Jauregui; Dinah Jane Hansen; Julian Bunetta; Andre Merrit	3:55
2.	"Miss Movin' On - Papercha$er Remix"	Jason Evigan; Lindy Robbins; Julia Michaels; Mitch Allan	4:07
3.	"Better Together - DayDrunk Remix"	Evigan; Savan Kotecha; Harmony Samuels; Rickard Göransson	3:16
4.	"Who Are You - Bit Error Remix"	Cabello; Kordei; Hernandez; Jauregui; Hansen; Bunetta; PJ Bianco; Nasri Atweh	4:11
5.	"Leave My Heart Out of This - Buzz Junkies Remix"	Evigan; Tebey Ottoh; Marcus Lomax; Jordan Johnson; Stefan Johnson	4:41
Total length:			20:11

Notes

- ^{^[a]} signifies a language adapter

== Personnel ==
Credits for Better Together adapted from AllMusic.

Locations

- Recorded at Enemy Dojo and The Guest House Studios and Arundei Studios (Calabasas, California), Westlake and R8D Studios (West Hollywood, California)

Vocals

- Ally Brooke – lead vocals, background vocals
- Normani Kordei – lead vocals, background vocals
- Dinah Jane – lead vocals, background vocals
- Lauren Jauregui – lead vocals, background vocals
- Camila Cabello – lead vocals, background vocals

Instruments

- Freddie Fox – guitar
- Harmony Samuels – instrumentation
- Julian Bunetta – instrumentation

Technical and production

- Dan Book – vocal production
- Jose Cardoza – engineer
- Peter Carlsson – vocal engineer
- Tom Coyne – mastering
- Jason Evigan – composer, production, whistle
- Rickard Göransson – vocal production
- The Monsters – production
- Mick Guzauski – mixing
- Serban Ghenea – mixing
- John Hanes – engineer
- Stefan Johnson – engineer
- Carlos King – engineer
- Julian Bunetta – engineer, mixing, production
- Savan Kotecha – vocal production
- Harmony Samuels – production
- Strangerz – production
- Suspex – engineer, production, programming
- PJ Bianco – production

Visuals and imagery

- Glenn Ellis – hair stylist
- JP Robinson – art director, design
- Julian Peploe – art director, design
- Joseph Llanes – photography
- Alex Verdugo – make-up
- Soulmaz Vosough – stylist

== Charts ==
Chart (2013)	Peak position
New Zealand Albums (RMNZ)	18
US Billboard 200	6
US Top Dance Albums (Billboard) Better Together: The Remixes	20
US Top Latin Albums (Billboard) Juntos	2
US Latin Pop Albums (Billboard) Juntos	2
