= Me & My Girls =

Promotional single by Fifth Harmony

from the EP Better Together
- A-side: "Miss Movin' On"
- Released: July 18, 2013
- Recorded: 2012–2013
- Genre: Dance-pop; synthpop
- Length: 3:24
- Label: Syco; Epic
- Songwriters: Allyson Brooke; Karla Cabello; Lauren Jauregui; Normani Kordei; Dinah Jane Hansen; Julian Bunetta; Patrick James Bianco; Beau Alexandrè Dozier; John Ryan
- Producers: Bunetta; Bianco; Dozier; Ilya Salmanzadeh

Music video
- "Fifth Harmony - Me & My Girls (Official Video)" on YouTube

"Me & My Girls" is a promotional single recorded by American girl group Fifth Harmony from their debut extended play, Better Together, included as the sixth track on the record. It was released as the first and only promotional single from their extended play on July 18, 2013, as an iTunes exclusive bonus track. The song was written by all members of the group with additional writing from Julian Bunetta, Patrick James Bianco, Beau Alexandrè Dozier and John Ryan with production handled by Bunetta, Bianco, Dozier and Ilya Salmanzadeh.

Lyrically, the song deals with several teenage themes, including friendship, partying, staying up late at night and references several names in pop culture. Music critics had mixed responses to the song. The song was not serviced to contemporary hit radio, instead, receiving airplay in an exclusive Radio Disney deal. Upon its release, the song failed to chart in the standard United States chart and internationally, thus peaking at number four on the Billboard Bubbling Under the Hot 100 chart. Performances for this song include Today and the third season of the American televised singing competition The X Factor where they returned approximately a year after being contestants on the show.

== Production and release ==
"Me & My Girls"
"Me & My Girls" features lyrics about having fun with friends.

"Me & My Girls" was released as a promotional single, exclusively to Radio Disney on July 16, 2013, as part of the network's deal with the group on their Next Big Thing competition. It became available for download on October 18, 2013, when Fifth Harmony's debut extended play was released. The group explained that the song is mainly "about spending time out on the town with your girlfriends, exuding confidence and dancing like nobody’s watching".

The song was written by Fifth Harmony's members, Julian Bunetta, Patrick James Bianco, Beau Alexandrè Dozier and John Ryan. It is a dance-pop and synthpop song dealing with teen pop lyrics and a small trap and dubstep breakdown during the chorus. Lyrically, the song is associated with teenage themes, speaking about having fun with friends during the middle of the night. Pop culture artists referenced in the song include Beyoncé (as Queen Bee), Britney Spears, Demi Lovato, Justin Bieber and One Direction.

== Reception ==
=== Critical reception ===
The song received mixed responses from music critics. Christina Lee of Idolator gave a positive review, commending the song's uplifting energy, saying "the seismic “Me [&] My Girls” would make for the perfect moment to break out the confetti and fireworks". Laura Plus Books gave the song a mixed review, saying it was "not the best song", and "not even mind-blowing" but overall, called it "good". She stated that it is a song she "will listen to often". The Grape Juice also gave a positive review, saying "the song is enough to turn 'Harmony' critics into hardcore fans" and called it "pop perfection to say the least."

In a positive review, Jessica Rawden of PopBlend, stated that "The girls still need to work on putting together a more complicated dance routine, but overall, the group's second single projects exactly the image the girls have been hoping to stand for all along, at least sans the stupid bow Camila Cabello used to wear". A reviewer from Sputnikmusic described "Me & My Girls" as "an ode to booty-popping, twerking with a catchy hook and party-like, fun sound this track is certain to get you moving in no time."

=== Chart performance ===
Upon its release, the song failed to chart internationally. The song also failed to enter in their domestic country in the Billboard Hot 100, but peaked on the Bubbling Under Hot 100 Singles chart at number four, and on the Hot Digital Songs component chart at 53. The song also charted on the Heatseekers Songs chart at place 17.

== Music video ==
The video for "Me & My Girls" premiered on August 24, 2013 on the Disney Channel; and a different version of the video, directed by Hannah Lux Davis, was uploaded on Fifth Harmony's Vevo account on August 25, 2013. Idolator's Christina Lee noted the video's partying visuals, calling it "dizzying". John Walker of MTV called the video "goofy", "super cute", "super fun" and referred to the group's bond as "super sisterly". In a behind the scenes clip, Normani stated that the song started as a "joke". It was mean to be that the life of a pop star is "not all games."

=== Synopsis ===
Critics noted the colorful visuals in the video which some thought correlated with the track's uptempo production.

The video begins with the group's logo appearing on screen before transition to a basement-like setting equipped with colorful windows and neon lights in the background. The girls are then seen playing a game as Lauren's parents dismiss themselves, leaving the girls alone. Dinah gets an epiphany and huddles the girls together, implying that they throw a party. After ordering pizza and having fun with stuffed animals and trying other kinds of wardrobe, they grab a phone. Soon, several people are seen running towards the girls place, sneaking through the windows.

Everyone is now at a club where people celebrate with microphone balloons and other accessories. Scenes from the basement setting re-appear throughout the video, with lights flashing. As the chorus approaches, the name of the track is spelled out along with multiple light rainbow streaks as each word appears. More takes of the girls dancing through different settings are shown. Each member takes different turns performing dance moves as well. Other scenes also include several of the girls throwing potato chips at the screen and people jumping in a pool of gold balls. The chorus repeats these scenes before ending as the girls hug each other and have a pillow fight. Everything is back to normal as Lauren's parents return home. Camila signals for someone to remove the feather in the table and Normani discreetly takes it, thus ending the video.

== Live performances ==
Fifth Harmony performed "Me & My Girls" on Today on July 18, 2013. The group returned less than a year after being contestants on the show to perform "Me & My Girls" in week three of season three of The X Factor. Fifth Harmony also performed the song on Demi Lovato's Neon Lights Tour, where they were supporting acts. An acoustic performance of the track was recorded at On Air with Ryan Seacrest.

== Charts ==
Chart (2013)	Peak position
US Bubbling Under Hot 100 (Billboard)	4
US Heatseekers Songs (Billboard)	17
