= Lauren Jauregui discography =

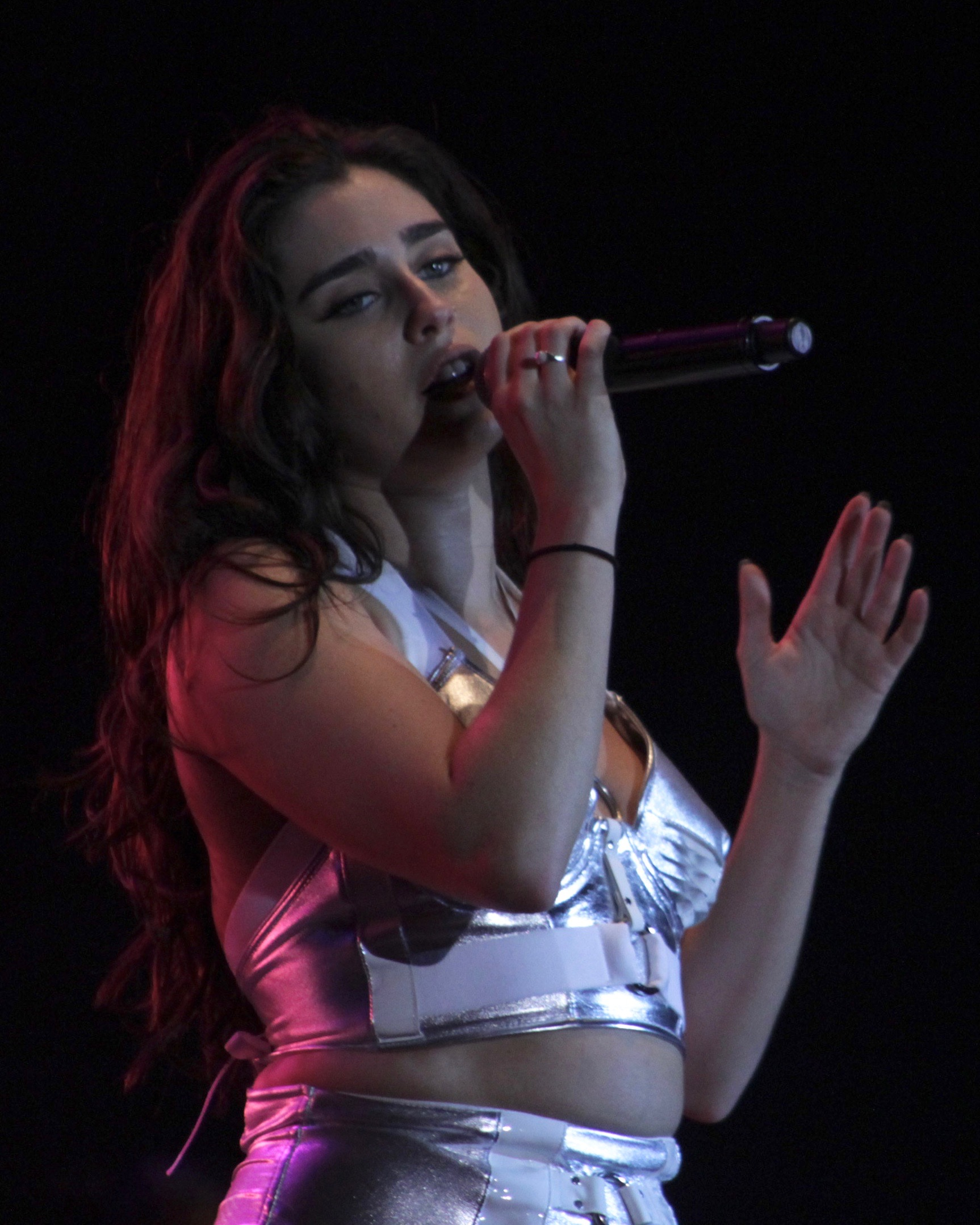
- Jauregui performing in 2017.
- EPs: 2
- Singles: 18
- Music videos: 12
- Promotional singles: 4

American singer Lauren Jauregui has released two extended plays, eighteen singles (including five as a featured artist), and four promotional singles. In 2012, Jauregui auditioned as a solo artist in the second season of The X Factor. After being eliminated as a solo performer, Jauregui was brought back into the competition along with four other girls to form the girl group Fifth Harmony. During her time in the group, Jauregui and her bandmates released the albums Reflection (2015), 7/27 (2016), and Fifth Harmony (2017).

In December 2016, Jauregui featured on Marian Hill's song "Back to Me". She later featured on Halsey's song "Strangers", a promotional single from Halsey's album Hopeless Fountain Kingdom (2017). Billboard noted "Strangers" as a "long-overdue bisexual milestone in mainstream music." In November 2017, Jauregui released the song "All Night" with Steve Aoki, from his album Neon Future III (2018). "All Night" was Jauregui's first release as a primary songwriter and lead singer. She also produced the vocals on the track.

In May 2018, Jauregui stated that she began working on her debut solo album. As the opening act of Halsey’s Latin American tour in June 2018, Jauregui performed three songs she had written, including "Expectations". Jauregui released her debut solo song "Expectations" with its music video in October 2018, under Columbia Records. She released the song "More Than That" in January 2019. In February 2020, Jauregui contributed to the soundtrack of the film Birds of Prey, and collaborated with Puerto Rican producer Tainy on his latin urban song "Nada" featuring C. Tangana. In March, she released the Tainy-produced song "Lento", followed by "50ft." in April. On April 30, 2021, Jauregui released the song "Temporary" in partnership with Sound It Out, a national campaign that uses music to help children and their caregivers have open and honest conversations about mental health. Then, on July 9, the singer released the track "While I’m Alive" in partnership with Femme It Forward, a women-led music and entertainment company whose mission focuses on educating and empowering women. On Friday, October 8, the song "Colors" debuted on digital platforms as part of the Prelude project. The single also marked Jauregui's debut under her own independent record label, Attunement Records. Prelude, Jauregui's debut EP, was released on digital platforms on November 5, 2021, and features seven tracks.

On October 28, 2022, Lauren released the song "Always Love," the most emotional and raw ballad she has ever put out in her entire career. In March 2023, Jauregui made the single "Trust Issues" available on all digital platforms. Both songs are part of her EP titled In Between, which was released on May 26, 2023. On December 22, Jauregui released the song "The Day The World Blows Up" via the platform EVEN. The track serves as a gesture of solidarity with Palestinian children and families, and it was made available on all digital platforms on January 29, 2024. On March 6, the singer released the song "Burning". On October 8, 2025, the single "Ego" was released independently by Jauregui through the platform EVEN, ahead of its worldwide release on digital platforms on October 17. On September 16, 2026, Jauregui officially released the single "Everybody's On Drugs" across all digital platforms, followed by the release of its music video on November 6.

== Extended Plays (EP) ==
Title	Details
Prelude	Released: November 5, 2021; Label: Attunement, AWAL; Formats: Digital download, streaming
In Between	Released: May 26, 2023; Label: Attunement, AWAL; Formats: Digital download, streaming

== Singles ==
=== As lead artist ===
List of singles as lead artist, with selected chart positions, showing album name and year released
Title	Year	Peak chart positions									Album
Title	Year	US Digital	US Dance	FRA	GRE	NZ Hot	POR Digital	SCO	SLK	UK DL	Album
"All Night" (with Steve Aoki)	2017	36	9	197	—	—	—	77	75	—	Neon Future III
"Expectations"	2018	48	—	—	60	—	—	62	—	94	Non-album singles
"More Than That"	2019	—	—	—	—	27	9	—	—	—	Non-album singles
"Lento" (with Tainy and remix with Rauw Alejandro or Pabllo Vittar)	2020	—	—	—	—	—	—	—	—	—	Non-album singles
"50ft."	2020	—	—	—	—	—	—	—	—	—	Non-album singles
"Colors"	2021	—	—	—	—	—	—	—	—	—	Prelude
"Scattered" (featuring Vic Mensa)	2021	—	—	—	—	—	—	—	—	—	Prelude
"On Guard" (featuring 6lack)	2021	—	—	—	—	—	—	—	—	—	Prelude
"Always Love"	2022	—	—	—	—	—	—	—	—	—	In Between
"Trust Issues"	2023	—	—	—	—	—	—	—	—	—	In Between
"The Day the World Blows Up" (Note: "The Day the World Blows Up" was released in December 22, 2023 exclusively on the Even platform in support of Palestinian children and Federation of American Hospitals.)	2024	—	—	—	—	—	—	—	—	—	Non-album singles
"Ego"	2025	—	—	—	—	—	—	—	—	—	TBA
"Everybody's On Drugs"	2026	—	—	—	—	—	—	—	—	—	TBA
"—" denotes releases that did not chart or were not released in that territory.

=== As featured artist ===
List of singles as featured artist, with selected chart positions, showing album name and year released
Title	Year	Peak chart positions				Album
Title	Year	FRA	NZ Hot	SPA	SCO	Album
"Back to Me" (Marian Hill featuring Lauren Jauregui)	2016	195	—	14	87	Act One
"Let Me Know" (Clear Eyes featuring Lauren Jauregui and Drew Love)	2019	—	—	—	—	Dreaming of Flying
"Nada" (Tainy featuring Lauren Jauregui and C. Tangana)	2020	—	—	51	—	Neon16 Tape: The Kids That Grew Up on Reggaeton
"Piña" (Snow Tha Product featuring Lauren Jauregui)	2022	—	—	—	—	To Anywhere
"—" denotes releases that did not chart or were not released in that territory.

=== Promotional singles ===
List of promotional singles, with selected chart positions and certifications, showing album name and year released
Title	Year	Peak chart positions							Certifications	Album
Title	Year	US	AUS	FRA	PHL	POR	SCO	SLK	Certifications	Album
"Strangers" (Halsey featuring Lauren Jauregui)	2017	100	93	137	90	57	45	89	RIAA: Gold	Hopeless Fountain Kingdom
"Intro"	2021	—	—	—	—	—	—	—		Prelude
"Burning"	2024	—	—	—	—	—	—	—		N/A
"Ameen"	2024	—	—	—	—	—	—	—		N/A
"—" denotes releases that did not chart or were not released in that territory.

== Other charted songs ==
Title	Year	Peak chart positions	Album
Title	Year	US R&B/HH Digital	Album
"In Your Phone" (Ty Dolla Sign featuring Lauren Jauregui)	2017	23	Beach House 3

== Guest appearances ==
List of songs from other projects, showing year released, other artists and album name
Title	Year	Other artist(s)	Album
"Invisible Chains"	2020	—N/a	Birds of Prey
"The Bad Part"	2020	Johnny Rain	EP2
"Temporary"	2021	—N/a	Sound It Out
"While I'm Alive"	2021	Femme It Forward	Big Femme Energy, Vol. 1
"Not Prepared for You"	2021	Diane Warren	Diane Warren: The Cave Sessions, Vol. 1

== Music videos ==
List of music videos as lead artist, showing year released and directors
Title	Year	Other artist(s)	Director(s)	Ref.
"All Night"	2017	Steve Aoki	Mike Harris	
"Expectations"	2018	—N/a	Lauren Dunn and Lauren Jauregui	
"More Than That"	2019	—N/a	Lauren Dunn and Lauren Jauregui	
"Lento"	2020	Tainy	Dawit N.M.	
"50ft."	2020	—N/a	Inyegumena Nosegbe and Lauren Jauregui	
"Always Love"	2022	—N/a	Luke Orlando	
"Trust Issues"	2023	—N/a	Farah Idrees	
"The Day the World Blows Up"	2024	—N/a	Unknown	
"Everybody's On Drugs"	2026	—N/a	Andrea Riba	

List of music videos as featured artist, showing year released and directors
Title	Year	Other artist(s)	Director(s)	Ref.
"Strangers"	2018	Halsey	Jessie Hill, Halsey	
"Let Me Know" (Visualizer)	2019	Clear Eyes and Drew Love	Nolie	
"Nada"	2020	Tainy and C. Tangana	Elliott Muscat	
"Piña"	2022	Snow Tha Product	SVN QNS	

=== Guest appearances ===
Title	Year	Role	Artist	Ref.
"Running"	2019	Outlaw	Arlissa	
"Anxiety (Burlinda's Theme)"	2021	Therapist	JoJo	
