= Introduction (disambiguation) =

An introduction is an action that exposes someone or something to a new thing. Introduction, The Introduction, Intro, or The Intro may also refer to:

== General use ==
- Introduction (music), an opening section of a piece of music
- Introduction (writing), a beginning section to a book, article or essay which states its purpose and goals
  - Foreword, a beginning section
- Introduction (British House of Commons), a ceremonial seating for members elected in by-elections
- Introduction (House of Lords), a ceremonial seating for some new members
- Intro (demoscene), in the demoscene, a short computer program produced for promotion or to meet competition requirements
- Introduced species or introduction, a species established by humans outside its natural range
- Right of initiative (legislative), the ability of an entity to introduce a bill or other proposed legislation before a legislature
- Product launch, the introduction of a new product to market

== Music ==
=== Performers ===
- Introduction (band), a Swedish rock group
- Intro (group), an American R&B trio

=== Albums ===
- Introduction (Alex Parks album), 2003
- Introduction (Confide EP), 2006
- Introduction, a 2010 EP by Florrie
- Introduction, by Larry Heard
- Introduction, a 2014 EP by Mrs. Green Apple
- Introduction (Marty Friedman album), 1994
- Introduction (Red Krayola album), 2006
- Introduction, 1972, by Witch
- The Introduction (album), by the Steve Morse Band
- Intro (Bravo Band album), 2008
- Intro (Danny Fernandes album)
- Intro (Ich Troje album)
- Intro (Intro album), 1993
- Intro – The Gift Recordings, by Pulp
- The Intro (Ruth B EP), 2015
- No Introduction, by Tyga
- Intro Bonito, a 2013 mixtape by british band Kero Kero Bonito

=== Songs ===
- "Intro" (DaBaby song)
- "Intro" (Peso Pluma and Tito Double P song)
- "Intro" (The xx song)
- "Introduction" (I Dont Know How But They Found Me song)
- "Introduction", by Chicago from The Chicago Transit Authority
- "Introduction", by Celine Dion from Celine Dion
- "Introduction", by Hood from Outside Closer
- "Introduction", by Kajagoogoo from White Feathers
- "Introduction", by Mike Oldfield from Tubular Bells 2003
  - "Introduction 2003", the single version of the album track
- "Introduction", by Tig Notaro from Good One
- "Introduction", by Panic! at the Disco from A Fever You Can't Sweat Out
- "Introduction", by Quasi from The Sword of God
- "Introduction", by Texas in July from I Am
- "Introduction", by Texas in July from One Reality
- "Introduction", by James Gang from Yer' Album
- "Intro", by Aaliyah from Age Ain't Nothing but a Number
- "Intro", by Aerosmith from Get a Grip
- "Intro", by All That Remains from A War You Cannot Win
- "Intro", by Annie from Anniemal
- "Intro", by Bad Gyal from Worldwide Angel
- "Intro", by Bad Gyal from La joia
- "Intro", by Basement Jaxx from Crazy Itch Radio
- "Intro", by Drake Bell from Telegraph
- "Intro", by Big Sean from I Decided
- "Intro", by Black Country, New Road from Ants from Up There
- "Intro", by Bloodbath from The Wacken Carnage
- "Intro", by Blur from No Distance Left to Run (Bonus DVD)
- "Intro", by Brandy from Never Say Never
- "Intro", by Alan Braxe & Fred Falke from The Upper Cuts
- "Intro (Northern Anthem)", by Dean Brody from Right Round Here
- "Intro", by Bullet for My Valentine from The Poison
- "Intro", by Carnifex from Dead in My Arms
- "Intro", by the Cat Empire from On the Attack
- "Intro", by Chromeo from Fancy Footwork
- "Intro", by Cheryl Cole from Only Human
- "Intro", by Crazy Frog from Crazy Hits
- "Intro", by Darkane from Rusted Angel
- "Intro", by Davido from A Good Time
- "Intro", by DC Talk from Supernatural
- "Intro", by De La Soul from 3 Feet High and Rising
- "Intro", by De La Soul from AOI: Bionix
- "Intro", by Denzel Curry from Nostalgic 64
- "Intro", by DJ Kay Slay featuring Aaron Hall from The Streetsweeper, Vol. 1
- "Intro", by DJ Kay Slay featuring Busta Rhymes from More Than Just a DJ
- "Intro" and "The Introduction", both by DJ Kay Slay and Greg Street from The Champions: North Meets South
- "Intro", by Dreamcatcher
- "Intro", by Framing Hanley from A Promise to Burn
- "Intro", by Girls Aloud from Chemistry
- "Intro", by Jess Glynne from Always in Between
- "Intro", by Jess Glynne from Jess
- "Intro", by Gorillaz from Demon Days
- "Intro", by Ellie Goulding from Delirium
- "Intro", by Ariana Grande from My Everything
- "Intro", by Ariana Grande from Christmas & Chill
- "Intro (End of the World)", by Ariana Grande from Eternal Sunshine
- "Intro", by Gryffin from Alive
- "Intro", by Gwar from Beyond Hell
- "Intro", by Hammer from The Funky Headhunter
- "Intro", by The Haunted from Live Rounds in Tokyo
- "Intro", by Hieroglyphics from 3rd Eye Vision
- "Intro", by In Fear and Faith from Your World on Fire
- "Intro", by Lauren Jauregui from Prelude
- "Intro", by Jay-Z from American Gangster
- "Intro (The Warm Up)", by J. Cole from The Warm Up
- "Intro (Skit)", by Kanye West from The College Dropout
- "Intro", by Kelis from Flesh Tone
- "Intro", by Kelis from Kaleidoscope
- "Intro", by Kelis from Kelis Was Here
- "Intro", by Kelis from Tasty
- "Intro", by Kelis from Wanderland
- "Intro", by Korn from Untitled Korn album
- "Intro", by Kurupt from Against the Grain
- "Intro", by Kurupt from Streetlights
- "Intro", by Lights from A6
- "Intro", by Lights from Skin & Earth
- "The Intro", by LL Cool J from Mr. Smith
- "Intro", by LL Cool J from 10
- "Intro", by Logic from Under Pressure
- "Intro: Looking for Their Friends", by Loossemble from Loossemble
- "Intro (A Butterfly's Signal)" by Loossemble from One of a Kind
- "Intro", by Demi Lovato from Dancing with the Devil... the Art of Starting Over
- "Intro", by Ludacris from The Red Light District
- "Intro", by Ludacris from Theater of the Mind
- "Intro", by M83 from Hurry Up, We're Dreaming
- "Intro", by MC Breed from It's All Good
- "Intro", by Misia from Marvelous
- "Intro", by Mobb Deep from Juvenile Hell
- "Intro", by Muse from Absolution
- "Intro", by Muse from HAARP
- "Intro", by The Notorious B.I.G. from Ready to Die
- "Intro", by N.E.R.D from In Search of...
- "Intro", by NF from Mansion
- "Intro", by The Offspring from Conspiracy of One
- "Intro", by Paradise Lost from Lost Paradise
- "Intro", by Pitbull from El Mariel
- "Intro", by Prodigy from Hegelian Dialectic (The Book of Revelation)
- "Intro", by Queen from A Day at the Races (part of track 1 and only listed separately on CD)
- "Intro", by Refused from This Just Might Be... the Truth
- "Intro", by Reks from REBELutionary
- "Intro", by Roll Deep from Winner Stays On
- "Intro", by Royce da 5'9" from Death Is Certain
- "Intro", by Royce da 5'9" from Independent's Day
- "Intro", by Snoop Dogg from 220
- "Intro", by Staind from 14 Shades of Grey
- "Intro", by Sum 41 from Chuck
- "Intro", by Serj Tankian and Arto Tunçboyacıyan from Serart
- "Intro", by Tinie Tempah from Disc-Overy
- "Intro", by Ashley Tisdale from Headstrong
- "Intro", by Wizzard from Introducing Eddy and the Falcons

== Other titled works ==
- "Introduction" (Blake, 1794), a poem by William Blake
- The Introduction, a prequel film of the video game Grand Theft Auto: San Andreas
- Introduction (film), 2021 South Korean drama film

== Science ==
- Introduced species, a species living outside its native distributional range

== See also ==
- Introducing (disambiguation)
- Outro (disambiguation)
- Title sequence (also referred to as an intro), the introductory sequence of a film or television program
- Timelines, that show when things where first introduced
- Category:Debuts, for things that were debuted (and introduced)
