= List of awards and nominations received by Lauren Jauregui =

Lauren Jauregui awards and nominations
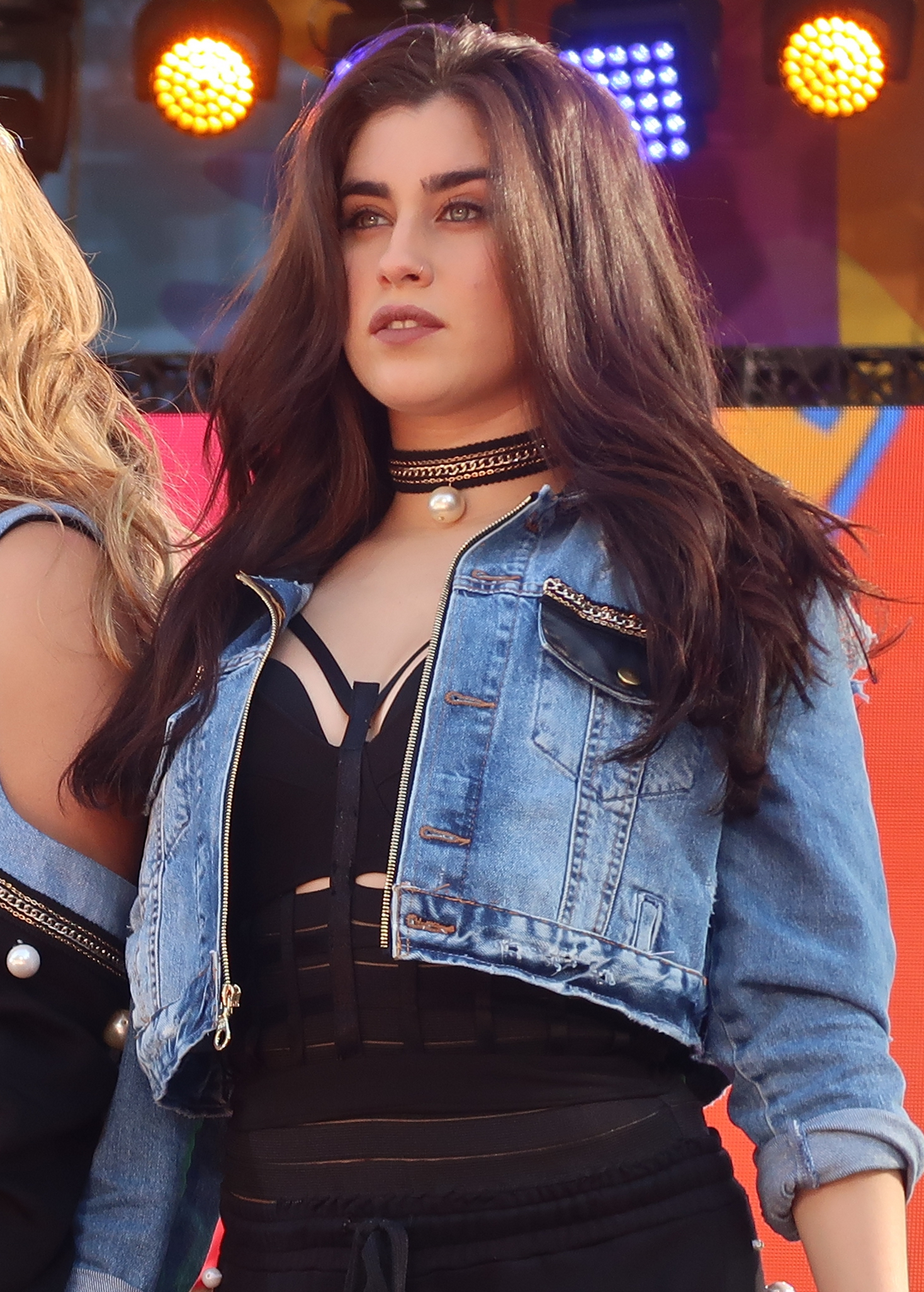
- Jauregui in NYC in June 2017
Awards and nominations
Award	Wins	Nominations
Teen Choice	3	1
BMI Pop Awards	1	0
BMI London Awards	1	0
British LGBT Awards	1	0
iHeartRadio Music Awards	1	2

Totals (Note: Certain award groups do not simply award one winner. They acknowledge several different recipients, have runners-up, and have third place. Since this is a specific recognition and is different from losing an award, runner-up mentions are considered wins in this award tally. For simplification and to avoid errors, each award in this list has been presumed to have had a prior nomination.)
- Wins: 7
- Nominations: 12

American singer Lauren Jauregui has received several awards and nominations. As a member of the girl group Fifth Harmony, Jauregui received multiple awards including two BMI awards for "All in My Head (Flex)" from their album 7/27. In 2017, Jauregui received the Celebrity of the Year award at the British LGBT Awards in recognition of promoting equality for LGBTQ. Jauregui featured on Halsey's "Strangers", deemed by Billboard a "long-overdue bisexual milestone in mainstream music." In 2018, she received a Teen Choice Award for Choice Electronic/Dance Song for "All Night" with Steve Aoki. Jauregui also has received an iHeartRadio Music Award nomination for Best Solo Breakout and won the Teen Choice Award for Choice Song: Female Artist for "Expectations".

== Awards and nominations ==
Award	Year (Note: Indicates the year of ceremony. Each year is linked to the article about the awards held that year, wherever possible.)	Recipient(s) and nominee(s)	Category	Result	Ref.
BMI London Awards	2017	"All in My Head (Flex)" (Note: The award was presented to each member of Fifth Harmony individually.)	Winning Song	Won	
BMI Pop Awards	2018	"All in My Head (Flex)"	Winning Song	Won	
British LGBT Awards	2017	Herself	Celebrity of the Year	Won	
iHeartRadio Music Awards	2019	Herself	Best Solo Breakout	Nominated	
iHeartRadio Music Awards	2019	Jaguars	Best Fan Army	Nominated	
iHeartRadio Music Awards	2019	Gracie	Cutest Musician's Pet	Won	
Teen Choice Awards	2018	"All Night" (with Steve Aoki)	Choice Song: Electronic/Dance	Won	
Teen Choice Awards	2018	Herself	Choice Female Hottie	Won	
Teen Choice Awards	2019	"Expectations"	Choice Song: Female Artist	Won	
Teen Choice Awards	2019	Herself	Choice Female Artist	Nominated	
Latin Music Italian Awards	2020	Herself	Best Latin Artist Worldwide	Nominated	
GLAAD Media Awards	2022	Prelude	Outstanding Breakthrough Music Artist	Nominated	
