= Tråd =

Swedish music duo

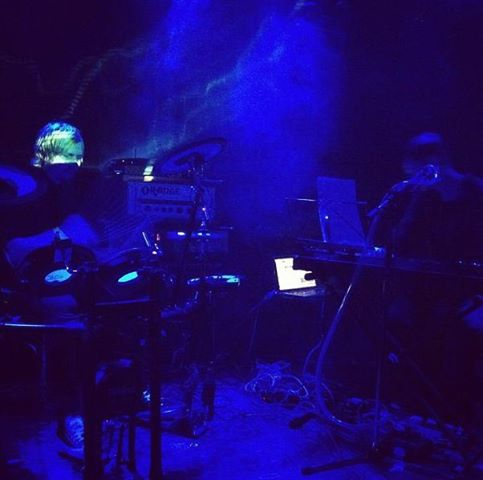
- Tråd playing at Etablissemanget, Södra Teatern, Stockholm in 2013

Background information
- Origin: Sweden
- Genres: Electronic, pop, dance
- Years active: 2012–present
- Labels: San Rec Co (SE)
- Members: Niklas Swanberg; Frank Wagnerius
- Website: www.trad.pm

Tråd is a Swedish electronic music duo from Stockholm, formed in 2011. The band consists of Niklas Swanberg and Frank Wagnerius, and their music uses compressed live drums, talk box vocals, analogue synthesizers and many layers of arpeggio loops.

Swanberg is a sound designer and has written music for stage performances, theaters and movies. He has often worked with deep bass sounds, aiming to make the music accessible to a deaf as well as hearing audience. Tråd was initiated as a creative project to combine Swanberg's enthusiasm for deep bass and 8-bit video game tunes.

In the summer of 2012, the drummer Frank Wagnerius joined. Swanberg and Wagnerius met through a mutual friend in 2000. Both were members of the psychedelic rock band Introduction, who recorded and released an album in 2009.

In 2015, Tråd composed the soundtrack for the horror video game Sylvio.

== Discography ==
- Thunder Vowels (album, 2013)
