= A Tiny Audience =

US TV show

- Created by: Maurice Keizer
- Presented by: Daniel René, Maria Elisa Ayerbe, Sarah Packiam
- Country of origin: United States
- No. of episodes: 52

Production
- Executive producers: Maurice Keizer, Christiana Carroll-Becerra
- Production company: HBO

Original release
- Network: HBO Latino
- Release: 2019 – present

A Tiny Audience is an American music series produced by February Entertainment for HBO Latino. Musical artists are interviewed and perform in front of a small group of fans. The series is hosted by musicians Sarah Packiam, Daniel René, Maria Elisa Ayerbe (season 2), and Brenda Bonnie (season 1). The series began in 2019, and a second season debuted in March 2021.

== Artists ==
- Ally Brooke
- Cabas
- Pedro Capó
- Cami
- Jackie Cruz
- Fonseca
- Kany García
- Vicente García
- Greeicy
- Alejandra Guzmán
- Lauren Jauregui
- Natalia Jiménez
- Jesse & Joy
- Juanes
- La Santa Cecilia
- Mon Laferte
- Los Amigos Invisibles
- Lunay
- Gian Marco
- Nacho
- Natti Natasha
- Debi Nova
- Danny Ocean
- Piso 21
- Ivy Queen
- Justin Quiles
- Mau y Ricky
- MDO
- Carlos Rivera
- Draco Rosa
- Paulina Rubio
- Sech
- Diego Torres
- Tommy Torres
- Manuel Turizo
- Carlos Vives
- Sebastián Yatra
- Becky G
- Jay Wheeler
- Leslie Grace
- Zion & Lennox
- Guaynaa
- Jessie Reyez
- Danna Paola
- Mike Bahía
- Justin Quiles
- La India
- Carla Morrison
- Manuel Medrano
- Aleks Syntek
- Ximena Sariñana
- Cimafunk
- Silvestre Dangond
- Jon Secada
- Robin Thicke
