= Down (Marian Hill song) =

Single by Marian Hill

from the album Act One
- Released: March 4, 2016
- Length: 3:28
- Label: Republic
- Songwriters: Samantha Gongol; Jeremy Lloyd
- Producer: Jeremy Lloyd

Marian Hill singles chronology
"One Time" (2015)	"Down" (2016)	"I Want You" (2016)

Music video
- "Down" on YouTube

"Down" is a song by American electronic duo Marian Hill as a single from their debut album Act One. Originally released in 2016, the song became popular after its adoption by Apple in an AirPods commercial.

The song started to gain more traction over the following weeks, debuting on the Billboard Hot 100 and Alternative Songs chart. It became a sleeper hit, peaking at number 21 on the Billboard Hot 100.

== Composition ==
The song is written in the key of C minor with a tempo of 85 beats per minute. It follows a chord progression of Cm–Bb–Ab–Gm.

== Commercial performance ==
"Down" debuted at number one on the Billboard Top TV Commercials chart in January 2017. Shortly after, the song entered the Billboard Hot 100 at number 99 before rising in the following weeks. The song later entered the top 40 of the chart and peaked at number 21, going on to spend 17 weeks on the chart

== Music video ==
The video starts with Samantha Gongol and Jeremy Lloyd inside an elevator with walls covered with pink flowers. Samantha sings her verse as the elevator keeps going down. Next elevator comes with Samantha inside and Jeremy on the roof of elevator playing keyboard. As the video goes on, both Samantha and Jeremy are shown changing elevators and walking via lobby. In the end both faces anti gravity as the elevator goes down in a high speed as its rope is cut off.

== Charts ==
=== Weekly charts ===
Chart (2017)	Peak position
Australia (ARIA)	55
Belgium (Ultratip Bubbling Under Flanders)	41
Belgium (Ultratip Bubbling Under Wallonia)	12
Canada Hot 100 (Billboard)	42
France (SNEP)	14
Germany (GfK)	67
Switzerland (Schweizer Hitparade)	59
US Billboard Hot 100	21
US Adult Pop Airplay (Billboard)	20
US Alternative Airplay (Billboard)	16
US Pop Airplay (Billboard)	10

=== Year-end charts ===
Chart (2017)	Position
US Billboard Hot 100	90
US Mainstream Top 40 (Billboard)	48

== Certifications ==
Region	Certification	Certified units/sales
Australia (ARIA)	Gold	35,000^{‡}
France (SNEP)	Gold	66,666^{‡}
New Zealand (RMNZ)	Gold	15,000^{‡}
United States (RIAA)	2× Platinum	2,000,000^{‡}
^{‡} Sales+streaming figures based on certification alone.
