= Introducing =

Introducing or Introducing... may refer to:

== Albums ==
- Introducing (Foxy Shazam album), 2008
- Introducing... The Beatles, 1964
- Introducing... Mari Hamada, 1993
- Introducing...Rubén González, 1997
- Introducing ... Talk Talk, 2003
- Introducing...the Best Of, by Montt Mardié, 2009
- Introducing, by Laura Fygi, 1991
- Introducing, by Bombay Rockers, 2003

== EPs ==
- Introducing (EP), by Zara Larsson, 2013
- Introducing... Belle & Sebastian, 2008
- Introducing... Ricky Fanté, by Ricky Fanté, 2003

== Other uses ==
- Introducing... (book series), a series of graphic guides to philosophy and science
- BBC Music Introducing, a radio programme
- "and introducing", a designation used for billing (performing arts)

== See also ==
- Endtroducing.....
- Introduction (disambiguation)
