= Extro =

Extro may refer to:

- Extro, an alternative term for Outro
- Extro (novel), an alternative title for The Computer Connection by Alfred Bester
