= Lauren Jauregui =

American singer-songwriter (born 1996)

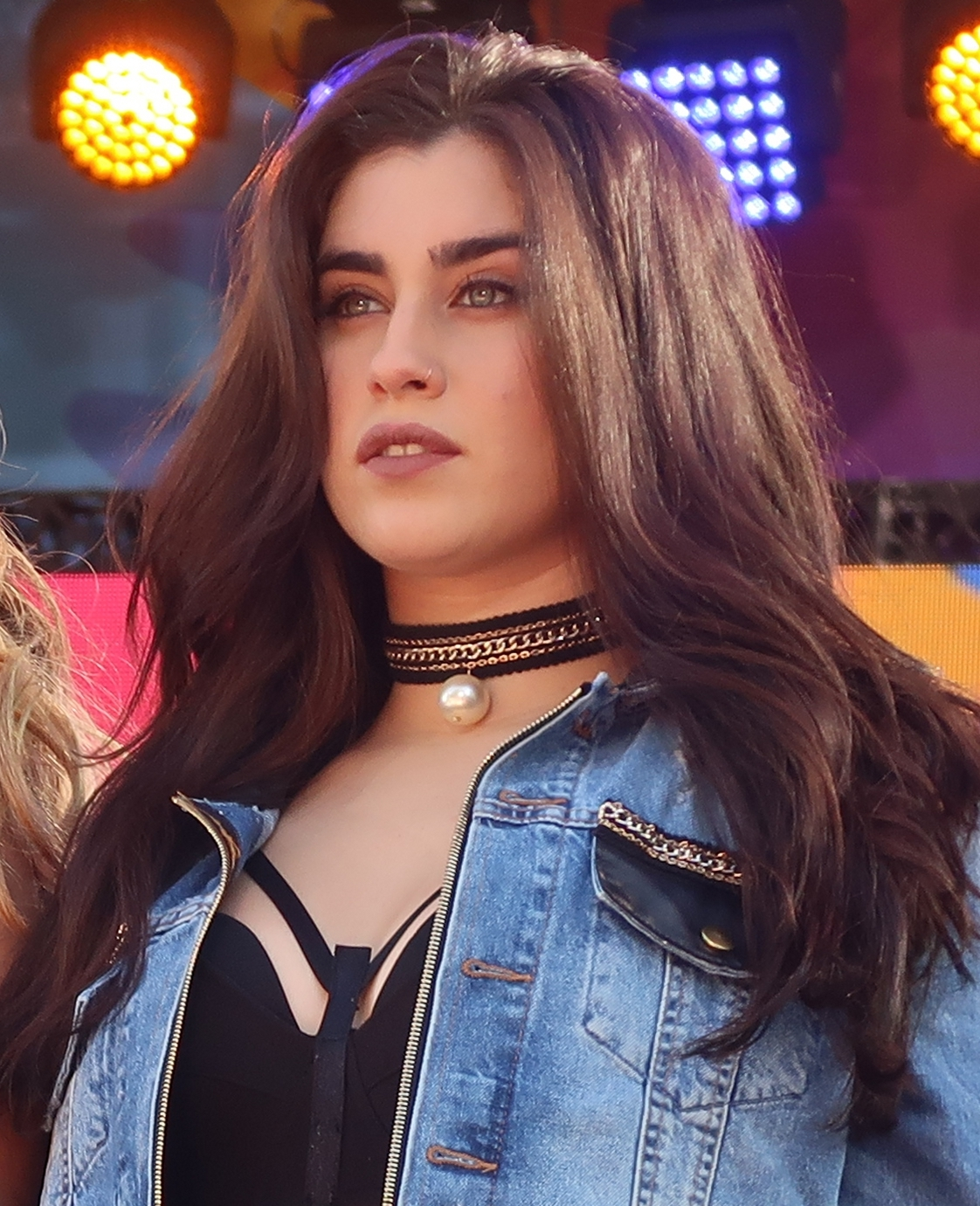
- Jauregui in 2017
- Born: Lauren Michelle Jauregui Morgado; June 27, 1996 (age 30); Miami, Florida, U.S.
- Occupations: Singer; songwriter
- Years active: 2011–present
- Works: Discography (Note: For her works with Fifth Harmony, see Fifth Harmony discography and List of songs recorded by Fifth Harmony)
- Awards: Full list
- Musical career
- Genres: Pop; reggaeton; alternative; R&B
- Labels: Epic; Syco; Columbia; Attunement Records/AWAL
- Formerly of: Fifth Harmony
- Website: laurenjauregui.com

Signature
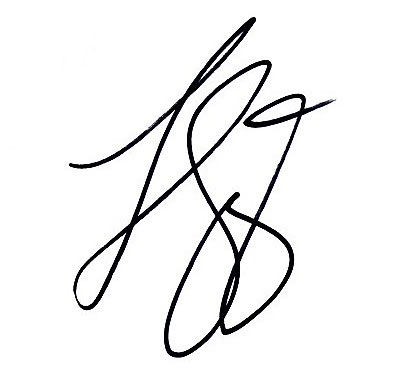

Lauren Michelle Jauregui Morgado (/ˈhaʊrɛɡi/; born June 27, 1996) is an American singer and songwriter. She rose to prominence as a member of the girl group Fifth Harmony, which became one of the best-selling girl groups of all time. Jauregui began experimenting with different sounds and exploring solo songwriting, collaborating on songs with Marian Hill, Steve Aoki and Halsey. She signed to Columbia Records to release her debut solo single "Expectations" in October 2018.

Jauregui independently released her debut solo extended play (EP) Prelude (2021), and its follow up, In Between (2023). She participated in the 34th edition of the competition series Dancing with the Stars in 2025.

== Early life ==
Jauregui was born on June 27, 1996, in Miami, Florida, to Cuban parents Michael Jauregui and Clara Morgado. Her father is a plant manager, and her mother is a teacher, who moved to the United States when Fidel Castro came to power. The eldest of three siblings, Jauregui attended a co-ed Catholic school from pre-K through sixth grade. She then attended Carrollton School of the Sacred Heart, an all-girls Catholic college preparatory school in Miami, on academic scholarship. She was in the international baccalaureate program of the school, and participated in the talent show and softball team. Throughout her school years, Jauregui expressed herself through the arts, while she enjoyed "constantly creating", singing, writing, dancing, choreographing, playing piano and painting.

== Career ==
=== 2012–2018: The X Factor and Fifth Harmony ===
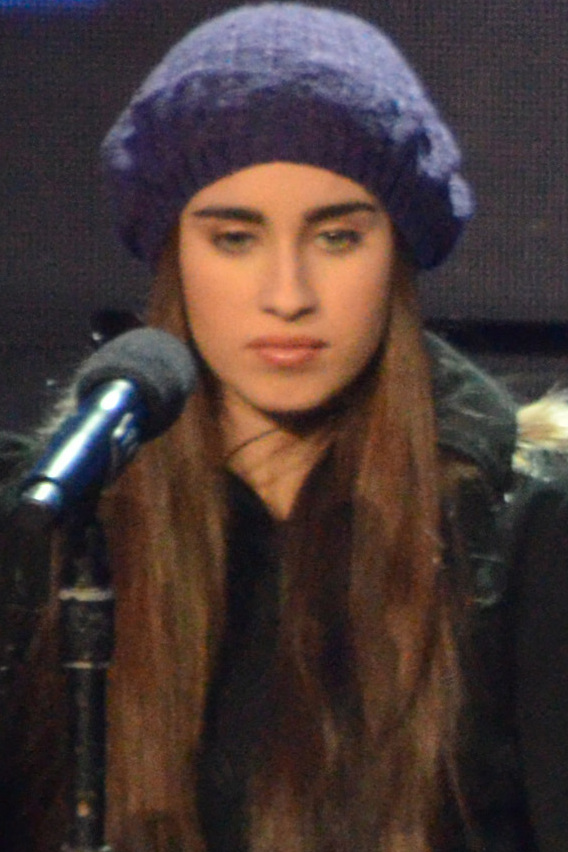
Jauregui (age 16) on The X Factor, as a member of Fifth Harmony (2012).

In 2012, at the age of 15, Jauregui auditioned for the second season of The X Factor U.S.. After four rounds of preliminary auditions, she was called back at the age of 16 for the televised audition in front of the judges. Jauregui performed "If I Ain't Got You" by Alicia Keys for her audition. Judge Antonio Reid described Jauregui's voice as "husky, round, mature" and her audition as "perfect". She advanced to the next round after getting approval from all four of the judges. During the second round of bootcamp, she was put up against country group Sister C with the song "These Arms of Mine". After being eliminated as a solo artist in the competition, Jauregui was brought back and put into a group alongside Ally Brooke, Normani, Dinah Jane, and Camila Cabello, which would later become Fifth Harmony. The group made it to the finale and finished third in the competition.

In January 2013, Fifth Harmony was signed to Simon Cowell's label Syco Music and L.A. Reid's Epic Records. Jauregui dropped out of school to work with Fifth Harmony, and later received her high school diploma through homeschooling. The group released their debut EP Better Together in October 2013. Their debut album Reflection was released in January 2015. Jauregui did not participate in promotion for the release of Reflection as her grandmother died the day of the album's release and her bandmates recommended she head to Florida. The album's third single "Worth It" peaked at number 12 on the Billboard Hot 100, their highest peak yet on the chart. The group also contributed the song "I'm in Love with a Monster" to the soundtrack of the animated film Hotel Transylvania 2 (2015). In December 2015, Fifth Harmony was honored as "Group of the Year" at the Billboard Women in Music ceremony.

Fifth Harmony's second album 7/27 was released in May 2016. "Work From Home", the album's lead single, peaked at number four on the Billboard Hot 100, and reached the top 10 in several international charts. "Work From Home" became the first song from a girl group to reach the top 10 of the Billboard Hot 100 in eight years. The group's third album, Fifth Harmony, their first as a foursome after Cabello's departure in December 2016, was released in August 2017. The album marked the first time the group was able to co-write and have agency over the creative direction of an album. In March 2018, the group announced their decision to take an indefinite hiatus to grow as individual artists and pursue solo ambitions.

=== 2016–2021: Solo projects and collaborations ===
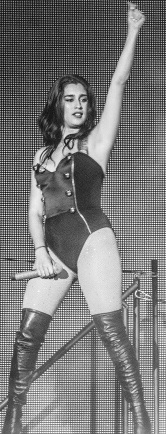
Lauren Jauregui (2016; age 20).

After the release of the group's second album, Jauregui continued with Fifth Harmony and began exploring solo songwriting, while the other members also worked on solo projects outside the group. In December 2016, she collaborated with Marian Hill on their song "Back to Me", Jauregui's first release outside of Fifth Harmony. Jauregui said that being able to "form a genuine connection" with the duo and write for the song was an "honor", while it gave "a snippet of my vibe for the first time in collaboration with them". Samantha Gongol of Marian Hill said that the duo and Jauregui had been wanting to work together since they met at one of Marian Hill's shows over a year earlier, and they completed the song with her in a brief period she had outside her tight schedule with Fifth Harmony. Jeremy Lloyd of Marian Hill said that Jauregui told them she had written her verse about five minutes before she was going to record it, and she "nailed the rhyme scheme and did so probably quicker and more deftly than we could have done". Lloyd also complimented the harmonies Jauregui wrote, saying that she has "an amazing harmonic ear". At the end of 2016, Jauregui was voted as the sexiest woman in AfterEllen's top 100 list of the year.

In May 2017, Jauregui was voted by the public as "Celebrity of the Year" at the British LGBT Awards in recognition of promoting equality for LGBTQ. Jauregui featured on Halsey's song "Strangers", which Billboard noted as a "long-overdue bisexual milestone in mainstream music." Halsey specifically chose Jauregui, who is openly bisexual, for the track, saying: "I just love that Lauren and I are just two women who have a mainstream pop presence doing a love song for the LGBTQ community." Jauregui featured on Ty Dolla Sign's song "In Your Phone" from his album Beach House 3 (2017). The album track peaked at number 23 on the U.S. R&B/Hip-Hop Digital Song Sales chart. Jauregui also recorded "All Night" with Steve Aoki, released in November 2017, from his album Neon Future III (2018). "All Night" was Jauregui's first release as a primary songwriter and lead singer. She also produced the vocals on the track. Aoki said of collaborating with Jauregui: "She's got so many ideas ... She's very meticulous. The attention to detail Lauren has is something I don't find in many people. ... She's got those ears, the sensibility and the vision". Jauregui said that her collaborative projects outside the group are a "chance to explore myself and discover who I am as an individual artist", and an exploration working with different artists, "seeing what it is that we create together". In January 2018, it was reported that she would be signing to Columbia Records for her future solo work.

In May 2018, Jauregui stated that she began working on solo music and visuals. She previously expressed in March 2018 that she has been exploring and getting "in touch" with herself creatively, and does not want to give herself "boundaries", adding that she is influenced by various genres, including electronica, pop, rock 'n roll, alternative rock and Latin music. In June 2018, Jauregui was the opening act for Halsey's Latin American leg of her Hopeless Fountain Kingdom World Tour. In the tour with Halsey, Jauregui performed three songs she had written, "Toy", "Inside" and "Expectations". In September 2018, Jauregui said she has been composing instrumentation vocally and playing it on the piano. She has no set date for her album release as she is "really trying to let it be as organic as possible" and it will be released when she feels like it is ready. Jauregui said she writes all of her songs. Jauregui released her debut solo single "Expectations" with its accompanying music video on October 24, 2018, under Columbia Records. Of her creative process, Jauregui said:

I'm trying to be as organic as possible. I write when I feel like it – I don't try to force a song ... There's a lot of inspiration around me, so I've been drawing from whatever I can – mostly life experiences, or things I wish to experience ... Art is a self-care medium for me – delving in and expressing myself however it is my heart is feeling at that moment ... I'm also very intricately involved in every aspect of bringing each song to life – the video ideas, developing the concepts, the whole editing process.

In November 2018, Jauregui performed two new songs, "More Than That" and "Freedom", at MTV's Plus 1 The Vote Election Party. Jauregui released "More Than That" on January 11, 2019. It was reported in April 2019 that Jauregui signed to Records imprint alongside Columbia. In July 2019, Jauregui performed at the Montreux Jazz Festival by Quincy Jones' invitation, for his closing night of the festival in honor of his music. In August, Jauregui said her debut album would be released in 2020. In September, she performed at the invite-only Women of Jammcard JammJam event, partnered with the nonprofit She Is the Music. In early December 2019, Jauregui featured alongside Drew Love on Clear Eyes' (Jeremy Lloyd from Marian Hill) debut solo song, "Let Me Know".

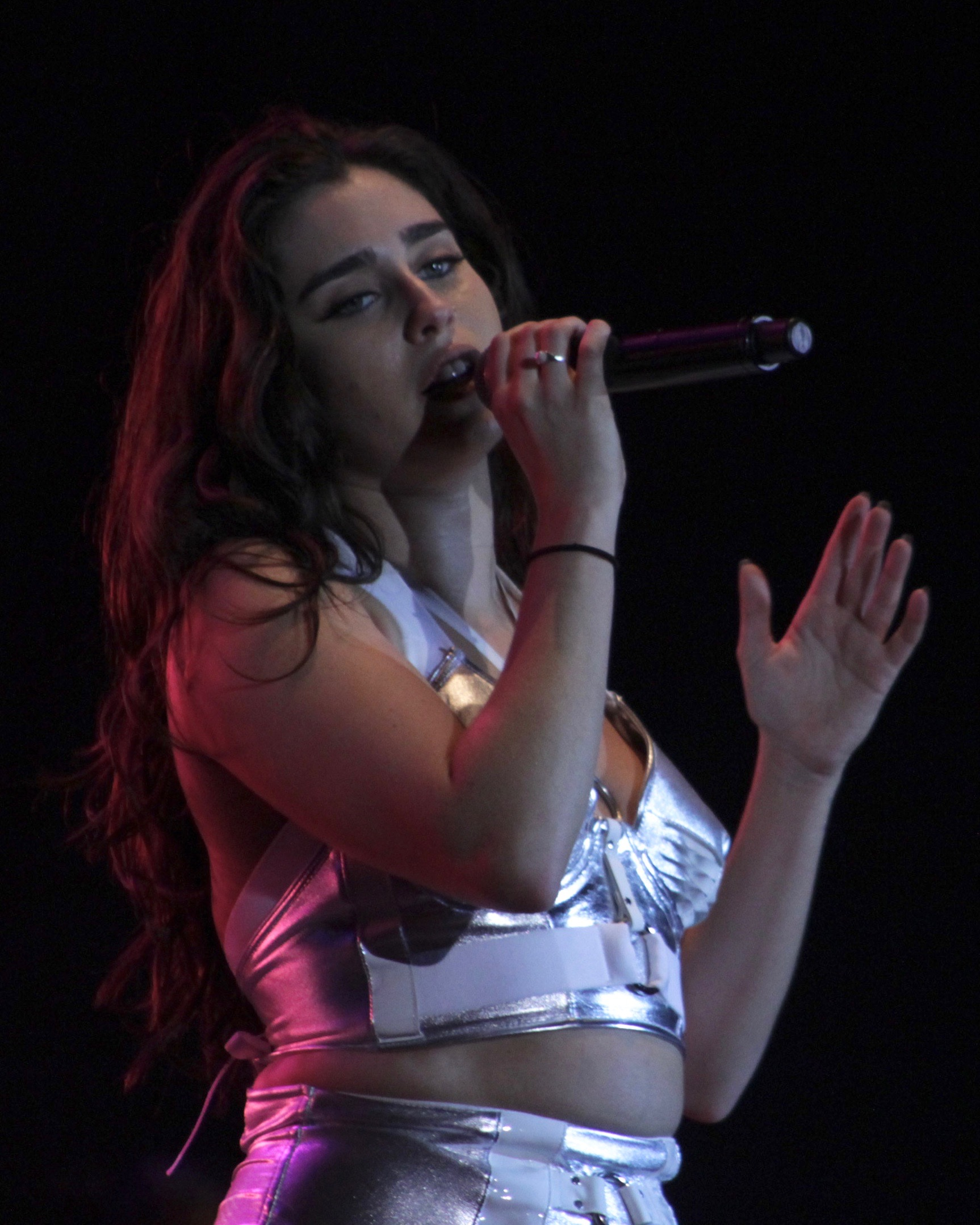
Jauregui performing with Fifth Harmony in Los Angeles during 2017.

Jauregui co-wrote and performed the song "Invisible Chains" for Birds of Prey: The Album, the soundtrack of the film Birds of Prey released in February 2020. In February 2020, she collaborated with Puerto Rican producer Tainy on his Latin urban song "Nada" featuring Spanish artist C. Tangana. Jauregui released the Tainy-produced song "Lento" and its music video on March 20, 2020. On April 17, 2020, Jauregui released the song "50ft". Jauregui was scheduled to perform at Something in the Water music festival in Virginia Beach in April 2020, and at the inaugural Virgin Fest in Los Angeles in June, however both festivals were postponed to 2021 due to the COVID-19 pandemic. In March 2020, Jauregui participated in Billboard's Live At-Home Concert to raise funds for coronavirus disease relief. She joined Global Citizen and the World Health Organization's Together at Home campaign series, for which she performed and spoke to raise awareness and funds for the coronavirus disease pandemic. Jauregui featured on "The Bad Part" from Johnny Rain's EP2, released on September 11, 2020. Colombian group ChocQuibTown collaborated with Jauregui on two songs from their upcoming album.

In April 2021, Jauregui partnered with Ad Council's Sound It Out campaign, which encourages students and their caregivers to have honest conversations about mental health. She wrote the song "Temporary" for the initiative's EP, in honor of a conversation she had with a young student. In July, Jauregui contributed the song "While I'm Alive" to the all-female album Big Femme Energy Vol. 1 from female-led entertainment company Femme It Forward, which focuses on celebrating and empowering women and bringing more inclusivity in the music industry. Jauregui performed the song "Not Prepared For You" for Diane Warren's debut album The Cave Sessions, Vol. 1, released in August 2021. The following month, Jauregui announced on her social networks that she is an ambassador for Rihanna's Savage X Fenty lingerie brand.

=== 2021–present: Prelude and In Between ===
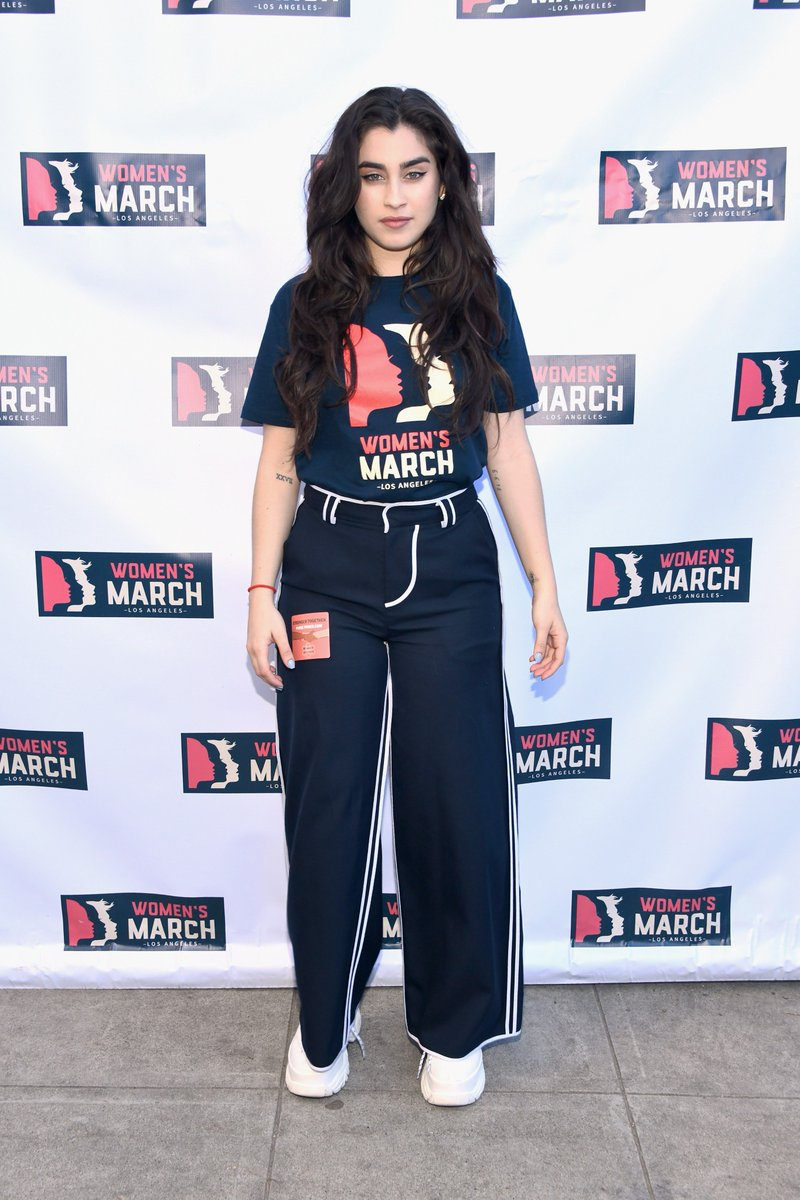
Jauregui (age 23) at the Women's March (2019).

Regarding her first solo album, it was scheduled to be released in 2020, but due to the COVID-19 pandemic, it was postponed to 2021. On September 15, 2021, Jauregui announced her debut solo project, Prelude, and a livestream performance via Moment House scheduled for October 14 and 15. She released the tracks "Colors" and "Scattered", featuring Vic Mensa, in October. On November 3, Jauregui released the track "On Guard", featuring singer 6lack. Prelude was released on November 5, 2021, via her independent record label Attunement Records. She also debuted a podcast, titled Attunement, in partnership with Patreon in March 2022.

In April 2022 it was announced that Jauregui would be supporting American singer Banks on the North American leg of her Serpentina Tour in July and August 2022. On June 1, Jauregui announced that her tour, An Evening With Lauren Jauregui, would also extend to South America, passing through Brazil, Chile and Argentina in October. In September, the song "Piña" debuted on digital platforms as a partnership between Jauregui and rapper Snow Tha Product. On Friday (September 30), for logistical reasons, Lauren informed through her social networks that the shows in South America had been postponed to March 2023, in addition to adding Mexico, Colombia, Peru and the Dominican Republic to the list. country list. On October 28, Jauregui released the song "Always Love", the most emotional and raw ballad that the singer has released in all her career years. On March 31, 2023, the single "Trust Issues" was released. Both songs are part of the singer's new EP, entitled In Between, which had seven tracks and was released on May 26, 2023.

On December 22, 2023, Jauregui released the song "The Day the World Blows Up" on the EVEN platform. The singer reported that a portion of the profits generated from the sale of the song will be donated to MECA (Middle East Children's Alliance) in support of Palestinian children, and to FAH (Food Against Hunger) which provides financial assistance to Sudanese families in Egypt. Jauregui released the single "Burning", described as "an ode to my queerness and the unapologetic nature with which I embrace it regardless of my Catholic upbringing", on February 7, 2024, via EVEN. It was released for digital download and streaming elsewhere a month later on March 6, 2024. On February 29, 2024, it was announced that Jauregui would be the opening act for singer Jessie J's show in São Paulo, Brazil. On August 31, 2025, Jauregui reunited with Ally Brooke, Normani and Dinah Jane after a 7-year hiatus to perform "Worth It" and "Work From Home", as a surprise act during a Jonas Brothers concert at the Dos Equis Pavilion in Dallas, Texas. On September 3, Jauregui was confirmed as a participant in the thirty-fourth season of the competition series Dancing with the Stars, performing with professional dancer Brandon Armstrong. They were eliminated during the third week of competition on September 30, finishing in twelfth place.

On October 8, the singer released the single, "Ego", on the paid platform EVEN. The song is from her upcoming debut studio album. On the 17th, Jauregui made the track available on all digital platforms. On February 15, 2026, she made a surprise appearance in Rio de Janeiro on the first day of the samba school parades at the Sapucaí. The following day, the singer was one of the special guests to perform at a pocket show at the "SeráQAbre?" event at MAM-Rio. On the 23rd, it was announced that Jauregui would serve as a judge and vocal coach for World Scout: The Final Piece, a reality show created to find the final member of a new international girl group. On August 3rd, Jauregui, in partnership with MTV Brasil, announced two acoustic shows in Brazil, scheduled for September 10th and 19th in Rio de Janeiro and São Paulo, respectively. A few days later, she added Belo Horizonte to the tour schedule. Due to delays on the part of the event promoter, the dates for the shows in Rio and Belo Horizonte were rescheduled to September 21st and 22nd. On the 16th, Jauregui officially released the single "Everybody's On Drugs" across all digital platforms, followed by the release of the song's music video on November 6th. On November 18, Jauregui announced a tour of Brazil for March 2027, with shows in São Paulo, Rio de Janeiro, Curitiba, and Fortaleza.

== Musical influences ==
Jauregui grew up listening to 1990s R&B, alternative rock, singer-songwriters, vocalists, pop, Latin music, and soul. Jauregui has said that her music is largely influenced by soul, R&B, rock, alternative, pop, and Latin music. She is "mostly inspired by songwriters" and "truth and authenticity". Some of the artists who have influenced her include Lana Del Rey, John Mayer, Lauryn Hill, Paramore, Alicia Keys, Janelle Monáe, Shakira, Christina Aguilera, Madonna, Amy Winehouse, and Frank Ocean.

== Activism and personal life ==
Jauregui has struggled with anxiety and depression.

Jauregui uses her platform to raise awareness on a number of issues, including human rights, education, criminal justice, election voting, immigration, gun violence and reform, harassment, and other social issues. She is politically outspoken, involved in protests, and has partnered with several organizations and attended events that work with such causes. She has written several open letters since the 2016 United States presidential election, criticizing Donald Trump and his policies, including the "Muslim ban", calling it "disrespectful to humanity". In November 2016, Billboard published an open letter she penned to Trump voters, where she wrote about repercussions of Trump's campaign and election, and stated: "I am a bisexual Cuban-American woman and I am so proud of it". Jauregui has said she identifies with sexual fluidity. She has also spoken about LGBTQ issues. In October 2023, Jauregui expressed support for Palestinian people and called for a ceasefire in the Gaza war.

From 2017 to 2019, Jauregui was in a relationship with singer Ty Dolla Sign. From late 2022 to early 2024, she was in a relationship with dancer and So You Think You Can Dance alum Sasha Mallory.

== Discography ==
=== Extended plays (EP) ===
- Prelude (2021)
- In Between (2023)

== Filmography ==
Year	Name	Role	Notes
2012–2013	The X Factor U.S.	Herself	Contestant: 22 episodes (2012); Guest: 1 episode (2013)
2014	Faking It	Herself	Episode: "The Ecstasy and the Agony"
2015	Barbie: Life in the Dreamhouse	Herself	Episode: "Sisters' Fun Day"
2015	Taylor Swift: The 1989 World Tour Live	Herself	Concert film
2016	The Ride	Herself	Episode: "Fifth Harmony"
2018	Lip Sync Battle	Herself	Episode: "Fifth Harmony"
2018	Sugar	Herself	1 episode
2021	A Tiny Audience	Herself	HBO Max; Season 2, Episode 2
2025	Dancing with the Stars	Herself	Contestant; season 34

== Tours ==
=== Headlining ===
- An Evening with Lauren Jauregui (2021–2026)
- Lauren Jauregui Tour (2027)

=== Supporting ===
- Halsey – Hopeless Fountain Kingdom World Tour (2018)
- Banks – The Serpentina Tour (2022)
