= Sylvio (video game) =

2015 video game

- Developer: Stroboskop
- Publisher: Stroboskop
- Designer: Niklas Swanberg
- Composer: Tråd
- Engine: Unity
- Platforms: Microsoft Windows, OS X, PlayStation 4, Xbox One
- Release: Microsoft Windows, OS X June 5, 2015; PlayStation 4, Xbox One; January 13, 2017
- Genre: Survival horror
- Mode: Single-player

Sylvio is an indie-developed first-person horror adventure video game released on Steam in June 2015 for Microsoft Windows, PlayStation 4, Xbox One and, OS X, utilizing the Unity engine. The game is about an audio recordist called Juliette Waters, who records the voices of ghosts through Electronic voice phenomenon. She finds herself trapped in an old family park, shut down since a landslide in 1971, and she now needs to use her recorder to survive the night. A sequel, Sylvio 2, was released on October 11, 2017.

== Gameplay ==
Sylvio is set at night in an old abandoned family park, and is played from a first person perspective. The player uses a reel recorder to record and analyze the voices of ghosts, which can be found by exploration, disturbing black orbs, disturbing physical forms, or having séances. The recordings are analyzed by playing the sound backwards, or in different speeds, and found hidden messages are written down in Juliette's notepad. On each recording a whisper will mark a place or object to use, and it's up to the player to understand what to do, and progress through the game.

== Development ==
Niklas Swanberg mostly developed the game by himself. The ghosts voices were created using voice synthesis software in combination with several analogue and digital effects. Swanberg lists the documentary The Nightmare and the phenomenon of sleep paralysis as an inspiration alongside electronic voice phenomenon.

Sylvios protagonist Juliette Waters was voiced by actress Maia Hansson Berggvist.

The attempt to fund a sequel through Kickstarter failed in 2016. Despite that, Sylvio 2 still got released in 2017.

== Reception ==
Reviews has been highlighting the unique gameplay of the audio recorder, and the game's unsettling atmosphere. Rock Paper Shotgun called it "an imaginative, unusual and frightening new horror game", while Indie Games said "When Sylvio sticks to what it's good at, it's a great, unique horror game", referring to the reviewers idea that the gun in the game was hard to handle. GameWatcher said "Sylvio's take on the first-person survival horror genre is immediately compelling and not just because of its overt Twin Peaks/Silent Hill overtones, either".
