= Neon Future III =

Studio album by Steve Aoki
- Released: November 9, 2018
- Recorded: 2016–2018
- Length: 57:05
- Label: Ultra; Dim Mak
- Producer: Steve Aoki (exec.); Sir Nolan; Jay Pryor; Michael Gazzo; Nicky Romero; Play-N-Skillz; Hook n Sling; TWIIG; Don Diablo; Lush & Simon

Steve Aoki chronology
Steve Aoki Presents Kolony (2017)	Neon Future III (2018)	Neon Future IV (2020)

Singles from Neon Future III
- 1. "What We Started" Released: July 22, 2016; 2. "Just Hold On" Released: December 10, 2016; 3. "All Night" Released: November 17, 2017; 4. "Azukita" Released: February 2, 2018; 5. "Pretender" Released: May 18, 2018; 6. "Lie to Me" Released: July 20, 2018; 7. "Be Somebody" Released: September 7, 2018; 8. "Hoovela" Released: October 5, 2018; 9. "Waste It on Me" Released: October 25, 2018; 10. "Why Are We So Broken" Released: March 14, 2019; 11. "Do Not Disturb" Released: May 15, 2019

Neon Future III is the fifth studio album by American DJ and producer Steve Aoki. It was released on November 9, 2018, through Ultra Records and Dim Mak Records, serving as the third chapter of Aoki's Neon Future concept albums. A fourth installment of the series, entitled Neon Future IV, was released in 2020, and features collaborations with Nicky Romero, Play-N-Skillz, TWIIG, Don Diablo and Lush & Simon.

== Content ==
Prior to the album's release, Aoki revealed the meaning of each track in an interview with Billboard magazine. According to him, the album is "really about embracing technology" and "the future of science and ideas, music and humanity. It's just the general overview of a techno future optimist." It includes themes from various genres of music, along with a cameo from Bill Nye on one track, “Noble Gas”. In advance of the album, "Waste It on Me" charted on the Billboard Hot 100.

== Track listing ==
No.	Title	Writer(s)	Producer(s)	Length
1.	"Neon Future III" (Intro)	Steven Aoki; Julien Marchal	Steve Aoki	4:16
2.	"Just Hold On" (featuring Louis Tomlinson)	Aoki; Alexandra Yatchenko; Nolan Lambroza; Louis Tomlinson; Eric Rosse	Aoki; Sir Nolan^{[a]}; Pryor^{[a]}	3:18
3.	"Waste It On Me" (featuring BTS)	Aoki; Nathaniel Cyphert; Sean Foreman; Michael V Gazzo; Jeff Halavacs; Kim Nam-joon; Ryan Ogren	Aoki	3:12
4.	"Be Somebody" (with Nicky Romero) (featuring Kiiara)	Aoki; Nicholas Rotteveel van Gotum; Gazzo; Benjamin Berger; Ryan McMahon; Simon Wilcox; Georgia Overton; Kiara Saulters	Aoki; Nicky Romero	3:18
5.	"Pretender" (featuring Lil Yachty and AJR)	Aoki; Adam Metzger; Jack Metzger; Ryan Metzger; Miles Parks McCollum	Aoki	3:08
6.	"A Lover And A Memory" (featuring Mike Posner)	Aoki; Michael Posner; Thomas Barnes; Peter Kelleher; Benjamin Kohn	Aoki	3:28
7.	"Why Are We So Broken" (featuring Blink-182)	Aoki; Ian Kirkpatrick; Mark Hoppus; Travis Barker; Matt Skiba; John Feldmann	Aoki	3:48
8.	"Golden Days" (featuring Jim Adkins)	Aoki; Matthew Pauling; Zakk Cervini; Travis Barker; Feldmann; Hoppus; Calum Hood	Aoki	3:23
9.	"Our Love Glows" (featuring Lady Antebellum)	Aoki; Hillary Scott-Tyrell; Mark Trussell; Emily Weisband	Aoki	2:53
10.	"Anything More" (featuring Era Istrefi)	Aoki; Cara Salimando; Henry Durham	Aoki	2:59
11.	"All Night" (with Lauren Jauregui)	Aoki; Gazzo; Michelle Buzz; Lauren Michelle Jauregui Morgado; Justin Gammella	Aoki; Mike Gazzo^{[a]}	3:25
12.	"Do Not Disturb" (featuring Bella Thorne)	Aoki; Kara Madden; Reid Stefanick; Steven Shebby	Aoki	2:43
13.	"Lie To Me" (featuring Ina Wroldsen)	Aoki; Trevor Dahl; Matthew Holmes; Philip Leigh; Bård Mathias Bonsaksen; Ina Wroldsen	Aoki; Dahl; Mac & Phil^{[c]}	2:59
14.	"Azukita" (with Play-N-Skillz) (featuring Daddy Yankee and Elvis Crespo)	Aoki; Ramón Luis Ayala Rodríguez; Juan "Play" Salinas; Oscar "Skillz" Salinas; David Macias; Maribel Laguna	Aoki; Play-N-Skillz; Hook n Sling^{[a]}	3:46
15.	"Hoovela" (with TWIIG)	Aoki; Marco Alebric; Deni Dugandzic; Joao Simaeo	Aoki; TWIIG	3:27
16.	"What We Started" (with Don Diablo x Lush & Simon) (featuring BullySongs)	Aoki; Don Schipper; Alessandro "Lush" Miselli; Simone "Simon" Privitera; Jason Walker; Andrew Bullimore; Joshua Record	Don Diablo; Aoki; Lush & Simon	3:23
17.	"Noble Gas" (featuring Bill Nye)	Aoki; Marchal; William Nye	Aoki	3:39
Total length:				57:05

^{[c]} signifies a co-producer ^{[a]} signifies an additional producer

== Personnel ==
- Steve Aoki – producer

Additional musicians

- Bill Nye – spoken word in "Noble Gas"
- Matt Skiba – vocals and guitar in "Why Are We So Broken"
- Mark Hoppus – vocals and bass guitar in "Why Are We So Broken"
- Kim Nam-joon, Jeon Jung-kook, Park Jimin - vocals in "Waste it on Me"

Other personnel

- Brian Roettinger – art direction, design
- Jamie Stuart – art direction, design
- Brian Ziff – photography

== Charts ==
=== Album ===
Chart (2018)	Peak position
Canadian Albums (Billboard)	69
Japanese Albums (Oricon)	132
US Billboard 200	153
US Top Dance Albums (Billboard)	1
US Independent Albums (Billboard)	43

=== Singles ===
List of singles as lead artist, with selected chart positions and certifications, showing year released
Title	Year	Peak chart positions										Certifications
Title	Year	US	US Dance	AUS	BEL (FL) Tip	BEL (WA) Tip	CAN	FRA	GER	NLD	UK	Certifications
"What We Started" (with Don Diablo and Lush & Simon featuring BullySongs)	2016	—	—	—	—	13	—	—	—	—	—	
"Just Hold On" (with Louis Tomlinson)	2016	52	7	20	25	30	40	8	32	27	2	RIAA: Gold; ARIA: Gold; MC: Gold; BPI: Silver
"All Night" (with Lauren Jauregui)	2017	— (Note: "All Night" did not enter the Billboard Hot 100, but peaked at number 36 on the Hot Digital Songs chart.)	9	—	—	—	—	196	—	—	—	
"Azukita" (featuring Daddy Yankee, Play-N-Skillz and Elvis Crespo)	2018	—	16	—	—	—	—	199	—	—	—	
"Pretender" (featuring Lil Yachty and AJR)	2018	—	24	—	—	—	—	—	—	—	—	
"Lie to Me" (featuring Ina Wroldsen)	2018	—	—	—	—	—	—	—	—	—	—	
"Be Somebody" (with Nicky Romero featuring Kiiara)	2018	—	30	—	—	—	—	—	—	—	—	
"Hoovela" (with Twiig)	2018	—	—	—	—	—	—	—	—	—	—	
"Waste It on Me" (featuring BTS)	2018	89	6	61	—	—	64	—	98	—	57	MC: Gold
"—" denotes a recording that did not chart or was not released in that territory.
