= All Night (Steve Aoki and Lauren Jauregui song) =

Single by Steve Aoki and Lauren Jauregui

from the album Neon Future III
- Released: November 17, 2017
- Recorded: 2017
- Genre: EDM
- Length: 3:25
- Label: Ultra
- Songwriters: Mike Gazzo; Michelle Buzz; Lauren Jauregui; Steve Aoki; Justin Gammella
- Producers: Steve Aoki; Mike Gazzo; Lauren Jauregui

Steve Aoki singles chronology
"$4,000,000" (2017)	"All Night" (2017)	"We Are Legend" (2017)

Lauren Jauregui singles chronology
"Back to Me" (2016)	"All Night" (2017)	"Expectations" (2018)

Music video
- "All Night" on YouTube

"All Night" is a song by American DJ Steve Aoki and American singer and songwriter Lauren Jauregui, released on November 17, 2017, through Ultra Records. It was written by Mike Gazzo, Michelle Buzz, Jauregui, Aoki, Justin Gammella, with the production handled by Gazzo and Aoki. It charted on Billboard Dance/Electronic Songs at number nine. The music video was released in January 2018. In March 2018, a three-remix package was released with remixes from Aoki, Alan Walker and Garmiani.

== Composition ==
Musically, "All Night" is an EDM song, with lyrics about finding someone special. Billboard's Kate Bain noted "All Night" sees Aoki's returning to "bright-light, electro-house grooves" after the hip-hop influenced production on his Kolony LP. Introduced by their managers, Aoki played different tracks to Jauregui and they exchanged ideas. Jauregui said they had agreed on an unfinished track with a "delicate side" which she then reworked, rewriting lyrics, changing melodies, adding a bridge, and creating the harmonies. She produced the vocals on the track.

== Music video ==
The song's music video was released on January 8, 2018, and features Jauregui pursuing a male lover in a nightclub and Aoki DJing at the same nightclub. The music video premiered on BuzzFeed before being released to YouTube. Billboard called the video "steamy" and "pretty trippy".

== Track listing ==
Single
No.	Title	Length
1.	"All Night"	3:25

Remixes
No.	Title	Length
1.	"All Night" (Alan Walker Remix)	3:14
2.	"All Night" (Steve Aoki Remix)	4:06
3.	"All Night" (Garmiani's Shine Good Remix)	2:51

== Charts ==
=== Weekly charts ===
Chart (2017–18)	Peak position
France (SNEP)	197
Slovakia Airplay (ČNS IFPI)	83
US Hot Dance/Electronic Songs (Billboard)	9
US Digital Song Sales (Billboard)	36

=== Year-end charts ===
Chart (2018)	Position
US Hot Dance/Electronic Songs (Billboard)	66
