= Steve Aoki Presents Kolony =

Studio album by Steve Aoki
- Released: July 21, 2017
- Recorded: 2015–2017
- Genre: Trap; hip hop; EDM
- Length: 31:43
- Label: Ultra; Dim Mak
- Producer: Steve Aoki (exec.); Bruce Karlsson; Kevin Wild; Elias Ghosn; Jim "Jim Aasgier" Taihuttu; Nils "Nizzle" Rondhuis; Alexandre van den Hoef; Christopher van den Hoef

Steve Aoki album chronology
Neon Future II (2015)	Steve Aoki Presents Kolony (2017)	Neon Future III (2018)

Singles from Kolony
- 1. "How Else" Released: June 24, 2016; 2. "Without U" Released: April 28, 2017; 3. "Night Call" Released: June 16, 2017; 4. "Lit" Released: July 7, 2017; 5. "$4,000,000" Released: September 16, 2017

Steve Aoki Presents Kolony (also known as simply Kolony) is the fourth studio album by American electronic musician Steve Aoki.

== Track listing ==
No.	Title	Writer(s)	Producer(s)	Length
1.	"Kolony Anthem" (featuring iLoveMakonnen and Bok Nero)	Makonnen Sheran; Bok Nero	Steve Aoki	2:57
2.	"Lit" (with Yellow Claw featuring Gucci Mane and T-Pain)	Jim "Jim Aasgier" Taihuttu; Nils "Nizzle" Rondhuis; Radric Delantic Davis; Faheem Rashad Najm	Steve Aoki; Yellow Claw	2:49
3.	"Without U" (with DVBBS featuring 2 Chainz)	Alexandre van den Hoef; Christopher van den Hoef; Tauheed "Tity Boi" Epps	Steve Aoki; DVBBS	3:44
4.	"How Else" (featuring Rich The Kid and iLoveMakonnen)	Dimitri Leslie Roger; Makonnen Sheran	Steve Aoki	2:52
5.	"Been Ballin" (featuring Lil Uzi Vert)	Symere Woods	Steve Aoki	3:00
6.	"Night Call" (featuring Lil Yachty and Migos)	Miles Parks McCollum; Quavious Keyate Marshall; Kiari Kendrell Cephus; Kirsnick Khari Ball	Steve Aoki	4:00
7.	"$4,000,000" (with Bad Royale featuring Ma$e and Big Gigantic)	Bruce Karlsson; Kevin Wild; Elias Ghosn; Mason Drell Betha	Steve Aoki; Bad Royale; Big Gigantic	3:14
8.	"If I Told You That I Love You" (featuring Wale)	Olubowale Victor Akintimehin	Steve Aoki	3:15
9.	"No Time" (with Bad Royale featuring Jimmy October)	Bruce Karlsson; Kevin Wild; Elias Ghosn; Jimmy October	Steve Aoki; Bad Royale	2:39
10.	"Thank You Very Much" (with Ricky Remedy featuring Sonny Digital)	Ricky Remedy; Sonny Corey Uwaezuoke	Steve Aoki; Ricky Remedy	3:13
Total length:				31:43

Japanese edition bonus tracks
No.	Title	Writer(s)	Producer(s)	Length
13.	"How Else (with Rich The Kid and iLoveMakonnen) (David Guetta remix)"	Dimitri Leslie Roger; Makonnen Sheran	Steve Aoki; David Guetta	4:56
14.	"How Else (with Rich The Kid and iLoveMakonnen) (Kayzo remix)"	Dimitri Leslie Roger; Makonnen Sheran	Steve Aoki; Hayden Capuozzo	4:13
15.	"How Else (with Rich The Kid and iLoveMakonnen) (Late Remix)"	Dimitri Leslie Roger; Makonnen Sheran	Steve Aoki; Late	3:56
Total length:				44:48

== Credits and personnel ==
- Steve Aoki – producer

Technical production

- Michael Piroli – mixing

Additional musicians

- Dominic Lalli – saxophone and producing in "$4,000,000"
- Jeremy Salken – percussion in "$4,000,000"

== Charts ==
Chart (2017)	Peak position
Belgian Albums (Ultratop Flanders)	136
US Billboard 200	195
US Top Dance/Electronic Albums (Billboard)	5
US Independent Albums (Billboard)	31
