= Intro (Bravo Band album) =

Intro Интро
- Intro album cover

Studio album by Bravo Band
- Released: October 2008 (Macedonia)
- Recorded: May 2006 – September 2008
- Genre: Pop

Singles from Intro
- 1. "Lesno Ti E Tebe" Released: 2006; 2. "Ne Bih Te Menjao" Released: 19 July 2007; 3. "Neka Patam" Released: May 2008; 4. "Hronichno Lud" Released: July 2008; 5. "Bilo Kako Bilo" Released: 14 September 2009

Intro (in Macedonian: Интро) is the debut album by the Macedonian male group Bravo Band. The album was released in October 2008 and it contains nine songs which are different by style.

== Production history ==
The first single released from the album was "Lesno Ti E Tebe" ("It's easy for you") in 2006. With that song the band first promoted their self as a music group on the Macedonian festival Ohrid Fest. The song is work of Jovan Jovanov and Elvir Mekic which made their second single too called "Ne Bih Te Menjao" ("I wouldn't change you"). "Ne Bih Te Menjao" is a Serbian language song and it was the band's entry for Suncane Skale 2007. With this song they finished third in the first night with 63 points. The video for the song "Neka Patam" made by Dejan Milicevic was selected for best Macedonian video of 2008. In October all since then present songs they released on an album. The album is called Intro mainly for two reasons. The first one is the word intro which comes from the English word "introduction". It is just a metaphor for what they present in it, an introduction of their emotions which are in one way or another expressed in every song. The second reason for the name is that the album itself is meant to be an introduction into something new, something previously unseen by them.

== Songs ==
1. "Sam Megju Dzidovi"
  music: B. Gjoševski
  arrangement: B. Gjoševski
  lyrics: S. Gjoševska
2. "Hronichno Lud"
  music: B. Gjoševski
  arrangement: B. Gjoševski
  lyrics: S. Gjoševska
3. "Bidi Iskrena"
  music: J. Vasilevski, M. Dimikj, G. Simonoski
  arrangement: B. Gjoševski
  lyrics: V. Malinova
4. "Po Godina Dve"
  music: L. Cvetkovski
  arrangement: L. Cvetkovski
  lyrics: M. Milanov
5. "Lesno Ti E Tebe"
  music: J. Jovanov
  arrangement: J. Jovanov
  lyrics: E. Mekic
6. "Ti Si Vo Mene"
  music: J. Vasilevski
  arrangement: G. Simonoski
  lyrics: J. Vasilevski
7. "Ne Bih Te Menjao"
  music: J. Jovanov
  arrangement: J. Jovanov
  lyrics: E. Mekic
8. "Neka Patam"
  music: A. Tasevski
  arrangement: J. Jovanov
  lyrics: E. Mekic
9. "Bilo Kako Bilo"
  music: L. Cvetkovski
  arrangement: L. Cvetkovski
  lyrics: M. Milanov

== Awards ==
- Ne Bih Te Menjao - 3rd place on Suncane Skale 2007 - Bronzena Sirena
- Neka Patam - the best video for 2008 on "Golden Bug Of Popularity"
- Hronichno Lud - 12 points from televoting on Ohrid Fest 2008
