= More Than That (Lauren Jauregui song) =

2019 single by Lauren Jauregui

Single by Lauren Jauregui
- Released: January 11, 2019
- Genre: R&B
- Length: 2:38
- Label: Columbia
- Songwriters: Lauren Jauregui; Hue Strother; Prince Charlez
- Producers: Murda Beatz; Charlie Handsome

Lauren Jauregui singles chronology
"Expectations" (2018)	"More Than That" (2019)	"Let Me Know" (2019)

Music video
- "More Than That" on YouTube

"More Than That" is a song by American singer and songwriter Lauren Jauregui, released on January 11, 2019. Written by Jauregui two to three years before its release, the song was inspired by Greek goddess Aphrodite and depicts a flirtation that is challenged. Creatively directed by Jauregui, the music video references Greek and Roman mythology, along with Sandro Botticelli's paintings Primavera and The Birth of Venus. "More Than That" was positively-received by music journalists, who called the song "darkly seductive", "hypnotic" and a "first-class banger".

== Background ==
"More Than That" is one of two songs Jauregui performed at MTV's Plus 1 The Vote Election Party in November 2018. On January 8, 2019, Jauregui announced that "More Than That" would be released on January 11, 2019. The following day, Jauregui released the single's cover art, inspired by the renaissance painting The Birth of Venus. Billboard described the cover as "sexy, Renaissance-era-inspired artwork"; Idolator called it a "glorious" and "literal work of art"; and MTV deemed it a "Louvre-worthy cover art". Jauregui said she wrote the song two or three years before its release. She kept her demo vocals on the song as she liked how it sounded.

== Composition ==
Jauregui called "More Than That" a "sassy" song about flirtation that is "not necessarily engaging" but conscious, and about "sticking to my own guns and not giving into the flirtation". In a Beats 1 interview, Jauregui said she wrote the song without intention to keep it for herself, "so that separation made me be more free in the moment." Jauregui was inspired by the ancient Greek goddess Aphrodite, remarking that "she's very sensual. She's about love. She's about connection with pleasure and self [...] and that was really important to me." Billboard described "More Than That" as mid-tempo R&B and a "sultry grinder". Idolator described the track as "slinky" and "darkly seductive" with "sensual beats", as Jauregui challenges and "toys with her admirers". Uproxx wrote, "over a pounding R&B beat, Jauregui teases her infatuated lover". BBC deemed it a "sassy, assertive takedown of a wannabe lover." Paper said that Jauregui's lyrics "breathe in the open" through a "lo-fi trap rumble", as she sings about her "refusal to settle". Rolling Stone described it as a "smooth R&B track" where Jauregui "rebukes the advances of showy special someone while asserting her independence and worth".

== Critical reception ==
MTV called "More Than That" a "hypnotic" and "sultry number that finds her cooly [sic] asserting her dominance". Idolator wrote that the "darkly seductive banger" showcases Jauregui's "full potential" and praised the "beguiling" production. Uproxx called the song a "first-class banger" and "an excellent showcase" of Jauregui's "smoky, sonorous voice". Earmilk complimented the production, and wrote that Jauregui "sets the bar high" with the song "packed to the rim with attitude, including ample bark to match her bite". Paper praised Jauregui's songwriting and her "gorgeous raspy howl" in the song. Rolling Stone considered it an "intoxicating" and "flossy" record in which Jauregui "asserts her independence and worth".

== Music video ==
The music video was released on January 18, 2019. It was directed by Lauren Dunn and creatively directed and co-edited by Jauregui, who also cast the dancers. Inspired by the Greek goddess Aphrodite, Jauregui described her concept as "Aphrodite's visit to Earth" while she "finds herself in a unique club surrounded by the earthly embodiments of the divine feminine". The video is also partly inspired by Sandro Botticelli's renaissance painting Primavera, in which the Roman goddess Venus stands among three women dancing around her. In the video, Jauregui's Aphrodite and three other women drive to an all-female nightclub called Olympus, where they join the female crowd admiring a group of exotic dancers performing in front of them. Jauregui is later invited by a dancer to the stage. The single's cover art, a recreation of the painting The Birth of Venus, was brought to life in the video.

Aphrodite "is the ultimate celebration of femininity and beauty and sexuality in an empowering way", Dunn said. "When we think of a strip club, it's often darkly lit and seedy and secretive and you don't tell people you're going. It's not a place you envision women getting together and going to celebrate other women." Jauregui explained that it is "about taking that kind of rap video imagery and empowering the women who do this work … each woman's spirit is captured in a way that's revering her strength and her sensuality." Jauregui said that the dancers are the "centerpiece" of the video for her. Dunn described the video as "a celebration of women's power and beauty, in every form. Every body type, every color." The wardrobe of Jauregui and the women alongside her references the garment worn by the women in the Primavera painting. Stylist Mimi Cuttrell said that the wardrobe is a "take on old Greek mythology and ethereal goddess vibes, but it was important to us that we had a [Jauregui] spin on it all." The visual design of the video takes cues from the world of Aphrodite, including the lighting, production design, and cinematography. The video also integrates some visual references from Jauregui's previous video for "Expectations", such as doves and roses, symbols that are associated with Aphrodite.

Vogue described the video as "hypnotic", "fashion-forward", and "subversive". Uproxx wrote that the video is as "enticing" as the "provocative" song. Hayden Brooks of iHeart Radio said that the video continues Jauregui's "drastic departure from her Fifth Harmony past" and praised Jauregui's performance. MTV called the video "entrancing" with "compelling visuals", and deemed Jauregui's "awesome attention to detail" a "testament to how stunningly Jauregui is navigating her debut solo era."

== Charts ==
Chart (2019)	Peak position
New Zealand Hot Singles (RMNZ)	27
Portugal Digital Song Sales (RIAA)	9
