= Back to Me (Marian Hill and Lauren Jauregui song) =

2016 song by Marian Hill featuring Lauren Jauregui

Single by Marian Hill featuring Lauren Jauregui

from the album Act One
- Released: December 8, 2016
- Recorded: 2016
- Length: 2:52
- Label: Republic
- Songwriters: Samantha Gongol; Jeremy Lloyd; Lauren Jauregui
- Producer: Jeremy Lloyd

Marian Hill singles chronology
"Mistaken" (2016)	"Back to Me" (2016)	"Subtle Thing" (2018)

Lauren Jauregui singles chronology
"Back to Me" (2016)	"All Night" (2017)

"Back to Me" is a song recorded by American electronic duo Marian Hill featuring American singer and songwriter Lauren Jauregui. It was released on December 8, 2016 and included on the duo's extended debut album Act One: The Complete Collection. The song was written by the members of Marian Hill (Samantha Gongol and Jeremy Lloyd) and Jauregui, and produced by Lloyd. It is Jauregui's first release outside of Fifth Harmony.

== Production ==
Marian Hill and Jauregui said that the song began with the two of them on a plane and Jauregui in a hotel room, and the track was recorded in producer Jeremy's bedroom. Gongol commented that the duo and Jauregui had been wanting to work together since they met at one of Marian Hill's shows over a year earlier, and they managed to complete the song with her in a brief period she had outside her tight schedule with Fifth Harmony. Lloyd said that Jauregui told them she had already written her verse about five minutes before she was going to record it, and she "nailed the rhyme scheme and did so probably quicker and more deftly than we could have done". Lloyd also complimented the harmonies Jauregui wrote, saying that she has "an amazing harmonic ear".

== Critical reception ==
"Back to Me" was called a highlight from Act One by Idolator. The AU Review named it "Single of the Day", calling it "sexy and icy at the same time" and complimenting its "bluesy groove". For The Fader, Marian Hill's Samantha Gongol and Jauregui's voices "play really nicely off of each other". Emilee Lindner of Fuse wrote that "Jauregui's smooth, husky voice finds a home on the trippy, hip-hop-tinged song". The Inquisitr's Clare Mulligan described the song as "woozy and minimalist, with a hypnotic background beat and a chanted chorus." Time magazine's Raisa Brunner recommended the song, writing that it "plays with negative space" and praising and Lloyd's "sharp" production and Gongol and Jauregui's voices.

== Live performances ==
Marian Hill and Jauregui first performed the track live in December 2016 at the SnowGlobe Festival in South Lake Tahoe, California.

== Charts ==
Chart (2016)	Peak position
France (FRA)	195
Spain Physical/Digital (PROMUSICAE)	14
