= Marian Hill =

American electronic music duo

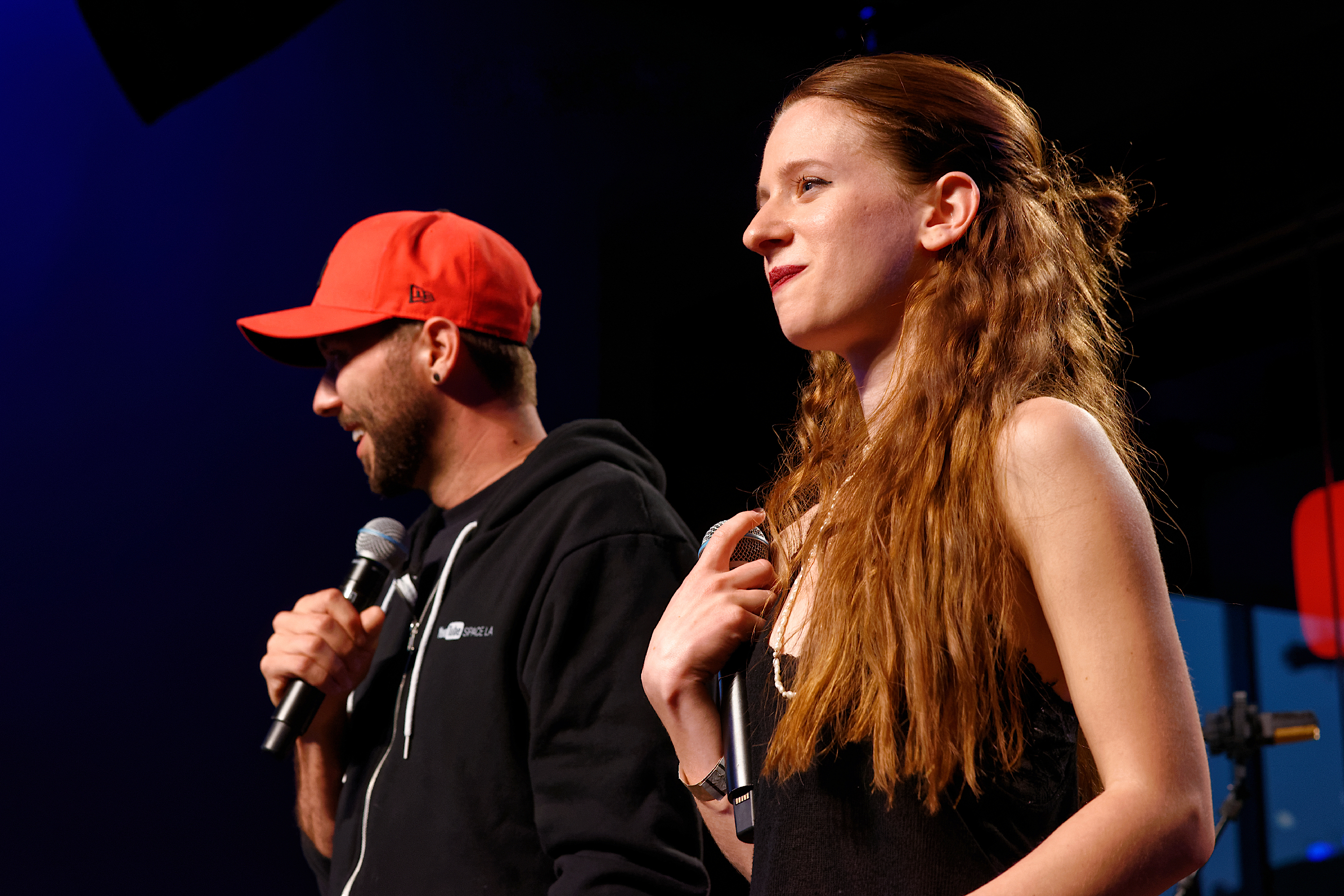
- Marian Hill performing in 2016

Background information
- Origin: Philadelphia, Pennsylvania
- Genres: Electronic; synth-pop; alternative R&B
- Years active: 2013–present
- Label: Republic
- Members: Samantha Gongol; Jeremy Lloyd
- Website: www.marianhillmusic.com

Marian Hill is an American electronic music duo from Philadelphia consisting of record producer Jeremy Lloyd and singer Samantha Gongol.

The duo released their debut EP, Play, in 2014, and released their second EP, Sway, in 2015. The duo released four singles throughout 2016, leading up to their debut album Act One.

== History ==
After meeting each other at Haverford High School, Lloyd studied music theatre at Yale University, Gongol then attended Muhlenberg College before transferring to music business at New York University, and music industry at Drexel University.

In April 2017, the duo released an extended version of their debut album Act One titled Act One (The Complete Collection).

== Members ==
Current members

- Samantha Gongol – vocals (2013–present)
- Jeremy Lloyd – keyboards, production, programming (2013–present)

Current touring musicians

- Steve Davit – saxophone, bass (2015–present)

== Discography ==
=== Studio albums ===
List of studio albums with selected chart positions
Title	Album details	Peak chart positions			
Title	Album details	US	US Alt.	US Rock	CAN
Act One	Released: June 24, 2016; Label: Republic; Format: CD, digital download, LP	42	3	5	41
Unusual	Released: May 11, 2018; Label: Republic; Format: CD, digital download, LP, streaming	162	13	—	—
Why Can't We Just Pretend?	Released: April 13, 2022; Label: Republic; Format: CD, digital download, LP, streaming	—	—	—	—
Act Two	Released: October 16, 2026; Label: Self-released; Format: CD, digital download, LP, streaming	—	—	—	—
"—" denotes items which were not released in that country or failed to chart.

=== EPs ===
List of extended plays
Title	Album details
Play	Released: 2013; Label: Republic; Format: digital download
Sway	Released: February 17, 2015; Label: Republic; Format: CD, digital download
Was It Not	Released: March 18, 2020; Label: Self-released; Format: CD, digital download, streaming

=== Singles ===
List of singles, with selected chart positions, showing year released and album name
Title	Year	Peak chart positions								Certifications	Album
Title	Year	US	US Pop	US Alt.	US Dance	AUS	CAN	FRA	SPA	Certifications	Album
"One Time"	2015	—	—	38	—	—	—	—	—	RIAA: Gold	Sway
"Down"	2016	21	10	16	—	55	42	14	14	RIAA: 2× Platinum; ARIA: Gold; SNEP: Gold	Act One
"I Want You"	2016	—	—	—	—	—	—	—	—		Act One
"I Know Why"	2016	—	—	—	—	—	—	—	—		Act One
"Mistaken"	2016	—	—	—	—	—	—	—	—		Act One
"Back to Me" (with Lauren Jauregui)	2016	—	—	—	—	—	—	195	—		Act One (The Complete Collection)
"Subtle Thing"	2018	—	—	—	42	—	—	—	—		Unusual
"Take a Number" (with Dounia)	2019	—	—	—	—	—	—	—	—		Was It Not
"Like U Do"	2019	—	—	—	—	—	—	—	—		Was It Not
"Was It Not"	2020	—	—	—	—	—	—	—	—		Was It Not
"Bonjour" (with Roman Kouder)	2020	—	—	—	—	—	—	—	—		Non-album single
"oOo that's my type" (with Yung Baby Tate)	2021	—	—	—	—	—	—	—	—		Why Can't We Just Pretend?
"omg"	2021	—	—	—	—	—	—	—	—		Why Can't We Just Pretend?
"It Never Ends"	2021	—	—	—	—	—	—	—	—		Why Can't We Just Pretend?
"Little Bit" (featuring Gashi)	2022	—	—	—	—	—	—	—	—		Why Can't We Just Pretend?
"Spinnin'" (featuring Kemba and Steve Davit)	2022	—	—	—	—	—	—	—	—		Why Can't We Just Pretend?
"I Think You Know"	2022	—	—	—	—	—	—	—	—		Non-album singles
"Back in Time"	2022	—	—	—	—	—	—	—	—		Non-album singles
"Lemme Go"	2023	—	—	—	—	—	—	—	—		Non-album singles
"You Were Always Sure" (featuring Mark Johns)	2023	—	—	—	—	—	—	—	—		Non-album singles
"Cinnamon"	2026	—	—	—	—	—	—	—	—		Act Two
"It Goes..."	2026	—	—	—	—	—	—	—	—		Act Two
"Care4Me"	2026	—	—	—	—	—	—	—	—		Act Two
"What U Want" (featuring Steve Davit)	2026	—	—	—	—	—	—	—	—		Act Two
"Everything That U Want"	2026	—	—	—	—	—	—	—	—		Act Two
"—" denotes items which were not released in that country or failed to chart.

| colspan="12" style="font-size:90%;" |"—" denotes items which were not released in that country or failed to chart. |}

=== Remixes ===
- "Sweet Ophelia" by Zella Day (2014)
- "Human" by Aquilo (2014)
- "Earned It" by The Weeknd (2015)
- "Hotline Bling" by Charlie Puth and Kehlani featuring Armani White (2015)
- "Rain Dance" by Milk & Whisky (2016)
- "Do You Miss Me at All" by Bridgit Mendler (2016)
- "Electric" by Alina Baraz featuring Khalid (2017)
- "Bellyache" by Billie Eilish (2017)
- "Curious" by Hayley Kiyoko (2018)
- "Same Soul" by PVRIS featuring Jaymes Young (2018)
- "Sue Me" by Sabrina Carpenter (2019)
- "I Lost A Friend" by FINNEAS (2019)
- "If the World Was Ending" by JP Saxe (2019)
- "Rewind" by Absofacto (2020)
