= Outro =

Outro may refer to:

== General ==
- Outro (closing credits), added at the end of a film, television program, or video game to list the personnel
- Outro (literary), the conclusion or epilogue of a work of literature or journalism
- Outro (music), ending of a composition that may take the form of a coda
- Outro (concert), recorded music played at the end of a live-music concert

== Albums ==
- Outro, by Jair Oliveira, 2002
- Outro (EP), by Highlight, 2018

== Songs ==
- "Outro" (M83 song), 2011
- "Outro", by Big Sean from Dark Sky Paradise, 2015
- "Outro", by Breaking Benjamin from Phobia, 2006
- "Outro", by Chamillionaire from The Sound of Revenge, 2005
- "Outro", by Common from The Auditorium Vol. 1, 2024
- "Outro", by Death Grips from Year of the Snitch, 2018
- "Outro", by Great Gable from Tracing Faces, 2020
- "Outro", by Gucci Mane from Delusions of Grandeur, 2020
- "Outro", by Ideal from Ideal, 1999
- "Outro", by MUNA from About U, 2017
- "Outro", by NF from Perception, 2017
- "Outro", by Ninho from Jefe, 2021
- "Outro", by Obie Trice from Cheers, 2003
- "Outro", by Pitbull from El Mariel, 2006
- "Outro", by Pop Smoke from Faith, 2021
- "Outro", by Princess Nokia from the K. Michelle album Kimberly: The People I Used to Know, 2017
- "Outro", by Reks from REBELutionary, 2012
- "Outro", by Robin Schulz from IIII, 2021
- "Outro", by the Weeknd from Live at SoFi Stadium, 2023
- "Outro (Duérmete)", by Iván Cornejo from Mirada, 2024

== See also ==
- Extro (disambiguation)
- Outroduction, a collection of B-Sides by The New Amsterdams
- Outros Lugares, an album by the Portuguese music composer António Pinho Vargas
- Outrospective, an album by Faithless
  - Outrospective / Reperspective
- The Intro and the Outro, a recording by The Bonzo Dog Doo-Dah Band
- Outreau, a commune in Pas-de-Calais, France
