= Introduction (band) =

Swedish rock group

- Introduction playing at the Kaskelot, Alcazar.

Background information
- Origin: Sweden
- Genres: Psychedelic rock Neo-psychedelia; Folk; Stoner rock
- Years active: 2001 - 2010
- Labels: Santa Records (SE)
- Members: Niklas Swanberg; Frank Houbaer Wagnerius; Martin Hertsius; Martin Hägglund
- Website: http://www.introduction.se/

Introduction is a Swedish rock band based in Stockholm. Often classified as psychedelic rock, Introduction is also influenced by classic rock, progressive rock and indie rock.

Introduction started out as a three-piece band and has gone under the names The Splendid and Giantess during 2001–2006 but then changed the name to Introduction. Introduction's original members are Niklas Swanberg, lead singer and guitar, bassist Martin Hertsius and drummer Frank Houbaer Wagnerius. In 2005 Martin Hägglund, organist (former guitarist of Rowdy Ramblers) joined the band.

In 2005 Introduction started to record their debut album, which was supposed to be released on the label Sound Like an Orange!!, but due to internal problems within the label's organization the band signed to Santa Records, which finally released the album in 2009. The band also signed to the promotion agency Caprica Entertainment the same year.

Introduction's music has received great acclaim for its creativity and playfulness and was considered to be one of Sweden's most prominent psychedelic acts by Greek 'Metal Hammer'. They have performed live on festivals and venues since 2001, mostly in Sweden and Finland.

Introduction released their first studio album, Santa sets sail for Saturn on August 24, 2009, and plans a tour 2010 in support of it.

== Discography ==
=== Albums ===
- Santa sets sail for Saturn (2009)
