= Expectations (Lauren Jauregui song) =

2018 debut single by Lauren Jauregui

Single by Lauren Jauregui
- Released: October 24, 2018
- Recorded: May 2018
- Genre: R&B
- Length: 3:24
- Label: Columbia
- Songwriter: Lauren Jauregui
- Producer: Kid Harpoon

Lauren Jauregui singles chronology
"All Night" (2017)	"Expectations" (2018)	"More Than That" (2019)

Music video
- "Expectations" on YouTube

"Expectations" is the debut solo single by American singer and songwriter Lauren Jauregui, released on October 24, 2018. It is a guitar-driven R&B song written by Jauregui and produced by Kid Harpoon, about an unresponsive relationship and the struggle to amend the situation. Jauregui debuted the track live in June 2018, as the opening act for Halsey's Hopeless Fountain Kingdom Tour in Latin America. "Expectations" received positive reviews from critics who praised Harpoon's production and Jauregui's musicianship. The song's black-and-white music video was creatively directed and co-edited by Jauregui, and portrays two opposing facets of the artist.

== Background ==
"Expectations" is one of the first songs Jauregui wrote while she was in a process of self-exploration and re-evaluation post Fifth Harmony's disbandment. She premiered the track, along with two other songs she wrote, in June 2018 in São Paulo, Brazil, as the opening act for Halsey's Hopeless Fountain Kingdom Tour in Latin America. Jauregui said the fans' passionate response to the song when she performed it inspired her to release it. She later said that she was "putting the final touches" to the song. She gave fans a brief preview of her upcoming single on October 1, 2018 with an 18-second snippet of its video. Jauregui said of "Expectations" as her debut solo song: "Just the context of it and the mood of it, I feel like is a really great introduction to the world that I'm about to give people."

== Composition ==
'Expectations'
A 20-second audio sample of "Expectations", a mid-tempo, sultry guitar-driven song.

Composed in a compound time signature, "Expectations" is a guitar-driven, slow-burning, soulful R&B song. Lyrically, the song finds Jauregui depicting a relationship state in which her partner does not appear to be responsive. It expresses vulnerable assumptions and the struggle of wanting to change the situation. Jauregui said that the record is an "exploration of when you’re in a relationship with someone and you don’t want to have expectations. But they kind of get in the way, regardless". She wrote it after experiencing something that made her "upset". She went in the studio the following the day and wrote it in about 30 minutes. She also produced the vocals. Jauregui played with double meaning for the single, simultaneously alluding to expectations on her output post-Fifth Harmony.

Billboard editor Gil Kaufman said that in the sultry song, Jauregui's vocals rise into an "urgent moan" on the "pleading" chorus, and the track's "smoky, late night" mood is amplified by its "ripping" blues guitar solo. Rolling Stone's Brittany Spanos described the record as "slow burning". The song has "atmospheric strings and sensual beat", and builds up to an "electrifying" guitar solo, wrote Idolator. Paris Close of iHeartRadio described it as a "pensive number" in which Jauregui "purrs with hope on the bluesy chorus". Harper's Bazaar's Erica Gonzales considered "Expectations" a "sultry, stripped down" bluesy guitar record.

== Critical reception ==
Idolator praised the record's instrumentation and "slinky" production, considering the song a "bold moment that is bound to put Jauregui on the right path" as she sounds "utterly at ease and highlights her compelling vocals", delivering "heaps" of personality. Time wrote that Jauregui "makes a soulful statement" in an "R&B mixed with rock 'n' roll" song "that swings and sashays at Jauregui’s deliciously languorous pace" while her lyrical delivery has "plenty of punch". Newsweek called it a "sultry and honest" debut single. Earmilk regarded the song as a proclamation of Jauregui's "ability to stand on her own as both a singer and a songwriter". MTV said the "smoky" song showcases Jauregui's "powerful pipes and marks a clear departure from Fifth Harmony's airy pop material". "Expectations" was described by the BBC as "fierce-yet-vulnerable", and a "masterclass in tension and release" by Stereogum. Harper's Bazaar deemed the record a "sultry, stripped down departure" and a "strong introduction to Jauregui's next chapter." Uproxx wrote that the song is an "impressive" solo debut in which Jauregui "sounds completely at home" and "more confident and comfortable than ever on her own".

== Music video ==
In the preview of the music video, the background features a moody black-and-white clip of Jauregui slowly walking down a dimly lit hall and standing on a bridge as a muffled snippet of the song plays in the background. Creatively directed and co-edited by the artist, the video was released on October 24, 2018 with Jauregui portraying two sides of herself. Jauregui said of her concept for the video: "I wanted to focus in on the duality of existence. The more naïve, young, innocent self, and then the more dominant, sensual, violent self, because they both exist in me, and so they were exploring each other". Billboard said the "moody" video is a "heartbreaker". Uproxx described it as "striking" and "setting high expectations for what's to come from Jauregui." MTV wrote that it is a "stunningly sinister visual" that makes a similarly "strong statement" as the song.

== Live performance ==
On May 6, 2019, Jauregui performed the song live on The Late Late Show with James Corden.

== Charts ==
Chart (2018–2019)	Peak position
Czech Republic Airplay (ČNS IFPI)	9
Greece International Digital Singles (IFPI)	60
Scottish Singles Sales (Official Charts)	62
UK Download (OCC)	94
US Digital Song Sales (Billboard)	48
