= Tate Stevens (album) =

Studio album by Tate Stevens
- Released: April 23, 2013
- Recorded: 2013
- Genre: Country
- Length: 34:39
- Labels: RCA Nashville, Syco Music
- Producer: Blake Chancey

Singles from Tate Stevens
- 1. "Holler If You're With Me" Released: February 9, 2013; 2. "Power of a Love Song" Released: March 12, 2013

Professional ratings
Review scores
| Source | Rating |
|---|---|
| Allmusic | 2.5/5 stars |
| Country Weekly | C− |

Tate Stevens is the major-label debut studio album by American country singer Tate Stevens. It was released on April 23, 2013 via RCA Nashville and Syco Music, and is his first album after winning the second season of The X Factor. "Power of a Love Song" was released as the album's lead single on March 12, 2013. Another track, "Holler If You're with Me," was given a music video and used to promote Pepsi.

== Commercial performance ==
The album sold over 17,000 units, debuting at number 18 on the Billboard 200, and at number 4 on the US Top Country Albums. As of July 11, 2013, the album has sold 38,000 copies in the US.

== Track listing ==
| No. | Title | Writer(s) | Length |
|---|---|---|---|
| 1. | "I Got This" | Joe Diffie, Wade Kirby, Phil O'Donnell, Tate Stevens | 2:51 |
| 2. | "Can't Get Nothin' Done" | Ashley Gorley, Kirby, O'Donnell, Stevens | 3:05 |
| 3. | "Ride It Out" | Shane Minor, David Lee Murphy, Stevens | 3:08 |
| 4. | "Power of a Love Song" | Jeremy Bussey, Bradley Gaskin, Marcus Franklin Johnson | 3:13 |
| 5. | "Sweet" | Kelly Garrett, Kendell Marvel, Tim Owens | 2:49 |
| 6. | "That's Where We Live" | Carson Chamberlain, Kirby, O'Donnell | 3:29 |
| 7. | "El Camino" | Chris Hennessee, Donny Lowery | 3:05 |
| 8. | "That's How You Get the Girl" | Dallas Davidson, Ben Hayslip, Rivers Rutherford | 3:12 |
| 9. | "Ordinary Angels" | Victoria Banks, Phil Barton, Emily Shackleton | 3:32 |
| 10. | "The Last Thing I Do" | Murphy, Kim Tribble | 3:27 |
| 11. | "Holler If You're with Me" | Bussey, Drew Davis | 2:48 |
| Total length: | | | 34:39 |

== Personnel ==
- Jeremy Asbrock- choir
- Pat Buchanan- electric guitar
- Ryan Cook- choir
- J.T. Corenflos- electric guitar
- Glen Duncan- banjo, fiddle, acoustic guitar
- Wes Hightower- background vocals
- Mark Hill- bass guitar
- Steve Hinson- dobro, steel guitar, slide guitar
- John Hobbs- keyboards
- Devin Malone- cello, electric guitar, percussion
- Greg Morrow- drums, percussion
- Philip Shouse- choir
- Tate Stevens- choir, lead vocals
- Paul Taylor- choir
- Russell Terrell- background vocals
- Ilya Toshinsky- banjo, acoustic guitar
- Jason Waters- percussion
- John Willis- acoustic guitar
- Deano Workman- choir

== Chart performance ==
=== Album ===
| Chart (2013) | Peak position |
|---|---|
| New Zealand Albums (RMNZ) | 38 |
| UK Country Albums (Official Charts) | 17 |
| US Billboard 200 | 18 |
| US Billboard Top Country Albums | 4 |

=== Singles ===
| Year | Single | Peak positions |
| Year | Single | US Country Airplay |
|---|---|---|
| 2013 | "Power of a Love Song" | 49 |
