= Tate Stevens =

American singer

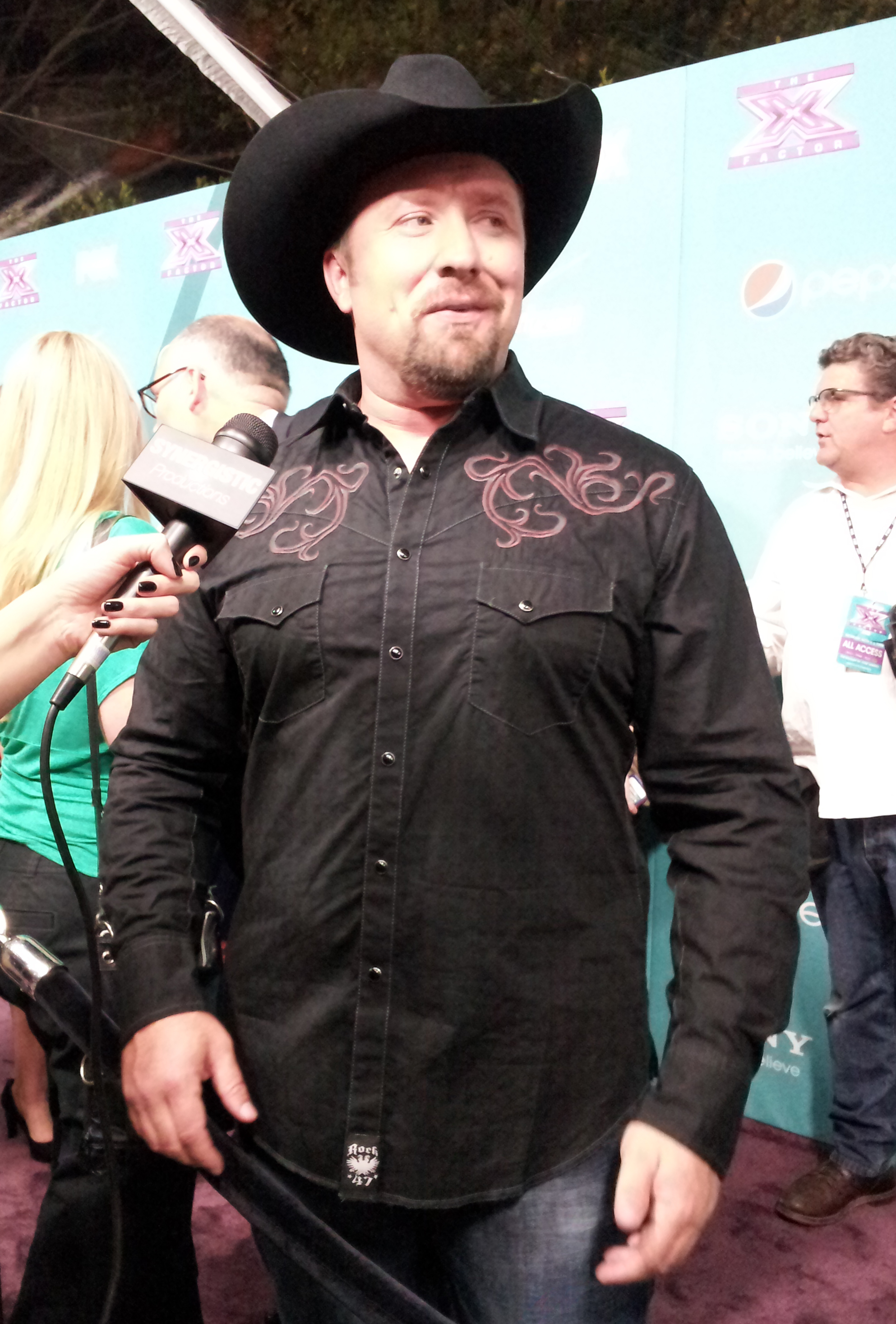
- Stevens in 2012

Background information
- Born: Stephen Eatinger; March 1, 1975 (age 51); Belton, Missouri, U.S.
- Genres: Country
- Occupation: Singer
- Instruments: Vocals, guitar, drums
- Years active: 1994–present
- Labels: Syco Music (2012-present); RCA Nashville (2013); RPM Entertainment
- Website: http://www.tatestevensofficial.com/

Stephen "Tater" Eatinger (born March 1, 1975), known by his stage name Tate Stevens, is an American country music artist, who won the second season of the U.S. The X Factor in 2012, securing a $5 million recording contract with Syco Music and RCA Records Nashville.

After touring with a band for several years immediately after high school, Stevens returned to Missouri to settle down and raise his young family, working in the city of Belton. He joined a local band in 2005 and formed his own band in 2008, releasing an independent album and touring on weekends and holidays. In early 2012, he auditioned for The X Factor, progressing through the various stages of the competition, until winning on December 20, 2012. He released his debut album in 2013.

== Early life ==
Stevens moved from Texas to Belton, Missouri as a child and grew up there, graduating from Belton High School in 1994. His father Steve had played the drums with a country band in Texas. He also was a construction worker.

== Music career ==
=== 1994–2000: Career beginnings and Dixie Cadillacs ===
Stevens adopted his stage name when he was a young singer in the 1990s. He released a single in 1994 entitled "It Sure Looks Good On You". Immediately after graduating high school, he began to tour as lead singer for a country band of five called the Dixie Cadillacs. The band released an album in June 1996 under Calf Creek Records under their band name. After touring for several years, Stevens returned to Missouri to settle down and raise his young family, working for the city of Belton, Missouri taking a construction job and later a job in the city's water department and later its street department repairing roads.

=== 2005–2008: Outlaw Junkies and Tate Stevens Band ===
Around 2005, he became the lead singer of the band Outlaw Junkies with Steve Koken and Robert Harmon. He left that band in 2008 to form the Tate Stevens Band, a six-man ensemble that has toured extensively in the Midwest on weekends and vacations. He also wrote songs and released an independent album in 2008.

=== 2012: The X Factor ===
In 2012, Stevens auditioned in Kansas City, Missouri for season 2 of The X Factor singing Randy Houser's "Anything Goes" in front of judges L.A. Reid, Demi Lovato, Britney Spears and temporary judge Louis Walsh, who was sitting in for Simon Cowell. He was selected to go to boot camp where he had to sing for survival singing "Nobody Knows" against Willie Jones. He was selected to be part of the judges' houses stage competing in the top 24 in the "Over 25s" category and was mentored by L.A. Reid. He sang "Back At One" at Reid's home in front of him and guest judges Justin Bieber and Scooter Braun. Reid ultimately chose Stevens as a part of his top four.

On the first live show he sang "Tough", a Craig Morgan song and was saved by his mentor L.A. Reid. On week 2 of the live shows, he performed Bon Jovi's song "Wanted Dead or Alive" and was declared the top of the popular vote in the competition. On Week 3 live show he performed "From This Moment" by Shania Twain again placing as top vote getter for a second week in a row. On week 4 live show he performed "I'm Already There" finishing second in popular vote to Carly Rose Sonenclar; he would remain in second place during the fifth week of live shows as well. During week 6 live show Stevens went "unplugged" with "Livin' on a Prayer" by Bon Jovi (for his acoustic song) and "If Tomorrow Never Comes" by Garth Brooks (chosen by the fans as his Pepsi Challenge song). His performance landed him back at the number one spot again. On the show's final week, Stevens performed "Tomorrow" by Chris Young and was crowned the winner of The X Factor. "Tomorrow" became the official winner's single.

==== Performances on The X Factor ====
Stevens performed the following songs on The X Factor:

| Show | Theme | Song | Original artist | Order | Result |
|---|---|---|---|---|---|
| Audition | Free choice | "Anything Goes" | Randy Houser | —N/a | Through to bootcamp |
| Bootcamp 1 | Solo performance | Not aired | | —N/a | Through to bootcamp 2 |
| Bootcamp 2 | Group performance | Not aired | | —N/a | Through to bootcamp 3 |
| Bootcamp 3 | Duet performance | "Nobody Knows" (with Willie Jones) | Tony Rich | —N/a | Through to judges' houses |
| Judges' houses | Free choice | "Back at One" | Brian McKnight | —N/a | Through to live shows |
| Week 1 | Made in America | "Tough" | Craig Morgan | 10 | Saved by L.A. Reid |
| Week 2 | Songs from movies | "Wanted Dead or Alive" | Bon Jovi | 7 | Safe (1st) |
| Week 3 | Divas | "From This Moment On" | Shania Twain | 2 | Safe (1st) |
| Week 4 | Giving Thanks | "I'm Already There" | Lonestar | 1 | Safe (2nd) |
| Week 5 | Number-ones | "Somebody Like You" | Keith Urban | 6 | Safe (2nd) |
| Week 6 | Unplugged songs | "Living on a Prayer" | Bon Jovi | 6 | Safe (1st) |
| Week 6 | Pepsi Challenge songs | "If Tomorrow Never Comes" | Garth Brooks | 12 | Safe (1st) |
| Semi-final | Contestant's choice | "Bonfire" | Craig Morgan | 1 | Safe (3rd) |
| Semi-final | No theme | "Fall" | Clay Walker | 5 | Safe (3rd) |
| Final | Favorite performance | "Anything Goes" | Randy Houser | 2 | Winner (1st) |
| Final | Celebrity duets | "Pontoon" (with Little Big Town) | Little Big Town | 5 | Winner (1st) |
| Final | Winner's song | "Tomorrow" | Chris Young | 8 | Winner (1st) |
| Final | Christmas songs | "Please Come Home for Christmas" | Charles Brown | 1 | Winner (1st) |

=== 2013–present: Tate Stevens ===
Stevens was scheduled to move to Nashville, Tennessee in early 2013 to begin working on his debut album, with work on the album reported to begin as soon as January 2, 2013. Stevens has stated that he would like to make a predominantly "fun" record, and hoped to co-write some of the songs. He stated he would like to work with Luke Laird and Kim Tribble. Stevens was signed to RCA Records Nashville on January 15, 2013. He released his debut song "Holler If You're With Me" in a commercial produced by Pepsi, which aired during the 2013 Grammy Awards on February 10, 2013. The full-length music video for the song became available online immediately afterwards. The music video for the song used about 100 extras, and focuses on a "big bonfire party." The music video was filmed in Simi Valley, California. "Power of a Love Song," which was released physically and digitally on March 12, 2013, with "Holler If You're With Me" as a B-side, served as the album's official lead single to country radio. Tate's self-titled debut album was released on April 23, 2013. The album debuted at number 18 on the Billboard 200 with 17,000 copies in its first week, and received good reviews from critics.

After "Power of a Love Song" reached a peak of number 49 on the Billboard Country Airplay chart, no further singles were released from the album. Subsequently, in August 2013, after winning a record deal with Sony (RCA Nashville), Stevens parted ways with the label.

== Personal life ==
Stevens grew up in Belton, Missouri part of greater Kansas City and now lives with his wife Ashlie, whom he met in high school and married in 1997, and their son Hayden and daughter Rylie in Peculiar, Missouri.

== Discography ==
=== Albums ===
| Title | Album details | Peak chart positions | | |
| Title | Album details | US Country | US | NZ |
|---|---|---|---|---|
| Tate Stevens | Release date: April 23, 2013; Label: Syco, RCA Nashville; Formats: CD, music download | 4 | 18 | 38 |

=== Extended plays ===
| Title | EP details |
|---|---|
| Sweet Life | Release date: May 17, 2016; Label: Nizzers Music, INC; Formats: music download |

=== Singles ===
| Year | Single | Peak positions | Album |
| Year | Single | US Country Airplay | Album |
|---|---|---|---|
| 2013 | "Power of a Love Song" | 49 | Tate Stevens |
| 2014 | "Better at Night" | — | Sweet Life |

=== Other charted songs ===
| Year | Single | Peak positions | Album |
| Year | Single | US Country | Album |
|---|---|---|---|
| 2013 | "Holler If You're with Me" | 50 | Tate Stevens |

=== Music videos ===
| Year | Video | Director |
|---|---|---|
| 2013 | "Holler If You're with Me" | |
| 2013 | "Power of a Love Song" | Mason Dixon |
| 2016 | "Sweet Life" | |

| Preceded by Melanie Amaro | Winner of The X Factor; 2012 | Succeeded by Alex & Sierra |
