= Carly Rose Sonenclar =

American singer and actress

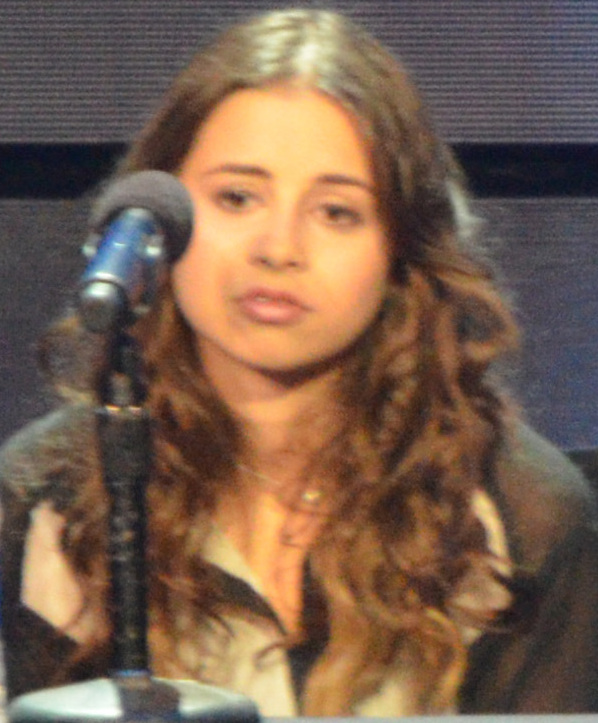
- Sonenclar at a press conference promoting the second season of The X Factor in 2012.

Background information
- Also known as: Carly Rose
- Born: April 20, 1999 (age 27); Westchester, New York, U.S.
- Genres: Indie pop; alternative rock; R&B; soul
- Occupations: Singer; songwriter; actress
- Instruments: Vocals; piano
- Years active: 2006–present
- Website: http://www.carlyrosemusic.com/

Carly Rose Sonenclar (born April 20, 1999), who performs under the name Carly Rose, is an American singer, songwriter and actress. In December 2012, she became the runner-up on the second season of The X Factor USA.

== Early and personal life ==
Sonenclar was born in Westchester, New York, and resides in Los Angeles, California. She began singing at the age of two, reenacting several of the performers on the early years of American Idol. She took numerous singing, dancing, piano and acting classes, and one of her teachers put her in touch with a New York City talent agency, which signed her. She has an older brother, Russell, who graduated from the University of Delaware in 2015.

Sonenclar graduated from Rye Neck High School in 2017. In the spring of 2021, she graduated from the University of Southern California with a Bachelor of Science in music.

Sonenclar is Jewish.

== Acting career ==
Sonenclar began her professional career in 2006 in a stage adaptation of The Night of the Hunter, at the New York Musical Theatre Festival, in which she played the lead role of Pearl. In that same year, she made her Broadway debut in Les Miserables as Young Cosette. In 2009, she appeared in the national tour of Little House on the Prairie, the Musical, starring Melissa Gilbert, originating the principal role of Carrie. Sonenclar made her television debut as Gilda Flip on PBS, the newest Prankster in season three of The Electric Company, produced by Sesame Workshop.

In 2011, Sonenclar originated the role of Chloe (Alice's daughter) in the short-lived musical Wonderland on Broadway and the earlier Tampa workshop. In this role, she garnered good reviews, including one by The New York Times theater critic Charles Isherwood, who described Sonenclar as a good actress and an "almost preternaturally skilled singer" and she drew comparisons with Sutton Foster. She is a featured soloist on the cast CD produced by Sony Masterworks and was named the 2011 Best Young Performer by broadwayworld.com. Sonenclar originated the lead role of Parsley in The Big Bank, a musical debuted at the New York Musical Theater Festival in October 2011.

Sonenclar has appeared in two feature movies, The Nanny Diaries playing as the "child of nanny" and a small role in The Sisterhood of the Traveling Pants 2. She has made numerous TV guest appearances.

== Singing career ==
=== 2012: The X Factor ===
In 2012, Sonenclar auditioned for the second season of The X Factor USA with the song "Feeling Good" by Anthony Newley and Leslie Bricusse (famously covered by Nina Simone among others). Sonenclar received a standing ovation from all four judges (L.A. Reid commented "You may be 13, but your soul is old!"; Simon Cowell awarded her "4,833 yeses"), and she advanced to the next round. After her successful initial audition, she advanced through the first day of the "Bootcamp," stage of The X Factor where she sang "Pumped Up Kicks" with Beatrice Miller. Of the 120 contestants who auditioned at bootcamp that day, she was among the sixty acts asked to continue on. At the end of bootcamp, she was chosen to be one of the six contestants in the "Teens" category who were invited to perform at the "Judges' Houses" stage of the competition. She performed the song "Brokenhearted" for the "Teens" category mentor, Britney Spears, and Spears' guest judge will.i.am. Both Spears and will.i.am responded positively to her performance; will.i.am remarked appreciatively that she was "possessed." Sonenclar next advanced into the live shows, where she performed "Good Feeling" in the first week, then in the second week, where she performed "It Will Rain". When Sonenclar reached the third week, she performed "My Heart Will Go On", where she finished second in the public vote, behind only Tate Stevens, a distinction she achieved again after advancing to the fourth week.

On November 21, she performed the song "Over the Rainbow", which she received a standing ovation from all four judges, sending her into the fifth week. In addition, she also won the public vote overtaking Stevens. On November 28, she performed "Rolling in the Deep", sending her into the quarter-final, and was revealed to have again won the public vote. She advanced to the final, in which she performed "Feeling Good" (again), "How Do I Live" (with LeAnn Rimes), and "Hallelujah". On December 20, 2012, she finished the competition in second place behind Tate Stevens.

==== Performances on The X Factor ====
Sonenclar performed the following songs on The X Factor:

Show	Theme	Song	Original artist	Order	Result
Audition	Free choice	"Feeling Good"	Nina Simone	—N/a	Advanced
Bootcamp 1	Solo performance	"Runaway Baby"	Bruno Mars	—N/a	Advanced
Bootcamp 2	Group performance	Not aired		—N/a	Advanced
Bootcamp 3	Duet performance	"Pumped Up Kicks" (with Beatrice Miller)	Foster the People	—N/a	Advanced
Judges' houses	Free choice	"Brokenhearted"	Karmin	—N/a	Advanced
Week 1	Made in America	"Something's Got a Hold on Me" / "Good Feeling"	Etta James / Flo Rida	15	Advanced
Week 2	Songs from movies	"It Will Rain"	Bruno Mars	11	2nd
Week 3	Divas	"My Heart Will Go On"	Celine Dion	9	2nd
Week 4	Giving Thanks	"Over the Rainbow"	Judy Garland	10	1st
Week 5	Number-ones	"Rolling in the Deep"	Adele	5	1st
Quarter-Final	Unplugged songs	"As Long as You Love Me"	Justin Bieber featuring Big Sean	3	2nd
Quarter-Final	Pepsi Challenge songs	"If I Were a Boy"	Beyoncé	9	2nd
Semi-Final	Contestant's choice	"Your Song"	Elton John	2	Safe (1st)
Semi-Final	No theme	"Imagine"	John Lennon	6	Safe (1st)
Final	Favorite performance	"Feeling Good"	Cy Grant	1	Runner-up
Final	Celebrity duets	"How Do I Live" (with LeAnn Rimes)	LeAnn Rimes	4	Runner-up
Final	Winner's song	"Hallelujah"	Leonard Cohen	7	Runner-up
Final	Christmas songs	"All I Want for Christmas Is You"	Mariah Carey	3	Runner-up

=== 2013–present: Unreleased music and independent releases ===
Sonenclar stated in 2013 that Syco Music had a recording option on her, and that they were "trying to find the right record label" for her. Despite her opting to attend and graduate middle school, high school, and college in the coming years, in June 2013, she performed her debut original song "Unforgettable", as well as another song called "Fighters". The following month, she performed at the opening ceremony of the 19th Maccabiah Games at Teddy Stadium in Jerusalem. In August 2013, she performed in New York City at the Best Buy Theater in Times Square as part of the Stand Up for a Cure 2013 Concert Series.

Sonenclar appeared in an episode of Law & Order: Special Victims Unit, "Dissonant Voices", which aired in November 2013, during the show's fifteenth season. Sonenclar has performed on several occasions with Boyce Avenue. In 2014, she continued to attend public high school and released an original music video, "Everybody's Watching". She gave a concert at Provident Bank Park in Pomona, New York, in July 2014, where she performed three original songs, “Aliens”, “Weekend” and “Everybody’s Watching”. On May 29, 2014, Sonenclar was ranked fifth by Fox Weekly on their list of Most Influential X Factor USA Contestants for her audition performance of "Feeling Good".

On June 19, 2019, Sonenclar released her debut single, "Birds & Bees". Since then, she has released numerous singles and a seven-song EP, "Wild". She collaborated with singer Goody Grace for her first music video, "Wild". In 2022, she rerecorded her cover of Karmin's "Brokenhearted", which she had performed ten years earlier at the Judges' Houses at The X Factor.

== Discography ==
=== Extended plays ===
Title	Details
Wild	Released: September 10, 2020; Label: Independent; Format: Digital download
Real	Released: August 1, 2025; Label: Independent; Format: Digital download

=== Singles ===
List of singles
Title	Year
"Birds & Bees"	2019
"Getaway Car"	2019
"Warned You"	2019
"3 Nights"	2020
"Twentyone"	2020
"Song of the Summer"	2020
"Wild" (with Goody Grace)	2020
"Change My Mind"	2020
"First"	2021
"Highest Love"	2022
"Suburbia"	2022
"Afterglow"	2022
"Brokenhearted"	2022
"Sugar Highs"	2022
"I'll Save a Place"	2022
"The Night When You Told Me Your Name"	2024
"Somebody's Someone"	2024
"Because of You"	2025
"Real"	2025

=== Other appearances ===
List of other album appearances
Title	Year	Other artist(s)	Album
"Home"	2011	None	Wonderland
"Heroes"	2011	Edward Staudenmayer, Jose Llana, E. Clayton Cornelious, Janet Dacal, Wonderland Ensemble	Wonderland
"Together"	2011	Darren Ritchie, E. Clayton Cornelious, Jose Llana, Edward Staudenmayer, Janet Dacal	Wonderland
"Counting Stars/The Monster"	2015	Boyce Avenue	Covers Collaborations, Vol. 3
"Say Something"	2015	Boyce Avenue	Covers Collaborations, Vol. 3
"Runaway"	2015	Timeflies	Just For Fun
"Take Me Slow"	2016	None	Honey 3: Dare to Dance
