= The X Factor (American TV series) season 2 =

The X Factor
- Season 2
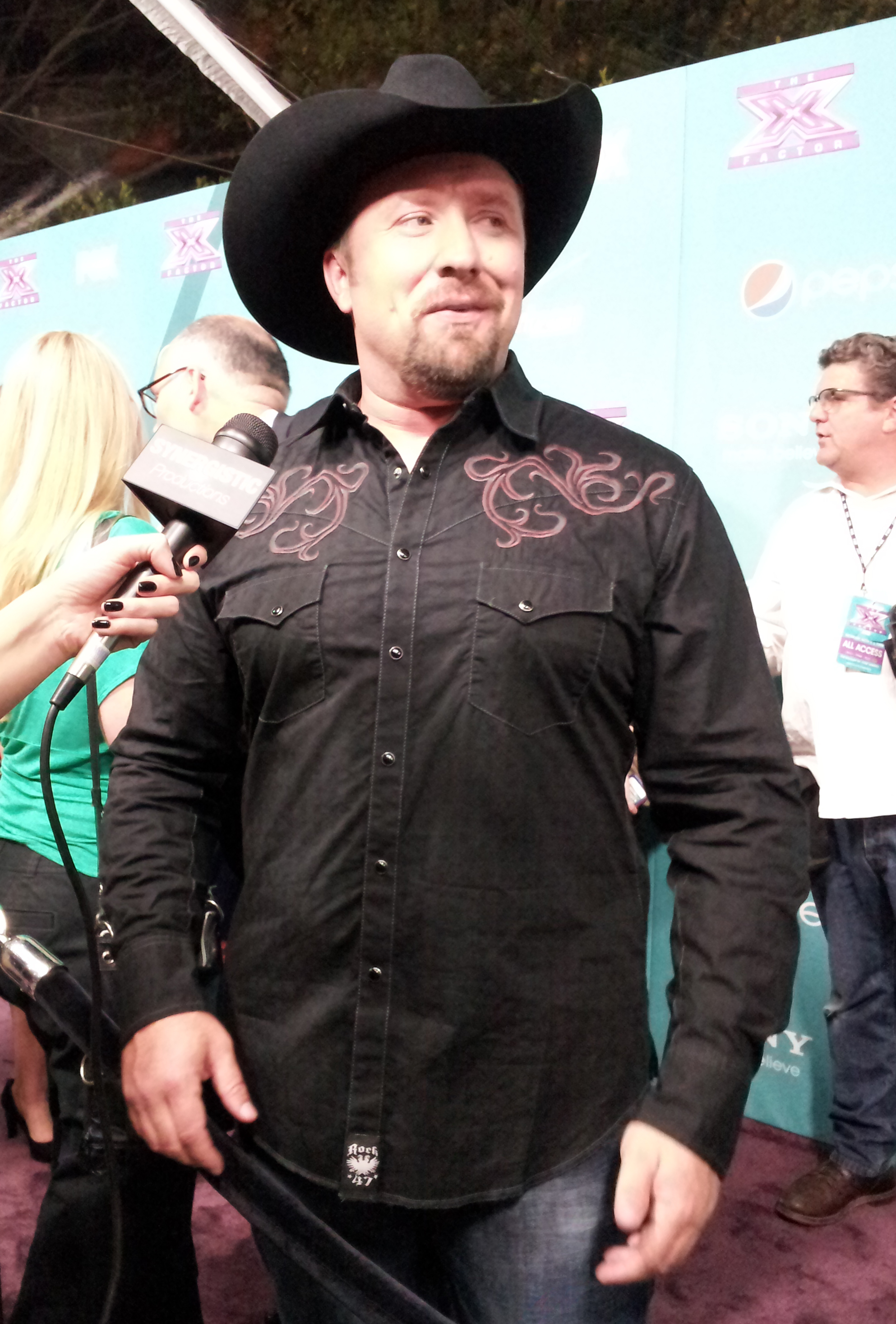
- Hosted by: Khloé Kardashian (Live Shows); Mario Lopez (Live Shows)
- Judges: Demi Lovato; Simon Cowell; Britney Spears; L.A. Reid; Louis Walsh (Kansas City auditions)
- Winner: Tate Stevens
- Winning mentor: L.A. Reid
- Runner-up: Carly Rose Sonenclar

Release
- Original network: Fox
- Original release: September 12 – December 20, 2012

Season chronology
- ← Previous; Season 1 Next → Season 3

Season two of the American television music competition show The X Factor premiered on Fox on September 12, 2012, and ended on December 20, 2012.

Based on the British format, the competition consists of auditions, in front of producers and then the judges with a live audience; bootcamp; judges' houses and then the live finals. Auditions for the show began in May 2012 and concluded in July 2012. The show is hosted by reality star Khloé Kardashian and Extra host Mario Lopez, replacing Steve Jones from the previous year. Simon Cowell and L.A. Reid returned as judges, while Paula Abdul and Nicole Scherzinger were replaced by Demi Lovato and Britney Spears.

== Judges and hosts ==
Judges and Host(s) for The X Factor Season 2

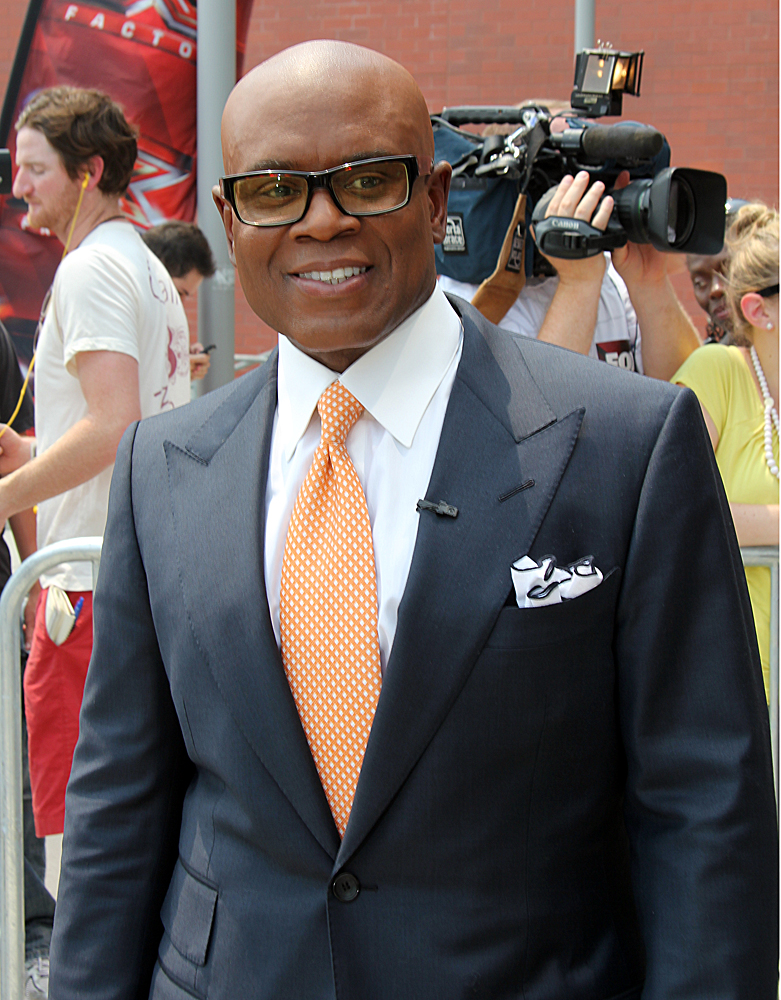
L.A. Reid

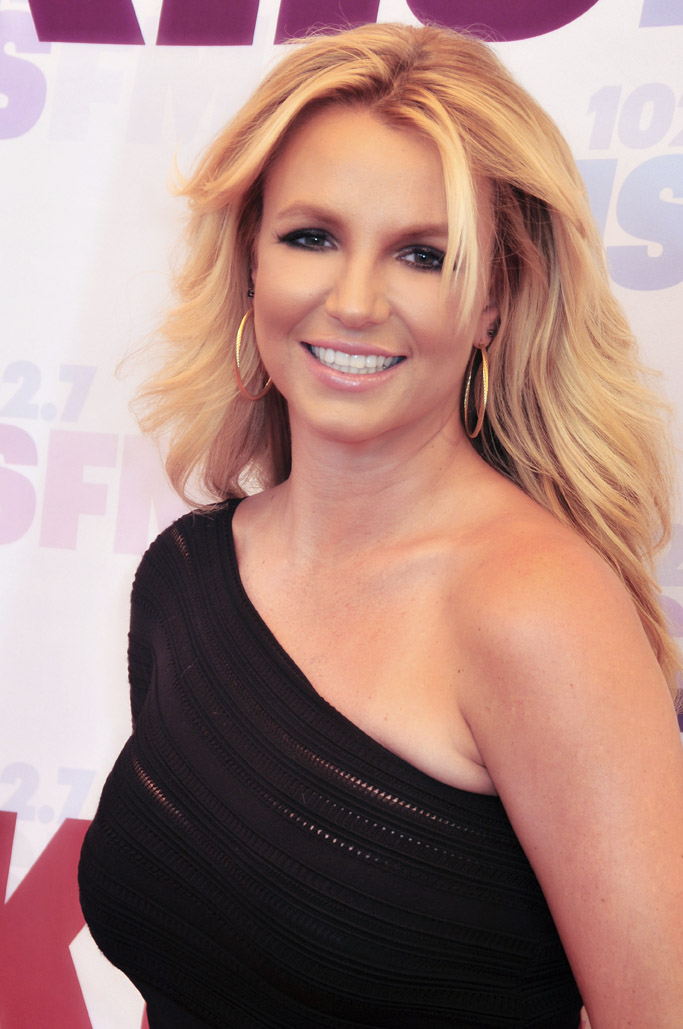
Britney Spears

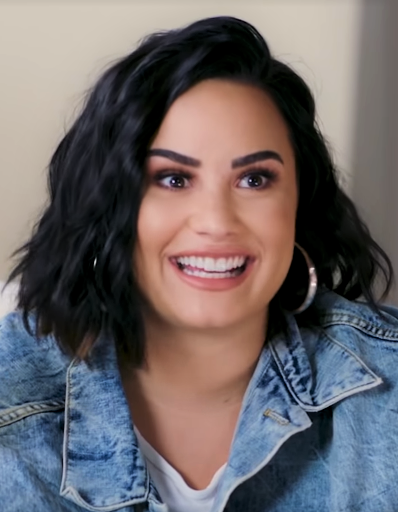
Demi Lovato

Simon Cowell

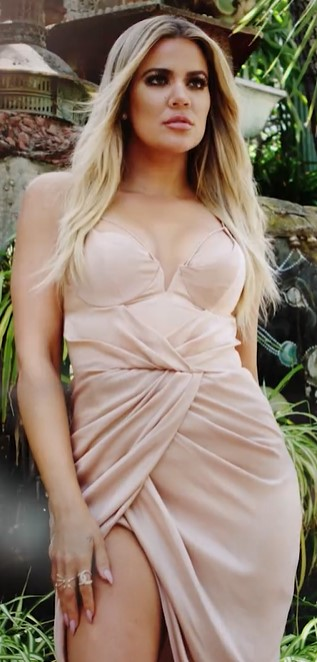
Khloé Kardashian (Live Shows Only)

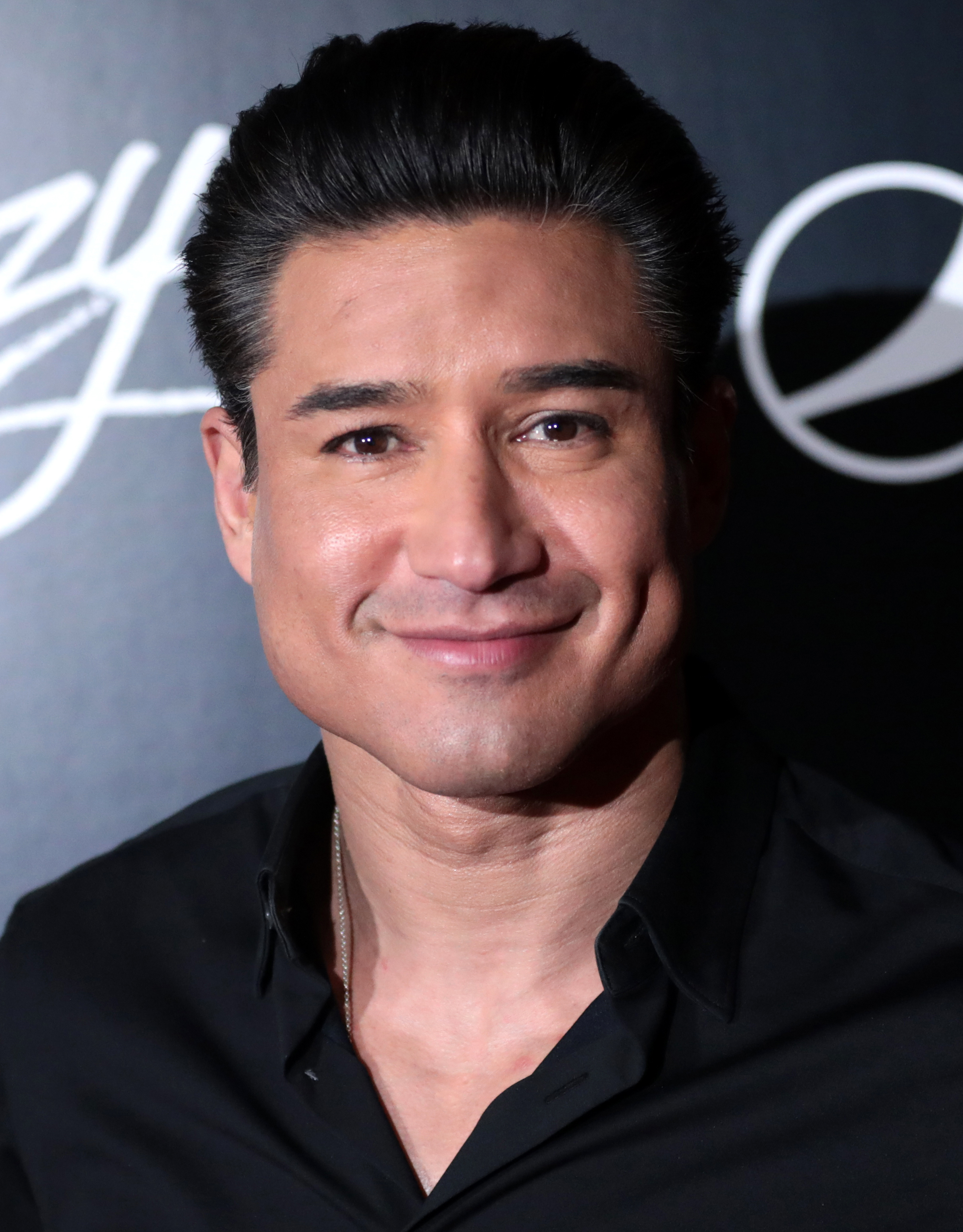
Mario Lopez (Live Shows Only)

On January 9, 2012, Fox announced that The X Factor would undergo some changes for its second season. On January 30, it was confirmed that host Steve Jones and judges Nicole Scherzinger and Paula Abdul would not be returning for the second season. Following Scherzinger's departure, she transferred to the UK show to replace Kelly Rowland as a judge for the 2012 UK series. On February 6, Simon Cowell and L.A. Reid were the only confirmed judges for season 2. Prior to her death, Whitney Houston was approached as a potential replacement judge. It was also reported that Cowell was in talks with Britney Spears for her to join the show, reportedly offering her $15 million. On May 9, reports surfaced that Spears officially signed on to judge the show. It was also rumored that Demi Lovato and Miley Cyrus were in talks to be the second replacement judge. Lovato reportedly signed the deal on May 13, making her the youngest ever X Factor judge. The following day, it was officially confirmed that Spears and Lovato would join The X Factor as the two newest judges. When asked about the new judges, Cowell said:

I'm absolutely delighted Britney and Demi are joining us. Britney remains one of the biggest stars in the world, she's talented, fascinating – and I believe she knows exactly how to spot the X factor. Demi's had an amazing career in music, TV and film for someone her age. She's young, confident, and enthusiastic. I think it's really important that she speaks to our younger audience. The new panel will be dynamic and will work really well with the changes we are making to the show."

Season 2 hosts

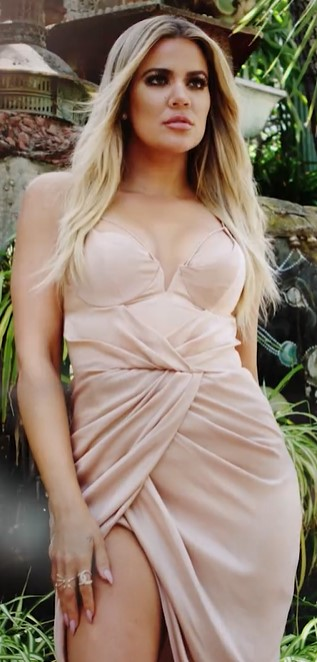
Khloé Kardashian

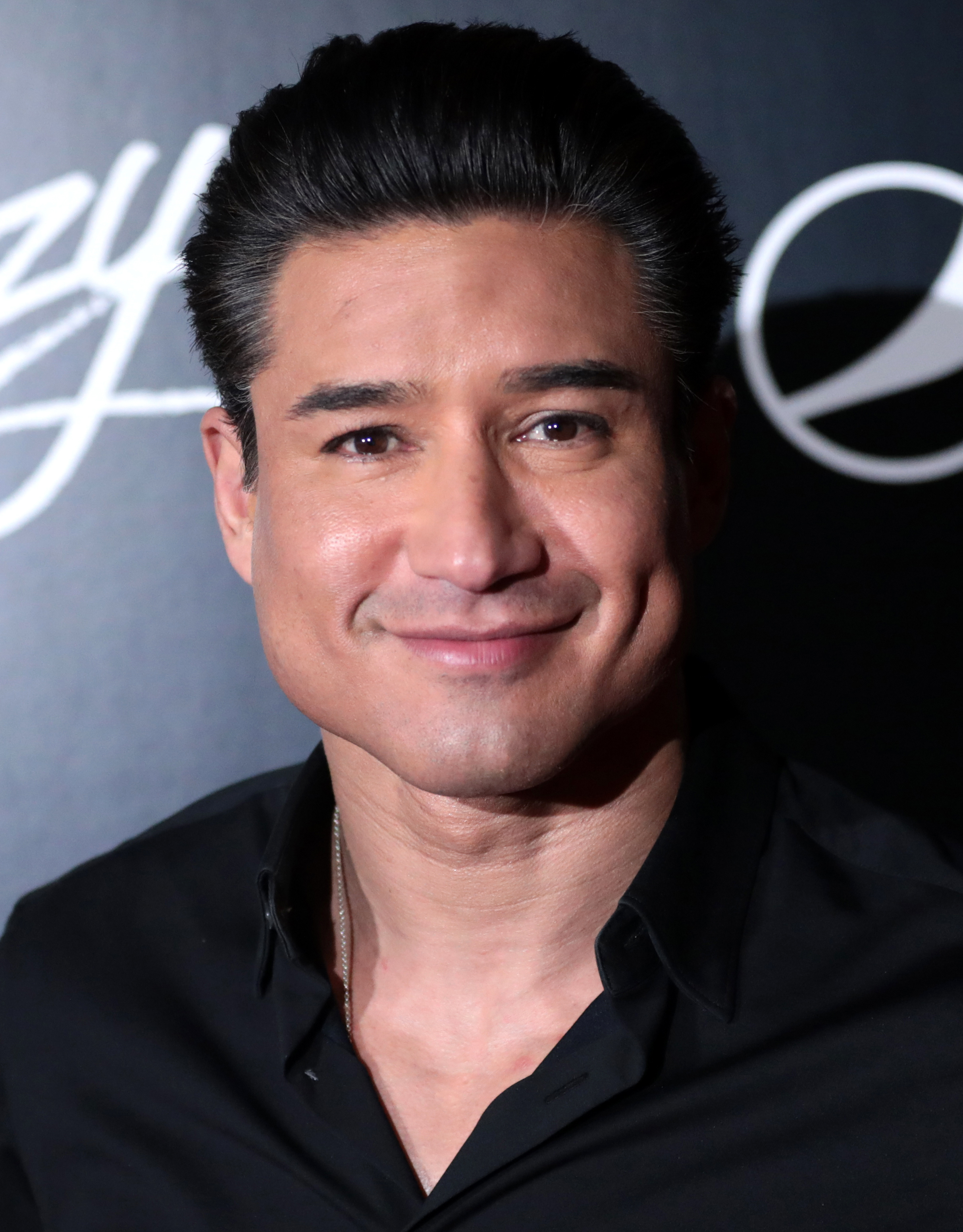
Mario Lopez

On June 26, 2012, Cowell confirmed that in his search for a new host he had narrowed the possibilities to five candidates. On June 29, Cowell revealed that there would be one male and one female host, and neither of them had hosted before. People considered for hosting slots included Stacy Keibler, Mario Lopez, Khloé Kardashian, Kelly Osbourne, Terrence J, Erin Andrews, and Mike Catherwood. It was also reported that Glee star Kevin McHale was in talks for the male hosting position. According to then-recent reports, Kardashian, McHale, and Nick Jonas were the front runners to host the show. On October 15, 2012, it was officially confirmed by E! News that Kardashian had officially signed on as co-host for the show, with Lopez close to signing a deal and was later confirmed as co-host the next day.

Irish music manager and The X Factor UK judge Louis Walsh filled in for Cowell at the Kansas City auditions while Cowell was recovering from bronchitis. On August 27, it was reported that Nick Jonas had signed a deal to help Lovato at judges' houses. It was later reported that Justin Bieber would be helping Reid, Marc Anthony helping Cowell, and will.i.am helping Spears.

This was the final season to feature L.A. Reid as a judge, after he announced that he was quitting the show in order to concentrate on other projects.

== Selection process ==
=== Auditions ===
Cities where the auditions were held.

The producers' auditions began on March 14, 2012, at the Sprint Center in Kansas City, Missouri. More producers' auditions were held on March 22 at the Frank Erwin Center in Austin, Texas, April 20 at the Cow Palace in San Francisco, California, May 1 at the Greensboro Coliseum in Greensboro, North Carolina and concluded on May 10 at the Dunkin' Donuts Center in Providence, Rhode Island.

The judges' auditions took place between May and July. The auditions went without a host as they had yet to hire new hosts by the time auditions started.

Summary of judges' auditions
City	Date	Venue	Date aired	Judges			
Austin, Texas	May 24–25, 2012	Frank Erwin Center	September 12 & 19, 2012	Reid	Spears	Lovato	Cowell
Kansas City, Missouri	June 8–9, 2012	Sprint Center	September 19, 2012	Reid	Spears	Lovato	Walsh
San Francisco, California	June 16–18, 2012	Cow Palace	September 12–13, 19, & 26-27 2012	Reid	Spears	Lovato	Cowell
Providence, Rhode Island	June 27–29, 2012	Dunkin' Donuts Center	September 12–13 & 26, 2012	Reid	Spears	Lovato	Cowell
Greensboro, North Carolina	July 8–10, 2012	Greensboro Coliseum	September 20, & 26-27 2012	Reid	Spears	Lovato	Cowell

=== Bootcamp ===
Filming for bootcamp was held on July 25–27, 2012 in Miami. As with the auditions, there were no hosts at bootcamp.

120 contestants made it to the Bootcamp stage. At bootcamp the contestants had to perform two tasks. Task 1 involved the contestants had to sing solo, after which the judges eliminated half of the acts, bringing the total down to 60. In Task 2 the contestants were paired up to perform together. After Task 2 the judges narrowed down the acts to the 24 who progress on to the Judges's homes round.

The groups Fifth Harmony, Playback, and LYRIC 145 were formed from eliminated contestants from the Teens, Young Adults and Groups categories in bootcamp. Fifth Harmony was known as LYLAS at this stage; their name was changed after they made the top 16 when a group consisting of four of Bruno Mars' sisters, called "The Lylas", claimed the show stole their name. Their name changed again for the Top 13 performances, as their mentor Simon Cowell was not in favor of the name 1432 and felt that the show's viewers could make a better name for the group.

=== Judges' houses ===
The judges' houses was filmed September 28 & 29, 2012. The judges received news of their categories from the producers by telephone, seen during the third bootcamp episode on October 10. Reid mentored the over 25s in Beverly Hills, California, assisted by Justin Bieber, accompanied by his manager Scooter Braun; Cowell took the groups to Miami Beach, Florida with Latin singer Marc Anthony, Spears had the teens in Malibu, California with The Black Eyed Peas member and The Voice UK coach will.i.am, and Lovato had the young adults in Los Angeles, with Jonas Brothers member Nick Jonas.

Summary of judges' houses
Judge	Category	Location	Assistant(s)	Acts Eliminated
Cowell	Groups	Miami Beach, Florida	Marc Anthony	Dope Crisis; Playback
Lovato	Young Adults	Los Angeles, California	Nick Jonas	Jillian Jensen; Nick Youngerman
Reid	Over 25s	Beverly Hills, California	Justin Bieber; Scooter Braun	Daryl Black; Tara Simon
Spears	Teens	Malibu, California	will.i.am	Reed Deming; James Tanner

== Acts ==
The top sixteen acts were confirmed as follows;

Key:

– Winner
– Runner-Up

Act	Age(s)	Hometown	Category (mentor)	Result
Tate Stevens	37	Belton, Missouri	Over 25s (Reid)	Winner
Carly Rose Sonenclar	13	Mamaroneck, New York	Teens (Spears)	Runner-Up
Fifth Harmony	15-19	Various	Groups (Cowell)	3rd Place
Emblem3	16-20	Sequim, Washington	Groups (Cowell)	4th Place
Diamond White	13	Los Angeles, California	Teens (Spears)	5th Place
CeCe Frey	21	Decatur, Illinois	Young Adults (Lovato)	6th Place
Vino Alan	40	Waynesville, Missouri	Over 25s (Reid)	7th Place
Paige Thomas	22	San Antonio, Texas	Young Adults (Lovato)	8th Place
Beatrice Miller	13	Maplewood, New Jersey	Teens (Spears)	9th Place
Arin Ray	17	Cincinnati, Ohio	Teens (Spears)	10th Place
Jennel Garcia	18	Rochester, Massachusetts	Young Adults (Lovato)	11th Place
LYRIC 145	19-24	Queens, New York/Flint, Michigan	Groups (Cowell)	12th Place
Jason Brock	35	San Francisco, California	Over 25s (Reid)	13th Place
Sister C	18-21	Harris County, Texas	Groups (Cowell)	14th Place
David Correy	27	Riva, Maryland	Over 25s (Reid)	15th Place
Willie Jones	18	Shreveport, Louisiana	Young Adults (Lovato)	16th Place

== Live shows ==
The live shows began on October 31, 2012. This was the debut episode for Lopez and Kardashian as hosts on the show. Each week, the contestants performed on Wednesday, with the voting lines opening after the performances. As with previous season, each live show has a different theme. The live final took place on December 19 and 20. A recording of "Live and Let Die" by The X Factor UK series five winner Alexandra Burke featured on the second week of live shows.

Each results show featured musical performances from at least two artists. There was no guest performer on the first result show. The second results show featured two performances from The X Factor UK series seven contestants One Direction, while Taylor Swift performed on the third result show.The X Factor UK series seven Contestsnt Cher Lloyd and Becky G performed on the fourth results show. Week five included the premiering of a music video by will.i.am featuring judge Spears and performances from season one runner-up Josh Krajcik and Alicia Keys. Season one winner Melanie Amaro and Kesha performed on the sixth week. The semi-final results show featured performances from Bruno Mars and Bridgit Mendler. One Direction performed again in the final, and Pitbull also performed. This was the only season to feature the leaderboard which reveals which act has the most votes.

=== Results summary ===
Color key

–	Act was chosen as the bottom two by their mentor and had to sing again in the sing-off (no public vote)
–	Act was in the bottom two/three and had to sing again in the final showdown
–	Act was in the bottom three but received the fewest votes and was immediately eliminated
–	Act received the fewest public votes and was immediately eliminated (no final showdown)
–	Act received the most public votes

Weekly results per act
Act	Week 1^{1}		Week 2	Week 3	Week 4	Week 5	Quarter-Final	Semi-Final	Final	
Act	Mentor Vote		Week 2	Week 3	Week 4	Week 5	Quarter-Final	Semi-Final	First Vote	Second Vote
Tate Stevens	Saved		1st	1st	2nd	2nd	1st	3rd	2nd	1st
Carly Rose Sonenclar	Saved		2nd	2nd	1st	1st	2nd	1st	1st	2nd
Fifth Harmony	Saved		5th	6th	7th	4th	4th	2nd	3rd	Eliminated (final)
Emblem3	Saved		6th	4th	4th	3rd	3rd	4th	Eliminated (semi-final)	
Diamond White	Eliminated		4th	7th	5th	6th	5th	Eliminated (quarter-final)		
CeCe Frey	Saved		12th	5th	9th	5th	6th	Eliminated (quarter-final)		
Vino Alan	Saved		3rd	3rd	3rd	7th	Eliminated (week 5)			
Paige Thomas	Saved		8th	11th	6th	8th	Eliminated (week 5)			
Beatrice Miller	Saved		10th	8th	8th	Eliminated (week 4)				
Arin Ray	Saved		11th	9th	10th	Eliminated (week 4)				
Jennel Garcia	Saved		7th	10th	Eliminated (week 3)					
LYRIC 145	Saved		9th	12th	Eliminated (week 3)					
Jason Brock	Saved		13th	Eliminated (week 2)						
Sister C	Eliminated		Eliminated (week 1)							
David Correy	Eliminated		Eliminated (week 1)							
Willie Jones	Eliminated		Eliminated (week 1)							
Final Showdown	Frey, Jones		Brock, Frey	Garcia, Thomas	Frey, Miller	Alan, White	Fifth Harmony, White	No final showdown or judges' votes; results were based on public votes alone		
Final Showdown	Brock, Correy		Brock, Frey	Garcia, Thomas	Frey, Miller	Alan, White	Fifth Harmony, White	No final showdown or judges' votes; results were based on public votes alone		
Final Showdown	Ray, White		Brock, Frey	Garcia, Thomas	Frey, Miller	Alan, White	Fifth Harmony, White	No final showdown or judges' votes; results were based on public votes alone		
Final Showdown	Fifth Harmony, Sister C		Brock, Frey	Garcia, Thomas	Frey, Miller	Alan, White	Fifth Harmony, White	No final showdown or judges' votes; results were based on public votes alone		
Judges voted to	Send Through	Eliminate						No final showdown or judges' votes; results were based on public votes alone		
Reid's vote (Over 25s)	Alan, Stevens	Correy	Frey	Garcia	Miller	White	White	No final showdown or judges' votes; results were based on public votes alone		
Spears' vote (Teens)	Miller, Sonenclar	White	Frey	Garcia	Frey	Alan	Fifth Harmony	No final showdown or judges' votes; results were based on public votes alone		
Lovato's vote (Young Adults)	Garcia, Thomas	Jones	Brock	Thomas	Miller	Alan	White	No final showdown or judges' votes; results were based on public votes alone		
Cowell's vote (Groups)	Emblem3, LYRIC 145	Sister C	Brock	Garcia	Miller	Alan	White	No final showdown or judges' votes; results were based on public votes alone		
Eliminated	Willie Jones by Lovato		Jason Brock; 2 of 4 votes Deadlock	LYRIC 145; Public vote to save	Arin Ray; Public vote to save	Paige Thomas; Public vote to save	CeCe Frey; Public vote to save	Emblem3; Public vote to save	Fifth Harmony; Public vote to win	Carly Rose Sonenclar; Public vote to win
Eliminated	David Correy by Reid		Jason Brock; 2 of 4 votes Deadlock	LYRIC 145; Public vote to save	Arin Ray; Public vote to save	Paige Thomas; Public vote to save	CeCe Frey; Public vote to save	Emblem3; Public vote to save	Fifth Harmony; Public vote to win	Carly Rose Sonenclar; Public vote to win
Eliminated	Diamond White^{2} by Spears		Jason Brock; 2 of 4 votes Deadlock	Jennel Garcia; 3 of 4 votes Majority	Beatrice Miller; 3 of 4 votes Majority	Vino Alan; 3 of 4 votes Majority	Diamond White; 3 of 4 votes Majority	Emblem3; Public vote to save	Fifth Harmony; Public vote to win	Carly Rose Sonenclar; Public vote to win
Eliminated	Sister C by Cowell		Jason Brock; 2 of 4 votes Deadlock	Jennel Garcia; 3 of 4 votes Majority	Beatrice Miller; 3 of 4 votes Majority	Vino Alan; 3 of 4 votes Majority	Diamond White; 3 of 4 votes Majority	Emblem3; Public vote to save	Fifth Harmony; Public vote to win	Carly Rose Sonenclar; Public vote to win
Reference(s)										

- ^1 There was no public vote in the first week. Each mentor selected two acts from their own category to advance to the second week and the two remaining acts as the bottom two. The bottom two acts performed another song of their choice in the sing-off and their mentor was required to eliminate one of the bottom two acts they selected.
- ^2 White returned to the competition in week two because the judges felt that she should not have been eliminated in week one.

=== Live show details ===
==== Week 1 (October 31/November 1) ====
- Theme: Songs by American artists (billed as "Made in America")

Acts' performances on the first live show
Act	Category (mentor)	Order	Song	American Artist	Result
Paige Thomas	Young Adults (Lovato)	1	"What Is Love"	Haddaway	Safe
Arin Ray	Teens (Spears)	2	"You Keep Me Hangin' On"	The Supremes	Bottom Two
David Correy	Over 25s (Reid)	3	"My Love Is Your Love"	Whitney Houston	Bottom Two
Sister C	Groups (Cowell)	4	"Hell on Heels"	Pistol Annies	Bottom Two
Jennel Garcia	Young Adults (Lovato)	5	"Home Sweet Home"	Mötley Crüe	Safe
Diamond White	Teens (Spears)	6	"Hey, Soul Sister"	Train	Bottom Two
Vino Alan	Over 25s (Reid)	7	"Gotta Be Somebody"	Nickelback	Safe
LYRIC 145	Groups (Cowell)	8	"Boom! Shake the Room"/"Gangnam Style"	DJ Jazzy Jeff & The Fresh Prince/Psy	Safe
CeCe Frey	Young Adults (Lovato)	9	"Because the Night"	10,000 Maniacs	Bottom Two
Tate Stevens	Over 25s (Reid)	10	"Tough"	Craig Morgan	Safe
Beatrice Miller	Teens (Spears)	11	"I Won't Give Up"	Jason Mraz	Safe
Jason Brock	Over 25s (Reid)	12	"Dance Again"	Jennifer Lopez	Bottom Two
Fifth Harmony	Groups (Cowell)	13	"We Are Never Ever Getting Back Together"	Taylor Swift	Bottom Two
Willie Jones	Young Adults (Lovato)	14	"Here for the Party"	Gretchen Wilson	Bottom Two
Carly Rose Sonenclar	Teens (Spears)	15	"Something's Got a Hold on Me"/"Good Feeling"	Etta James/Flo Rida	Safe
Emblem3	Groups (Cowell)	16	"One Day"	Matisyahu	Safe
Sing-off details
CeCe Frey	Young Adults (Lovato)	1	"Out Here on My Own"		Safe
Willie Jones	Young Adults (Lovato)	2	"You Don't Know Me"		Eliminated
David Correy	Over 25s (Reid)	3	"Since U Been Gone"		Eliminated
Jason Brock	Over 25s (Reid)	4	"One Moment in Time"		Safe
Arin Ray	Teens (Spears)	5	"I Look to You"		Safe
Diamond White	Teens (Spears)	6	"Sorry Seems to Be the Hardest Word"		Eliminated
Sister C	Groups (Cowell)	7	"When I Look at You"		Eliminated
Fifth Harmony	Groups (Cowell)	8	"Skyscraper"		Safe

- There was no public vote in the first week. Each mentor selected two finalists from their own category as the bottom two. The bottom two acts performed another song of their choice in a sing-off and their mentor was required to eliminate one of them based on the performance.

Judges' decisions to eliminate

- Lovato: Willie Jones – gave no reason
- Reid: David Correy – gave no reason
- Spears: Diamond White – gave no reason
- Cowell: Sister C – gave no reason

==== Week 2 (November 7/8) ====
- Theme: Songs from movies
- Musical guest: One Direction ("Live While We're Young" and "Little Things")

One of the four acts that did not face the public vote in week one and was eliminated by mentor was reinstated to the show as the judges felt that the act should not have been eliminated in the previous week. The reinstated act was announced as Diamond White at the start of the season's second live show. 1432 being known as Fifth Harmony started in week two.

Acts' performances on the second live show
Act	Category (mentor)	Order	Song	Movie	Result
Arin Ray	Teens (Spears)	1	"American Boy"	Obsessed	Safe
Paige Thomas	Young Adults (Lovato)	2	"Take My Breath Away"	Top Gun	Safe
Vino Alan	Over 25s (Reid)	3	"When a Man Loves a Woman"	When a Man Loves a Woman	Safe
Emblem3	Groups (Cowell)	4	"My Girl"/"California Gurls"/"What Makes You Beautiful"	My Girl/Katy Perry: Part of Me	Safe
Beatrice Miller	Teens (Spears)	5	"Iris"	City of Angels	Safe
Jennel Garcia	Young Adults (Lovato)	6	"I Love Rock 'n' Roll"	Crossroads	Safe
Tate Stevens	Over 25s (Reid)	7	"Wanted Dead or Alive"	Harley Davidson and the Marlboro Man	Safe (Highest Votes)
LYRIC 145	Groups (Cowell)	8	"Supercalifragilisticexpialidocious"	Mary Poppins	Safe
Diamond White	Teens (Spears)	9	"I Have Nothing"	The Bodyguard	Safe
CeCe Frey	Young Adults (Lovato)	10	"Eye of the Tiger"	Rocky III	Bottom Two
Carly Rose Sonenclar	Teens (Spears)	11	"It Will Rain"	The Twilight Saga: Breaking Dawn – Part 1	Safe
Jason Brock	Over 25s (Reid)	12	"I Believe I Can Fly"	Space Jam	Bottom Two
Fifth Harmony	Groups (Cowell)	13	"A Thousand Years"	The Twilight Saga: Breaking Dawn – Part 2	Safe
Final showdown details
CeCe Frey	Young Adults (Lovato)	1	"You Haven't Seen the Last of Me"		Safe
Jason Brock	Over 25s (Reid)	2	"Total Eclipse of the Heart"		Eliminated

Judges' votes to eliminate

- Lovato: Jason Brock – backed her own act, CeCe Frey.
- Reid: Cece Frey – backed his own act, Jason Brock.
- Spears: CeCe Frey – gave no reason.
- Cowell: Jason Brock – gave no reason.

With the acts in the bottom two receiving two votes each, the result went to deadlock and reverted to the earlier public vote. Brock was eliminated as the act with the fewest public votes.

==== Week 3 (November 14/15) ====
- Theme: Divas
- Musical guest: Taylor Swift ("State of Grace")

Starting from week three, two acts were eliminated from each results show until the quarter-final. The three acts with the fewest public votes were announced and then the act with the fewest votes was automatically eliminated. The remaining two acts then performed in the final showdown and face the judges' votes.

Acts' performances on the third live show
Act	Category (mentor)	Order	Song	Diva	Result
Jennel Garcia	Young Adults (Lovato)	1	"Proud Mary"	Tina Turner	Bottom Three
Tate Stevens	Over 25s (Reid)	2	"From This Moment On"	Shania Twain	Safe (Highest Votes)
Diamond White	Teens (Spears)	3	"Halo"	Beyoncé	Safe
Beatrice Miller	Teens (Spears)	4	"Time After Time"	Cyndi Lauper	Safe
LYRIC 145	Groups (Cowell)	5	"We Will Rock You"/"E.T."	Katy Perry	Eliminated
Arin Ray	Teens (Spears)	6	"Crazy for You"	Madonna	Safe
Paige Thomas	Young Adults (Lovato)	7	"Last Dance"	Donna Summer	Bottom Three
Fifth Harmony	Groups (Cowell)	8	"Hero"	Mariah Carey	Safe
Carly Rose Sonenclar	Teens (Spears)	9	"My Heart Will Go On"	Celine Dion	Safe
Vino Alan	Over 25s (Reid)	10	"Let's Stay Together"	Tina Turner	Safe
Emblem3	Groups (Cowell)	11	"No One"	Alicia Keys	Safe
CeCe Frey	Young Adults (Lovato)	12	"All by Myself"	Celine Dion	Safe
Final showdown details
Jennel Garcia	Young Adults (Lovato)	1	"The Reason"		Eliminated
Paige Thomas	Young Adults (Lovato)	2	"Paradise"		Safe

Judges' votes to eliminate

- Reid: Jennel Garcia – gave no reason.
- Spears: Jennel Garcia – gave no reason.
- Lovato: Paige Thomas – gave no reason but after the show in an interview, she felt that Garcia "was more talented" despite Thomas having "more star quality".
- Cowell: Jennel Garcia – stated he had an "easy decision" and felt that Thomas had "got the best star potential" after watching her final showdown performance.

After Reid and Spears voted against Garcia, Lopez asked Cowell for his vote. Cowell stated he wanted Lovato to vote before him. Lopez attempted to persuade Cowell to vote before Lovato, but Cowell insisted on Lovato voting before him. As a result, Lopez asked Lovato to vote before Cowell. The second before Lovato appeared to give her response, she pushed Cowell to vote before her as he was asked first but Lopez told Lovato the show was pressed for time and Cowell objected. Lovato voted against Thomas and then Cowell voted against Garcia. In an interview after the show, Cowell said he already intended to vote against Garcia and persisted to have Lovato vote before him because he knew if he voted before Lovato then she would not have to vote, was curious as to who Lovato wanted to save and thought the audience wanted to know who Lovato was going to vote against.

However, voting statistics revealed that Garcia received more votes than Thomas which meant that if the result went to deadlock, Garcia would have been saved.

==== Week 4 (November 21/22) ====
- Theme: Thanksgiving
- Group performance: "Fix You" (with Bancroft Middle School choir)
- Musical guests: Cher Lloyd featuring Becky G ("Oath")

Acts' performances on the fourth live show
Act	Category (mentor)	Order	Song	Result
Tate Stevens	Over 25s (Reid)	1	"I'm Already There"	Safe
Diamond White	Teens (Spears)	2	"Because You Loved Me"	Safe
Emblem3	Groups (Cowell)	3	"Secrets"	Safe
Arin Ray	Teens (Spears)	4	"Hero"	Eliminated
CeCe Frey	Young Adults (Lovato)	5	"Wind Beneath My Wings"	Bottom Three
Fifth Harmony	Groups (Cowell)	6	"I'll Stand by You"	Safe
Beatrice Miller	Teens (Spears)	7	"Chasing Cars"	Bottom Three
Vino Alan	Over 25s (Reid)	8	"God Bless the USA"	Safe
Paige Thomas	Young Adults (Lovato)	9	"Everytime"	Safe
Carly Rose Sonenclar	Teens (Spears)	10	"Over the Rainbow"	Safe (Highest Votes)
Final showdown details
CeCe Frey	Young Adults (Lovato)	1	"Because of You"	Safe
Beatrice Miller	Teens (Spears)	2	"White Flag"	Eliminated

Judges' votes to eliminate

- Lovato: Beatrice Miller – backed her own act, CeCe Frey.
- Spears: CeCe Frey – backed her own act, Beatrice Miller.
- Reid: Beatrice Miller – gave no reason.
- Cowell: Beatrice Miller – thought the competition was "all getting too much for" Miller and that the then-present time was not "the right time for" her.

However, voting statistics revealed that Miller received more votes than Frey which meant that if Cowell sent the result to deadlock, Miller would have been saved.

==== Week 5 (November 28/29) ====
- Theme: Number-ones
- Musical guests: Josh Krajcik ("One Thing She’ll Never Know") and Alicia Keys ("Girl on Fire")
- Music video premiere: will.i.am featuring Britney Spears ("Scream & Shout")

Acts' performances on the fifth live show
Act	Category (mentor)	Order	Song	Result
Diamond White	Teens (Spears)	1	"I Wanna Dance with Somebody (Who Loves Me)"	Bottom Three
Vino Alan	Over 25s (Reid)	2	"You've Lost That Lovin' Feelin'"	Bottom Three
Paige Thomas	Young Adults (Lovato)	3	"Never Gonna Give You Up"	Eliminated
Fifth Harmony	Groups (Cowell)	4	"Stronger (What Doesn't Kill You)"	Safe
Carly Rose Sonenclar	Teens (Spears)	5	"Rolling in the Deep"	Safe (Highest Votes)
Tate Stevens	Over 25s (Reid)	6	"Somebody Like You"	Safe
CeCe Frey	Young Adults (Lovato)	7	"Lady Marmalade"	Safe
Emblem3	Groups (Cowell)	8	"I'm a Believer"	Safe
Final showdown details
Diamond White	Teens (Spears)	1	"I Was Here"	Safe
Vino Alan	Over 25s (Reid)	2	"Trouble"	Eliminated

Judges' votes to eliminate

- Reid: Diamond White – backed his own act, Vino Alan.
- Spears: Vino Alan – backed her own act, Diamond White.
- Lovato: Vino Alan – gave no reason.
- Cowell: Vino Alan – gave no reason.

==== Week 6: Quarter-Final (December 5/6) ====
- Themes: Unplugged songs; Pepsi Challenge songs
- Musical guests: Melanie Amaro ("Long Distance") and Kesha ("C'Mon")

For the first time this season, each act performed two songs. The list of song choices for the Pepsi Challenge was released via Twitter on December 1, 2012.

List of song choices for Pepsi Challenge
Act	Category (mentor)	Song choices	Result
Carly Rose Sonenclar	Teens (Spears)	"If I Were a Boy"	Chosen
Carly Rose Sonenclar	Teens (Spears)	"I Just Can't Stop Loving You"	Not Chosen
Carly Rose Sonenclar	Teens (Spears)	"Your Song"	Not Chosen
CeCe Frey	Young Adults (Lovato)	"Die Young"	Not Chosen
CeCe Frey	Young Adults (Lovato)	"Part of Me"	Chosen
CeCe Frey	Young Adults (Lovato)	"So What"	Not Chosen
Diamond White	Teens (Spears)	"Diamonds"	Chosen
Diamond White	Teens (Spears)	"Kiss from a Rose"	Not Chosen
Diamond White	Teens (Spears)	"Mercy"	Not Chosen
Emblem3	Groups (Cowell)	"I Gotta Feeling"	Not Chosen
Emblem3	Groups (Cowell)	"Forever Young"	Chosen
Emblem3	Groups (Cowell)	"Marry You"	Not Chosen
Fifth Harmony	Groups (Cowell)	"What Makes You Beautiful"	Not Chosen
Fifth Harmony	Groups (Cowell)	"Anything Could Happen"	Not Chosen
Fifth Harmony	Groups (Cowell)	"Give Your Heart a Break"	Chosen
Tate Stevens	Over 25s (Reid)	"The Dance"	Not Chosen
Tate Stevens	Over 25s (Reid)	"She's Country"	Not Chosen
Tate Stevens	Over 25s (Reid)	"If Tomorrow Never Comes"	Chosen

Acts' performances in the quarter-final
Act	Category (mentor)	Order	Unplugged song	Order	Pepsi Challenge song	Result
CeCe Frey	Young Adults (Lovato)	1	"The Edge of Glory"	7	"Part of Me"	Eliminated
Emblem3	Groups (Cowell)	2	"Just the Way You Are"	8	"Forever Young"	Safe
Carly Rose Sonenclar	Teens (Spears)	3	"As Long as You Love Me"	9	"If I Were a Boy"	Safe
Fifth Harmony	Groups (Cowell)	4	"Set Fire to the Rain"	10	"Give Your Heart a Break"	Bottom Three
Diamond White	Teens (Spears)	5	"It's a Man's Man's Man's World"	11	"Diamonds"	Bottom Three
Tate Stevens	Over 25s (Reid)	6	"Livin' on a Prayer"	12	"If Tomorrow Never Comes"	Safe (Highest Votes)
Final showdown details
Fifth Harmony	Groups (Cowell)	1	"Anytime You Need a Friend"			Safe
Diamond White	Teens (Spears)	2	"I Hope You Dance"			Eliminated

Judges' votes to eliminate

- Cowell: Diamond White – backed his own act, Fifth Harmony.
- Spears: Fifth Harmony – backed her own act, Diamond White.
- Reid: Diamond White – gave no reason.
- Lovato: Diamond White – gave no reason.

==== Week 7: Semi-Final (December 12/13) ====
- Themes: Contestant's choice; "songs to get you to the final" (no theme)
- Group performance: "Coming Home" / "Coming Home, Pt. II"
- Musical guests: Bridgit Mendler ("Ready or Not") and Bruno Mars ("Locked Out of Heaven")

Acts' performances in the semi-final
Act	Category (mentor)	Order	First song	Order	Second song	Result
Tate Stevens	Over 25s (Reid)	1	"Bonfire"	5	"Fall"	Safe
Carly Rose Sonenclar	Teens (Spears)	2	"Your Song"	6	"Imagine"	Safe (Highest Votes)
Emblem3	Groups (Cowell)	3	"Baby, I Love Your Way"	7	"Hey Jude"	Eliminated
Fifth Harmony	Groups (Cowell)	4	"Anything Could Happen"	8	"Impossible"	Safe

The semi-final did not feature a final showdown nor a leaderboard. Instead the act with the fewest public votes, Emblem3, were automatically eliminated.

==== Week 8: Final (December 19/20) ====
The final consisted of two two-hour episodes on December 19 and 20.

December 19

- Themes: Favorite performance (billed as "song of the season"); celebrity duets; winner's song (billed as "$5 million song")
- Group performance: "You Are Not Alone" (all top 13 contestants; in dedication to the Sandy Hook Elementary School shooting victims)

Acts' performances on the Wednesday Final
Act	Category (mentor)	Order	First song	Order	Second song (Duet)	Order	Third song
Carly Rose Sonenclar	Teens (Spears)	1	"Feeling Good"	4	"How Do I Live" (with LeAnn Rimes)	7	"Hallelujah"
Tate Stevens	Over 25s (Reid)	2	"Anything Goes"	5	"Pontoon" (with Little Big Town)	8	"Tomorrow"
Fifth Harmony	Groups (Cowell)	3	"Anything Could Happen"	6	"Give Your Heart a Break" (with Demi Lovato)	9	"Let It Be"

December 20

- Theme: Christmas songs
- Group performances: "All You Need Is Love" and "The Climb" (performed by Carly Rose Sonenclar and Tate Stevens)
- Musical guests: Pitbull ("Don't Stop the Party" / "Feel This Moment") and One Direction ("Kiss You")

Acts' performances on the Thursday Final
Act	Category (mentor)	Order	Song	Result
Tate Stevens	Over 25s (Reid)	1	"Please Come Home for Christmas"	Winner
Fifth Harmony	Groups (Cowell)	2	"Christmas (Baby Please Come Home)"	Eliminated
Carly Rose Sonenclar	Teens (Spears)	3	"All I Want for Christmas Is You"	Runner-Up

== Contestants who Appeared on Other Seasons or Shows ==
- Arin Ray competed in Season 1 as a member of InTENsity, who were eliminated in 12th place.
- Jeff Gutt auditioned again in Season 3. He lost against Alex & Sierra in the finale.
- Fifth Harmony members Normani and Ally Brooke competed on the 24th and 28th seasons of Dancing with the Stars, respectively. Both finished in 3rd place in their respective seasons.
- Diamond White later found success as a voice actor, starring in shows such as Transformers: Rescue Bots and The Lion Guard.
- Jillian Jensen auditioned for 13th season of American Idol. She made it to the Top 30.

== Famous Relations ==
- Sophie Tweed-Simmons, who was cut during the Boot Camp round, is the daughter of Gene Simmons and Shannon Tweed.

== Reception ==
=== U.S. Nielsen ratings ===
Ep. #	Episode	Airdate	Rating	Share	Rating/share (18–49)	Viewers (millions)	Rank (timeslot)	Rank (night)
1	Auditions 1	September 12	5.2	8	3.4/10	8.73	#2	#3
2	Auditions 2	September 13	5.2	9	3.1/10	8.28	#2	#2
3	Auditions 3	September 19	5.5	9	3.6/11	9.54	#2	#2
4	Auditions 4	September 20	5.9	10	3.5/11	10.15	#1	#1
5	Auditions 5	September 26	5.7	9	3.4/10	9.63	#2	#5
6	Auditions 6	September 27	5.9	10	3.2/10	9.39	#2	#6
7	Bootcamp 1	October 3	5.5	9	3.5/11	9.71	#2	#2
8	Bootcamp 2	October 4	5.7	9	3.2/10	9.25	#2	#6
9	Bootcamp 3/Judges' houses 1	October 10	5.6	9	3.5/10	9.56	#2	#6
10	Judges' houses 2	October 11	5.0	8	2.9/8	8.43	#2	#3
11	Judges' houses 3 – Part 1	October 17 (Note: Due to a three-hour rain delay during Game 3 of the National League Championship Series, only the first hour of the third judges' houses episode aired. Due to the delay, ratings for the October 17 episode were lower than usual. The second hour aired as a separate episode in a special airing on October 23 on Fox in United States. In Canada on CTV, due to the delay caused by the Championship Series, CSI: Crime Scene Investigation, which was scheduled to air at 10:00pm, aired at 8:00pm EST. in place of The X Factor, while The X Factor aired in full from 9:00pm to 11:00pm EST.)	4.1	6	2.3/6	6.34	#3	#6
12	Judges' houses 3 – Part 2	October 23	3.7	6	2.3/6	5.71	#1	#7
13	Live show 1	October 31 (Note: Due to the 2012 World Series, The X Factor was preempted on October 18, 24 and 25. It returned on October 31. The first live show was originally scheduled to air on November 1, while the first results show was originally scheduled as a special airing on Sunday November 4.)	4.7	7	2.7/8	7.60	#2	#5
14	Live results 1	November 1			2.3/6	6.24	#3	#6
15	Live show 2	November 7			2.6/7	7.03	#4	#8
16	Live results 2	November 8			2.3/6	6.33	#3	#7
17	Live show 3	November 14	6.0	9	2.9/8	8.15	#3	#6
18	Live results 3	November 15			2.4/7	7.47	#2	#6
19	Live show 4	November 21		7	2.2/7	7.28	#3	#5
20	Live results 4	November 22		8	2.8/9	9.04	#1	#2
21	Live show 5	November 28			2.9/8	8.20	#1	#2
22	Live results 5	November 29			2.7/8	8.32	#2	#5
23	Live show 6	December 5			2.8/8	8.25	#1	#2
24	Live results 6	December 6			2.5/7	7.84	#2	#6
25	Live semi-final	December 12			2.7/8	7.79	#2	#4
26	Live semi-final results	December 13			2.4/7	7.66	#2	#6
27	Live final	December 19			2.7/8	8.35	#1	#1
28	Live final results	December 20			3.1/9	9.66	#1	#1

=== Controversy ===
==== Broadcast interruption of judges' houses ====
During the airing of the judges' houses episode on October 17, the show was stopped abruptly in the middle of Lovato's selection for the top 16 and cut immediately to a game of the National League Championship Series. This was due to the fact that the game was halted and rescheduled later in the day due to a rain delay, to be played concurrently with The X Factor. Between the two, Fox decided to air the game instead of the rest of the episode. Many viewers took to the internet and called Fox to complain about the interruption. Cowell even took to his Twitter to comment that: "It's what's known as a total f up." The show instead aired the following week in its entirety.

==== "Rejected" votes of Paige Thomas ====
During the fifth live show in November, many voters reported of having their votes "rejected" and their calls cut off when attempting to vote for Paige Thomas; Thomas was eliminated the following night. Fox and The X Factor affiliates have not confirmed or denied whether this had anything to do with Thomas' subsequent elimination the following night.

==== Don Philip audition ====
In the season two premiere, Don Philip, who once collaborated with Britney Spears on her debut album, auditioned in front of the judges, and received a "no" from all judges. He then told Access Hollywood that ten minutes of footage from the interview was edited out because he felt like the judges bullied him into revealing that he is gay. Spears reportedly replied "I think it’s fine you’re gay," though this was edited out as well. Fox then released a statement saying:

"The judges were not given any information at all about Mr. Philip prior to his audition. The personal information that Mr. Philip quickly volunteered at the start of his audition was a surprise to the judges, who asked what had happened during the past 10 years, as they were interested in Mr. Philip’s career. While we understand his decision to discuss his personal life, Mr. Philip’s sexual orientation was not something that any of the judges or producers felt was relevant to this audition. When advertising and promoting open auditions, thousands of people are informed about the ways to enter the show. Mr. Philip himself chose to enter for a chance to win a five million dollar recording contract."

Later that year, an insider revealed that he was contacted specifically by producers because of his association with Spears, and that according to him, "she already knew he was going to be there, of course, because this is a reality show".
