= The X Factor (American TV series) =

American reality television music competition show

- Genre: Reality television
- Created by: Simon Cowell (uncredited)
- Showrunner: Simon Cowell
- Creative directors: Brian Friedman; Jamie King
- Presented by: Mario Lopez; Khloé Kardashian; Steve Jones
- Judges: Simon Cowell; L.A. Reid; Paula Abdul; Nicole Scherzinger; Britney Spears; Demi Lovato; Kelly Rowland; Paulina Rubio
- Composer: Simon Cowell
- Country of origin: United States
- Original language: English
- No. of seasons: 3
- No. of episodes: 80

Production
- Executive producers: Simon Cowell (uncredited); Cecile Frot-Coutaz; Siobhan Greene; Richard Holloway; Andrew Llinares; Rob Wade
- Production locations: Various (auditions); CBS Television City (live shows)
- Running time: 60–150 minutes
- Production companies: FremantleMedia North America; Syco Entertainment

Original release
- Network: Fox
- Release: September 21, 2011 – December 19, 2013

Related
- The X Factor

The X Factor, also known as The X Factor USA, is an American reality television music competition show created by Simon Cowell and produced by FremantleMedia North America and SYCOtv, a partnership between Cowell and Sony Music Entertainment, which aired on Fox. Based on the original British show, and an addition to The X Factor franchise, the series found new singing talent (solo artists and groups ages 12 and over), drawn from public auditions, and they competed against each other for votes. The winners were determined by the show's viewers via telephone, the Internet, and SMS text voting, and were awarded a recording contract with Cowell's record label Syco Music, worth $5 million in seasons one and two, and $1 million in season three. America voted for the following winners: Melanie Amaro, Tate Stevens, and Alex & Sierra, respectively.

The show began airing on September 21, 2011, through negative reviews, and aired annually from September through December. The series employs a panel of judges who critique the contestants' performances. Each contestant is assigned to one of four categories. The group acts are one category and the others are based on age or gender. For example, in season 1 the categories were girls, boys, groups, and over 30s. Each judge was assigned to one of the categories, and acted as a mentor to the contestants in their category, helping with song choices, styling, and staging, while also judging contestants from the other categories after each of the live performances. They competed with each other to try to get one of the contestants in their category to win the competition, thus making them the winning judge.

The most successful act to emerge from the series is Fifth Harmony, with all members launching solo careers.

The original judging panel consisted of Cowell, Paula Abdul, Cheryl Cole, and L.A. Reid, with Nicole Scherzinger and Steve Jones as co-hosts. Scherzinger would later replace Cole on the judging panel after two audition sites. Demi Lovato and Britney Spears joined the panel in the second season as replacements for Abdul and Scherzinger, while Khloé Kardashian and Mario Lopez replaced Jones as co-hosts. Reid and Spears did not return for the third season and were replaced by Kelly Rowland and Paulina Rubio, while Lopez became sole host after Kardashian was not asked to come back.

== Announcement and launch ==
On January 11, 2010, News Corporation (via Fox News in the U.S. and The Times in the UK) reported that Cowell would leave American Idol after season 9 in order to bring The X Factor to the United States in September 2011. Cowell told the Television Critics Association that he was leaving American Idol so that he could judge and act as executive producer of the American version of The X Factor. Additionally, Cowell signed a long-term contract with Sony Music, who already supported Syco Music artists in the UK, under which he was involved with the production of the American version of the show and also worked with the artists who won recording contracts.

In November 2010, Fox began airing short commercials for the program, which displayed the text "Coming to America Fall 2011". The New York Times described the commercials as efforts by the network to set up the launch of The X Factor as a television "event." In February 2011, during Super Bowl XLV, Fox unveiled the official logo for the show in a promo starring Cowell. A second promo was shown during the course of that evening, featuring Katy Perry, Justin Bieber, Black Eyed Peas, Usher, Lady Gaga, The Pussycat Dolls, and Madonna. This promo gave rise to speculation about who would join Cowell on The X Factor judging panel.

== Format ==
=== Categories ===
The show is primarily concerned with identifying singing talent, though appearance, personality, stage presence and dance routines are also an important element of many performances. Each judge is assigned one of four categories, to use their experience to help the artists. For season one, these categories were: "Boys" (aged 12–29 males), "Girls" (aged 12–29 females), "Over 30s" (solo acts aged 30 and over), and "Groups" (including duos). Season two's categories and age group boundaries were changed, with the "Boys" and "Girls" categories becoming "Teens" (solo acts aged 12–17) and "Young Adults" (solo acts aged 18–24), and the "Over 30s" became "Over 25s" (solo acts aged 25 and over). For both seasons, some groups were formed from soloists and other groups rejected after the audition process. Through the live shows, the judges act as mentors to their category, helping to decide song choices, styling, and staging, while judging contestants from other categories.

Season three's categories and age group boundaries were changed, with the "Teens" and "Youth Adults" categories becoming back as "Boys" (aged 12–24 males) and "Girls" (aged 12–24 females) and the "Over 25s" (solo acts aged 25 and over).

=== Stages for seasons 1 and 2 ===
There are five stages to the competition:

- Stage 1: Producers' auditions (these auditions decide who will sing in front of the judges)
- Stage 2: Judges' auditions
- Stage 3: Boot camp
- Stage 4: Judges' houses
- Stage 5: Live shows (finals)

=== Stages for season 3 ===
There are four stages to the competition:

- Stage 1: Producers' audition (these auditions decide who will sing in front of the judges)
- Stage 2: Judges' auditions
- Stage 3: Four-chair challenge
- Stage 4: Live shows (finals)

=== Auditions ===
The show is open to solo artists and vocal groups aged 12 and above, with no upper age limit. Applicants are given an opportunity to apply by uploading a video audition to the Internet. The show's producers also send a "mobile audition van" to various locations throughout the U.S. to audition singers who are unable to attend the arena auditions. A round of first auditions is held in front of producers months before the show is aired, some by application and appointment, and others in "open" auditions that anyone can attend. These auditions, held at various venues around the U.S., attract very large crowds. The producers' auditions are not televised, but shots of crowds waving and "judges' cars" arriving are filmed and later spliced in with the televised auditions shot later in the year. After waiting at the venue for hours (during which crews film more shots of crowds screaming and waving), each candidate is given a brief audition by someone from the production team. If they pass that audition (either because of their talent or because the producers think they will make entertaining television), they are given a "golden ticket" that allows them to audition for a more senior member of the production team. Only candidates who successfully pass this second audition (and then a third along similar lines) are invited to perform in front of the judges. (The televised version misleadingly gives the impression that everyone in the huge crowds shown is waiting for a chance to perform for the judges.)

A selection of the auditions in front of the judges – usually the best, the worst and the most bizarre – are broadcast during the first few weeks of the show. The judges' auditions are held in front of a live audience, and the acts sing over a backing track. If a majority of the judges (in this case, at least three judges) have to say "yes" then the act goes through to the next stage, otherwise, they are sent home.

=== Boot camp and judges' houses ===
In the first two seasons, The contestants selected at the auditions were further refined through a series of performances at "boot camp", and then at the "judges' houses", until a small number eventually progressed to the live finals (seventeen in season 1, and sixteen in season 2).

At boot camp, the judges collaboratively chose a small number of acts (32 in season 1 with eight in each category; 24 in season 2 with six in each category) for the next round, "judges' houses". The producers then assigned each of the judges a category to mentor, and the judges split up for the "judges' houses" round, in which each of them hosted the contestants in their assigned category at a luxurious residence, often scattered around the globe. The houses the contestants visited did not in every case actually belong to the judges, some were rented for the occasion.

The contestants did not know who their mentor would be until they arrived at that judge's house.

During this round, each judge held another round of auditions on location, and then further reduced the number of acts with the help of a celebrity guest.

In season three, these stages of the competition are being replaced by a new stage called "The Six-Chair Challenge", first introduced in the Dutch version of the series.

=== Live shows ===
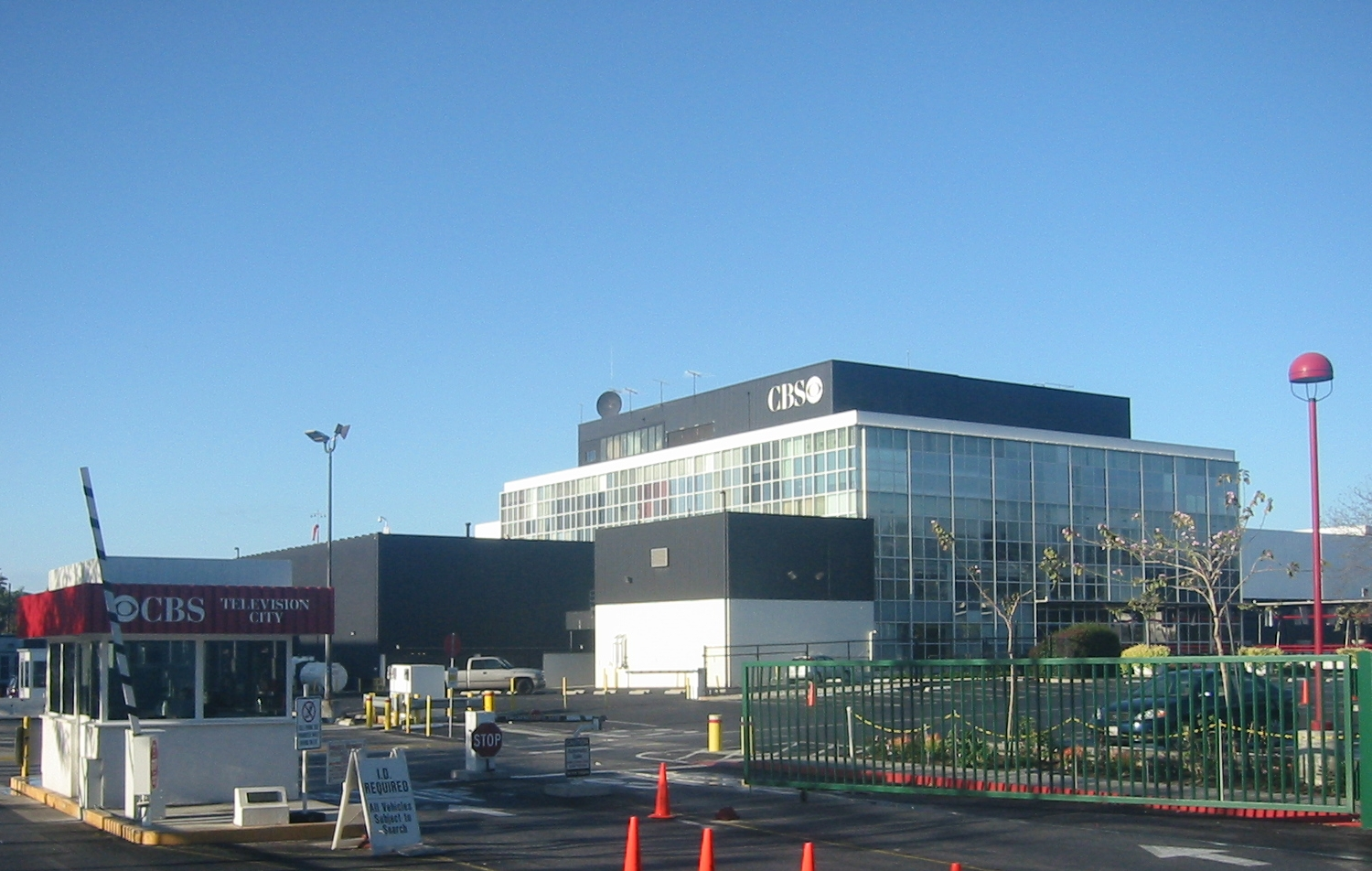
CBS Television City

The selected contestants (either 16 or 17 acts) move into shared accommodation in the Hollywood Hills to take part in the show. The same mansion is also notably used for housing the finalists from American Idol.

The finals consist of a series of two live shows, the first featuring the contestants' performances and the second revealing the results of the public voting, culminating in one or more acts being eliminated. Celebrity guest performers also feature regularly. These live shows are filmed at CBS Television City in Los Angeles, California. The performance shows were broadcast on Wednesday nights and the results show on Thursday nights. In season one, seventeen acts were put through to the live shows, and sixteen acts were put through in season two.

In addition to the live broadcast on Fox, Sony and SYCOtv created a completely integrated second-screen experience and a Pepsi sponsored live digital pre-show known as The X Factor Digital Experience. In addition to watching the program live on television, the audience was now able to participate on multiple platforms in real-time.

==== Performances ====
The show is primarily concerned with identifying a potential pop star or star group, and singing talent, appearance, personality, stage presence and dance routines are all important elements of the contestants' performances. In the initial live shows, each act performs once in the first show in front of a studio audience and the judges, usually singing over a pre-recorded backing track. Dancers are also commonly featured. Acts occasionally accompany themselves on guitar or piano. Each live show has had a different theme; each contestant's song is chosen according to the theme. After each act has performed, the judges comment on their performance. Heated disagreements, usually involving judges defending their contestants against criticism, are a regular feature of the show. Once all the acts have appeared, the phone lines open and the viewing public vote on which act they want to keep. Once the number of contestants has been reduced to five (season 1), or six (season 2), each act would perform twice in the performances show. This continues until only three acts remain. These acts go on to appear in the grand final which decides the overall winner by public vote.

==== Results ====
Before the results are announced, the results show occasionally begins with a group performance from the remaining contestants. However, the song is pre-recorded and the contestants mime, due to problems with the number of microphones. The two acts polling the fewest votes are revealed. Both these acts perform again in a "final showdown", and the judges vote on which of the two to send home. They were able to pick new songs to perform in the "final showdown". "Double elimination" took place in some of the results shows, where the bottom three acts were revealed and the act with the fewest votes was automatically eliminated, and the two with the next fewest votes performed in the "final showdown" as normal. In season two, at the end of each result show, the rankings of the acts based on the public votes were announced.

Ties are possible as there are four judges voting on which of the two to send home. In the event of a tie, the result goes to deadlock, and the act who finished last in the public vote is sent home. The actual number of votes cast for each act is not revealed, nor even the order until after the season's conclusion. However, a twist occurred in season two where the rankings of the acts based on the public vote for the week were revealed after the eliminations on the show. Once the number of contestants has been reduced to four, the act which received the lowest number votes is automatically eliminated from the competition (the judges do not have a vote; their only role is to comment on the performances).

=== Twists ===
Season	Twist
1	At the end of judges' houses, it was announced that Cowell would bring back one further act from his "Girls" category that he had eliminated at the judges' houses. He believed that he had made "a huge mistake" at judges' houses by not choosing the act for the live shows. The act was later revealed to be Melanie Amaro and therefore season one had a top 17 instead of a top 16. On the first live show, there was no public vote. Instead, each of the judges selected one of their own acts to eliminate. Cowell had to eliminate two acts because he included Amaro as a fifth contestant in his category.
2	Similar to season one, there was no public vote on the first live show and each of the mentors selected one of their own acts to eliminate. However, prior to the elimination of each category, each mentor selected two contestants from their own category as the bottom two. The bottom two acts performed another song of their choice in the "final showdown" and their mentor was required to eliminate one of them based on the performance. At the start of the second live show, it was announced that all judges agreed to bring back one further act who they felt should not have been eliminated on the first live show by the mentor. The act was later revealed to be Diamond White.
3	Just like the previous two seasons, there was no public vote or final showdown during the first live show. Instead, each of the judges selected one of their own acts to eliminate. At the start of the second live show, it was announced that all judges agreed to bring back one further act who they felt should not have been eliminated on the first live show by the mentor. The act was later revealed to be Josh Levi.

=== After The X Factor ===
The winner of the competition is awarded a recording contract with Syco Music in association with Sony Music Entertainment, which would include cash payments totaling $5 million. A press release on behalf of the show on February 7, 2011, called the recording contract "the largest guaranteed prize in television history." Unlike the British version of the show, the costs of recording and marketing the winning artist will be paid for separately from the $5 million initial contract payment. The $5 million will be paid directly to the winner in five annual installments of $1 million. Cowell said in a conference call with reporters on February 7, 2011: "I think it should be a life-changing prize and just to be clear, this isn't a dressed-up $5 million, this is a guaranteed $5 million payable to the winner. The recording, marketing, and video costs are completely separate to that. It will be paid over five years at $1 million a year." Cowell said in the same conference call that the specific music label within the Sony family that the winner signs with depends on which label could provide the best support to the winner with regard to the type of music the winner chooses to perform.

== Series overview ==
To date, three seasons have been broadcast, as summarized below.

Series	Originally aired		Winner^{1}	Runner-up^{1}	Winning Mentor
Series	First episode	Last episode	Winner^{1}	Runner-up^{1}	Winning Mentor
1	21 September 2011	22 December 2011	Melanie Amaro; Girls	Josh Krajcik; Over 30s	Simon Cowell
2	12 September 2012	20 December 2012	Tate Stevens; Over 25s	Carly Rose Sonenclar; Teens	L.A. Reid
3	11 September 2013	19 December 2013	Alex & Sierra; Groups	Jeff Gutt; Over 25s	Simon Cowell

== Judges and hosts ==
Hosts on The X Factor
Host	Season		
Host	1	2	3
Steve Jones	Host		
Mario Lopez		Host	
Khloe Kardashian		Host	

Judges on The X Factor
Judge	Season		
Judge	1	2	3
Simon Cowell			
L.A. Reid			
Paula Abdul			
Nicole Scherzinger			
Britney Spears			
Demi Lovato			
Kelly Rowland			
Paulina Rubio			
Cheryl Cole	Guest		
Louis Walsh		Guest	

=== Judges ===
At the time of announcing the American version of The X Factor, Simon Cowell was the only confirmed judge for the show. Eventually, Grammy Award-winning record executive, songwriter, and record producer L.A. Reid, former The X Factor UK judge Cheryl Cole, and Cowell's former American Idol colleague Paula Abdul were confirmed to join Cowell in the judging panel. However, Nicole Scherzinger would replace Cole on the judging panel after two audition sites.

After season one, the show's producers had said that they would undergo some changes which resulted in, what media outlets called, an "X Factor Shake-up". On January 30, 2012, it was announced that neither Abdul nor Scherzinger would return as a judge for season two When searching for replacements, Cowell sought to hire pop star Britney Spears as Abdul's replacement. After months of negotiations, Cowell and Spears came to an agreement for season two. Following the employment of Spears, Cowell was looking for a young superstar, in order to bring in a younger audience. On May 14, the show confirmed that Demi Lovato would replace Scherzinger.

On December 13, 2012, Reid announced that he would not be returning as a judge for a third season, instead opting to focus on Epic Records. Spears announced on January 11, 2013, that she would not be renewing her contract for another season, opting to focus on recording her eighth studio album. In March 2013, Lovato was announced to be joining Cowell on the panel again for season three. In April 2013, it was reported that former judge on The X Factor UK Kelly Rowland was the front-runner to replace Reid. In May 2013, the show officially confirmed that Rowland would replace Reid and Paulina Rubio would replace Spears and join Cowell and Lovato for the third season.

Judges gallery

Simon Cowell (2011–2013)

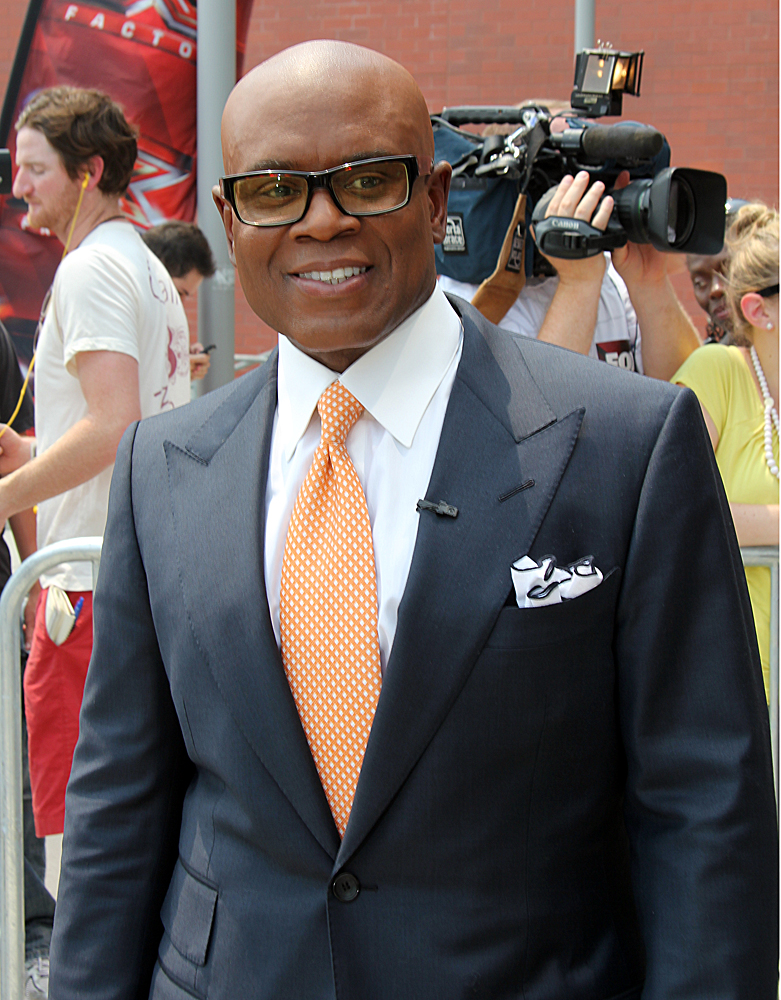
L.A. Reid (2011–2012)

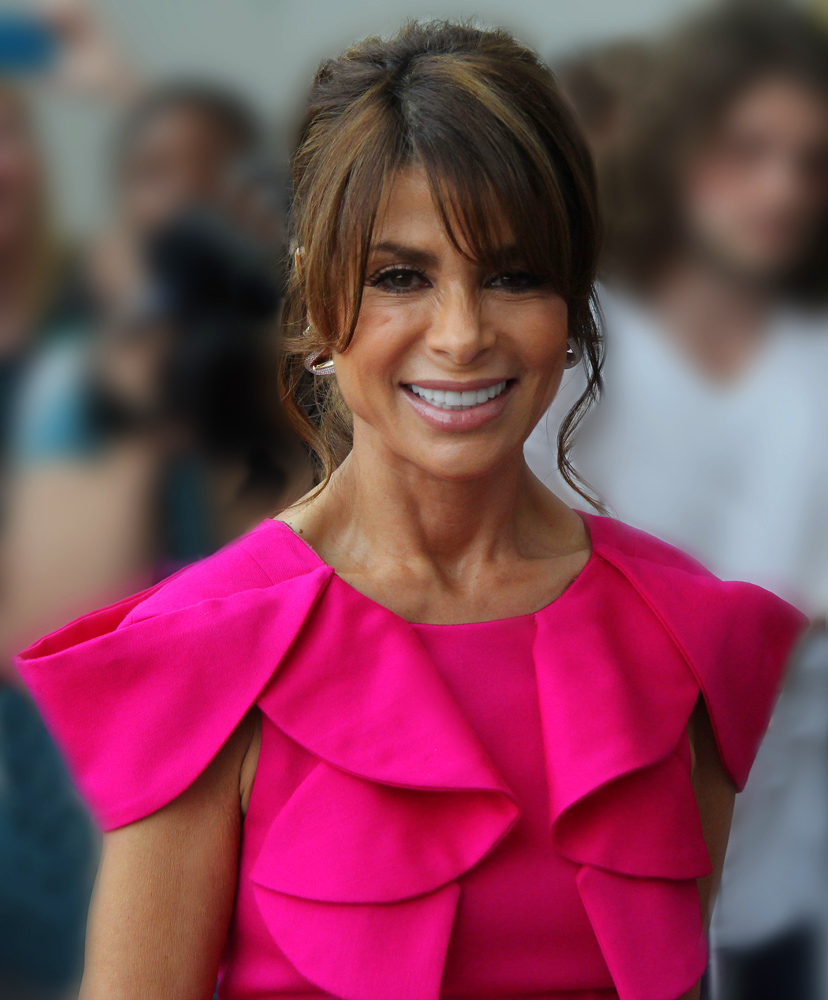
Paula Abdul (2011)

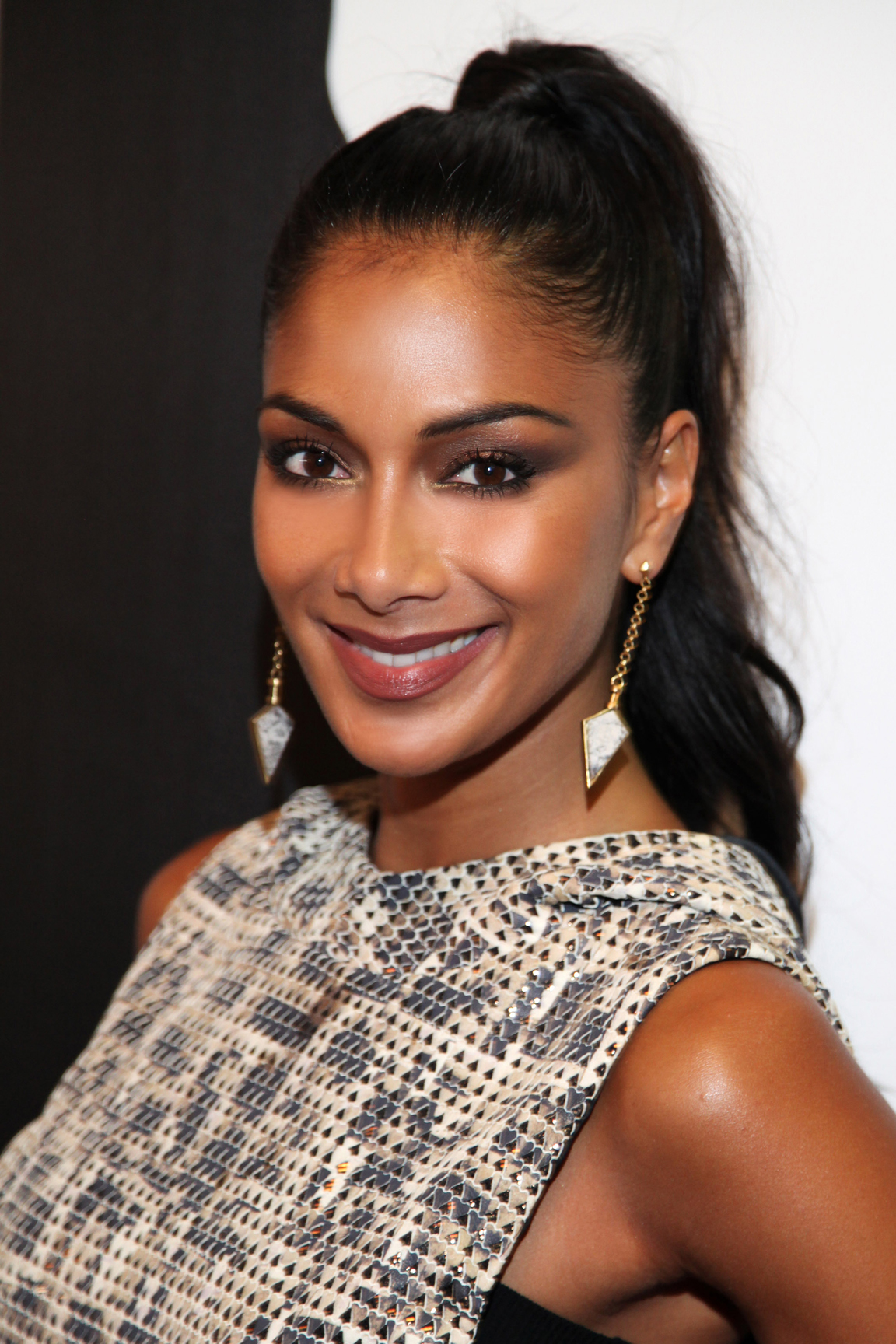
Nicole Scherzinger (2011)

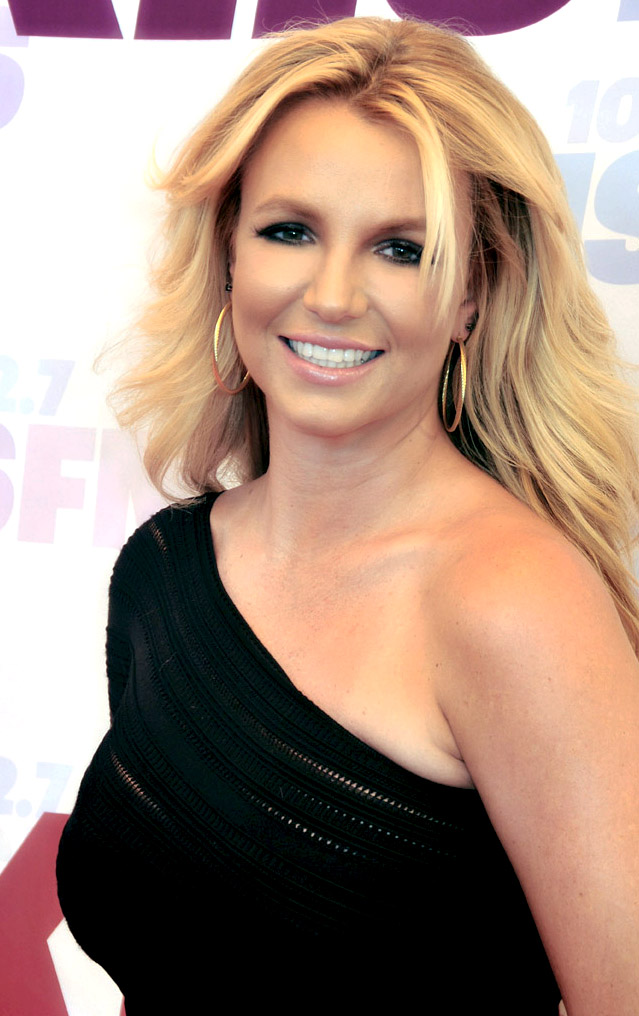
Britney Spears (2012)

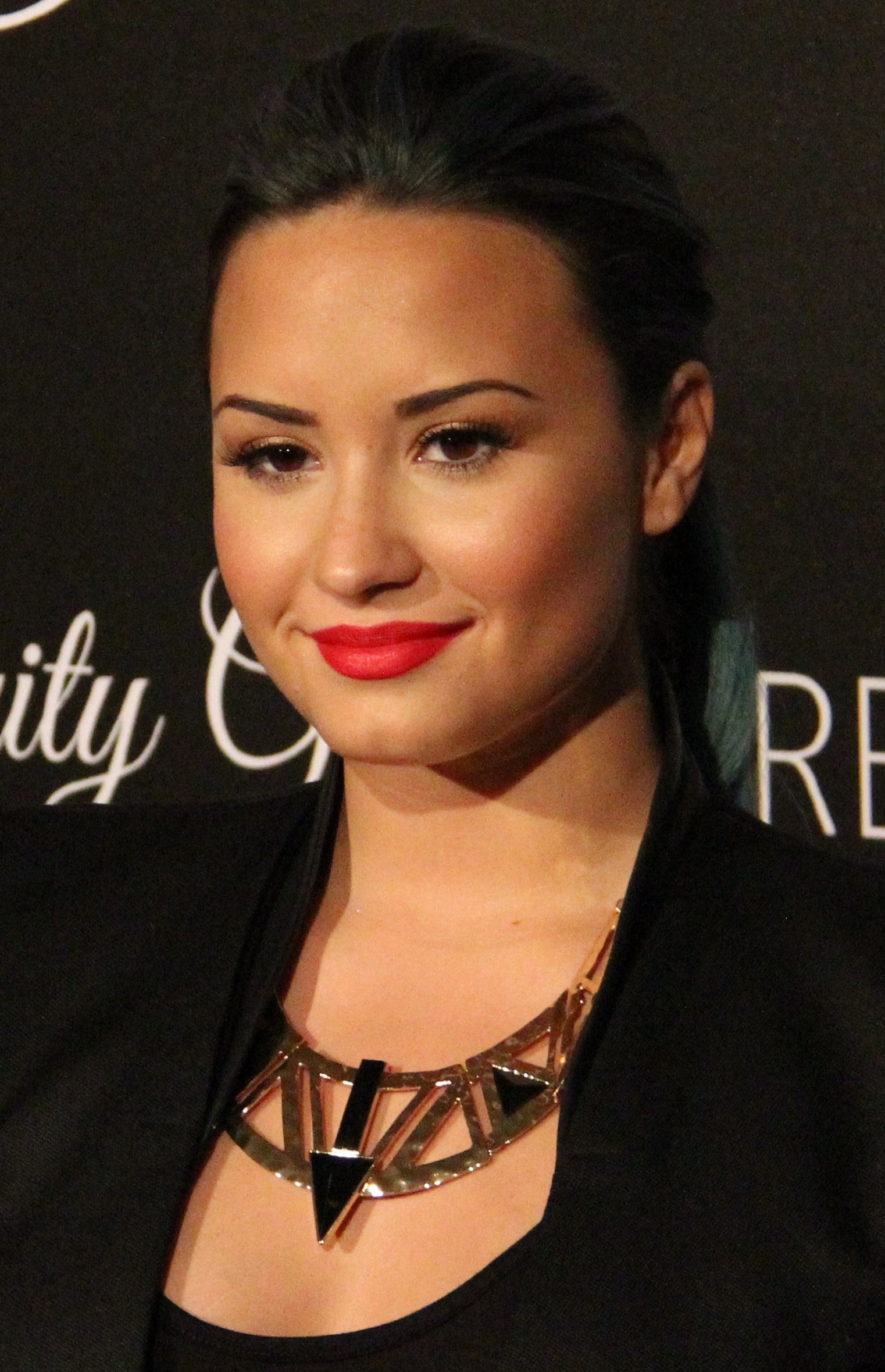
Demi Lovato (2012–2013)

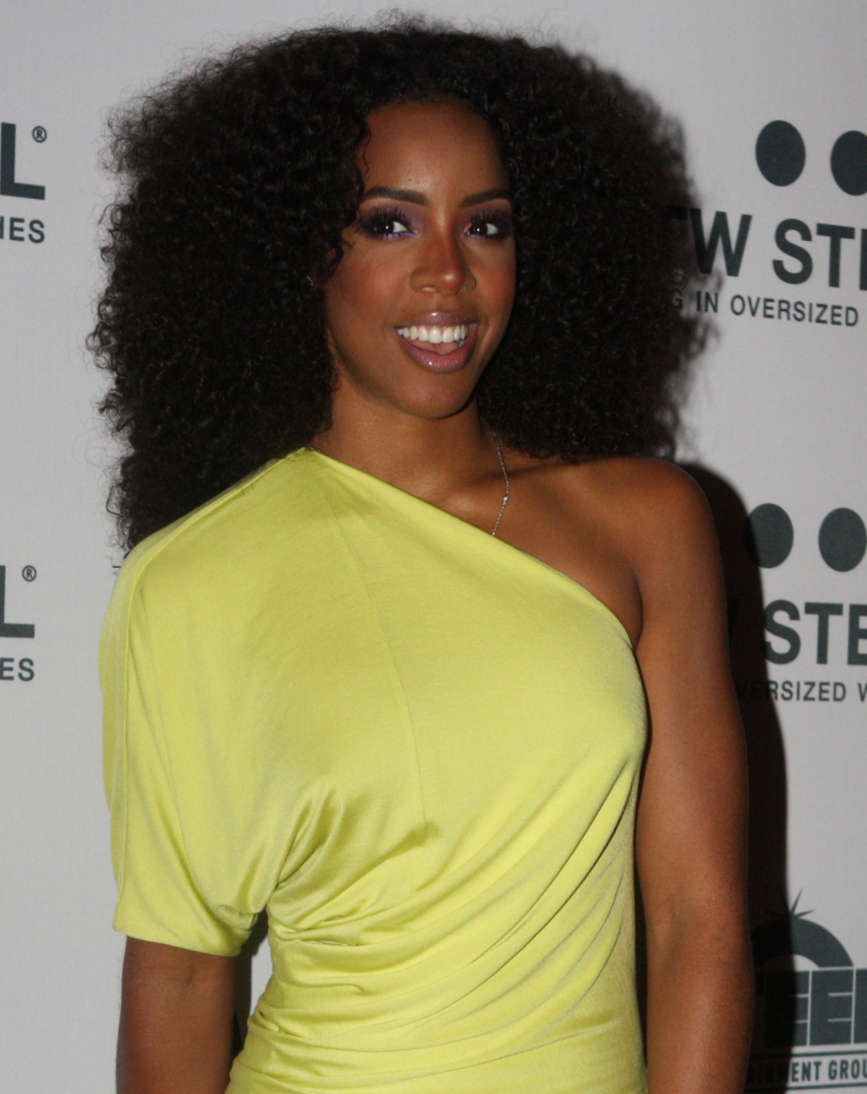
Kelly Rowland (2013)

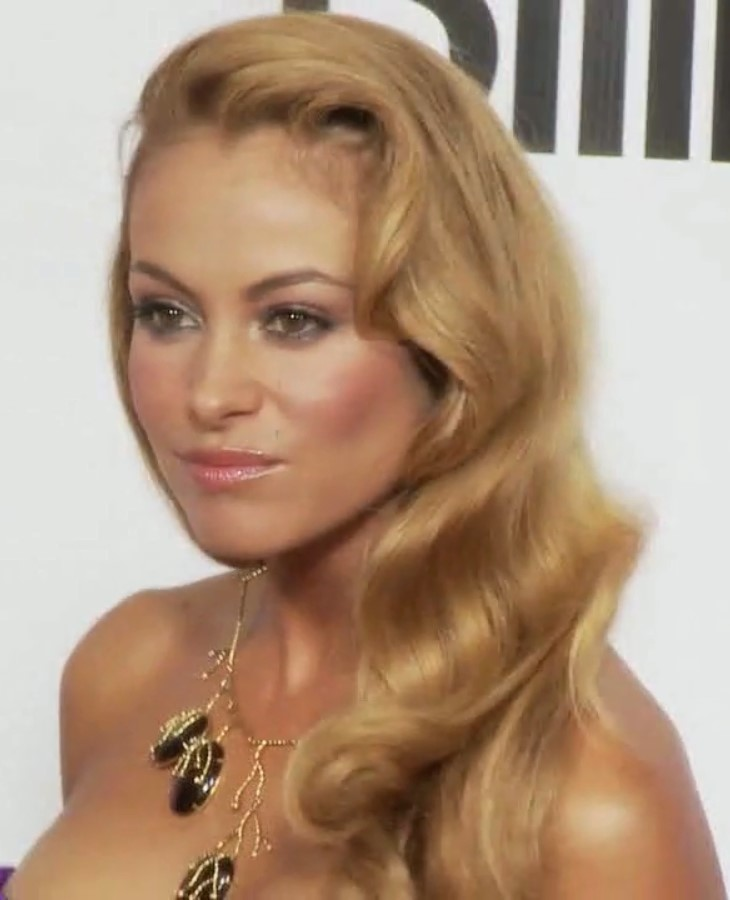
Paulina Rubio (2013)
Guest Judges gallery

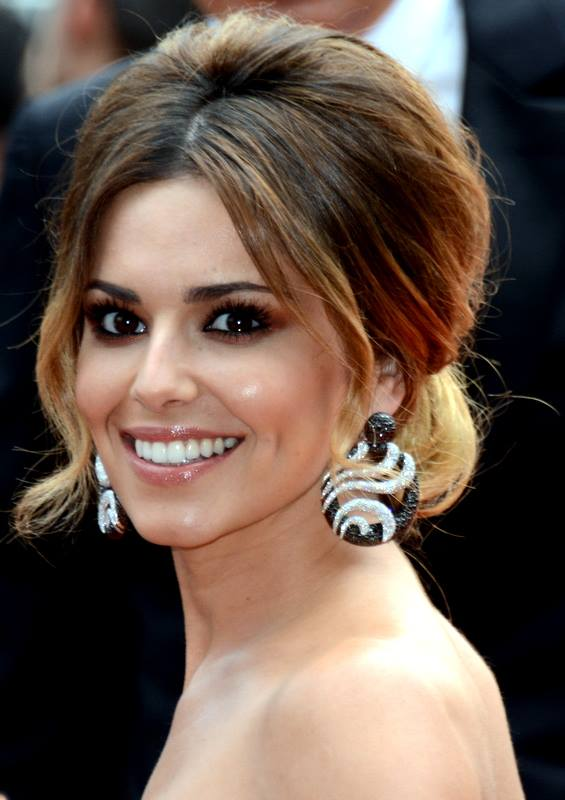
Cheryl Cole
(2011)

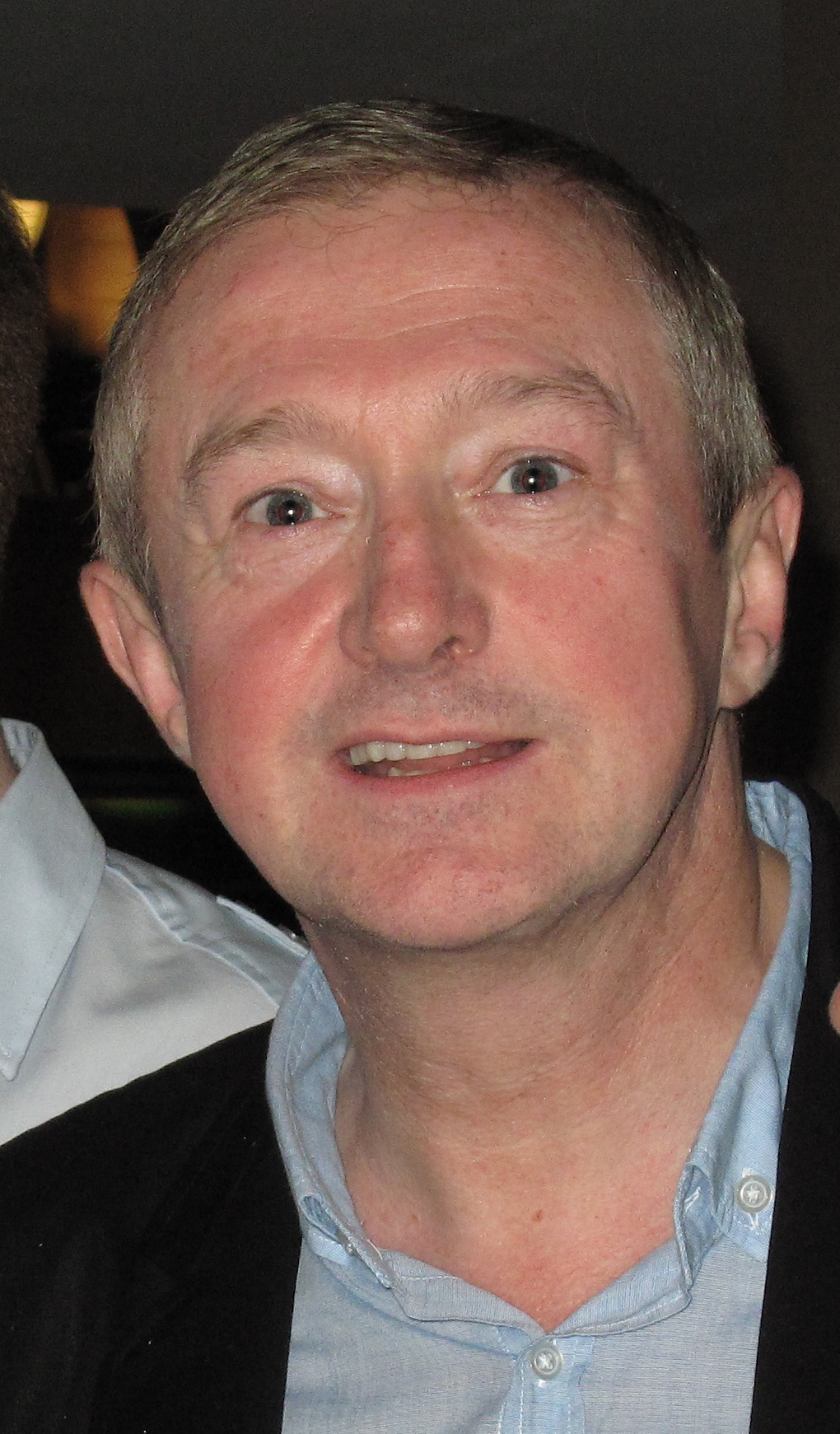
Louis Walsh
(2012)

=== Hosts ===
Cowell initially indicated that The X Factor may have two hosts. Numerous people were speculated to host the series, including High School Musical star Corbin Bleu, model Marisa Miller, and Dermot O'Leary, host of the UK show. On May 8, 2011, Nicole Scherzinger and Welsh presenter Steve Jones were announced as co-hosts of the show. However, Scherzinger would later replace Cheryl Cole on the judging panel.

After season one, Jones followed judges Paula Abdul and Scherzinger out the door as they were all dismissed from their duties on the show. Reality star Khloé Kardashian and Extra host Mario Lopez were confirmed as the two hosts hired, replacing Jones. The season two auditions, boot camp, and judges' houses phases of the show went on without hosts as they were not yet confirmed. On April 22, 2013, Fox announced that Lopez would return as sole host for season three after Kardashian was not asked back as co-host.

Hosts gallery

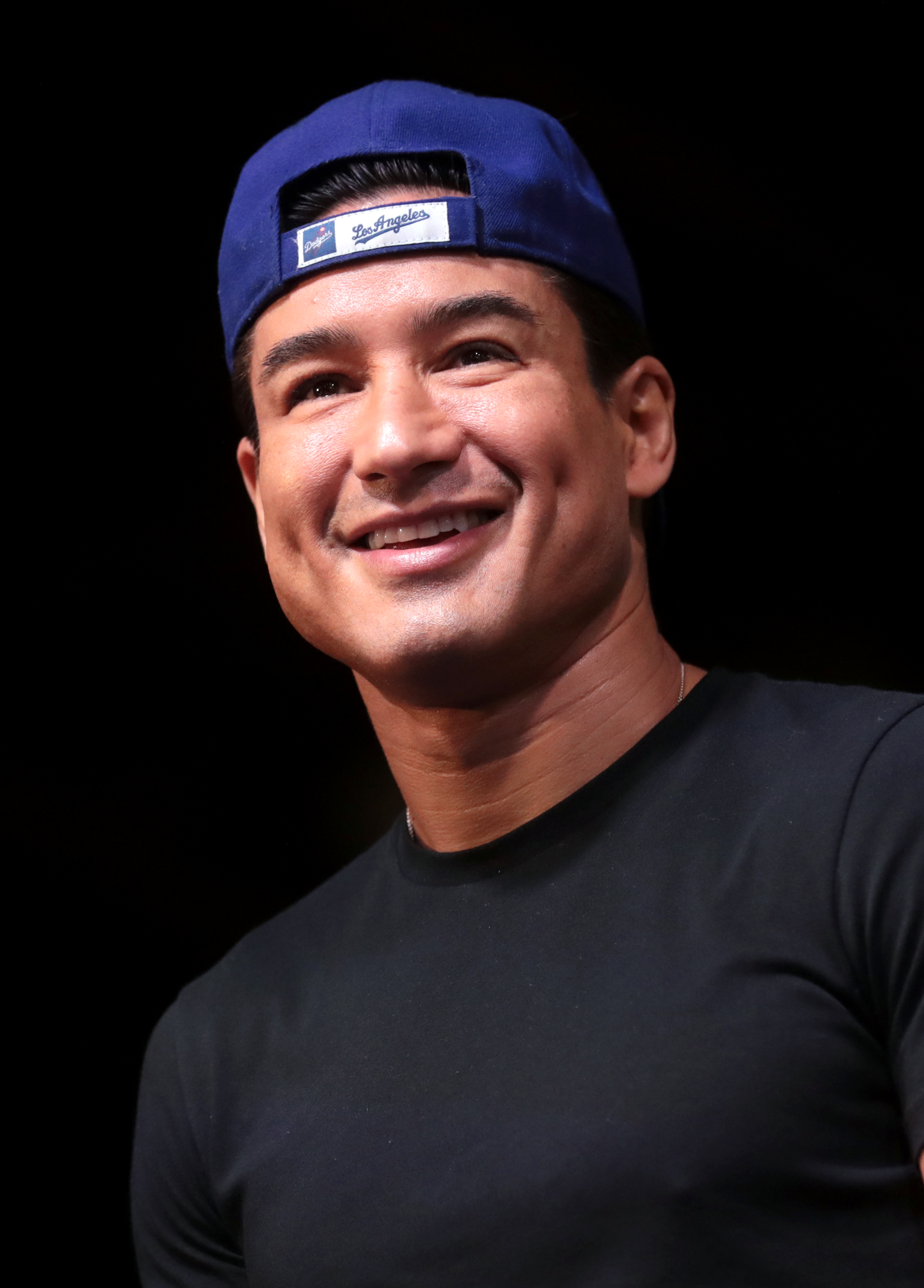
Mario Lopez (2012–2013)

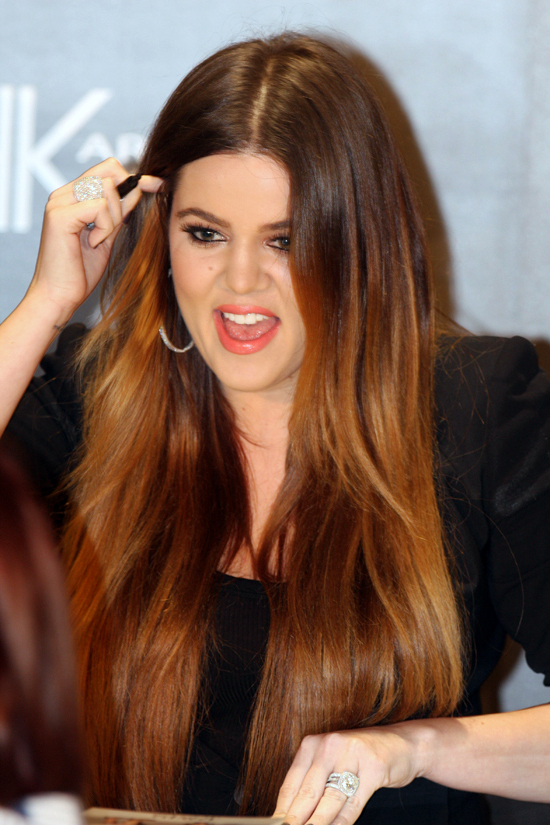
Khloé Kardashian (2012)

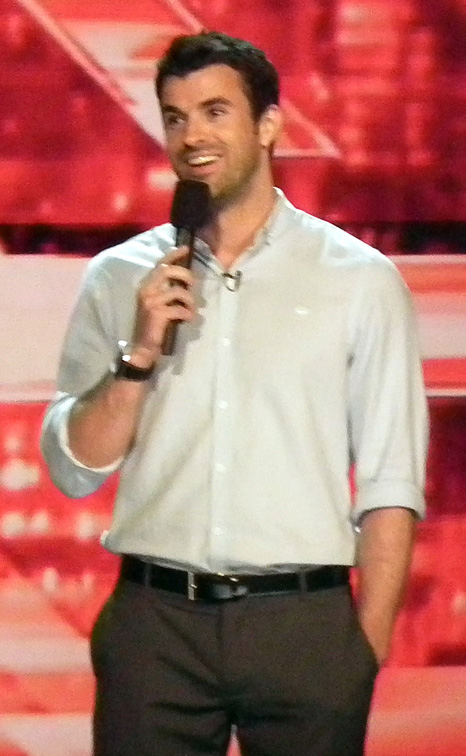
Steve Jones (2011)

=== Judges' categories and their contestants ===
In each season, each judge is allocated a category to mentor and chooses a small number of acts (four or five, depending on the season) to progress to the live finals. This table shows, for each season, which category each judge was allocated and which acts he or she put through to the live finals.

– Winning judge/category. Winners are in bold, eliminated contestants in small font.

Season	L.A. Reid	Nicole Scherzinger	Paula Abdul	Simon Cowell
1	**Boys**; Chris Rene; Marcus Canty; Astro; Phillip Lomax	**Over 30s** Josh Krajcik; LeRoy Bell; Stacy Francis; Dexter Haygood	**Groups**; Lakoda Rayne; The Stereo Hogzz; InTENsity; The Brewer Boys	**Girls**; **Melanie Amaro**; Rachel Crow; Drew; Simone Battle; Tiah Tolliver
2	L.A. Reid	Britney Spears	Demi Lovato	Simon Cowell
2	**Over 25s** **Tate Stevens**; Vino Alan; Jason Brock; David Correy	**Teens**; Carly Rose Sonenclar; Diamond White; Beatrice Miller; Arin Ray	**Young Adults**; CeCe Frey; Paige Thomas; Jennel Garcia; Willie Jones	**Groups**; Fifth Harmony; Emblem3; LYRIC 145; Sister C
3	Kelly Rowland	Paulina Rubio	Demi Lovato	Simon Cowell
3	**Over 25s** Jeff Gutt; Lillie McCloud; Rachel Potter; James Kenney	**Boys**; Carlito Olivero; Josh Levi; Tim Olstad; Carlos Guevara	**Girls**; Rion Paige; Ellona Santiago; Khaya Cohen; Danie Geimer	**Groups**; **Alex & Sierra**; Restless Road; Sweet Suspense; RoXxy Montana

== Pre-show ==
The Pepsi Pre-show Live is a podcast, sponsored by Pepsi, that is broadcast through the X Factor website one hour before every episode in the live rounds of the show. This program features behind-the-scenes looks backstage, acoustic performances, and interviews with celebrities, judges, contestants, and X Factor alumni. This program is hosted by Jesse Giddings, Adrienne Bailon, and Jim Cantiello.

== Reception ==
=== Television ratings ===
Seasonal rankings (based on average total viewers per episode) of The X Factor on Fox.

Each U.S. network television season starts in late September and ends in late May, which coincides with the completion of May sweeps.

Season	Premiered		Ended		TV season	Timeslot (ET)	Season ranking	Ref.
Season	Date	Viewers (in millions)	Date	Viewers (in millions)	TV season	Timeslot (ET)	Season ranking	Ref.
1	September 21, 2011	12.49	Final performances: December 21, 2011	12.67	2011–12	Wednesday 8:00 pm (performance show)	19	
1	September 21, 2011	12.49	Season finale: December 22, 2011	12.57	2011–12	Thursday 8:00 pm (results show)	20	
2	September 12, 2012	8.73	Final performances: December 19, 2012	8.35	2012–13	Wednesday 8:00 pm (performance show)	39	
2	September 12, 2012	8.73	Season finale: December 20, 2012	9.65	2012–13	Thursday 8:00 pm (results show)	40	
3	September 11, 2013	6.45	Final performances: December 18, 2013	5.04	2013–14	Wednesday 8:00 pm (performance show)	61	
3	September 11, 2013	6.45	Season finale: December 19, 2013	6.22	2013–14	Thursday 8:00 pm (results show)	72	

The show was also broadcast on ITV2 in the united Kingdom, season 1 proved popular launching just 1 day after the American launch date

=== Awards and nominations ===
At the 2012 Teen Choice Awards, The X Factor beat rival shows American Idol and The Voice to take the award for Reality Competition Show. The X Factor also won the award for Breakout Show, and Simon Cowell won the Male Personality award.

Year	Association	Category	Nominee	Result
2012	Teen Choice Awards	Reality Competition Show	The X Factor	Won
2012	Teen Choice Awards	Breakout Show	The X Factor	Won
2012	Teen Choice Awards	Male Personality	Simon Cowell	Won
2012	Teen Choice Awards	Female Reality Star	Melanie Amaro	Nominated
2013	People's Choice Awards	Favorite TV Competition Show	The X Factor	Won
2013	People's Choice Awards	Favorite Celebrity Judge	Demi Lovato	Won
2013	People's Choice Awards	Favorite Celebrity Judge	Britney Spears	Nominated
2013	Kids' Choice Awards	Favorite Villain	Simon Cowell	Won
2013	Teen Choice Awards	Reality Competition Show	The X Factor	Won
2013	Teen Choice Awards	Female Artist	Demi Lovato	Won
2013	Teen Choice Awards	Female Hottie	Demi Lovato	Nominated
2013	Teen Choice Awards	Smile	Demi Lovato	Nominated
2013	Teen Choice Awards	Male Personality	Simon Cowell	Won
2013	Teen Choice Awards	Female Personality	Demi Lovato	Won
2013	Teen Choice Awards	Breakout Group	Emblem3	Won
2013	Teen Choice Awards	Choice Style Icon	Demi Lovato	Won
2013	Teen Choice Awards	Choice Single: Female Artist	Demi Lovato	Won

== Controversies ==
In the quarter-final of season one, Scherzinger voted to eliminate contestant Rachel Crow from the show over Marcus Canty; this sent the result to deadlock. Following this, Crow was eliminated and Scherzinger was booed off the stage and her future on the show was put in jeopardy. She subsequently received death threats from some viewers. Scherzinger had been proven to be an unpopular judge, with her performance during the season being panned by critics, as well as controversy even before the show airing, regarding her replacing Cheryl Cole on the judging panel. Scherzinger was let go at the end of the season and later transferred to the UK show to replace Kelly Rowland for the 2012 UK series. On the UK show, Scherzinger became a more popular and successful judge.

The airing of the season two judges' houses episode on October 17, 2012, was cut short abruptly in the middle of Lovato's selection for the top 16 to return to MLB on Fox coverage of Game 3 of the 2012 National League Championship Series, which had been in a lengthy rain delay and restarted (the game started at 4 p.m. ET so that Fox could run their primetime lineup upon the game's completion). After viewer complaints and a Twitter message from Cowell that consisted of his reaction being "It's what's known as a total f up," the episode was re-aired the next week in full.

In season three, due to graphics errors made in the top 13 round of the live shows regarding voting, all voting results posted in that episode were invalidated, and the contestants sang once more on November 7, 2013, show, with the results revealed on November 13.

== International broadcasts ==
Following the announcement of the show coming to America, several other broadcasters around the world expressed interest in acquiring the rights to show the American version of the show in their country. The below-mentioned countries may have their own version of The X Factor, dubbed equally or under another name.

- Brazil: Premiered on October 11, 2011, on Canal Sony
- Bulgaria: Season one premiered Saturday, November 3, 2012, on FOX
- Canada: Simultaneously broadcast with the Fox broadcast on CTV (on Wednesday) or CTV Two (on Thursday). (for the third season, shown only on CTV Two)
- Cyprus: Premiered on September 30, 2011, on RIK 1
- Czech Republic: Season two premiered on September 15, 2012, on Prima Love
- Denmark: Premiered on October 1, 2011, on DR HD
- Estonia: Premiered on October 9, 2011, and is broadcast on every Sunday on TV3
- Finland: Premiered on October 4, 2011, and is broadcast on Tuesday and Friday on Sub
- Greece: Premiered on October 1, 2011, on ANT1
- Hungary: Premiered on October 1, 2011, and is broadcast on every Sunday and Saturday on RTL Klub
- India: Premiered on September 22, 2011, and is simulcast on Big CBS Prime, Love and Spark.
- Indonesia: A group of local TV networks is airing the shows the same week it is aired in America; in Jakarta it airs on B Channel (now RTV) on Thursday and Friday, with repeats on Saturday and Sunday.
- Ireland: Premiered on September 13, 2011, on TV3 and is broadcast every Friday. Also airs on ITV2 (see UK section).
- Israel: Premiered on September 14, 2011, and is broadcast on Friday and Saturday on Hot 3
- Iran: Premiered on December 20, 2012, and is broadcast on Thursday and Friday on GEM TV
- Japan: Premiered on October 1, 2011, on FOX bs238
- Latin America: Premiered on October 12, 2011, on Sony Channel. Season 2 premiered on October 26, 2012, also on Sony Channel.
- Latvia: Premiered on December 1, 2012, on Channel 2
- Malaysia: Premiered on September 23, 2011, on 8TV
- Middle East: Same day telecast as the U.S. Premiered on September 24, 2011, on OSN First after it is aired in the U.S., on Space Power TV and MBC+ Variety and MBC Persia and MBC 4 and Dubai One
- New Zealand: Broadcast six and a half hours after it is aired in the U.S., on TV3
- Philippines: Premiered on September 22, 2011, on Studio 23 (now ABS-CBN Sports+Action).
- Poland: Premiered on October 11, 2011, on Fox Life and is broadcast every Tuesday
- Portugal: Airs on SIC Mulher
- Russia: Premiered on January 2, 2012, and is broadcast on Monday to Friday on MTV
- Singapore: Same day telecast as the U.S. on MediaCorp Channel 5
- Serbia: Premiered on November 2, 2012, on FOX Serbia.
- Slovakia: Premiered on September 23, 2011, on JOJ Plus; season two premiered September 14, 2012 on TV JOJ (broadcast in Slovakia 24 hours after it is aired in the U.S.)
- South Africa: Broadcast on SABC 1
- Thailand: Broadcast on Workpoint TV (Season 1), RTL CBS Entertainment
- Turkey: Broadcast on Dizimax Entertainment
- Trinidad and Tobago: Airs on CNC3
- United Kingdom and Ireland: As part of Cowell's contract, it was agreed that ITV2, the sister channel to the ITV network (which airs the original British version of The X Factor), would have rights to air the U.S. version. The first season was broadcast in the UK 18 hours after the U.S. airing – it premiered on September 22, 2011, in the UK and airs on Thursday and Friday nights. The second season premiered on September 27, 2012, meaning there was initially a delay of two weeks after the U.S. airing. From the live shows onwards, this gap has again reduced to 48 hours. Season 3 premiered on September 20, 2013, nine days after the U.S. premiere.

== Sponsorship ==
On January 7, 2011, Fox, SYCOtv and FremantleMedia North America announced that Pepsi would be the official sponsor of The X Factor. The sponsorship included an extensive multi-platform on and off-air marketing partnership. On June 9, Chevrolet was announced as the second official sponsor of the show. Chevrolet's sponsorship would also include an extensive multi-platform on and off-air marketing partnership. Sony was confirmed as the third official sponsor on July 26. Sony's sponsorship of The X Factor would also include an extensive multi-platform on and off-air marketing partnership. Verizon also sponsored the show; they were the official wireless sponsor.

In 2012, the show was the second-highest revenue earning show of the year, with US$5.55 million ad revenue per half-hour, behind American Idol.

For the third season, Honda and Procter & Gamble replaced the previous major sponsors of the show, with Procter & Gamble using it as a platform to promote its CoverGirl, Herbal Essences and Secret personal care brands.

== Potential revival ==
In November 2014, it was reported that Cowell was considering re-launching the American version in 2015, though this was proved untrue. However, Cowell has said he was more than willing to give the American version another go, and that they received offers to bring it back on other networks, though he said he would bring it back when there is less competition in the TV talent show landscape. In December 2022, The U.S. Sun reported that, while an official deal has yet to be reached, Cowell was in talks with NBC, which had offered to revive the American version of The X Factor.

== See also ==
- The X Factor - British version of the reality television music competition series from 2004 to 2018.
