= Pepsi Challenge =

Marketing campaign, originally versus Coke taste test

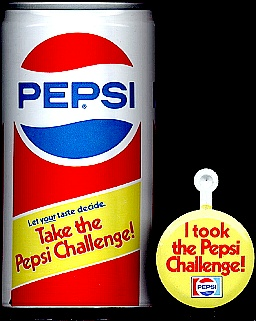
An early 1980s "Pepsi Challenge" 12 oz (355 ml) promotional can, and a metal tab button publicizing the challenge.

The Pepsi Challenge is an ongoing United States marketing promotion run by PepsiCo since 1975.

== Method ==
The challenge originally took the form of a single blind taste test. At malls, shopping centers, and other public locations, a Pepsi representative would set up a table with two white cups, one containing Pepsi and one containing Coca-Cola. Shoppers were encouraged to taste both colas and select which they preferred. The representative then revealed which soda the taster selected, Coke or Pepsi. The results of the test leaned toward a consensus that Pepsi was preferred by more Americans, which led people to claim that Pepsi was better than Coke. The Pepsi Challenge has been featured in much of Pepsi's TV advertising.

== History ==
The challenge launched in 1975, as part of the ongoing Cola wars between Pepsi and The Coca-Cola Company.

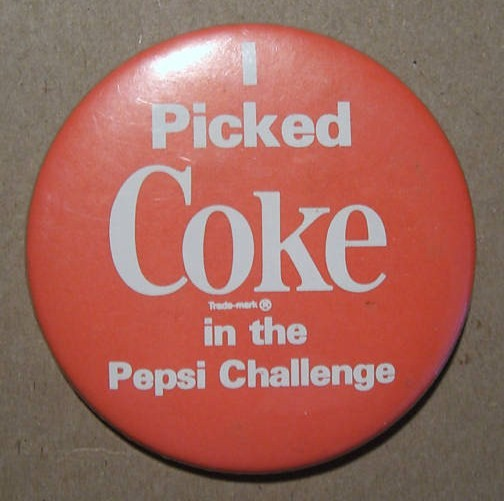
A Coca-Cola pinback button, "I picked Coke in the Pepsi Challenge."

In his book Blink: The Power of Thinking Without Thinking (2005), Canadian author Malcolm Gladwell presents evidence that suggests Pepsi's success over Coca-Cola in the "Pepsi Challenge" is a result of the flawed nature of the "sip test" method. His research shows that tasters will generally prefer the sweeter of two beverages based on a single sip, even if they prefer a less sweet beverage over the course of an entire can. Additionally, the challenge more often than not labeled the Pepsi cup with an "M" and the Coca-Cola cup with a "Q," suggesting letter preference may drive some of the results. Donald M. Kendall of Pepsi promoted the Pepsi Challenge.

When the preference in blind tests is compared to tests wherein cups are labeled with arbitrary labels (e.g., S or L) or brand names, the ratings of preference change. Scientific findings do support a perceptible difference between Coca-Cola and Pepsi, but not between Pepsi and RC Cola.

In his book Bad Habits, humorist Dave Barry describes the Pepsi challenge as, "Pepsi’s ongoing misguided attempt to convince the general public that Coke and Pepsi are not the same thing, which of course they are."

In 2015, Pepsi re-launched the Pepsi Challenge on social media. As part of this year long promotion, Pepsi signed various celebrity ambassadors to advertise their product on their social media accounts under the hashtag #PepsiChallenge.

In 2025, Pepsi said that they were going to revive the Pepsi Challenge again, starting with New Orleans for Super Bowl LIX. In March, they'll start a nationwide campaign in major cities like Los Angeles, Dallas and Houston. However, instead of the originals, the Challenge will include sugar-free variations of the two drinks: Pepsi Zero Sugar and Coca-Cola Zero Sugar. In 2026, the Pepsi Challenge was featured in a Super Bowl LX commercial where a Coca-Cola polar bear chose Pepsi over Coca-Cola.

== Contest ==
In 1981, Pepsi ran a "Pepsi Challenge Payoff" contest that would hand out a large prize to anyone who could gather Pepsi bottle caps that spelled out the word “Challenge".

== See also ==
- Cola Wars
- New Coke
- Pepsi Cool Cans
- Pepsi Stuff
