= The X Factor (American TV series) discography =

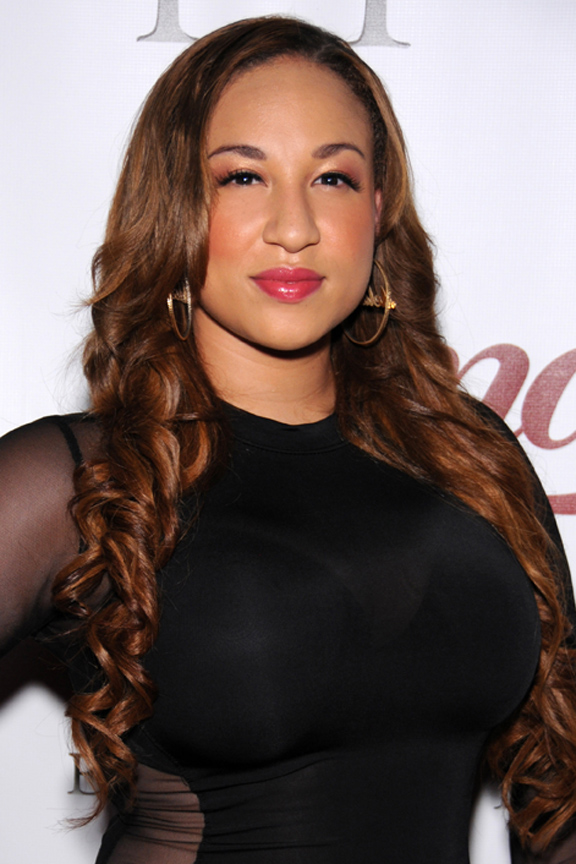
Melanie Amaro, the season 1 winner, has released three singles.

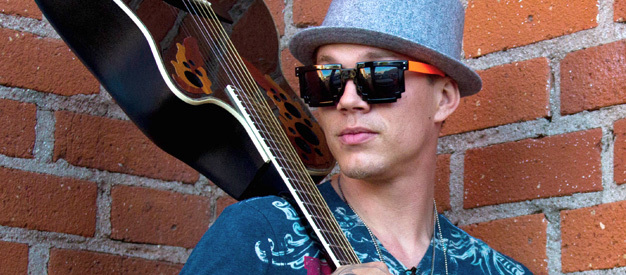
Chris Rene came in third place in season 1; he has released an extended play and three singles.

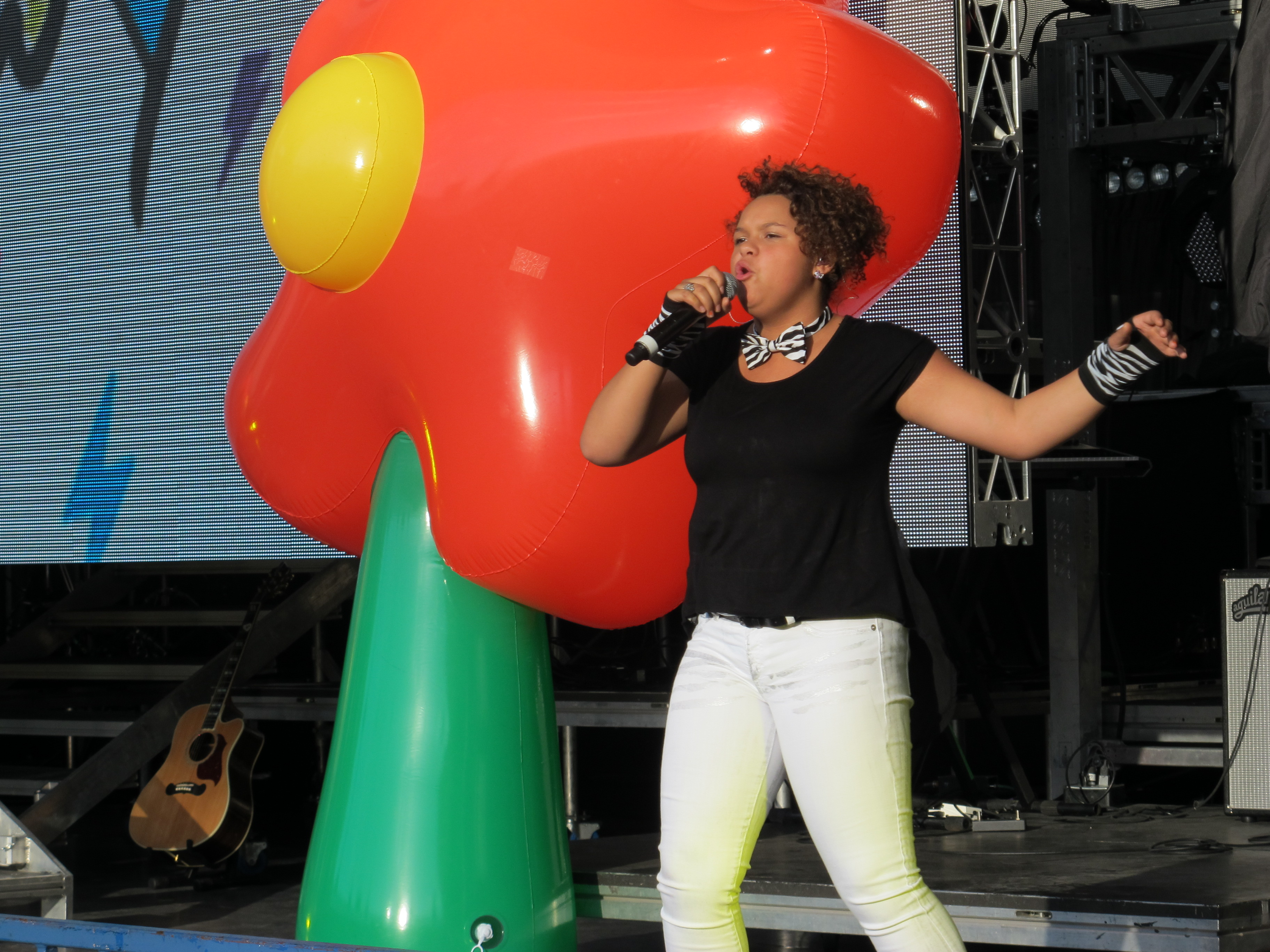
Rachel Crow, who came in fifth place in season 1, has released an extended play and one single.

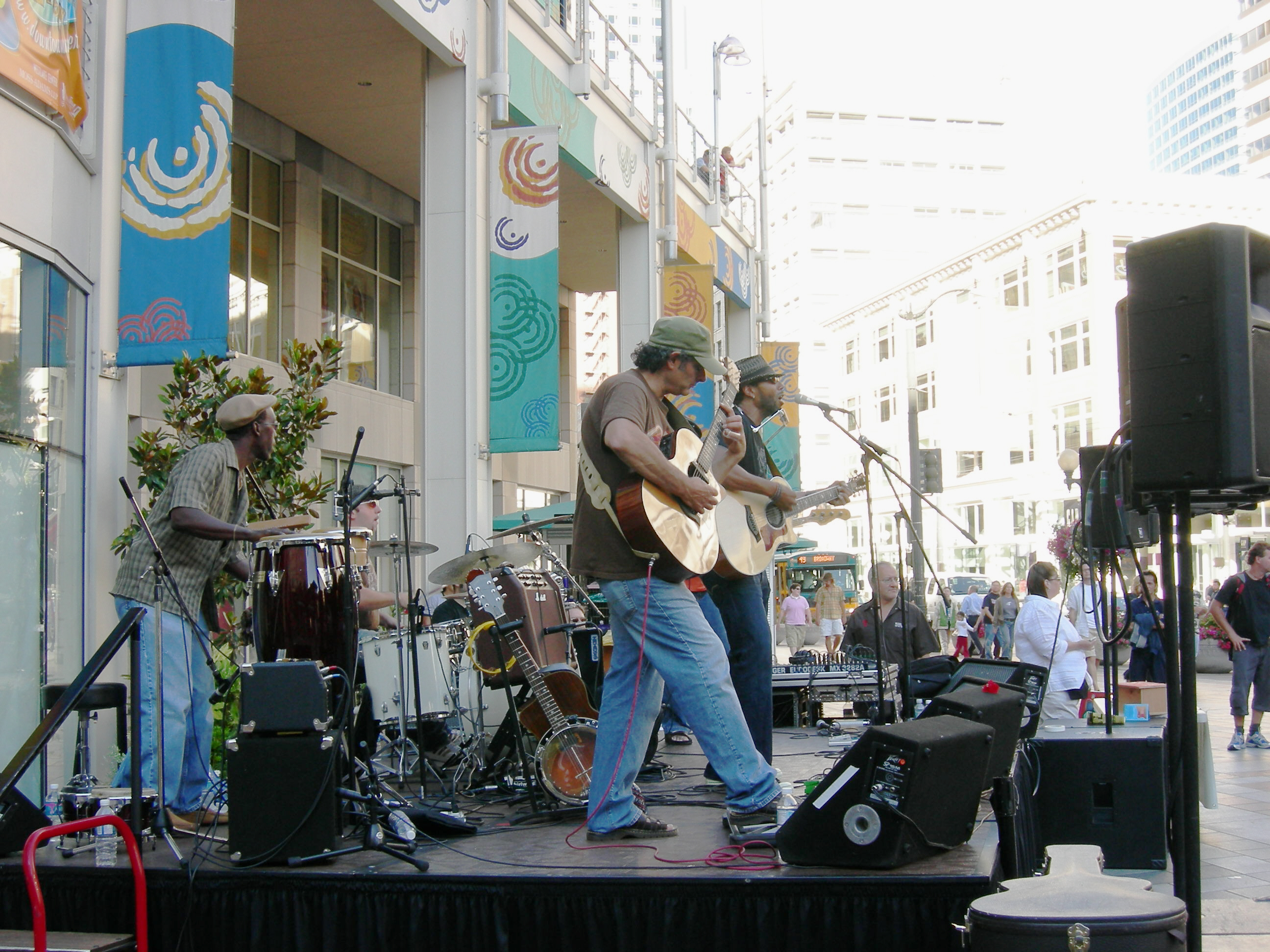
LeRoy Bell finished in eighth place in season 1 and has released two albums and one single.

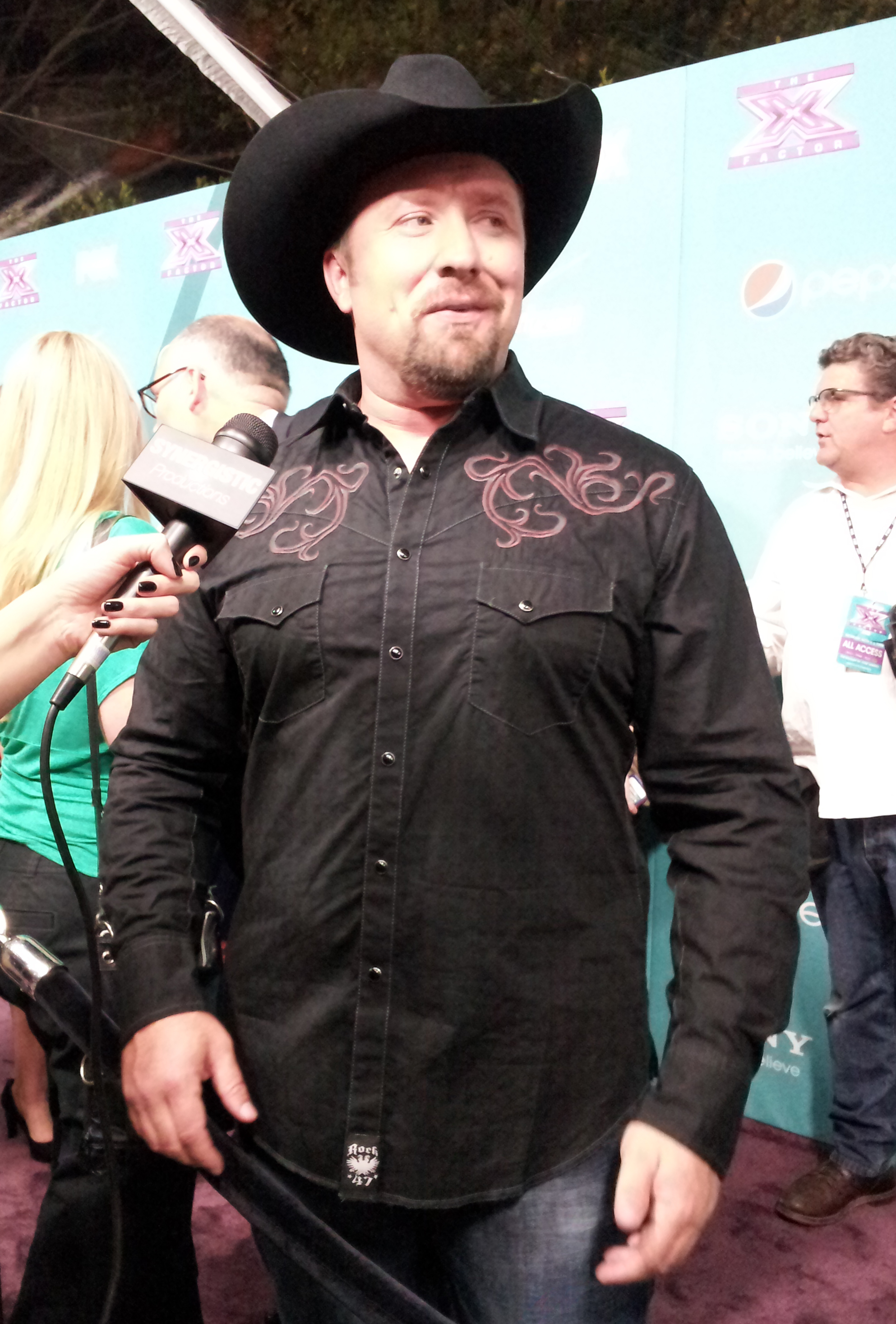
Tate Stevens, the season 2 winner, has released one album and one single.

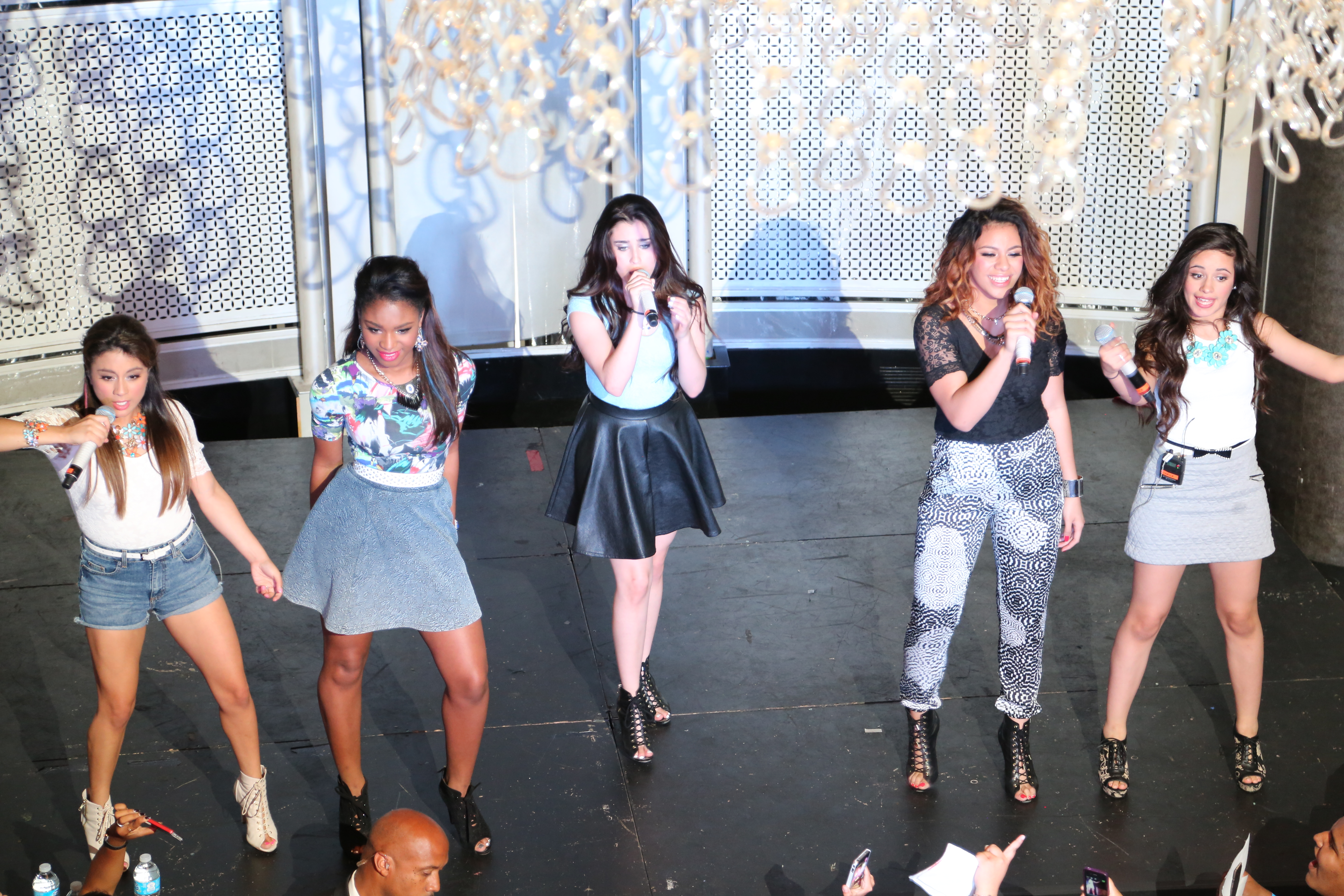
Fifth Harmony came in third place in season 2. They have released three albums, one extended play, and ten singles. They are the most successful act to have appeared on the American version of the show; they have won several awards and have several platinum and gold certifications.

The X Factor is an American television singing talent show broadcast from 2011 until 2013. The winners and finalists of the seasons have had varied levels of success with their careers.

== Singles ==
| Artist | Season | Position in show | Song title | U.S. release date | U.S. peak chart position | Ref(s) |
|---|---|---|---|---|---|---|
| Melanie Amaro | 1 | Winner | "Don't Fail Me Now" / "Love Me Now" | September 18, 2012 | DNC | |
| Melanie Amaro | 1 | Winner | "Long Distance" | December 3, 2012 | DNC | |
| Josh Krajcik | 1 | Runner-up | "One Thing She'll Never Know" | November 29, 2012 | DNC | |
| Josh Krajcik | 1 | Runner-up | "Back Where We Belong" | March 5, 2013 | DNC | |
| Chris Rene | 1 | 3rd | "Young Homie" | March 13, 2012 | 101 | |
| Chris Rene | 1 | 3rd | "Trouble" | June 26, 2012 | DNC | |
| Chris Rene | 1 | 3rd | "Rockin' with You" | October 9, 2012 | DNC | |
| Marcus Canty | 1 | 4th | "Won't Make a Fool Out of You" | March 7, 2012 | DNC | |
| Marcus Canty | 1 | 4th | "In & Out" | July 31, 2012 | DNC | |
| Marcus Canty | 1 | 4th | "Used by You" | December 11, 2012 | DNC | |
| Rachel Crow | 1 | 5th | "Mean Girls" | June 26, 2012 | DNC | |
| Drew Ryniewicz | 1 | 6th | "Illuminate Me" | April 7, 2014 | DNC | |
| LeRoy Bell | 1 | 8th | "One More Chance" | October 1, 2012 | DNC | |
| Lakoda Rayne | 1 | 9th | "Emergency Brake" | September 18, 2012 | DNC | |
| Fletcher | 1 | 9th (As part of Lakoda Rayne) | "Undrunk" | January 25, 2019 | 61 | |
| Stacy Francis | 1 | 10th | "Purple Rain" | May 29, 2012 | DNC | |
| Stacy Francis | 1 | 10th | "I Am the Change" | August 7, 2012 | DNC | |
| Simone Battle | 1 | 13th (joint) | "He Likes Boys" | October 28, 2012 | DNC | |
| Simone Battle | 1 | 13th (joint) | "Wild Wild Love" | March 18, 2014 | 30 | |
| Simone Battle | 1 | 13th (joint) | "Ugly Heart" | June 3, 2014 | 107 | |
| The Brewer Boys | 1 | 13th (joint) | "The Christmas Song / Mistletoe" | October 1, 2012 | DNC | |
| Tiah Tolliver | 1 | 13th (joint) | "I" | June 19, 2012 | DNC | |
| Tate Stevens | 2 | Winner | "Power of a Love Song" | March 12, 2013 | DNC | |
| Fifth Harmony | 2 | 3rd | "Miss Movin' On" | June 15, 2013 | 76 | |
| Fifth Harmony | 2 | 3rd | "Boss" | July 8, 2014 | 43 | |
| Fifth Harmony | 2 | 3rd | "Sledgehammer" | October 28, 2014 | 40 | |
| Fifth Harmony | 2 | 3rd | "Worth It" | March 3, 2015 | 12 | |
| Fifth Harmony | 2 | 3rd | "Work from Home" | February 26, 2016 | 4 | |
| Fifth Harmony | 2 | 3rd | "All in My Head (Flex)" | July 9, 2016 | 24 | |
| Fifth Harmony | 2 | 3rd | "That's My Girl" | September 27, 2016 | 73 | |
| Fifth Harmony | 2 | 3rd | "Down" | June 2, 2017 | 42 | |
| Fifth Harmony | 2 | 3rd | "He Like That" | September 19, 2017 | DNC | |
| Fifth Harmony | 2 | 3rd | "Por Favor" | October 27, 2017 | DNC | |
| Fifth Harmony | 2 | 3rd | ''Don't Say You Love Me" | May 18, 2018 | DNC | |
| Camila Cabello | 2 | 3rd (As part of Fifth Harmony) | "I Know What You Did Last Summer" | November 18, 2015 | 20 | |
| Camila Cabello | 2 | 3rd (As part of Fifth Harmony) | "Bad Things" | October 14, 2016 | 4 | |
| Camila Cabello | 2 | 3rd (As part of Fifth Harmony) | "Crying in the Club" | May 19, 2017 | 47 | |
| Camila Cabello | 2 | 3rd (As part of Fifth Harmony) | "Havana" | August 6, 2017 | 1 | |
| Camila Cabello | 2 | 3rd (As part of Fifth Harmony) | "Never Be the Same" | December 7, 2017 | 6 | |
| Camila Cabello | 2 | 3rd (As part of Fifth Harmony) | "Sangria Wine" | May 18, 2018 | 83 | |
| Camila Cabello | 2 | 3rd (As part of Fifth Harmony) | "Consequences" | October 9, 2018 | 51 | |
| Camila Cabello | 2 | 3rd (As part of Fifth Harmony) | "Mi Persona Favorita" | March 28, 2019 | DNC | |
| Camila Cabello | 2 | 3rd (As part of Fifth Harmony) | "Find U Again" | May 30, 2019 | 102 | |
| Camila Cabello | 2 | 3rd (As part of Fifth Harmony) | "Señorita" | June 21, 2019 | 1 | |
| Camila Cabello | 2 | 3rd (As part of Fifth Harmony) | "South of the Border" | July 12, 2019 | 49 | |
| Camila Cabello | 2 | 3rd (As part of Fifth Harmony) | "Shameless" | September 5, 2019 | 60 | |
| Camila Cabello | 2 | 3rd (As part of Fifth Harmony) | "Liar" | September 5, 2019 | 52 | |
| Camila Cabello | 2 | 3rd (As part of Fifth Harmony) | "Cry for Me" | October 4, 2019 | 115 | |
| Camila Cabello | 2 | 3rd (As part of Fifth Harmony) | "Easy" | October 11, 2019 | 110 | |
| Camila Cabello | 2 | 3rd (As part of Fifth Harmony) | "Living Proof" | November 15, 2019 | DNC | |
| Camila Cabello | 2 | 3rd (As part of Fifth Harmony) | "My Oh My" | January 6, 2020 | 12 | |
| Camila Cabello | 2 | 3rd (As part of Fifth Harmony) | "First Man " | June 21, 2020 | 94 | |
| Camila Cabello | 2 | 3rd (As part of Fifth Harmony) | "Don't Go Yet" | July 23, 2021 | 42 | |
| Camila Cabello | 2 | 3rd (As part of Fifth Harmony) | "Bam Bam" | March 4, 2022 | 21 | |
| Camila Cabello | 2 | 3rd (As part of Fifth Harmony) | "Psychofreak" | April 8, 2022 | 75 | |
| Camila Cabello | 2 | 3rd (As part of Fifth Harmony) | "I Luv It" | March 27, 2024 | 81 | |
| Lauren Jauregui | 2 | 3rd (As part of Fifth Harmony) | "Back to Me" | December 9, 2016 | DNC | |
| Lauren Jauregui | 2 | 3rd (As part of Fifth Harmony) | "Strangers" | May 26, 2017 | 100 | |
| Lauren Jauregui | 2 | 3rd (As part of Fifth Harmony) | ''Expectations" | October 24, 2018 | DNC | |
| Lauren Jauregui | 2 | 3rd (As part of Fifth Harmony) | "More Than That" | January 11, 2019 | DNC | |
| Lauren Jauregui | 2 | 3rd (As part of Fifth Harmony) | "Let Me Know" | December 4, 2019 | DNC | |
| Lauren Jauregui | 2 | 3rd (As part of Fifth Harmony) | "Nada" | February 21, 2020 | DNC | |
| Lauren Jauregui | 2 | 3rd (As part of Fifth Harmony) | "Lento" | March 20, 2020 | DNC | |
| Lauren Jauregui | 2 | 3rd (As part of Fifth Harmony) | "50 ft." | April 17, 2020 | DNC | |
| Lauren Jauregui | 2 | 3rd (As part of Fifth Harmony) | "Intro" | October 8, 2021 | DNC | |
| Lauren Jauregui | 2 | 3rd (As part of Fifth Harmony) | "Colors" | October 8, 2021 | DNC | |
| Lauren Jauregui | 2 | 3rd (As part of Fifth Harmony) | "Scattered" | October 15, 2021 | DNC | |
| Lauren Jauregui | 2 | 3rd (As part of Fifth Harmony) | "On Guard" | November 3, 2021 | DNC | |
| Lauren Jauregui | 2 | 3rd (As part of Fifth Harmony) | "Piña" | September 9, 2022 | DNC | |
| Lauren Jauregui | 2 | 3rd (As part of Fifth Harmony) | "Always Love" | October 28, 2022 | DNC | |
| Lauren Jauregui | 2 | 3rd (As part of Fifth Harmony) | "Trust Issues" | March 31, 2023 | DNC | |
| Lauren Jauregui | 2 | 3rd (As part of Fifth Harmony) | "The Day the World Blows Up" | January 29, 2024 | DNC | |
| Lauren Jauregui | 2 | 3rd (As part of Fifth Harmony) | "Burning" | March 6, 2024 | DNC | |
| Lauren Jauregui | 2 | 3rd (As part of Fifth Harmony) | "Ameen" | July 26, 2024 | DNC | |
| Ally Brooke | 2 | 3rd (As part of Fifth Harmony) | "Look At Us Now" | June 9, 2017 | DNC | |
| Ally Brooke | 2 | 3rd (As part of Fifth Harmony) | "Perfect" | January 26, 2018 | DNC | |
| Ally Brooke | 2 | 3rd (As part of Fifth Harmony) | "Low Key" | January 31, 2018 | 118 | |
| Dinah Jane | 2 | 3rd (As part of Fifth Harmony) | "Boom Boom" | October 20, 2017 | DNC | |
| Dinah Jane | 2 | 3rd (As part of Fifth Harmony) | "Bottled Up" | September 21, 2018 | DNC | |
| Normani | 2 | 3rd (As part of Fifth Harmony) | "Love Lies" | February 14, 2018 | 9 | |
| Normani | 2 | 3rd (As part of Fifth Harmony) | "Dancing with a Stranger" | January 11, 2019 | 7 | |
| Normani | 2 | 3rd (As part of Fifth Harmony) | "Motivation" | August 16, 2019 | 33 | |
| Normani | 2 | 3rd (As part of Fifth Harmony) | "Wild Side" | July 16, 2021 | 14 | |
| Emblem3 | 2 | 4th | "Chloe (You're the One I Want)" | April 16, 2013 | 93 | |
| Emblem3 | 2 | 4th | "3000 Miles" | October 8, 2013 | DNC | |
| Vino Alan | 2 | 7th | "My Summer" | May 22, 2013 | DNC | |
| Bea Miller | 2 | 9th | Young Blood | June 30, 2014 | 105 | |
| Bea Miller | 2 | 9th | Fire n Gold | April 28, 2015 | 78 | |
| Bea Miller | 2 | 9th | Yes Girl | May 20, 2016 | DNC | |
| Bea Miller | 2 | 9th | "Song Like You" | February 24, 2017 | DNC | |
| Bea Miller | 2 | 9th | "S.L.U.T" | October 6, 2017 | DNC | |
| Bea Miller | 2 | 9th | I Wanna Know | March 16, 2018 | DNC | |
| LYRIC 145 | 2 | 12th | "I Get It" | February 10, 2013 | DNC | |
| David Correy | 2 | 14th (joint) | "One More Chance" | July 4, 2013 | DNC | |
| David Correy | 2 | 14th (joint) | "Show Me" | July 16, 2013 | | |
| Alex & Sierra | 3 | Winner | "Scarecrow" | September 17, 2014 | 117 | |
| Kane Brown | 3 | 4 Chair Challenge | "Used to Love You Sober" | October 3, 2015 | 82 | |
| Kane Brown | 3 | 4 Chair Challenge | "What Ifs" | February 6, 2017 | 26 | |
| Kane Brown | 3 | 4 Chair Challenge | "Heaven" | November 15, 2017 | 15 | |
| Kane Brown | 3 | 4 Chair Challenge | "Lose It" | June 25, 2018 | 28 | |
| Kane Brown | 3 | 4 Chair Challenge | "Good As You" | January 7, 2019 | 36 | |
| Kane Brown | 3 | 4 Chair Challenge | "Saturday Nights" | January 11, 2019 | 57 | |
| Kane Brown | 3 | 4 Chair Challenge | "One Thing Right" | June 19, 2019 | 32 | |
| Kane Brown | 3 | 4 Chair Challenge | "Homesick" | August 5, 2019 | 35 | |

== Albums ==
| Artist | Season | Position in show | Album title | Release date | U.S. peak chart position | Ref(s) |
|---|---|---|---|---|---|---|
| Josh Krajcik | 1 | 2nd | Josh Krajcik | November 29, 2012 | 140 | |
| Josh Krajcik | 1 | 2nd | Blindly, Lonely, Lovely | April 2, 2013 | 140 | |
| Chris Rene | 1 | 3rd | I'm Right Here | October 2, 2012 | 55 | |
| Marcus Canty | 1 | 4th | This...Is Marcus Canty | March 5, 2013 | 114 | |
| Rachel Crow | 1 | 5th | Rachel Crow | June 26, 2012 | 114 | |
| Drew Ryniewicz | 1 | 6th | Hello It's Me | December 17, 2012 | DNC | |
| LeRoy Bell | 1 | 8th | Traces | February 28, 2012 | DNC | |
| LeRoy Bell | 1 | 8th | Rock 'N Soul | February 1, 2013 | DNC | |
| Fletcher | 1 | 9th (as part of Lakota Rayne) | Girl of My Dreams | 15 | | |
| Fletcher | 1 | 9th (as part of Lakota Rayne) | In Search of the Antidot | 36 | | |
| Tate Stevens | 2 | 1st | Tate Stevens | April 23, 2013 | 18 | |
| Carly Rose Sonenclar | 2 | 2nd | Wild | September 10, 2020 | DNC | |
| Fifth Harmony | 2 | 3rd | Better Together | October 18, 2013 | 6 | |
| Fifth Harmony | 2 | 3rd | Reflection | January 30, 2015 | 5 | |
| Fifth Harmony | 2 | 3rd | 7/27 | May 27, 2016 | 4 | |
| Fifth Harmony | 2 | 3rd | Fifth Harmony | August 25, 2017 | 4 | |
| Camila Cabello | 2 | 3rd (As part of Fifth Harmony) | Camila | January 12, 2018 | 1 | |
| Camila Cabello | 2 | 3rd (As part of Fifth Harmony) | Romance | December 6, 2019 | 3 | |
| Camila Cabello | 2 | 3rd (As part of Fifth Harmony) | Familia | April 8, 2022 | 10 | |
| Camila Cabello | 2 | 3rd (As part of Fifth Harmony) | C,XOXO | June 28, 2024 | 13 | |
| Normani | 2 | 3rd (As part of Fifth Harmony) | Dopamine | June 14, 2024 | 91 | |
| Emblem3 | 2 | 4th | Nothing to Lose | July 30, 2013 | 7 | |
| Bea Miller | 2 | 9th | Young Blood (EP) | April 22, 2014 | 64 | |
| Bea Miller | 2 | 9th | Not an Apology | July 24, 2015 | 7 | |
| Alex & Sierra | 3 | 1st | It's About Us | October 7, 2014 | 8 | |
| Alex & Sierra | 3 | 1st | As Seen on TV | September 30, 2016 | 184 | |
