= Chuck Harmony production discography =

This is a list of the songwriting and production credits of Chuck Harmony.

== Writing and producing credits ==
Year	Artist	Album	Song	Credit
2007	Celine Dion	Taking Chances	"I Got Nothin' Left"	Writer, producer
2007	Mary J. Blige	Growing Pains	"Work in Progress (Growing Pains)"	Writer, producer
2008	Anastacia	Heavy Rotation	"I Can Feel You"	Writer, producer
2008	Anastacia	Heavy Rotation	"Absolutely Positively"	Writer, producer
2008	Anastacia	Heavy Rotation	"In Summer"	Producer
2008	Anastacia	Heavy Rotation	"Never Gonna Love Again"	Producer
2008	Janet Jackson	Discipline	"Let Me Know" (bonus track)	Writer, producer
2008	John Legend	Evolver	"Floating Away" (bonus track)	Writer, producer
2008	Ne-Yo	Year of the Gentleman	"Part of the List"	Writer, producer
2008	Ne-Yo	Year of the Gentleman	"Stop This World"	Writer, producer
2008	Brutha	Brutha	"Bang Bang"	Writer, producer
2009	Ne-Yo	The Princess and the Frog: Original Songs and Score	"Never Knew I Needed"	Producer
2009	Sun Ho	Fancy Free	"Fancy Free"	Producer
2009	J. Holiday	Round 2	"Don't Go"	Writer, producer
2009	Mary J. Blige	I Can Do Bad All by Myself	"I Can Do Bad"	Writer, producer
2009	Rihanna	Rated R	"Russian Roulette"	Writer, producer
2009	Chrisette Michele	Epiphany	"Epiphany"	Writer, producer
2009	Chrisette Michele	Epiphany	"Notebook"	Writer, producer
2009	Chrisette Michele	Epiphany	"What You Do"	Writer, producer
2009	Chrisette Michele	Epiphany	"Blame It on Me"	Writer, producer
2009	Chrisette Michele	Epiphany	"Another One"	Writer, producer
2009	Chrisette Michele	Epiphany	"Fragile"	Writer, producer
2009	Chrisette Michele	Epiphany	"Mr. Right"	Writer, producer
2009	Chrisette Michele	Epiphany	"Porcelain Doll"	Writer, producer
2009	Chrisette Michele	Epiphany	"I'm Okay"	Writer, producer
2010	Kelly Rowland		"Shake Them Haters Off"	Producer
2010	Jennifer Hudson	I Remember Me	"Why Is It So Hard"	Writer, producer
2010	Keri Hilson	No Boys Allowed	"Pretty Girl Rock"	Writer, producer
2010	Jessica Mauboy	Get 'Em Girls	"Scariest Part"	Writer, producer
2010	Ne-Yo	Libra Scale	"One in a Million"	Writer, producer
2010	Jazmine Sullivan	Love Me Back	"Good Enough"	Writer, producer
2010	Fantasia	Back To Me	"I'm Doin' Me"	Writer, producer
2010	Fantasia	Back To Me	"Bittersweet"	Writer, producer
2010	Toni Braxton	Pulse	"Pulse"	Writer, producer
2010	Jaheim	Another Round	"Bed Is Listening"	Writer, producer
2010	Chrisette Michele	Let Freedom Reign	"Fairy Tales and Castles (Part 1)"	Writer, producer
2010	Chrisette Michele	Let Freedom Reign	"I’m a Star"	Writer, producer
2010	Chrisette Michele	Let Freedom Reign	"Number One"	Writer, producer
2010	Chrisette Michele	Let Freedom Reign	"Fairy Tales and Castles (Part 2)"	Writer, producer
2010	Chrisette Michele	Let Freedom Reign	"Let Freedom Reign"	Writer, producer
2010	Chrisette Michele	Let Freedom Reign	"Goodbye Game"	Writer, producer
2010	Chrisette Michele	Let Freedom Reign	"So Cool"	Writer, producer
2010	Chrisette Michele	Let Freedom Reign	"So in Love" (feat. Rick Ross)	Writer, producer
2010	Chrisette Michele	Let Freedom Reign	"I'm Your Life"	Writer, producer
2010	Chrisette Michele	Let Freedom Reign	"Unsaid"	Writer, producer
2010	Chrisette Michele	Let Freedom Reign	"If Nobody Sang Along"	Writer, producer
2010	Chrisette Michele	Let Freedom Reign	"I Know Nothing"	Writer, producer
2010	Jenna Andrews		"Wash My Hands"	Writer, producer
2010	Jenna Andrews		"It Is What It Is"	Writer, producer
2010	Jenna Andrews		"Moon and the Stars"	Writer, producer
2010	Jenna Andrews		"Neurotic"	Writer, producer
2010	Jenna Andrews		"Who Am I"	Writer, producer
2011	Ledisi	Pieces of Me	"Pieces of Me"	Writer, producer
2012	Ne-Yo	R.E.D.	"To Whom It May Concern" (bonus track)	Writer, producer
2012	Chris Rene	I'm Right Here	"Rockin' with You"	Writer, producer
2012	Tamia	Beautiful Surprise	"It's Not Fair"	Producer
2012	Q Parker	The MANual	"60 Seconds"	Writer, producer
2013	Marcus Canty	This...Is Marcus Canty	"Tonight"	Writer, producer
2013	Chrisette Michele	Better	"Better"	Writer, producer
2013	Chrisette Michele	Better	"Get Through the Night"	Writer, producer
2013	98 Degrees	2.0	"Lonely"	Writer, producer
2013	Jessie J	Alive	"I Miss Her"	Writer, producer
2014	Ledisi	The Truth	"I Blame You"	Writer, producer
2014	Johnny Gill	Game Changer	"Behind Closed Doors"	Writer, producer
2014	Johnny Gill	Game Changer	"5000 Miles"	Writer, producer
2014	Johnny Gill	Game Changer	"You Choose Me"	Writer, producer
2015	Tori Kelly	Unbreakable Smile	"Funny"	Writer
2015	Tori Kelly	Unbreakable Smile	"Anyway"	Writer, producer
2015	Jazmine Sullivan	Reality Show	"#HoodLove"	Writer, producer
2015	Jazmine Sullivan	Reality Show	"Forever Don't Last"	Writer, producer
2015	Masha		"Mr. Presley"	Writer
2015	Tamia	Love Life	"Lipstick"	Writer, producer
2015	Jussie Smollett	Empire: Original Soundtrack Season 2 Volume 1	"Never Lose Again"	Writer
2016	Corinne Bailey Rae	The Heart Speaks in Whispers	"High" (bonus track)	Writer
