= Claude Kelly production discography =

This is a list of Claude Kelly's songwriting and production credits.

== Songwriting ==
=== Discography ===
Year	Artist	Album	Song	Co-written with
2006	Frankie J	Priceless	"Daddy's Little Girl"	Frankie J, David Sánchez, Nathan Perez, Steve Valdez
2006	Frankie J	Priceless	"Say Something"	Frankie J, DJ Clue?
2007	Kat DeLuna	9 Lives	"In The End"	Kat DeLuna, RedOne
2007	Kat DeLuna	9 Lives	"Love Me, Leave Me"	Kat DeLuna, RedOne, Maher Zain
2007	Kat DeLuna	9 Lives	"Love Confusion"	Kat DeLuna, RedOne
2008	Brandy	Human	"Camouflage"	Rodney "Darkchild" Jerkins
2008	Brandy	Human	"True"	RedOne
2008	Lemar	The Reason	"If She Knew"	Lemar Obika, Tariq Belrouge
2008	Leona Lewis	Spirit	"Forgive Me"	Aliuane "Akon" Thiam, Giorgio Tuinfort
2008	Jesse McCartney	Departure	"Told You So"	Jesse McCartney, Eric Hudson, Frankie Storm
2008	Jesse McCartney	Departure	"Not Your Enemy"	Jesse McCartney, Eric Hudson, Frankie Storm
2008	Jesse McCartney	Departure	"Oxygen"	Jesse McCartney, Eric Hudson, Frankie Storm
2008	Britney Spears	Circus	"Circus"	Lukasz Gottwald, Benjamin Levin
2008	Britney Spears	Circus	"Shattered Glass"	Lukasz Gottwald, Benjamin Levin
2009	Akon	Freedom	"We Don't Care"	Akon, Giorgio Tuinfort
2009	Akon	Freedom	"Over the Edge"	Akon, Giorgio Tuinfort
2009	Backstreet Boys	This Is Us	"If I Knew Then"	Kenneth Karlin, Carsten Schack
2009	Backstreet Boys	This Is Us	"Bye, Bye Love"	Kenneth Karlin, Carsten Schack
2009	Corbin Bleu	Speed of Light	"Speed of Light"	Brian Kennedy
2009	Corbin Bleu	Speed of Light	"Paralyzed"	Brian Kennedy
2009	Corbin Bleu	Speed of Light	"Moments That Matter"	Corbin Bleu, Eric Hudson
2009	Corbin Bleu	Speed of Light	"Fear of Flying"	Brian Kennedy
2009	Corbin Bleu	Speed of Light	"Champion"	Bleu, Eric Hudson
2009	Corbin Bleu	Speed of Light	"Rock 2 It"	Brian Kennedy, Mansa Wakili
2009	Corbin Bleu	Speed of Light	"Whatever It Takes"	Eric Hudson
2009	Corbin Bleu	Speed of Light	"My Everything"	Brian Kennedy
2009	Corbin Bleu	Speed of Light	"Angel Cry"	Eric Hudson
2009	Corbin Bleu	Speed of Light	"Close"	Eric Hudson
2009	Toni Braxton		"I Hate Love"	Tor Erik Hermansen, Mikkel Eriksen
2009	Kelly Clarkson	All I Ever Wanted	"My Life Would Suck Without You"	Max Martin, Luke Gottwald
2009	Kelly Clarkson	All I Ever Wanted	"Don't Let Me Stop You"	Andreas Romdhane, Josef Larossi
2009	Miley Cyrus	The Times of Our Lives	"Party in the U.S.A."	Jessica Cornish, Lukasz Gottwald
2009	Miley Cyrus	The Times of Our Lives	"The Time Of Our Lives"	Lukasz Gottwald, Kesha, Pebe Sebert
2009	Jason Derülo	Jason Derülo	"In My Head"	Jason Derülo, J.R. Rotem
2009	Jason Derülo	Jason Derülo	"Love Hangover"	Jason Derülo, J.R. Rotem
2009	Jason Derülo	Jason Derülo	"Queen of Hearts"	Jason Derülo, J.R. Rotem
2009	Marié Digby	Breathing Underwater	"Symphony"	Marié Digby, Antwoine Collins
2009	E.M.D	A State of Mind	"Alone"	Andreas Romdhane, Josef Larossi
2009	Melanie Fiona	The Bridge	"Priceless"	Raymond Angry, Daniel Wilensky
2009	Whitney Houston	I Look to You	"Like I Never Left" feat. Akon	Whitney Houston, Akon, Giorgio Tuinfort
2009	Whitney Houston	I Look to You	"For the Lovers"	Nathaniel Hills, Marcella Araica
2009	Whitney Houston	I Look to You	"I Got You"	Whitney Houston, Akon, Giorgio Tuinfort
2009	R. Kelly	Untitled	"Echo"	Infinity, Darhyl Camper, Jr., R. Kelly
2009	R. Kelly	Untitled	"Like I Do"	R. Kelly, Carlos McKinney
2009	Adam Lambert	For Your Entertainment	"For Your Entertainment"	Luke Gottwald
2009	Chrisette Michele	Epiphany	"Notebook"	Chuck Harmony, Shaffer Smith
2009	Chrisette Michele	Epiphany	"Blame It on Me"	Chrisette Michele, Chuck Harmony
2009	Chrisette Michele	Epiphany	"Mr Right"	Chrisette Michele, Chuck Harmony
2009	Chrisette Michele	Epiphany	"Playin' Our Song"	Rodney "Darkchild" Jerkins
2009	Chrisette Michele	Epiphany	"Fragile (feat. Wale)	Chrisette Michele, Chuck Harmony
2009	Jay Sean	My Own Way: Deluxe Edition	"Tonight"	Jay Sean, J-Remy, Bobby Bass, & J Perkins
2009	Jordin Sparks	Battlefield	"The Cure"	Jordin Sparks, Carlos McKinney
2009	Linda Teodosiu	Under Pressure	"Love Sux"	Andreas Romdhane, Josef Larossi
2010	Christina Aguilera	Bionic	"Woohoo" feat. Nicki Minaj	Christina Aguilera, Jamal Jones, Ester Dean, Nicki Minaj
2010	Christina Aguilera	Bionic	"Desnudate"	Christina Aguilera, Christopher "Tricky" Stewart
2010	Christina Aguilera	Bionic	"Love & Glamour (Intro)"	Christina Aguilera, Christopher "Tricky" Stewart
2010	Christina Aguilera	Bionic	"Glam"	Christina Aguilera, Christopher "Tricky" Stewart
2010	Christina Aguilera	Bionic	"Prima Donna"	Christina Aguilera, Christopher "Tricky" Stewart
2010	Christina Aguilera	Bionic	"Vanity"	Christina Aguilera, Ester Dean
2010	Christina Aguilera	Burlesque	"Express"	Christina Aguilera, Christopher "Tricky" Stewart
2010	Christina Aguilera	Burlesque	"Show Me How You Burlesque"	Christina Aguilera, Christopher "Tricky" Stewart
2010	David Archuleta	The Other Side of Down	"Falling Stars"	Emanuel Kiriakou, Jess Cates
2010	David Archuleta	The Other Side of Down	"Complain"	Emanuel Kirakou, David Hodges
2010	Fantasia	Back to Me	"Bittersweet"	Chuck Harmony
2010	Fantasia	Back to Me	"I'm Doin' Me"	Chuck Harmony
2010	Fantasia	Back to Me	"The Worst Part Is Over"	Warren Fleder
2010	Charice	Charice	"In This Song"	David Foster, Emanuel Kirakou
2010	Miranda Cosgrove	Sparks Fly	"Kissin' U"	Miranda Cosgrove, Luke Gottwald
2010	Miley Cyrus	Can't Be Tamed	"Permanent December"	Miley Cyrus, John Shanks
2010	Lee DeWyze	Live It Up	"It's Gotta Be Love"	Lee DeWyze, Espen Lind, Amund Bjørklund
2010	Lee DeWyze	Live It Up	"Stay Here"	Lee DeWyze, Espen Lind, Amund Bjørklund
2010	Fefe Dobson	Joy	"Stuttering"	Fefe Dobson, J.R. Rotem
2010	Flo Rida	Only One Flo (Part 1)	"Who Dat Girl" feat. Akon	Flo Rida, Lukasz Gottwald, Bruno Mars, Benjamin Levin, Philip Lawrence
2010	Michael Jackson	Michael	"Hold My Hand" feat. Akon	Aliaune Thiam, Giorgio Tuinfort
2010	Lil Jon	Crunk Rock	"What a Night"	Justin Bates, Lil Jon, Steve Aoki
2010	Lil Jon	Crunk Rock	"Ms. Chocolate"	Drumma Boy, R. Kelly, Lil Jon
2010	Kesha	Animal	"Take It Off"	Kesha, Lukasz Gottwald
2010	Bruno Mars	Doo-Wops & Hooligans	"Grenade"	Bruno Mars, Philip Lawrence, Ari Levine, Brody Brown, Andrew Wyatt
2010	Jessica Mauboy	Get 'Em Girls	"Maze"	Jessica Mauboy
2010	Olly Murs	Olly Murs	"Please Don't Let Me Go"	Olly Murs, Steve Robson
2010	Sugababes	Sweet 7	"Little Miss Perfect"	Tor Erik Hermansen, Mikkel Eriksen
2011	David Cook	This Loud Morning	"4 Letter Word"	David Cook, Matt Squire
2011	Jason Derülo	Future History	"Be Careful"	Jason Derülo, J.R. Rotem
2011	Jason Derülo	Future History	"Bombs Away"	Jason Derulo, Jai Marlon
2011	Glee		"As Long As You're There" feat. Charice	Adam Anders, Par Astrom
2011	Hot Chelle Rae	Whatever	"Honestly"	Ryan Follese, Nash Overstreet, Ian Keaggy, Sam Hollander, Dave Katz
2011	Jessie J	Who You Are	"Price Tag" feat. B.o.B.	Jessica Cornish, Lukasz Gottwald, Bobby Ray Simmons
2011	Jessie J	Who You Are	"Nobody's Perfect"	Jessica Cornish
2011	Jessie J	Who You Are	"Abracadabra"	Jessica Cornish, Lukasz Gottwald
2011	Jessie J	Who You Are	"Domino"	Jessica Cornish, Lukasz Gottwald, Max Martin, Henry Walter
2011	Joe Jonas	Fastlife	"Make You Mine"	Joe Jonas, Nathaniel Hills, Marcella Araica
2011	Ledisi	Pieces of Me	"Pieces of Me"	Ledisi Young, Chuck Harmony
2011	Ledisi	Pieces of Me	"Bravo"	John Webb, Julia Miranda, Joshua Webb
2011	Ledisi	Pieces of Me	"Shine"	Ledisi Young, John Webb
2011	Jennifer Lopez	Love?	"Hypnotico"	RedOne, Lady Gaga, Aliaune Thiam, Tami Chynn
2011	Martina McBride	Eleven	"One Night"	Martina McBride, Tommy Lee James
2011	James Morrison	The Awakening	"Right By Your Side"	James Morrison, Steve Robson
2011	Matthew Morrison	Matthew Morrison	"Summer Rain"	Matthew Morrison, Espen Lind, Amund Bjørklund
2011	Olly Murs	In Case You Didn't Know	"Dance with Me Tonight"	Olly Murs, Steve Robson
2011	Olly Murs	In Case You Didn't Know	"In Case You Didn't Know"	Olly Murs, Steve Robson
2011	Olly Murs	In Case You Didn't Know	"This Song Is About You"	Olly Murs, Steve Robson
2011	Musiq Soulchild	MusiqInTheMagiq	"Yes"	Ceon, Kim Ofstad
2011	NKOTBSB	NKOTBSB	"Don't Turn Out the Lights"	Jess Cates
2011	Pitbull	Planet Pit	"International Love" feat. Chris Brown	Armando Pérez, Carsten Schack, Peter Biker, Sean Hurley
2011	Simple Plan	Get Your Heart On!	"Loser of the Year"	Pierre Bouvier, Chuck Comeau
2011	Britney Spears	Femme Fatale	"Gasoline"	Lukasz Gottwald, Benjamin Levin, Bonnie McKee, Emily Wright
The Wanted	Battleground	"Gold Forever"	Steve Mac, Wayne Hector	
2012	Christina Aguilera	Lotus	"Just a Fool" feat. Blake Shelton	Steve Robson, Wayne Hector
2012	Faith Evans	R&B Divas	"Tears of Joy"	Chuck Harmony
2012	Goapele	Sparkle: Music from the Motion Picture	"Running"	Chuck Harmony
2012	Neon Hitch		"Gold" feat. Tyga	Neon Hitch, Benjamin Levine, Philip Lawrence, Bruno Mars
2012	Karmin	Hello	"Brokenhearted"	Amy Heidemann, Nick Noonan, Emily Wright, John Hill, Henry Walter, Elite
2012	Karmin	Hello	"Hello"	Amy Heidemann, Nick Noonan, Mikkel Eriksen, Tor Erik Hermansen. A. Rowe
2012	Karmin	Hello	"Walking on the Moon"	Amy Heidemann, Nick Noonan, John Webb Jr.
2012	Adam Lambert	Trespassing	"Better Than I Know Myself"	Lukasz Gottwald, Joshua Coleman
2012	Olly Murs	Right Place Right Time	"Troublemaker" feat. Flo Rida	Olly Murs, Steve Robson, Tramar Dillard
2012	Olly Murs	Right Place Right Time	"Right Place Right Time"	Olly Murs, Steve Robson
2012	Olly Murs	Right Place Right Time	"Head to Toe"	Olly Murs, Chuck Harmony
2012	Olly Murs	Right Place Right Time	"Hey You Beautiful"	Olly Murs, Steve Robson
2012	Olly Murs	Right Place Right Time	"Loud & Clear"	Olly Murs, Chuck Harmony
2012	Chris Rene	I'm Right Here	"Rockin' With You"	Chris Rene, Gabriel Rene, Gina Rene, Chuck Harmony
2012	Chris Rene	I'm Right Here	"Love Me Like You"	Chris Rene, Carsten Schack, Peter Biker, Gabriel Rene
2012	Jay Sean		"Open All Night" feat. Lil Jon	
2012	Tamia	Beautiful Surprise	"Beautiful Surprise"	Tamia Hill, Salaam Remi
2012	Tamia	Beautiful Surprise	"Give Me You"	
2012	Tamia	Beautiful Surprise	"Lose My Mind"	Tamia Hill
2012	Tamia	Beautiful Surprise	"Believe in Love"	Tamia Hill
2012	Tamia	Beautiful Surprise	"It's Not Fair"	
2012	Tamia	Beautiful Surprise	"Him"	Tamia Hill
2013	Big Time Rush	24/Seven	"Like Nobody's Around"	Jason Evigan, Mitch Allan, Emily Wright, Austin Bis
2013	Daughtry	Baptized	"Baptized"	Chris Daughtry
2013	Daughtry	Baptized	"Broken Arrows"	Chris Daughtry
2013	Daughtry	Baptized	"Witness"	Chris Daughtry
2013	Eve	Lip Lock	"Make It Out This Town"	Eve Jeffers, Nicholas Oshane Moore, Jon Webb
2013	Jessie J	Alive	"It's My Party"	Jessica Cornish, John Larderi & Colin Norman
2013	Jessie J	Alive	"Thunder"	Jessica Cornish, Tor Erik Hermansen, Mikkel Eriksen, Benjamin Levin
2013	Jessie J	Alive	"Sexy Lady"	Jessica Cornish, Joshua Coleman
2013	Jessie J	Alive	"I Miss Her"	Jessica Cornish, Charles T. Harmony
2013	Jessie J	Alive	"Daydreamin'"	Jessica Cornish, Josh Abraham, Oliver Goldstein
2013	Jessie J	Alive	"Wild"	Jessica Cornish, Joshua Coleman, Dylan Mills, Sean Anderson
2013	Jessie J	Alive	"Gold"	Jessica Cornish, Henry Walter, Lukasz Gottwald
2013	Jessie J	Alive	"Conquer the World" (feat. Brandy)	Jessica Cornish, John Webb, Anders Froen, J. DeBardlabon, Are Sorknes
2013	Jessie J	Alive	"Alive"	Jessica Cornish, Rodney "Darkchild" Jerkins
2013	One Direction	Midnight Memories	"Why Don't We Go There"	Louis Tomlinson, Wayne Hector, Steve Robson
2013	Union J	Union J (album)	"Carry You"	Steve Mac
2014	Alex & Sierra	It's About Us	"Bumper Cars"	Steve Mac
2014	DJ Cassidy feat. Jessie J & Robin Thicke		"Calling All Hearts"	Jessica Cornish, Robin Thicke, Cassidy Podell, Gregory Cohen
2014	Tessanne Chin	Count on My Love	"Always Tomorrow"	
2014	Johnny Gill	Game Changer	"You Choose Me"	Jaramye Daniels, Charles Harmon
2014	Ella Henderson	Chapter One	"Rockets"	Ella Henderson, Steve Robson
2014	Karmin	Pulses	"Geronimo Intro"	Amy Heidemann, Nick Noonan, James G. Morales, Matt Morales
2014	Karmin	Pulses	"Night Like This"	Any Heidemann, Nick Noonan, Emily Wright, Kyle Shearer
2014	Ledisi	The Truth	"I Blame You"	
2014	Ledisi	The Truth	"That Good Good"	
2014	Ledisi	The Truth	"Anything"	
2014	Kylie Minogue	Kiss Me Once	"Sleeping with the Enemy"	Greg Kurstin
2014	Olly Murs	Never Been Better	"Wrapped Up"	Olly Murs, Travie McCoy, Steve Robson
2014	Olly Murs	Never Been Better	"Can't Say No"	Olly Murs, Steve Robson
2014	Olly Murs	Never Been Better	"History"	Olly Murs, Steve Robson
2014	Amber Riley		"Colorblind"	Emeli Sandé
2015	Stacy Barthe	BEcoming	"Me Versus Me"	Stacy Barthe, Darhyl Camper Jr.
2015	Tamar Braxton	Calling All Lovers	"Raise the Bar"	Tamar Braxton, Darhyl Camper Jr.
2015	Estelle	True Romance	"Conqueror"	Estelle Swaray, Angel Higgs, Jaramye Daniels, Akil C. King, Kyle Henry, Bailey Owens
2015	Tori Kelly	Unbreakable Smile	"Where I Belong"	Tori Kelly
2015	Tori Kelly	Unbreakable Smile	"Funny"	Tori Kelly, Chuck Harmony
2015	Tori Kelly	Unbreakable Smile	"Anyway"	Tori Kelly, Chuck Harmony
2015	Masha		"Mr. Presley"	Chuck Harmony, Masha
2015	Tamia	Love Life	"Lipstick"	Jaramye Daniels, Charles Harmon
2015	Tamia	Love Life	"No Lie"	Tamia Hill, Ray McCullogh, Jeremy Reeves, Ray Romulus, Jonathan Yip
2015	Tamia	Love Life	"Day One"	Tamia Hill, John Lardieri
2015	The Vamps	Wake Up	"I Found a Girl"	James Blunt, Ross Golan, Steve Mac, Ammar Malik, The Vamps
