= Chris Rene discography =

- Studio albums: 1
- Singles: 2
- Music videos: 2
- Miscellaneous: 1

The discography of American recording artist Chris Rene consists of one independent album, two singles and two music videos.

== Albums ==
=== Studio albums ===
Title	Details	Peak chart positions	
Title	Details	US	NZ
I'm Right Here	Release: October 2, 2012; Label: Syco, Sony BMG; Formats: CD, digital download	55	8

=== Independent albums ===
List of albums
Title	Album details	Notes
Soul'd Out	Released: July 21, 2009; Format: CD, digital download	

== Singles ==
Year	Title	Peak chart positions				Certifications	Album
Year	Title	US	NZ	CAN	IRE	Certifications	Album
2012	"Young Homie"	101	1	72	64	RIANZ: Platinum; U.S.: 293,000	I'm Right Here
2012	"Trouble"	—	10	—	—	RIANZ: Gold; U.S.: 51,000	I'm Right Here
2012	"Rockin' With You"	—	26	—	—		I'm Right Here

== Other songs ==
Title
"Where Do We Go from Here"
"The Same Blood"
"So Confused"

=== As featured artist ===
- "Ain't Goin' Nowhere" - Rich Tycoon (ft. Chris Rene)
- "Crazy" / "It's ok" / "Just for Tonight" - Mac Jar monikape (ft. Chris Rene)
- "Dis Shit Knockz" - Fury Figeroa (ft. Ross Rock, Chris Rene & Jesse James)
- "Fastlane" / RIP Aziz - Hungry & Hated (ft. Chris Rene)
- "Half of What You Got" - Playz (ft. Giant & Chris Rene)
- "In 2 Deep" - Famouz (ft. Chris Rene & Cait La Dee)
- "The Calm Before the Storm" - Sincere (ft. Chris Rene)
- "Who U B?" - Fury Figeroa (ft. Chris Rene)
- "Is It So" - Sincere (ft.Chris Rene)
- "Worl O Luv" - Super Tough/ Dance Worm (ft. Chris Rene & Rankin' Scroo)
- " Hollywood Lyfe" Dylan Synclaire (ft. Chris Rene)

== Music videos ==
Title	Year	Artist	Director
"Young Homie"	2012	Chris Rene	Jeremy Rall
"Trouble"	2012	Chris Rene	Honey
