= In & Out (Marcus Canty song) =

Single by Marcus Canty featuring Wale

from the album This...Is Marcus Canty
- Released: July 31, 2012
- Recorded: 2012
- Genre: R&B, Hip hop
- Length: 4:05
- Label: Epic
- Songwriter(s): Cleveland Browne, Courtney Harrell, Eric Bellinger, Grevine Gordon, Harmony David Samuels, Olubowale Akintimehin, Rexton Gordon & Wycliffe Johnson
- Producer(s): Harmony Samuels

Marcus Canty singles chronology
"Won't Make a Fool Out of You" (2012)	"In & Out" (2012)	"Used By You" (2012)

Wale singles chronology
"I'm On" (2011)	"In & Out" (2012)	"Diced Pineapples" (2012)

"In & Out" is the debut single by American R&B singer Marcus Canty, featuring rapper Wale. It is a hip hop, and R&B song.

== Background ==
After signing a record deal with Epic Records, Marcus released a single called "Won't Make a Fool Out of You," which was featured in the movie Think Like a Man. He later collaborated with rapper Wale on his second official single. The song was produced by Harmony Samuels. Marcus revealed that he hoped Wale would collaborate on the single stating "you know his buzz and his skills, and his ability on my record would take it to the next level and bring more fans that I may wouldn't have reached if he wasn't on the record too."

== Promotion ==
On August 23, 2012, Marcus joined LA Reid on Access Hollywood to promote the single and the upcoming music video.

== Reception ==
=== Critical reception ===
The song has received positive reviews from critics. Amy Sciarretto of Pop Crush gave the song a positive review, though started off with how the "dark song gallops with beats and the singer's dreamy voice is not as evident here. That's not a bad thing, though." She complimented how Marcus is "branching out and trying something edgy." Lyndsey Parker of Yahoo! Canada gave the song a positive review, saying "the high-energy jam, which features a rap by the very credible, sounds shockingly current, badass and funky-fresh."

== Music video ==
The music video was filmed in Brooklyn, New York on August 13, 2012. The music video premiered on BET's 106 & Park on August 31, 2012 and was directed by Erik White. The music video features Marcus Canty hanging around 3 girls at a party.

== Release history ==
Region	Date	Format
United States	July 31, 2012	Digital download
