= Trouble (Chris Rene song) =

Single by Chris Rene

from the album I'm Right Here
- Released: June 26, 2012
- Recorded: 2012
- Genre: Pop, reggae fusion, soul
- Length: 3:05
- Label: Epic
- Songwriter(s): Alex Lambert, busbee, Jason Bonilla
- Producer(s): busbee, J Bonilla

Chris Rene singles chronology
"Young Homie" (2012)	"Trouble" (2012)	"Rockin' with You" (2012)

Music video
- "Trouble" on YouTube

"Trouble" is a song by Epic Records recording artist Chris Rene his debut EP, I'm Right Here. It was written by American Idol semi-finalist Alex Lambert, Busbee, and J Bonilla, and produced by busbee and J Bonilla. The song will serve as his second single of his debut album. The song was released for digital download on June 26, 2012.

== Background and recording ==
The song was originally a collaboration between American Idol semi-finalist Alex Lambert and songwriter/producer busbee. The demo was shopped around and bought by Epic Records and Rene to record for his debut studio album. A lyric video of the song was released on YouTube and Vevo on June 20, 2012.

== Live performances ==
Rene debuted his single live at Q92 radio station in Ohio, then again at B104 Night at the Mayfair Festival of the Arts June 7

== Chart performance ==
"Trouble" had made its second appearance on the New Zealand Singles Chart, debuting at number ten, making it his second top ten single consecutively. "Trouble" debuted on the AOL Top 40 pop songs chart at #26. The song also debuted at number one hundred on the US Hot 100 Airplay chart.

== Release history ==
Country	Date	Format	Label
United States	June 26, 2012	Mainstream radio, digital download	Epic
