= The X Factor (American TV series) season 1 =

The X Factor
- Season 1
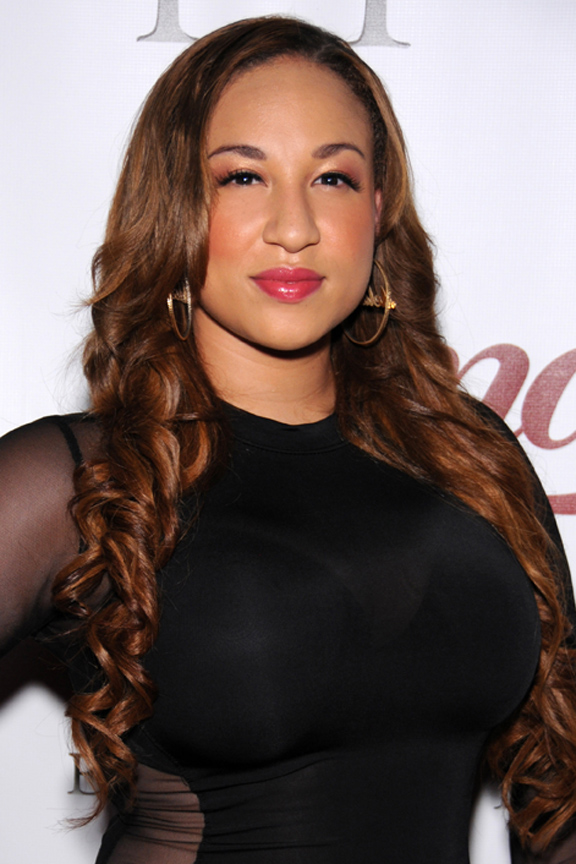
- Season 1 Winner: Melanie Amaro
- Hosted by: Steve Jones; Nicole Scherzinger (Los Angeles & Chicago auditions)
- Judges: Paula Abdul; Simon Cowell; Nicole Scherzinger; L.A. Reid; Cheryl Cole (Los Angeles & Chicago auditions)
- Winner: Melanie Amaro
- Winning mentor: Simon Cowell
- Runner-up: Josh Krajcik

Release
- Original network: Fox
- Original release: September 21 – December 22, 2011

Season chronology
- Next → Season 2

The first season of the American version of the music competition show The X Factor began airing on Fox on September 21, 2011.

Based on the British format, the competition consists of auditions, in front of producers and then the judges with a live audience; boot camp; judges' houses and then the live finals. Auditions for the show began in March 2011 and concluded in June 2011. The show was hosted by Welsh TV presenter Steve Jones, while the original judging panel consisted of Cowell, Cheryl Cole, Paula Abdul and L.A. Reid. Cole later departed from the show after just two audition rounds and was replaced by Nicole Scherzinger, who originally co-hosted with Jones.

An early preview of The X Factor aired during the 2011 Major League Baseball All-Star Game on July 12, 2011. Another preview was shown following NFL on Fox on September 11. The show was simultaneously broadcast in Canada on CTV or CTV Two, depending on schedule.

Season one's finale aired on December 22, 2011, resulting in Melanie Amaro as the winner, and Simon Cowell as the winning mentor.

== Judges and hosts ==
Judges and Host for The X Factor Season 1

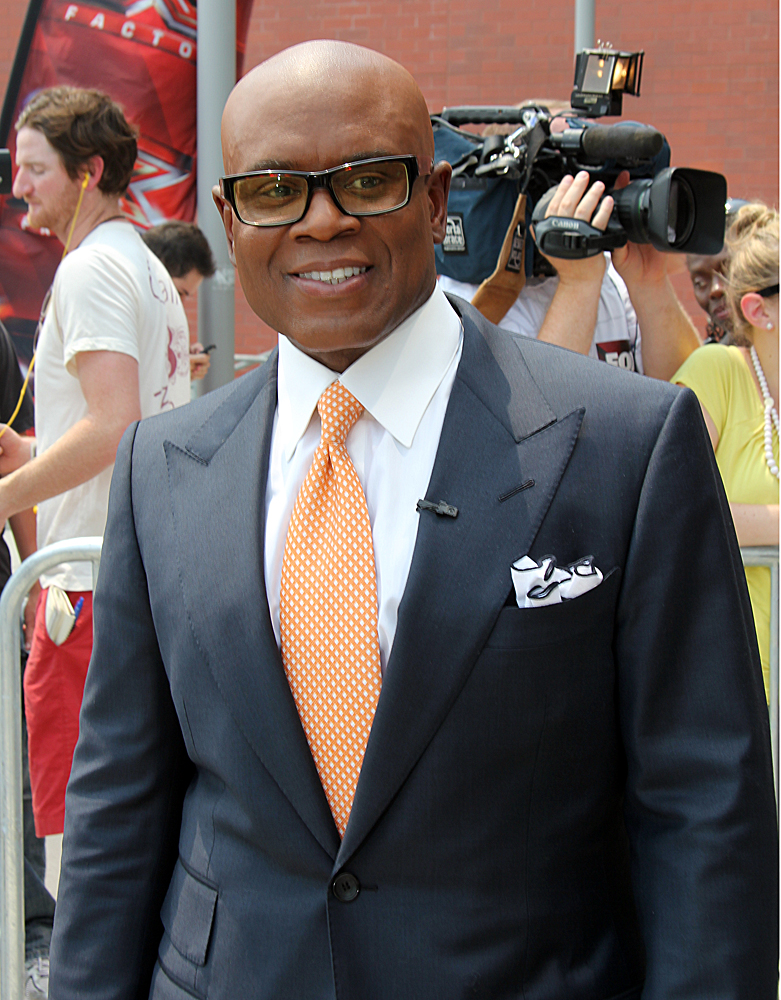
L.A. Reid

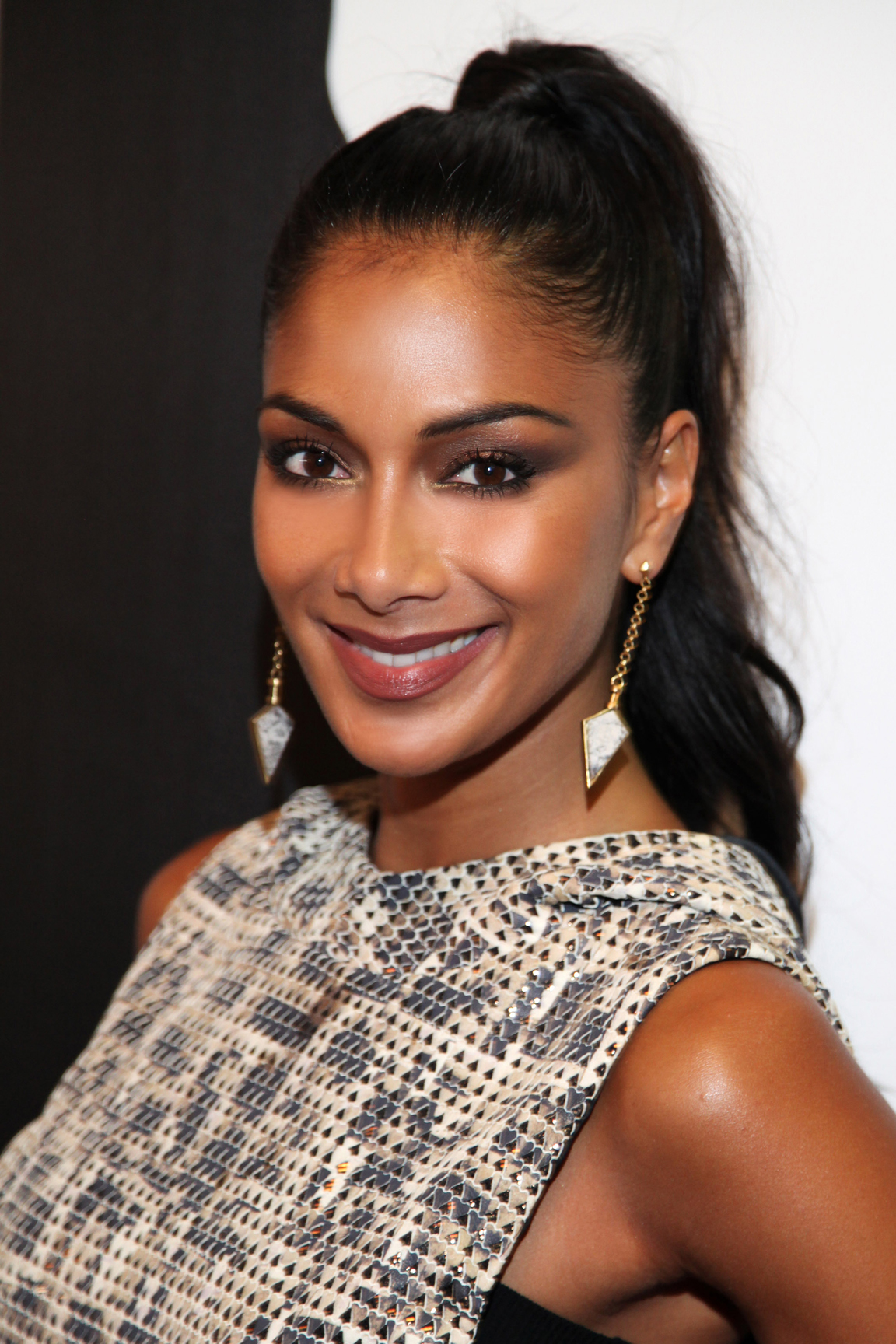
Nicole Scherzinger

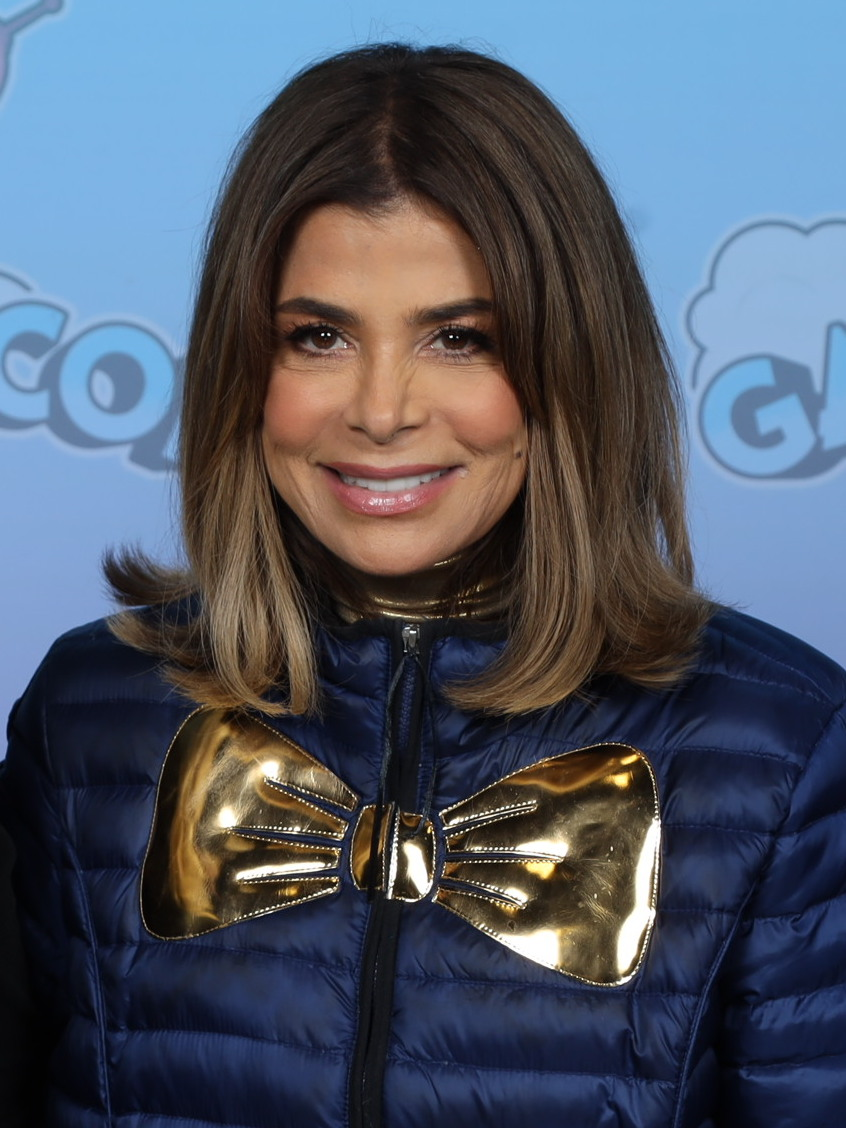
Paula Abdul

Simon Cowell

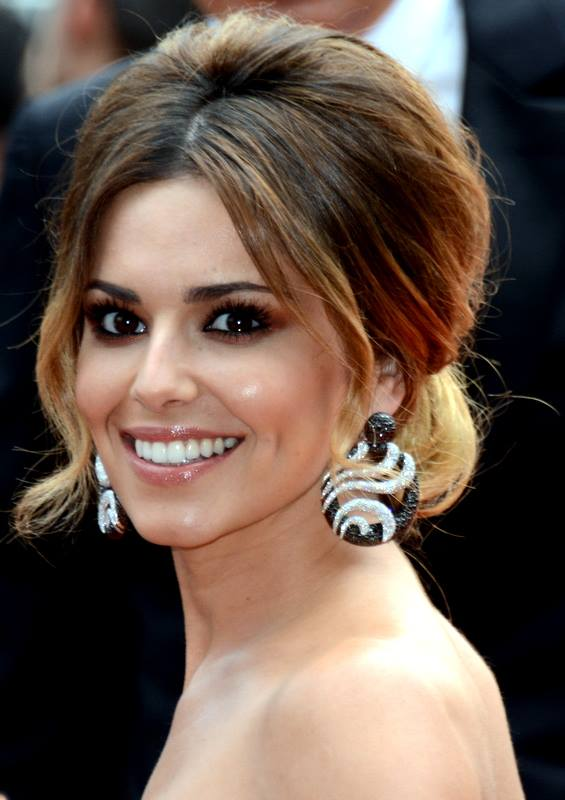
Cheryl Cole (Chicago and Los Angeles auditions)

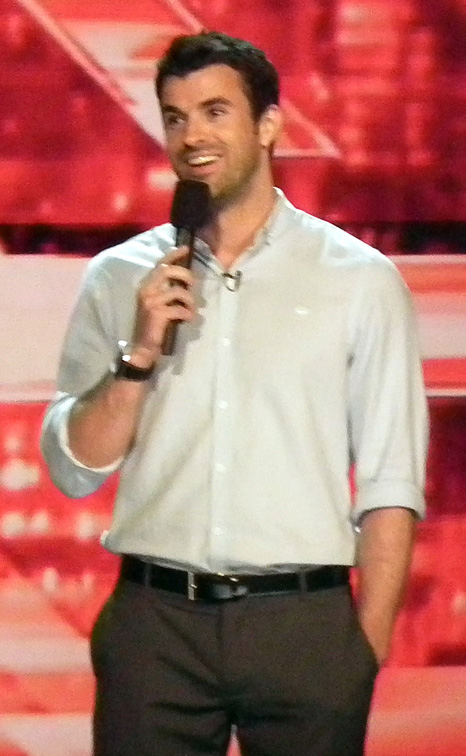
Steve Jones

At the time of announcing the USA show of The X Factor, Cowell was the only confirmed judge. Eventually, Grammy Award-winning record executive, songwriter, and record producer L.A. Reid, The X Factor UK judge Cheryl Cole, and Cowell's former American Idol colleague Paula Abdul Numerous people were speculated to host the series, including High School Musical star Corbin Bleu and The X Factor UK host Dermot O'Leary. On May 8, 2011, Nicole Scherzinger and Welsh presenter Steve Jones were announced as co-hosts of the show.

On May 26, 2011, it was reported that Cole had been dropped from the show and was set to be replaced by Scherzinger. Reports varied over whether she was dropped because American audiences had difficulty understanding her accent, because of a lack of chemistry between her and Abdul, because Cole is unknown to American audiences, because Cole was confused with Sheryl Crow by American audiences, or that she had stepped down herself due to homesickness. Cole's departure was officially confirmed on June 6 in a statement from Fox, which also confirmed Scherzinger as her replacement. Jones would then serve as the sole presenter. On August 5, 2011, Cowell announced that the reason why Cole left was because he gave her the option to be a judge on the 2011 series of the UK show as he felt that she would have been comfortable there. He said that if her departure had anything to do with her not getting along with Abdul then he would not be judging the show. Cole later revealed in a 2012 interview that she had decided to quit the USA show on her own merit and rejected Cowell's offer to return to the UK show after Tulisa already replaced her on the 2011 UK show panel and her unwillingness to be a permanent judge the UK show without Cowell. The other two reasons Cole departed the USA show was due to American audiences having difficulty understanding her accent and Cole being unknown in the United States. Cole later alleviated with Cowell in 2014 and she along with Cowell would both return as judges on the UK show for the 2014 UK series.

== Selection process ==
=== Auditions ===
Cities where the auditions were held.

Auditions for producers began in Los Angeles, California, on March 27, 2011, at the Los Angeles Memorial Sports Arena. They then took place in Miami, Florida, on April 7, 2011, at the BankUnited Center and continued in Newark, New Jersey's Prudential Center on April 14, 2011. More auditions took place in Seattle, Washington's KeyArena on April 20, 2011, and Chicago, Illinois's Sears Centre on April 27, 2011, and finished in Dallas, Texas's American Airlines Center on May 26, 2011.

It was reported that The X Factor had broken the auditions record in Los Angeles, California on March 27.

The MyStudio HD audition booths opened in Honolulu, Hawaii; Phoenix, Arizona; Nashville, Tennessee; Anchorage, Alaska; Kansas City, Kansas; and Denver, Colorado. Originally scheduled to end on April 30, 2011, the booths' opening ended up being extended until May 8, 2011. After it was announced that people auditioning through this method was in such high demand, auditions at the booths' ended up being extended until May 15, 2011.

On June 3, Cowell announced that applicants could upload a video of them singing onto YouTube and it was opened for one week only (June 9). Selected applicants would appear in front of the judges.

The last set of auditions took place during May and June 2011. These auditions individually occur simultaneously before both the judges and a live studio audience; and with such audience in attendance able to applaud/cheer approval or disapproval and perhaps influencing the judges.

Summary of judges' auditions
City	Date	Venue	Date aired	Judges			
Los Angeles, California	May 8–9, 2011	Galen Center	September 21, 2011	Reid	Cole	Abdul	Cowell
Chicago, Illinois	May 19–20, 2011	Sears Centre	September 28, 2011	Reid	Cole	Abdul	Cowell
Newark, New Jersey	June 8–9, 2011	Prudential Center	September 29, 2011	Reid	Scherzinger	Abdul	Cowell
Miami, Florida	June 14–15, 2011	BankUnited Center	September 22, 2011	Reid	Scherzinger	Abdul	Cowell
Dallas, Texas	June 21–22, 2011	American Airlines Center	September 22, 2011	Reid	Scherzinger	Abdul	Cowell
Seattle, Washington	June 28–30, 2011	KeyArena	September 21 & 28, 2011	Reid	Scherzinger	Abdul	Cowell

Auditions footage first aired on September 21, though they were not aired in the same order that they occurred.

=== Boot camp ===
Day one of boot camp started with dance training with choreographer Brian Friedman and then the acts were called to the stage in groups of 10 to sing in front of the judges. After all of them performed, the acts were brought in front of the judges as part of one of three groups. Two of these groups made it through and one was eliminated, leaving 100 acts still in the competition. The judges threw a party for the remaining acts that for many lasted late into the night.

Day two started with everyone getting woken up at 6:00am and heading to meet Reid. He informed them that they would be put into "ensembles" and groups, and would be working with stylists, choreographers, and vocal coaches. They were given five hours to learn the songs they were given. One third of the acts would be eliminated by the end of the second day. Several of the ensembles performances were aired. The first ensemble performed "Creep", the second ensemble performed "I Still Haven't Found What I'm Looking For", the third ensemble performed "Desperado", the fourth ensemble performed "Wishing on a Star", the fifth ensemble performed "Superman (It's Not Easy)", the sixth ensemble performed "Feeling Good", the seventh ensemble performed "I Have Nothing" and the eighth ensemble performed "Run".

Day two continued with more ensembles performing for the judges. The ninth ensemble performed "What's Going On". Next, they showed a couple of quick shots of some ensembles, presumably consisting of all people that would not make it through to the end. The tenth ensemble that was covered in detail performed "I Won't Let Go". The eleventh (and final) ensemble performed "Chasing Cars". Next, the judges deliberated, and decided on which a third of the acts would be eliminated. Once again, three groups were brought in. Group 1 was eliminated, meaning groups 2 and 3 made it through to the next round of boot camp.

Day three had all 64 acts perform for the judges. They were given a list of 35 songs at the end of the day two and were told to choose one that best represented them. At the end of this final boot camp round, 32 acts would go through to judges' houses. This final performance was done in front of a crowd of 3,000 people. After each of the performances, the judges gave no feedback.

The first boot camp episode aired on October 5, 2011, and covered the first two days of boot camp. The second bootcamp episode aired on October 6 and covered the rest of day two and the remainder of bootcamp. By the end of bootcamp, 162 acts were cut to 32, 8 acts in each category. The judges later found out which category they would mentor and their acts joined them at their house.

=== Judges' houses ===
Enrique Iglesias helped Scherzinger select her contestants in Malibu, California and Pharrell Williams acted as a guest judge helping Abdul to pick her contestants in Santa Barbara, California. Rihanna helped Reid choose his contestants in The Hamptons, New York. Mariah Carey was contracted to aid Cowell in France, but was unable to attend due to Hurricane Irene grounding her flight to Paris, so Cowell was instead assisted by three vocal coaches.

In the United States, footage from judges' houses was originally scheduled to air on October 12, 13 and 18. However, due to weather delaying the start of the 2011 American League Championship Series, the footage from judges' houses 1 was moved to October 13, with footage from judges' houses 2 seen instead on October 16. The footage from judges' houses 3 aired on October 18 as scheduled and featured footage of the judges revealing their four finalists (or five in the case of Cowell) in each category to take through to the live shows. In Canada, the judges' houses 1 episode was broadcast as originally scheduled on October 12. No episode was shown in Canada on October 13, with CTV and CTV Two opting to follow Fox's scheduling changes to take advantage of simultaneous substitution rules.

Summary of judges' houses
Judge	Category	Location	Assistant(s)	Acts Eliminated
Abdul	Groups	Santa Barbara, California	Pharrell Williams	2Squar'd; 4Shore; The Anser; Illusion Confusion
Cowell	Girls	France	Three vocal coaches	Melanie Amaro; Caitlin Koch; Jazzlyn Little; Tora Woloshin
Reid	Boys	The Hamptons, New York	Rihanna	Skyelor Anderson; Tim Cifers; Brennin Hunt; Nick Voss
Scherzinger	Over 30s	Malibu, California	Enrique Iglesias	Tiger Budbill; Christa Collins; Elaine Gibbs; James Kenney

Melanie Amaro was initially eliminated from the Girls' category, but was invited back to the competition after Cowell decided he had made a mistake in not including her, bringing the total number of contestants to 17.

== Acts ==
The top seventeen acts were confirmed as follows;

Key:

– Winner
– Runner-Up
Wildcard (Live Shows)

Act	Age(s)	Hometown	Category (mentor)	Result
Melanie Amaro	18	Fort Lauderdale, Florida	Girls (Cowell)	Winner
Josh Krajcik	30	Wooster, Ohio	Over 30s (Scherzinger)	Runner-Up
Chris Rene	29	Santa Cruz, California	Boys (Reid)	3rd Place
Marcus Canty	20	Bowie, Maryland	Boys (Reid)	4th Place
Rachel Crow	13	Mead, Colorado	Girls (Cowell)	5th Place
Drew	14	Chino Valley, Arizona	Girls (Cowell)	6th Place
Astro	15	Brooklyn, New York	Boys (Reid)	7th Place
LeRoy Bell	60	Tacoma, Washington	Over 30s (Scherzinger)	8th Place
Lakoda Rayne	17–23	Various	Groups (Abdul)	9th Place
Stacy Francis	42	Los Angeles, California	Over 30s (Scherzinger)	10th Place
The Stereo Hogzz	24–25	Houston, Texas	Groups (Abdul)	11th Place
InTENsity	12–17	Various	Groups (Abdul)	12th Place
Simone Battle	22	Los Angeles, California	Girls (Cowell)	13th Place
Tiah Tolliver	20	Chula Vista, California	Girls (Cowell)	14th Place
Dexter Haygood	49	Memphis, Tennessee	Over 30s (Scherzinger)	15th Place
The Brewer Boys	15 & 18	Temecula, California	Groups (Abdul)	16th Place
Phillip Lomax	22	Seattle, Washington	Boys (Reid)	17th Place

== Live shows ==
The first two-and-a-half hour live show aired on a special Tuesday time slot on October 25; which followed the same format as the 2011 series of the UK show with each of the judges narrowing their number of acts down to three, without a public vote. The public vote started with the following performance and results shows starting November 2, which aired on Wednesdays and Thursdays respectively (except for the live shows on November 22 and 23, that aired on Tuesday and Wednesday respectively during Thanksgiving). The two-part finale was held on December 21 and 22.

There was no guest performance during the first week. The second live result show featured a performance from Outasight. Jessie J and Willow Smith performed on the third live results show, while the fourth live results show featured a performance from Rihanna. Kelly Clarkson and Bruno Mars performed on the fifth live result show while Tinie Tempah performed on the sixth live result show. Mary J. Blige and Lenny Kravitz performed on the seventh live results show while Florence + The Machine and The X Factor USA judge Nicole Scherzinger performed on the semi-final results show. The final featured performances from Justin Bieber, Leona Lewis, 50 Cent, Stevie Wonder, Pitbull and Ne-Yo.

=== Results summary ===
Color key

Act in Boys

Act in Girls

Act in Over 30s

Act in Groups

–	Act was eliminated by their mentor (no public vote or final showdown)
–	Act was in the bottom two/three and had to sing again in the final showdown
–	Act was in the bottom three but received the fewest votes and was immediately eliminated
–	Act received the fewest public votes and was immediately eliminated (no final showdown)
–	Act received the most public votes

Weekly results per act
Act	Week 1	Week 2	Week 3	Week 4	Week 5	Week 6	Quarter-Final	Semi-Final	Final	
Act	Week 1	Week 2	Week 3	Week 4	Week 5	Week 6	Quarter-Final	Semi-Final	First Vote	Second Vote
Melanie Amaro	Saved	Safe	Safe	Safe	Safe	Safe	Safe	Safe	Safe	Winner
Josh Krajcik	Saved	Safe	Safe	Safe	Safe	Safe	Safe	Safe	Safe	Runner-Up
Chris Rene	Saved	Safe	Safe	Safe	Safe	Safe	Safe	Safe	3rd	Eliminated (final)
Marcus Canty	Saved	Safe	Safe	Safe	7th	Bottom three	4th	4th	Eliminated (semi-final)	
Rachel Crow	Saved	Safe	Safe	Safe	Safe	Safe	5th	Eliminated (quarter-final)		
Drew	Saved	Safe	Safe	Safe	Safe	Bottom three	Eliminated (week 6)			
Astro	Saved	Safe	Safe	Bottom two	Safe	7th	Eliminated (week 6)			
LeRoy Bell	Saved	Safe	Safe	Safe	8th	Eliminated (week 5)				
Lakoda Rayne	Saved	Safe	Bottom two	Safe	9th	Eliminated (week 5)				
Stacy Francis	Saved	Safe	Safe	Bottom two	Eliminated (week 4)					
The Stereo Hogzz	Saved	Bottom two	Bottom two	Eliminated (week 3)						
InTENsity	Saved	Bottom two	Eliminated (week 2)							
Simone Battle	Eliminated	Eliminated (week 1)								
Tiah Tolliver	Eliminated	Eliminated (week 1)								
Dexter Haygood	Eliminated	Eliminated (week 1)								
The Brewer Boys	Eliminated	Eliminated (week 1)								
Phillip Lomax	Eliminated	Eliminated (week 1)								
Final Showdown	None^{1}	InTENsity, The Stereo Hogzz	Lakoda Rayne, The Stereo Hogzz	Astro, Francis	Bell, Canty	Canty, Drew	Canty, Crow	No final showdown or judges' votes; results were based on public votes alone		
Judges voted to	Send Through	Eliminate						No final showdown or judges' votes; results were based on public votes alone		
Reid's vote (Boys)	Astro, Canty, Rene	InTENsity	The Stereo Hogzz	Francis	Bell	Drew	Crow	No final showdown or judges' votes; results were based on public votes alone		
Scherzinger's vote (Over 30s)	Francis, Krajcik, Bell	InTENsity	The Stereo Hogzz	Astro	Canty	Drew	Crow	No final showdown or judges' votes; results were based on public votes alone		
Abdul's vote (Groups)	The Stereo Hogzz, Lakoda Rayne, InTENsity	InTENsity	Lakoda Rayne	Francis	Canty	Drew	Canty	No final showdown or judges' votes; results were based on public votes alone		
Cowell's vote (Girls)	Drew, Crow, Amaro	The Stereo Hogzz	The Stereo Hogzz	Francis	Bell	Canty	Canty	No final showdown or judges' votes; results were based on public votes alone		
Eliminated	Phillip Lomax by Reid	InTENsity; 3 of 4 votes Majority	The Stereo Hogzz; 3 of 4 votes Majority	Stacy Francis; 3 of 4 votes Majority	Lakoda Rayne; Public vote to save	Astro; Public vote to save	Rachel Crow; 2 of 4 votes Deadlock	Marcus Canty; Public vote to save	Chris Rene; Public vote to win	Josh Krajcik; Public vote to win
Eliminated	The Brewer Boys by Abdul	InTENsity; 3 of 4 votes Majority	The Stereo Hogzz; 3 of 4 votes Majority	Stacy Francis; 3 of 4 votes Majority	Lakoda Rayne; Public vote to save	Astro; Public vote to save	Rachel Crow; 2 of 4 votes Deadlock	Marcus Canty; Public vote to save	Chris Rene; Public vote to win	Josh Krajcik; Public vote to win
Eliminated	Dexter Haygood by Scherzinger	InTENsity; 3 of 4 votes Majority	The Stereo Hogzz; 3 of 4 votes Majority	Stacy Francis; 3 of 4 votes Majority	Lakoda Rayne; Public vote to save	Astro; Public vote to save	Rachel Crow; 2 of 4 votes Deadlock	Marcus Canty; Public vote to save	Chris Rene; Public vote to win	Josh Krajcik; Public vote to win
Eliminated	Dexter Haygood by Scherzinger	InTENsity; 3 of 4 votes Majority	The Stereo Hogzz; 3 of 4 votes Majority	Stacy Francis; 3 of 4 votes Majority	LeRoy Bell; 2 of 4 votes Deadlock	Drew; 3 of 4 votes Majority	Rachel Crow; 2 of 4 votes Deadlock	Marcus Canty; Public vote to save	Chris Rene; Public vote to win	Josh Krajcik; Public vote to win
Eliminated	Simone Battle by Cowell	InTENsity; 3 of 4 votes Majority	The Stereo Hogzz; 3 of 4 votes Majority	Stacy Francis; 3 of 4 votes Majority	LeRoy Bell; 2 of 4 votes Deadlock	Drew; 3 of 4 votes Majority	Rachel Crow; 2 of 4 votes Deadlock	Marcus Canty; Public vote to save	Chris Rene; Public vote to win	Josh Krajcik; Public vote to win
Eliminated	Tiah Tolliver by Cowell	InTENsity; 3 of 4 votes Majority	The Stereo Hogzz; 3 of 4 votes Majority	Stacy Francis; 3 of 4 votes Majority	LeRoy Bell; 2 of 4 votes Deadlock	Drew; 3 of 4 votes Majority	Rachel Crow; 2 of 4 votes Deadlock	Marcus Canty; Public vote to save	Chris Rene; Public vote to win	Josh Krajcik; Public vote to win
Reference(s)										

- ^1 There was no public vote in the first week. Each mentor had to select three of their own acts to advance to the second week.

=== Live show details ===
==== Week 1 (October 25) ====
Acts' performances on the first live show
Act	Category (mentor)	Order	Song	Result
Astro	Boys (Reid)	1	"Jump"	Safe
Chris Rene	Boys (Reid)	2	"Love Don't Live Here Anymore"	Safe
Phillip Lomax	Boys (Reid)	3	"I'm a Believer"	Eliminated
Marcus Canty	Boys (Reid)	4	"Do You Really Want to Hurt Me"	Safe
The Stereo Hogzz	Groups (Abdul)	5	"Try a Little Tenderness"	Safe
The Brewer Boys	Groups (Abdul)	6	"Rich Girl"/"Faith"	Eliminated
InTENsity	Groups (Abdul)	7	"The Clapping Song"/"Footloose"	Safe
Lakoda Rayne	Groups (Abdul)	8	"Come On Eileen"	Safe
Dexter Haygood	Over 30s (Scherzinger)	9	"Womanizer"/"I Kissed a Girl"	Eliminated
LeRoy Bell	Over 30s (Scherzinger)	10	"Nobody Knows"	Safe
Stacy Francis	Over 30s (Scherzinger)	11	"One More Try"	Safe
Josh Krajcik	Over 30s (Scherzinger)	12	"Forever Young"	Safe
Simone Battle	Girls (Cowell)	13	"Just Be Good to Me"	Eliminated
Rachel Crow	Girls (Cowell)	14	"Where Did Our Love Go"/"Baby"	Safe
Drew	Girls (Cowell)	15	"Flashdance... What a Feeling"	Safe
Tiah Tolliver	Girls (Cowell)	16	"Sweet Dreams (Are Made of This)"	Eliminated
Melanie Amaro	Girls (Cowell)	17	"I Have Nothing"	Safe

- There was no public vote in the first week. Instead, each of the judges voted to eliminate one (or two for Cowell) of their own acts.

Judges' votes to eliminate

- Reid: Phillip Lomax – gave no reason.
- Abdul: The Brewer Boys – gave no reason.
- Scherzinger: Dexter Haygood – gave no reason.
- Cowell: Simone Battle and Tiah Tolliver – after Drew and Rachel Crow were saved, the decision came down to Battle, Tolliver and Melanie Amaro; Cowell believed that Amaro had the potential to win the competition.

==== Week 2 (November 2/3) ====
- Theme: American Anthems
- Group performance: "Without You"
- Musical guest: Outasight ("Tonight Is the Night")

Acts' performances on the second live show
Act	Category (mentor)	Order	Song	American Artist	Result
The Stereo Hogzz	Groups (Abdul)	1	"Rhythm Nation"	Janet Jackson	Bottom Two
Chris Rene	Boys (Reid)	2	"Superstar"	Delaney and Bonnie	Safe
LeRoy Bell	Over 30s (Scherzinger)	3	"I'm Already There"	Lonestar	Safe
Rachel Crow	Girls (Cowell)	4	"Walking on Sunshine"	Katrina and the Waves	Safe
Lakoda Rayne	Groups (Abdul)	5	"Landslide"	Fleetwood Mac	Safe
Josh Krajcik	Over 30s (Scherzinger)	6	"Jar of Hearts"	Christina Perri	Safe
Melanie Amaro	Girls (Cowell)	7	"Desperado"	The Eagles	Safe
Astro	Boys (Reid)	8	"Hip Hop Hooray"/"Get Ur Freak On"	Missy Elliott	Safe
InTENsity	Groups (Abdul)	9	"Kids in America"/"Party Rock Anthem"	LMFAO	Bottom Two
Drew	Girls (Cowell)	10	"Just a Dream"	Nelly	Safe
Marcus Canty	Boys (Reid)	11	"Nothin' on You"/"Every Little Step"	B.O.B / Bobby Brown	Safe
Stacy Francis	Over 30s (Scherzinger)	12	"Up to the Mountain"	Patty Griffin	Safe
Final showdown details
The Stereo Hogzz	Groups (Abdul)	1	"Emotion"		Safe
InTENsity	Groups (Abdul)	2	"My Life Would Suck Without You"		Eliminated

Judges' votes to eliminate

- Cowell: The Stereo Hogzz – based on the final showdown performance.
- Abdul: InTENsity – based her decision on her experience working with both groups.
- Scherzinger: InTENsity – believed that The Stereo Hogzz were more prepared.
- Reid: InTENsity – gave no reason.

==== Week 3 (November 9/10) ====
- Theme: Songs from movies
- Group performance: "Save the World"
- Musical guests: Willow Smith ("Fireball") and Jessie J ("Domino")

Acts' performances on the third live show
Act	Category (mentor)	Order	Song	Movie	Result
Stacy Francis	Over 30s (Scherzinger)	1	"Queen of the Night"	The Bodyguard	Safe
Marcus Canty	Boys (Reid)	2	"I'm Going Down"	Car Wash	Safe
Drew	Girls (Cowell)	3	"Fix You"	You, Me and Dupree	Safe
LeRoy Bell	Over 30s (Scherzinger)	4	"I Still Haven't Found What I'm Looking For"	Runaway Bride	Safe
Lakoda Rayne	Groups (Abdul)	5	"Somebody Like You"	How to Lose a Guy in 10 Days	Bottom Two
Astro	Boys (Reid)	6	"Lose Yourself"	8 Mile	Safe
Melanie Amaro	Girls (Cowell)	7	"Man in the Mirror"	Michael Jackson's This Is It	Safe
The Stereo Hogzz	Groups (Abdul)	8	"Ain't No Other Man"	Get Smart	Bottom Two
Josh Krajcik	Over 30s (Scherzinger)	9	"With a Little Help from My Friends"	Across the Universe	Safe
Chris Rene	Boys (Reid)	10	"Gangsta's Paradise"	Dangerous Minds	Safe
Rachel Crow	Girls (Cowell)	11	"I'd Rather Go Blind"	Cadillac Records	Safe
Final showdown details
Lakoda Rayne	Groups (Abdul)	1	"No Air"		Safe
The Stereo Hogzz	Groups (Abdul)	2	"You Are Not Alone"		Eliminated

Judges' votes to eliminate

- Reid: The Stereo Hogzz – said he did not like their song choices through the competition.
- Scherzinger: The Stereo Hogzz – based on her support of "female empowerment", even though she liked both groups.
- Abdul: Lakoda Rayne – originally wanted to abstain from voting as both acts were in her category, but Jones stated that if she abstained, The Stereo Hogzz would automatically be eliminated by default as Reid and Scherzinger had already voted to eliminate them and Cowell would not be required to vote; she eventually voted in favor of The Stereo Hogzz to give Cowell an opportunity to send the result to deadlock.
- Cowell: The Stereo Hogzz – based on who he thought had a greater potential to win the competition.

==== Week 4 (November 16/17) ====
- Theme: Rock
- Group performance: "We Will Rock You"
- Musical guest: Rihanna ("We Found Love")

Acts' performances on the fourth live show
Act	Category (mentor)	Order	Song	Result
LeRoy Bell	Over 30s (Scherzinger)	1	"We've Got Tonite"	Safe
Rachel Crow	Girls (Cowell)	2	"(I Can't Get No) Satisfaction"	Safe
Chris Rene	Boys (Reid)	3	"No Woman, No Cry"/"Everything's Gonna Be Alright"	Safe
Stacy Francis	Over 30s (Scherzinger)	4	"It's All Coming Back to Me Now"	Bottom Two
Melanie Amaro	Girls (Cowell)	5	"Everybody Hurts"	Safe
Josh Krajcik	Over 30s (Scherzinger)	6	"The Pretender"	Safe
Astro	Boys (Reid)	7	"I'll Be Missing You"	Bottom Two
Lakoda Rayne	Groups (Abdul)	8	"Your Love"/"Go Your Own Way"	Safe
Drew	Girls (Cowell)	9	"With or Without You"	Safe
Marcus Canty	Boys (Reid)	10	"Piece of My Heart"	Safe
Final showdown details
Stacy Francis	Over 30s (Scherzinger)	1	"Amazing Grace"	Eliminated
Astro	Boys (Reid)	2	"Never Can Say Goodbye"	Safe

Judges' votes to eliminate

- Reid: Stacy Francis – backed his own act, Astro.
- Scherzinger: Astro – backed her own act, Stacy Francis.
- Abdul: Stacy Francis – gave no reason.
- Cowell: Stacy Francis – despite chastising Astro for his attitude and not showing respect, he thought Astro had a better chance of winning the competition.

==== Week 5 (November 22/23) ====
- Theme: Giving Thanks
- Group performance: "Raise Your Glass" / "So What"
- Musical guests: Kelly Clarkson ("Stronger (What Doesn't Kill You)") and Bruno Mars ("It Will Rain")

The Pepsi Choice Group performance was chosen by the audience and included circus outfits along with a rotating stage and laser special effects in a hip-hop dance style.

Two acts were eliminated during the results show. The three acts with the fewest public votes were announced, and the act with the fewest votes was automatically eliminated. The remaining two acts then performed in the final showdown and faced the judges' votes.

Acts' performances on the fifth live show
Act	Category (mentor)	Order	Song	Dedication	Result
Rachel Crow	Girls (Cowell)	1	"I Believe"	Her parents	Safe
Marcus Canty	Boys (Reid)	2	"A Song for Mama"	His mother	Bottom Three
Melanie Amaro	Girls (Cowell)	3	"The World's Greatest"	God	Safe
Chris Rene	Boys (Reid)	4	"Let It Be" / "Young Homie"	His Drug rehabilitation counsellor Tim	Safe
Lakoda Rayne	Groups (Abdul)	5	"You Belong with Me"	Their families	Eliminated
LeRoy Bell	Over 30s (Scherzinger)	6	"Angel"	His late mother	Bottom Three
Astro	Boys (Reid)	7	"Show Me What You Got"	His fans	Safe
Drew	Girls (Cowell)	8	"Skyscraper"	Her best friend, Shelby	Safe
Josh Krajcik	Over 30s (Scherzinger)	9	"Wild Horses"	His daughter, Rowan	Safe
Final showdown details
Marcus Canty	Boys (Reid)	1	"You Lost Me"		Safe
LeRoy Bell	Over 30s (Scherzinger)	2	"Don't Let Me Down"		Eliminated

Judges' votes to eliminate

- Reid: LeRoy Bell – backed his own act, Marcus Canty, who he said was the most consistent of the two.
- Scherzinger: Marcus Canty – backed her own act, LeRoy Bell.
- Abdul: Marcus Canty – based on the final showdown performance.
- Cowell: LeRoy Bell – could not decide and sent the result to deadlock; despite saying Bell sang better in the final showdown while Canty had done better overall in the competition.

With the acts in the sing-off receiving two votes each, the result went to deadlock and reverted to the earlier public vote. Bell was eliminated as the act with the fewest public votes.

==== Week 6 (November 30/December 1) ====
- Theme: Songs by Michael Jackson
- Group performance: "Man in the Mirror"
- Musical guest: Tinie Tempah ("Pass Out")

Michael Jackson's mother, Katherine; his three children Prince, Paris, and Blanket; and his brothers Marlon, Tito, and Jackie were present in the audience during the performance show.

As in the previous week, two acts were eliminated during the results show. The three acts with the fewest public votes were announced, and the act with the fewest votes was automatically eliminated. The remaining two acts then performed in the final showdown and faced the judges' votes.

Acts' performances on the sixth live show
Act	Category (mentor)	Order	Song	Result
Josh Krajcik	Over 30s (Scherzinger)	1	"Dirty Diana"	Safe
Astro	Boys (Reid)	2	"Black or White"	Eliminated
Drew	Girls (Cowell)	3	"Billie Jean"	Bottom Three
Rachel Crow	Girls (Cowell)	4	"Can You Feel It"	Safe
Marcus Canty	Boys (Reid)	5	"P.Y.T. (Pretty Young Thing)"	Bottom Three
Chris Rene	Boys (Reid)	6	"I'll Be There"	Safe
Melanie Amaro	Girls (Cowell)	7	"Earth Song"	Safe
Final showdown details
Drew	Girls (Cowell)	1	"Listen to Your Heart"	Eliminated
Marcus Canty	Boys (Reid)	2	"Neither One of Us (Wants to Be the First to Say Goodbye)"	Safe

Judges' votes to eliminate

- Reid: Drew – backed his own act, Marcus Canty.
- Cowell: Marcus Canty – backed his own act, Drew, while also taking responsibility for her being in the final showdown.
- Scherzinger: Drew – felt that Canty gave a more emotional final showdown performance.
- Abdul: Drew – said that Canty's final showdown performance moved her more.

However, voting statistics revealed that Drew received more votes than Canty which meant that if Abdul sent the result to deadlock, Drew would have advanced to the quarter-final and Canty would have been eliminated.

==== Week 7: Quarter-Final (December 7/8) ====
- Themes: Dance music hits; contestant's choice
- Musical guests: Mary J. Blige ("Need Someone") and Lenny Kravitz ("Rock Star City Life" and "Are You Gonna Go My Way")

Nervo served as the house DJs for the first song of the night. Originally, the second song was going to be chosen by the public as part of the Pepsi Challenge, however, due to technical problems that happened with the Pepsi Challenge the night before the performance show, that feature was delayed to the semi-final and executive producers told that the contestants had only 24 hours to choose another song.

Acts' performances in the quarter-final
Act	Category (mentor)	Order	First song	Order	Second song	Result
Melanie Amaro	Girls (Cowell)	1	"Someone Like You"	6	"When You Believe"	Safe
Marcus Canty	Boys (Reid)	2	"Ain't Nobody"	7	"A Song for You"	Bottom Two
Rachel Crow	Girls (Cowell)	3	"Nothin' on You"	8	"Music and Me"	Bottom Two
Josh Krajcik	Over 30s (Scherzinger)	4	"We Found Love"	9	"Something"	Safe
Chris Rene	Boys (Reid)	5	"Live Your Life"	10	"Where Do We Go from Here"	Safe
Final showdown details
Marcus Canty	Boys (Reid)	1	"I'm Going Down"			Safe
Rachel Crow	Girls (Cowell)	2	"I'd Rather Go Blind"			Eliminated

Judges' votes to eliminate

- Reid: Rachel Crow – backed his own act, Marcus Canty.
- Cowell: Marcus Canty – gave no reason, but effectively backed his own act, Rachel Crow.
- Abdul: Marcus Canty – said that Crow's final showdown performance blew her away.
- Scherzinger: Rachel Crow – could not decide and sent the result to deadlock.

With the acts in the sing-off receiving two votes each, the result went to deadlock and reverted to the earlier public vote. Crow was eliminated as the act with the fewest public votes.

==== Week 8: Semi-Final (December 14/15) ====
- Themes: Pepsi Challenge songs, "songs to get you to the final" (no theme)
- Group performance: "No Diggity" / "Shout"
- Musical guests: Nicole Scherzinger ("Pretty") and Florence and the Machine ("Spectrum (Say My Name)")

Each act performed two songs.

List of song choices for the Pepsi Challenge
Act	Category (mentor)	Song Choices	Result
Drew	Girls (Cowell)	"Secrets"	N/A (Already Eliminated)
Drew	Girls (Cowell)	"Wherever You Will Go"	N/A (Already Eliminated)
Drew	Girls (Cowell)	"Breakeven"	N/A (Already Eliminated)
Melanie Amaro	Girls (Cowell)	"Hero"	Chosen
Melanie Amaro	Girls (Cowell)	"I Didn't Know My Own Strength"	Not Chosen
Melanie Amaro	Girls (Cowell)	"The Voice Within"	Not Chosen
Rachel Crow	Girls (Cowell)	"Forget You"	N/A (Already Eliminated)
Rachel Crow	Girls (Cowell)	"Ain't No Mountain High Enough"	N/A (Already Eliminated)
Rachel Crow	Girls (Cowell)	"Valerie"	N/A (Already Eliminated)
Astro	Boys (Reid)	"Gold Digger"	N/A (Already Eliminated)
Astro	Boys (Reid)	"Mama Said Knock You Out" / "Stop Looking at My Mom"	N/A (Already Eliminated)
Astro	Boys (Reid)	"Dirt off Your Shoulder"	N/A (Already Eliminated)
Chris Rene	Boys (Reid)	"My Love Is Your Love"	Not Chosen
Chris Rene	Boys (Reid)	"Angel"	Not Chosen
Chris Rene	Boys (Reid)	"Fly"	Chosen
Marcus Canty	Boys (Reid)	"We Belong Together"	Not Chosen
Marcus Canty	Boys (Reid)	"Saving All My Love for You"	Not Chosen
Marcus Canty	Boys (Reid)	"I'll Make Love to You"	Chosen
Josh Krajcik	Over 30s (Scherzinger)	"Chasing Pavements"	Not Chosen
Josh Krajcik	Over 30s (Scherzinger)	"Everytime You Go Away"	Not Chosen
Josh Krajcik	Over 30s (Scherzinger)	"Come Together"	Chosen

Acts' performances in the semi-final
Act	Category (mentor)	Order	First song	Order	Second song	Result
Marcus Canty	Boys (Reid)	1	"I'll Make Love to You"	5	"Careless Whisper"	Eliminated
Chris Rene	Boys (Reid)	2	"Fly"	6	"No One"	Safe
Melanie Amaro	Girls (Cowell)	3	"Hero"	7	"Feeling Good"	Safe
Josh Krajcik	Over 30s (Scherzinger)	4	"Come Together"	8	"Hallelujah"	Safe

The semi-final did not feature a final showdown and instead the act with the fewest public votes, Canty, was automatically eliminated.

==== Week 9: Final (December 21/22) ====
The final lasted for 1.5 hours on Wednesday, December 21 and 2 hours on Thursday, December 22.

December 21

- Themes: Celebrity duets; winner's song (billed as "$5 million song")
- Group performance: "They Don't Care About Us" (with Cirque du Soleil's Michael Jackson: The Immortal World Tour)

Acts' performances on the Wednesday Final
Act	Category (mentor)	Order	First song (duet)	Order	Second song
Josh Krajcik	Over 30s (Scherzinger)	1	"Uninvited" (with Alanis Morissette)	4	"At Last"
Chris Rene	Boys (Reid)	2	"Complicated" (with Avril Lavigne)	5	"Young Homie"
Melanie Amaro	Girls (Cowell)	3	"I Believe I Can Fly" (with R. Kelly)	6	"Listen"

December 22

- Theme: Christmas songs
- Group performances: "The Edge of Glory" (all top 12 contestants) and "Heroes" (performed by Melanie Amaro and Josh Krajcik)
- Musical guests: Justin Bieber with Stevie Wonder and Drew ("The Christmas Song" / "Santa Claus Is Coming to Town"), Leona Lewis ("Run"), 50 Cent with Astro ("Wait Until Tonight" / "In da Club") and Pitbull featuring Ne-Yo with Marcus Canty ("International Love" / "Give Me Everything")

Acts' performances on the Thursday Final
Act	Category (mentor)	Order	Song	Result
Melanie Amaro	Girls (Cowell)	1	"All I Want for Christmas Is You"	Winner
Chris Rene	Boys (Reid)	2	"Have Yourself a Merry Little Christmas"	Eliminated
Josh Krajcik	Over 30s (Scherzinger)	3	"Please Come Home for Christmas"	Runner-Up

== Contestants who appeared on other shows or seasons ==
- James Kenney auditioned again for season 3. He was eliminated on the first live show.
- InTENsity members Arin Ray and Ellona Santiago returned in later seasons as solo acts. Ray finished in tenth place on season 2, and Santiago finished in sixth place on season 3.
- Caitlin Koch auditioned for season 10 of American Idol. She was eliminated during the groups round in Hollywood Week.
- Stacy Francis appeared on Celebrity Big Brother 19. She was the sixth house guest evicted.
- Hayley Orrantia of Lakoda Rayne later landed a starring role on the ABC sitcom The Goldbergs. She competed on the seventh season of The Masked Singer as "Ringmaster", finishing in second place.
- Josh Kaufman was on Star Search at the age of 16 as a junior vocalist. After he was eliminated in the first season's live show, he auditioned again in The Voice in the sixth season, where he was later crowned that season's winner.
- Drew appeared on American Idol Season 23

== Deaths ==
- Simone Battle, who was eliminated during the first live show, committed suicide on September 5, 2014.

== Reception ==
=== U.S. Nielsen ratings ===
Ep. #	Episode	Airdate	Rating	Share	Rating/share (18–49)	Viewers (millions)	Rank (timeslot)	Rank (night)
1	Auditions 1	September 21	7.2	12	4.4/12	12.49	#1	#2
2	Auditions 2	September 22	7.0	11	4.3/11	12.51	#1	#2
3	Auditions 3	September 28	6.9	11	4.1/11	11.86	#1	#2
4	Auditions 4	September 29	6.9	11	3.9/11	12.17	#1	#2
5	Bootcamp 1	October 5	6.8	11	4.1/11	11.93	#1	#2
6	Bootcamp 2	October 6	7.0	11	4.0/11	11.67	#1	#1
7	Judges' houses 1	October 13 (Note: Due to a weather delay of the start of the fourth game of 2011 American League Championship Series on October 12, 2011 (also broadcast on Fox), the judges' houses 1 episode, which was originally scheduled for October 12, was moved back a day to October 13. The judges' houses 2 episode was originally scheduled for October 13 and so was also moved to October 16. The time-delay version shown in the UK was also delayed to avoid the results being shown outside of the U.S. first.)	6.4	10	3.7/10	11.24	#1	#1
8	Judges' houses 2	October 16		10	3.4/10	8.84	#1	#2
9	Judges' houses 3	October 18		10	3.9/10	10.39	#1	#1
10	Live show 1/Finalists revealed	October 25	7.0	12	4.4/12	12.09	#1	#1
11	Live show 2	November 2	6.8	11	4.0/11	11.76	#1	#1
12	Live results 2	November 3	6.4	11	3.7/11	11.64	#2	#2
13	Live show 3	November 9		10	3.8/10	10.25	#2	#2
14	Live results 3	November 10		9	3.3/9	10.13	#2	#4
15	Live show 4	November 16		10	3.9/10	11.31	#1	#2
16	Live results 4	November 17		9	3.1/9	9.71	#2	#3
17	Live show 5	November 22	5.8	9	3.2/9	9.43	#2	#3
18	Live results 5	November 23		8	2.5/8	8.51	#2	#3
19	Live show 6	November 30		10	3.7/10	11.05	#1	#1
20	Live results 6	December 1	6.0	9	3.1/9	10.34	#1	#1
21	Live show 7	December 7		9	3.4/9	10.70	#1	#3
22	Live results 7	December 8		8	2.9/8	9.84	#2	#3
23	Live show 8	December 14		9	3.4/9	10.69	#1	#3
24	Live results 8	December 15		9	2.9/9	9.87	#1	#2
25	Live final	December 21	6.9	10	3.3/10	11.23	#1	#1
26	Live final results	December 22	7.5	11	3.8/11	12.59	#1	#1

=== Controversy ===
==== Nicole Scherzinger ====
Scherzinger had been proven to be an unpopular judge, with her performance during her one-season stint being panned by critics, as well as early controversy of her replacing Cheryl Cole on the judging panel.

In the quarter-final result show, Scherzinger who had the deciding vote, was clearly upset with the bottom two acts (Rachel Crow and Marcus Canty) because she admired both acts and was undecided about how she would vote. Her vote either meant that if she would eliminate Canty, Canty would be eliminated or if she voted against Crow, the result would go to deadlock and the public vote would determine the result. While Scherzinger was deliberating, she wanted the public vote to decide the outcome that week and sent the result to deadlock. Following this, Crow was voted out which led to Crow breaking down on stage and Scherzinger was booed off the stage and her future on the show was put in jeopardy. She subsequently received death threats from some viewers. Scherzinger was let go at the end of the season and later relocated to the United Kingdom to be a judge on the 2012 series of the UK show to replace Kelly Rowland. On the UK show, Scherzinger became a successful and popular judge.
