= Young Homie =

2012 single by Chris Rene

Single by Chris Rene

from the album I'm Right Here
- Released: March 13, 2012
- Genre: Pop rap, R&B, hip hop
- Length: 3:28
- Label: Epic
- Songwriters: Chris Rene, Gabriel Rene, Gina Rene, J.R. Rotem, Marty James, Gene Pistilli, Walter Murphy
- Producers: J.R. Rotem, Marty James

Chris Rene singles chronology
"Young Homie" (2012)	"Trouble" (2012)

Music video
- "Young Homie" on YouTube

"Young Homie" is the debut single written and performed by American singer-songwriter Chris Rene. It is the first single from Rene's debut studio EP I'm Right Here. The song debuted at number one on the New Zealand singles chart on March 19, 2012.

== Background ==
Rene wrote the song prior to auditioning for the first season of the American version of singing talent competition The X Factor. Rene performed the song a total of three times on the show.

== Release ==
"Young Homie" was released on March 13, 2012. It was the lead single from Rene's album I'm Right Here. Rene previewed a first listen to fans online via SoundCloud on February 23. The song debuted at #1 in New Zealand and reached #1 on the U.S. Billboard Bubbling Under Hot 100 chart. It also reached #26 on the U.S. Pop Airplay chart and #72 on the Canadian Hot 100 chart.

== Music video ==
An accompanying music video followed the release on March 20, 2012. The video was directed by Jeremy Rall and premiered on VEVO.

== Chart positions ==
Chart (2012)	Peak position
Canada Hot 100 (Billboard)	72
Ireland (IRMA)	64
New Zealand (Recorded Music NZ)	1
US Bubbling Under Hot 100 Singles (Billboard)	1
US Pop Airplay (Billboard)	26

== Release history ==
Release dates and formats for "Young Homie"
Region	Date	Format	Label(s)	Ref.
United States	February 21, 2012	Mainstream airplay	Epic	
