= I'm Right Here (EP) =

EP by Chris Rene
- Released: October 2, 2012
- Recorded: December 2011 – June 2012
- Genres: Hip hop, soul, R&B
- Length: 24:39
- Labels: Epic, Syco
- Producers: busbee, Christian Rich, Chuck Harmony, Claude Kelly, J. Bonilla, J.R. Rotem, Jon Levine, Mitchum Chin, Peter Biker, Soulshock, Supa Dups

Chris Rene chronology
Soul'd Out (2009)	I'm Right Here (2012)

Singles from I'm Right Here
- 1. "Young Homie" Released: March 13, 2012; 2. "Trouble" Released: June 26, 2012; 3. "Rockin' With You" Released: October 9, 2012

I'm Right Here is the debut studio extended play by American singer-songwriter, rapper and musician Chris Rene released on October 2, 2012 through Syco and Epic Records. This is Rene's first major label project, and second studio work overall, after he released his 2009 independent studio album, Soul'd Out. Rene, a third-place finalist from the inaugural season of the U.S. version of The X Factor, was signed to Epic by his mentor, L.A. Reid. Rene began production on his album in December 2011, and completed recording by June 2012. The record boasts assistance on writing and productions from Alex Lambert, Brandyn Burnette, busbee, Christian Rich, Chuck Harmony, Claude Kelly, J. Bonilla, J.R. Rotem, Jon Levine, Lauren Evans, Marlin "Hookman" Bonds, Marty James, Mitchum Chin, Peter Biker, Supa Dups and Talay Riley, along with compositions from Rene's brother and sister, Gabriel and Gina.

The album debuted at #55 on the Billboard 200 charts, selling around 9,000 units in its first week. It dropped off the chart after just two weeks and has sold over 22,000 copies as of 2013. Young Homie was issued as the official first single from the album in March 2012. Though the song failed to chart on the U.S. Billboard Hot 100, it did land at #1 on both the New Zealand chart and the U.S. Billboard Bubbling Under Hot 100, #26 on the U.S. Top 40 Pop chart, #72 on the Canadian Hot 100 chart and is certified platinum in New Zealand. The single also sold 293,000 units in digital download sales in the U.S., according to Nielsen Soundscan. The second official single released from the album is the reggae-tinged pop song Trouble. The single debuted at 100 on the US Hot 100 Airplay charts and is certified gold in New Zealand.

== Development ==
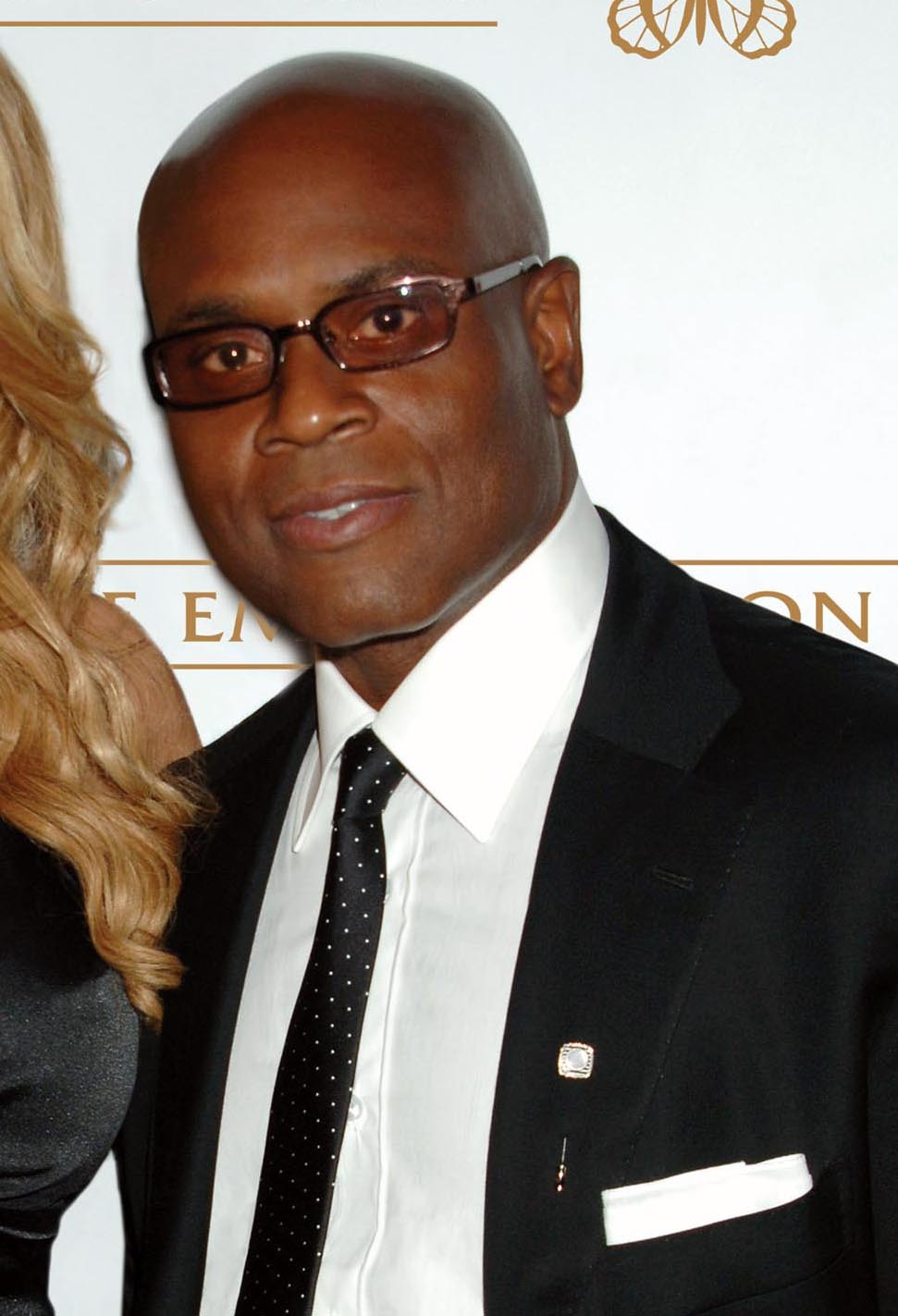
The X Factor judge and mentor L.A. Reid signed Rene to Epic Records.

Chris Rene auditioned for the debut season of the US version of The X Factor. Rene ultimately finished the season in third place, behind runner-up Josh Krajcik and winner Melanie Amaro. Rene, along with season one The X Factor winner Melanie Amaro, and fellow finalists Marcus Canty and Astro, were signed to mentor L.A. Reid's revamped label Epic Records in December 2011, a day after the X-Factor finale. Rene's contract was reportedly worth $150,000 to $500,000.

Rene immediately entered the studio in Los Angeles with writer Marty James and producer J.R. Rotem to rework his popular song, "Young Homie". The song was to be released as his official first single under the label.

== Composition ==
Rene's musical style is described as both "current and easily identifiable." Rene draws his influences from rock 'n' roll, reggae, blues, punk and rap, and is inspired by artists such as Stevie Wonder, Bob Marley, Billy Joel, Kanye West, Eric Clapton, Rihanna, Elton John, Bone Thugs-n-Harmony, Eminem, Led Zeppelin and more. Rene uses a vocal blend of rapping and singing. He calls this blend "ringing," a term coined by his sister Gina Rene. In advance of the album's release, Rene stated that the album would have "a little of everything; you got pop songs, rap songs, a mixture of rap-singing, rapping...". The album features themes such as love, women, and overcoming obstacles.

== Release and promotion ==
I'm Right Here was released on October 2, 2012 through Epic Records and Syco Music in physical and digital download formats. It debuted at number 55 on the Billboard 200. Rene embarked on a U.S. radio promotional tour, concert appearances with Austin Mahone, Sean Kingston, Cher Lloyd, Karmin, Flo Rida, Cody Simpson, The Wanted, Carly Rae Jepsen, Maroon 5 and more.

"Young Homie"

"Young Homie" was released as the album's lead single on March 13, 2012. Rene previewed a first listen to fans online via SoundCloud on February 23. An accompanying music video followed the release on March 20, 2012. The video was directed by Jeremy Rall and premiered on VEVO. Though the song failed to chart on the U.S. Billboard Hot 100, it did land at #1 on both the New Zealand chart and the U.S. Billboard Bubbling Under Hot 100, #26 on the U.S. Top 40 Pop chart, #72 on the Canadian Hot 100 chart and is certified platinum in New Zealand. The single also sold 261,000 units in digital download sales in the U.S., according to Nielsen Soundscan.

"Trouble" was released as the album's second official single. It impacted radio stations June 26, 2012. The music video, which features model Tyri Rudolph as Rene's leading lady, premiered on VEVO August 13, 2012. The single debuted at #100 on the Billboard Hot 100 Airplay charts. It is also certified gold in New Zealand.

== Track listing ==
Standard edition
No.	Title	Writer(s)	Producer(s)	Length
1.	"Chains"	Jon Levine, Brandyn Burnette, Lauren Evans, 'Hookman' Marlin Bonds, Chris Rene	Jon Levine	3:25
2.	"Rockin' with You"	Claude Kelly, Chuck Harmony, Rene	Chuck Harmony, Claude Kelly*	3:22
3.	"Back from the Dead"	D. Chin-Quee, Mitchum Chin, Rene, Gabriel Rene	Dwayne "Supa Dups" Chin-Quee, Mitchum "Khan" Chin*	3:54
4.	"Trouble"	busbee, Alex Lambert, J Bonilla	busbee, J. Bonilla	3:05
5.	"Gonna Be Ok"	busbee, Rene, Burnette, Gabriel Rene	busbee	3:43
6.	"Love Me Like You"	Carsten Schack, Peter Biker, Kelly, Rene, Gabriel Rene, Carsten Schack	Soulshock, Peter Biker	3:40
7.	"Young Homie"	Rene, Gabriel Rene, Gina Rene, Marty James	J.R. Rotem	3:31

iTunes exclusive bonus track
No.	Title	Writer(s)	Producer(s)	Length
8.	"Tidal Wave"	Rene, Gabriel Rene, Kehinde Hassan, Taiwo Hassan, Stephen Patrick Lee, Talay Riley	Christian Rich	4:10

Amazon exclusive bonus track
No.	Title	Writer(s)	Producer(s)	Length
8.	"I Made It"	Rene, Gabriel Rene, Eric Bellinger, Harmony Samuels	Harmony Samuels	3:55

(*) Denotes co-producer

Sample credits

- "Young Homie" contains a sample of "I Like Funky Music" composed by Walter Murphy and Gene Pastilli.

== Credits and personnel ==
Credits for I'm Right Here adapted from AllMusic.

- Anzo – engineer
- Victoria Aronson – grooming
- Stellina Bickers – A&R
- Peter Biker – arranger, composer, instrumentation, producer
- Marlin "Hookman" Bonds – composer
- J. Bonilla – composer, producer, programming
- Anita Marisa Boriboon – art direction
- Delbert Bowers – assistant
- Brandyn Burnette – background vocals, composer
- Busbee – bass, background vocals, composer, engineer, instrumentation, piano, producer, programming, strings, ukulele
- Ben Chang – engineer
- Mitchum Chin – composer, producer
- Chin-Quee – composer
- Lauren Evans – composer
- Mike Flynn – A&R
- Chris Gellard – assistant
- Chuck Harmony – composer, producer
- Trehy Harris – assistant
- Marty James – composer
- Jaycen Joshua – mixing
- JP Robinson – creative director
- Claude Kelly – background vocals, composer, producer, vocal producer
- Gelly Kusuna – engineer
- Dave Kutch – mastering
- Tyson Kuteyl – mixing
- Alex Lambert – background vocals, composer
- Jon Levine – composer, engineer, producer, programming
- Manny Marroquin – mixing
- Conrad Martin – production coordination
- Morgan O'Malley – A&R
- Dwayne "Supa Dups" Chin Quee – producer
- Chris Rene – composer, primary artists, vocals (background)
- Gabriel Rene – composer
- Gina Rene – composer
- April Roomet – stylist
- Carsten "Mintman" Mortensen – add. Keyboard
- J.R. Rotem – producer
- Carsten Schack – composer
- Soulshock – arranger, instrumentation, mixing, producer
- Carlos Taylor – production coordinator

== Release history ==
Country	Dates	Format(s)	Label(s)
United States	October 2, 2012	CD, digital download	Epic/Syco
United Kingdom	October 2, 2012	CD, digital download	Epic
France	October 2, 2012	CD, digital download	Epic
Germany	October 2, 2012	CD, digital download	Epic
Canada	October 2, 2012	CD, digital download	Epic
