= Rockin' with You =

"Rockin' With You"

Single by Chris Rene

from the album I'm Right Here
- Released: October 9, 2012
- Recorded: February 2012
- Genre: R&B, urban pop
- Length: 3:22
- Label: Epic, Syco
- Songwriters: Chris Rene, Gabriel Rene, Gina Rene, Claude Kelly, Chuck Harmony
- Producers: Chuck Harmony, Claude Kelly

Chris Rene singles chronology
"Trouble" (2012)	"Rockin' With You" (2012)

"Rockin' With You" is a song by Epic Records recording artist Chris Rene. It appears on his debut EP, I'm Right Here, and was released as the third official single from the EP. It was written by the Rene siblings: Chris, Gabriel and Gina, an co-written/produced by Claude Kelly and Chuck Harmony. Rene released a preview of the song on his Facebook page.

== Background ==
The single was written by Chris Rene, his brother and sister Gabriel and Gina, X Factor vocal coach Claude Kelly and producer Charles "Chuck Harmony" Harmon, and recorded in early 2012. At the 2012 MTV Video Music Awards, Chris teased that the song would become his third single from the album. On September 13, 2012, Rene previewed a first listen of the single to his fans through his Facebook account. Rene says of the single: "this song is about basically a guy kind of being mischievous and not being truthful at the beginning, but what it really comes down to is he wants to be passionate about one girl and to have that love in his life. It's all about her. He's only rocking with her. I think a lot of people are going to feel it."

== Critical reception ==
Michele Amabile Angermiller of The Hollywood Reporter took a positive liking to the song, saying that it "reveals a crisp, breezy sound that showcases Rene's honeyed vocals as well as his rapping skills and sweet romantic rhymes."

== Live performances ==
Rene first performed the song live while embarking on his promotional tour. On August 12, 2012, Chris acoustically performed the televised debut of both "Trouble" and "Rockin With You" on VH1's Big Morning Buzz Live.

== Credits and personnel ==
Credits are taken from I'm Right Here liner notes.

- Lead vocals: Chris Rene
- Background vocals: Claude Kelly
- Written by: Claude Kelly, Chuck Harmony and Chris Rene
- Recorded by: Ben "Bengineer" Chang
- Mix engineer: Jaycen Joshua
  - Assisted by: Trehy Harris
- Produced by: Chuck Harmony, Claude Kelly (co-produced & vocal production)
  - Production coordination: Conrad Martin and Carlos Taylor

Notes

- According to BMI's website publishing, Gabriel and Gina Rene are co-writers on the track, contrary to the album liner notes.
