= Marcus Canty =

American R&B and soul singer and dancer

- Born: Marcus Canty; January 22, 1991 (age 35); Washington, D.C., U.S.
- Genres: Pop, R&B, soul
- Occupations: Singer-songwriter, dancer
- Instruments: Vocals, piano, keyboards
- Years active: 2011–present
- Label: Epic Records

Marcus Canty (born January 22, 1991) is an American R&B and soul singer and dancer. He was the tenth contestant eliminated in the first season of The X Factor USA.

== Early life ==
Marcus Canty was born in Washington, D.C., and raised in Landover, Maryland by his single mother, Darlene M. Canty. He attended Columbia Park Elementary School in Landover, Maryland; Hyattsville Middle School, in Hyattsville, Maryland; DeMatha Catholic High School also in Hyattsville, Maryland; and graduated from Montrose Christian School in Rockville, Maryland. He started acting at the age of 3 in church plays and graduated to the big stage in an award-winning OneStage production's play titled, A Family That Prays Together. He didn't tap into his singing talent until the age of 11. His first public performance was at the world-famous Apollo Theater in New York where he won second place against adult and youth contenders. He continued singing in church, school choirs, county and state choirs, while also singing in talent shows and other competitions and events throughout the United States and Canada. While singing was something that came natural to Canty, basketball was his first real love. He began playing the sport at the age of eight and continued to play throughout high school until he was given an ultimatum of basketball or singing. Realizing that he wouldn't be 6'6" tall, singing became his obvious choice, and he is now pursuing his dreams. He is a 2009 YoungArts alumnus.

== Music career ==
During his audition on the X-Factor, he sang "I Wish" by Stevie Wonder. His musical influences include Marvin Gaye, Luther Vandross, Stevie Wonder, Usher, Donny Hathaway, Boyz II Men, Mary J. Blige, Monica, Bobby Brown, and Whitney Houston. At judges' houses, he performed "All My Life" by K-Ci & JoJo. In the fifth week, he was in the bottom two against LeRoy Bell but was saved after the result went to deadlock. On December 1, he ended up in the bottom three with Drew and Astro, and had to sing off against Drew. Simon Cowell voted to send Drew through to the quarter-final, but L.A. Reid, Nicole Scherzinger and Paula Abdul voted to send Canty through to the quarter-final. However Drew received more votes than Canty meaning if Abdul sent the result to deadlock, Drew would have advanced to the quarter-final and Canty would have been eliminated. In the quarter-final, he ended up in the bottom two yet again, along with Rachel Crow. Cowell and Abdul voted to send Crow to the semi-final, but Reid and Scherzinger voted to send Canty to the semi-final. This meant Scherzinger sent the result to deadlock and Canty advanced to the semi-final after receiving more votes than Crow. In the semi-final, Canty was eliminated by receiving the fewest votes.

=== Performances and results ===
Performance	Theme	Song choice	Result
Audition	Auditioner's Choice	"I Wish”	Through to Bootcamp
Judges; Houses	Solo	"All My Life”	Through to Live Shows
Week 1	N/A	"Do You Really Want To Hurt Me?"	Safe by L.A. Reid
Week 2	N/A	"Every Little Step”	Safe (5th)
Week 3	Songs from Movies	"I'm Going Down”	Safe (9th)
Week 4	Rock	"Piece of My Heart”	Safe (8th)
Week 5	Giving Thanks	"A Song for Mama”	Bottom three
Final Showdown (Week 5)	No theme	"You Lost Me"	Saved by Deadlock (7th)
Week 6	Michael Jackson	"PYT (Pretty Young Thing)”	Bottom three
Final Showdown (Week 6)	No theme	"Neither One of Us (Wants to Be the First to Say Goodbye)"	Saved by Judges' Vote (6th)
Week 7	Dance Music Hits	"Ain't Nobody”	Bottom two
Week 7	Save Me Songs	"Song For You"	Bottom two
Final Showdown (Week 7)	No theme	I'm Going Down	Saved by Deadlock (4th)
Week 8	Pepsi Challenge	"I'll Make Love To You"	Eliminated by Public Vote (4th)
Week 8	"Get me to the final" songs (no specific theme)	"Careless Whisper"	Eliminated by Public Vote (4th)

=== Post X-Factor ===
On January 18, 2012, Epic Records announced that Canty, along with two other contestants, who were also mentored by LA Reid, had all signed recording contracts.

On March 7, 2012, Canty released his first single "Won't Make a Fool Out of You", which was featured in the 2012 film Think Like a Man, an adaptation of Steve Harvey's book Act Like a Lady, Think Like a Man. As of March 22, 2012, "Won't Make A Fool Out of You" charted at No. 98 on Billboard's R&B chart. It was sent to urban AC radio stations on May 15, 2012 as the third single from the soundtrack. On July 31, Marcus released his second single, "In & Out", which featured Wale.

Marcus released his debut extended play, This...Is Marcus Canty, on March 5, 2013. The EP debuted at 114 on the US Billboard 200. Marcus stated that he did not only want to show his R&B style on the album, but he also wanted to "impress the ladies". The extended play contains musical elements from artists such as Michael Jackson, Janet Jackson and Usher. In the aftermath, the label put him on a shelf because of change in staff, and was no longer able to receive a call from anyone on the label.

== Discography ==
=== Singles ===
Year	Title	Peak chart positions		Album
Year	Title	US	US R&B	Album
2012	"Won't Make A Fool Out Of You"	—	68	Think Like a Man
2012	"In & Out" (Feat. Wale)	—	56	This...Is Marcus Canty
2012	"Used By You"	—	—	This...Is Marcus Canty

=== Extended plays ===
Title	Details	Peak chart positions	Sales
Title	Details	US	Sales
This...Is Marcus Canty	Release: March 5, 2013; Label: Epic; Format: Digital download	114	4,000

=== Studio albums ===
- Jazzy Knights (2020)
