= Chris Rene =

American musician

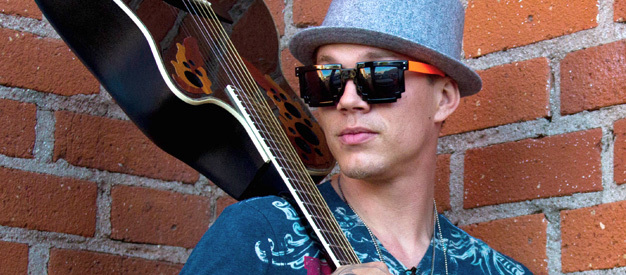
- Rene in 2012

Background information
- Genres: rock
- Occupation: Singer-songwriter
- Labels: Syco, Epic

Chris Rene is an American singer-songwriter. Rene auditioned for the first season of The X Factor USA with an original song entitled "Young Homie". He became the last contestant eliminated in the competition. "Young Homie" was released as a single on March 13, 2012; it was the lead single from Rene's EP I'm Right Here.

== Early life ==
Christopher Rene was born to Joan René (née Sampson) and Rafael Leon "Googie" René. His father was a songwriter and jazz pianist in the 1950s and 1960s. He has two brothers, Mike and Gabriel, and a sister, Gina. Gina is a singer featured on the Mean Girls and Step Up soundtracks, Gabriel is a record producer, and both are members of an electronica group called Soulstice. Rene's ethnicity is Creole, German, African-American, Native-American, and Swiss.

== Career ==
Rene released an independent album entitled Soul'd Out in 2009.

Rene wrote the song "Young Homie" prior to auditioning for the first season of the American version of singing talent competition The X Factor. He performed the song a total of three times on the show. Rene ultimately became the last contestant eliminated in the competition. On January 17, 2012, it was confirmed that Rene had signed with a joint venture between Syco and Epic Records. Rene's contract was reportedly worth $150,000 to $500,000.

"Young Homie" was released as a single on March 13, 2012. It was the lead single from Rene's EP I'm Right Here. The song debuted at number one on the New Zealand singles chart on March 19, 2012.

I'm Right Here was released on October 2, 2012 through Epic Records and Syco Music in physical and digital download formats.

Rene released an independent EP, "2020", on April 21, 2020.

=== Performances on The X Factor ===
Performance	Theme	Song choice	Original artist	Order	Result
Audition	Free choice	"Young Homie" (original composition)	Chris Rene	—N/a	Through to Bootcamp
Bootcamp 1	Judge's choice	"Sexual Healing"	Marvin Gaye	—N/a	Advanced
Bootcamp 2	Judge's choice	"What's Going On"	Marvin Gaye	—N/a	Advanced
Bootcamp 3	Auditioner's choice	"Every Breath You Take"	The Police	—N/a	Through to judges' houses
Judges' houses	Solo	"Everyday People"	Sly and the Family Stone	—N/a	Through to live shows
Week 1	—N/a	"Love Don't Live Here Anymore"	Rose Royce	2	Saved by L.A. Reid
Week 2	Judges' choice	"Superstar"	Delaney & Bonnie	2	Safe (7th)
Week 3	Songs from movies	"Gangsta's Paradise"	Coolio/L.V.; Dangerous Minds	10	Safe (7th)
Week 4	Rock	"No Woman, No Cry"/"Everythings's Gonna Be Alright"	Bob Marley & The Wailers/Sweetbox	3	Safe (5th)
Week 5	Giving Thanks	"Let It Be"/"Young Homie"	The Beatles/Chris Rene	4	Safe (5th)
Week 6	Michael Jackson	"I'll Be There"	The Jackson 5	6	Safe (3rd)
Week 7	Dance Music Hits	"Live Your Life	T.I./Rihanna	5	Safe (2nd)
Week 7	"Save Me" songs	"Where Do We Go from Here" (original composition)	Chris Rene	10	Safe (2nd)
Week 8	Pepsi Challenge songs	"Fly"	Sugar Ray	2	Safe (2nd)
Week 8	"Get Me to the Final" songs (no specific theme)	"No One"	Alicia Keys	6	Safe (2nd)
Final	Duet with invited guest	"Complicated"	Avril Lavigne	2	Eliminated (3rd)
Final	Audition song	"Young Homie" (original composition)	Chris Rene	5	Eliminated (3rd)
Final	Christmas songs	"Have Yourself a Merry Little Christmas"	Judy Garland	2	Eliminated (3rd)

== Personal life ==
Rene is a former drug addict and alcoholic. He revealed that he had undergone rehabilitation at Janus Rehabilitation Center of Santa Cruz and had been clean for only ten weeks before auditioning for The X Factor. Rene has said that his song "Young Homie" is "about learning how to be a grown-up. When you're young, you feel like there's no limit, no consequences to your actions. So it's me talking to my younger self and to all the young brothers out there, telling them that life's too beautiful to live like that".

== Discography ==
- Soul'd Out (2009)
- I'm Right Here (2012)
