= Saints and Sinners =

Saints and Sinners may refer to:

== Film and television ==
- Saints and Sinners (1916 film), a 1916 American film directed by James Kirkwood
- Saints and Sinners (1949 film), a 1949 film directed by Leslie Arliss
- Saints and Sinners (1994 film), starring Damian Chapa
- Saints and Sinners (1962 TV series), starring Nick Adams
- Saints & Sinners (2007 TV series), a MyNetworkTV telenovela
- Santos y pecadores (in Spanish, "Saints and sinners"), a 2013 Argentine miniseries
- Saints & Sinners (2016 TV series), a 2016 American television series

== Literature ==
- Saints and Sinners (short story collection), by Edna O'Brien
- Saints and Sinners Literary Festival, a literary festival, specializing in LGBT literature, held in New Orleans, Louisiana
- Saints and Sinners, an 1884 play by Henry Arthur Jones

== Music ==
- Saints & Sinners Festival, a hardcore and heavy metal music festival held in New Jersey

=== Albums ===
- Saints & Sinners (All Saints album)
- Saints & Sinners (Johnny Winter album)
- Saints & Sinners (Saints & Sinners album)
- Saints & Sinners (Whitesnake album)
- Saints and Sinners (Matt Maher album)
- Saints and Sinners (Kane Roberts album)
- Saint or Sinner, by Aggro Santos

=== Bands ===
- Saints & Sinners (jazz band), a jazz ensemble
- Saints & Sinners (heavy metal band), a Canadian hair metal band
- Saints or Sinners, former name of American rock band the Scream

=== Songs ===
- "Saints and Sinners" (song), by Godsmack on the album The Oracle
- "Saint and Sinner", by KISS from Creatures of the Night
- "Saints and Sinners", by Arch Enemy from Anthems of Rebellion
- "Saints and Sinners", by Flogging Molly from Speed of Darkness
- "Saints & Sinners", by Bullet for my Valentine from Temper Temper
- "Saints & Sinners" (Paddy Casey song), 2003

== Other uses ==
- The Walking Dead: Saints & Sinners, a virtual reality video game

== See also ==
- Saint Sinner (disambiguation)
- Sinners and Saints (disambiguation)
