= List of The X Factor (American TV series) finalists =

The X Factor is an American television music competition that first aired in 2011. As of December 2013, there have been three completed seasons. The final round of the competition features a number of solo singers or vocal groups: seventeen in season 1 and sixteen for season 2 and 3. A total of 49 acts have reached the finals of their season.

During the first season the contestants were split into four groups: "boys", "girls", "over 25s" and "groups". Each set of contestants was mentored by one of the show's judges, Simon Cowell, Paula Abdul, Nicole Scherzinger and L.A. Reid. In season 2, the "boys" and "girls" categories were scrapped and the "teens" and "young adults" categories were introduced. And the "over 25s" were still the same as season 1. Also in season 2, Abdul and Scherzinger left the show, leaving Cowell and Reid as the only two judges to return from the previous year. Cowell and Reid were joined on the panel by Demi Lovato and Britney Spears. In season 3, Reid and Spears left the show, Cowell and Lovato returned as judges from the previous year. Kelly Rowland and Paulina Rubio joined the panel as replacements of Reid and Spears. The "boys" and "girls" categories were reintroduced in season 3, replacing the "teens" and "young adults" categories from the previous year.

As of season 3, only three categories have won the show on at least one occasion, while two of the show's eight judges have had the winning act in their category at least once, with Cowell winning twice, and Reid winning on one occasion. The judges not to win were Abdul, Lovato, Rowland, Rubio, Scherzinger and Spears, with Abdul's best performance having her contestant being the fifth eliminated in 2011 (her only season), Scherzinger, Spears and Rowland placing runner-up in 2011, 2012 and 2013 respectively (their only season), Rubio having her contestant being the last eliminated place in 2013 (her only season) and Lovato reaching having her contestant being the twelfth eliminated in 2013 (the second of her two years on the panel).

== Contestants ==
– Winner
– Runner-up

Name	Season	Category	Mentor	Finished
Vino Alan	2	Over 25s	L.A. Reid	7th
Alex & Sierra	3	Groups	Simon Cowell	Winner
Melanie Amaro	1	Girls	Simon Cowell	Winner
Astro	1	Boys	L.A. Reid	7th
Simone Battle	1	Girls	Simon Cowell	13th (joint)
LeRoy Bell	1	Over 30s	Nicole Scherzinger	8th
The Brewer Boys	1	Groups	Paula Abdul	13th (joint)
Jason Brock	2	Over 25s	L.A. Reid	13th
Marcus Canty	1	Boys	L.A. Reid	4th
Khaya Cohen	3	Girls	Demi Lovato	10th
David Correy	2	Over 25s	L.A. Reid	14th (joint)
Rachel Crow	1	Girls	Simon Cowell	5th
Drew	1	Girls	Simon Cowell	6th
Emblem3	2	Groups	Simon Cowell	4th
Fifth Harmony (1432)	2	Groups	Simon Cowell	3rd
Stacy Francis	1	Over 30s	Nicole Scherzinger	10th
CeCe Frey	2	Young Adults	Demi Lovato	6th
Jennel Garcia	2	Young Adults	Demi Lovato	11th
Danie Geimer	3	Girls	Demi Lovato	14th (joint)
Carlos Guevara	3	Boys	Paulina Rubio	13th
Jeff Gutt	3	Over 25s	Kelly Rowland	Runner-up
Dexter Haygood	1	Over 30s	Nicole Scherzinger	13th (joint)
InTENsity	1	Groups	Paula Abdul	12th
Willie Jones	2	Young Adults	Demi Lovato	14th (joint)
James Kenney	3	Over 25s	Kelly Rowland	14th (joint)
Josh Krajcik	1	Over 30s	Nicole Scherzinger	Runner-up
Lakoda Rayne	1	Groups	Paula Abdul	9th
Josh Levi	3	Boys	Paulina Rubio	7th
Phillip Lomax	1	Boys	L.A. Reid	13th (joint)
LYRIC 145	2	Groups	Simon Cowell	12th
Lillie McCloud	3	Over 25s	Kelly Rowland	8th
Beatrice Miller	2	Teens	Britney Spears	9th
Carlito Olivero	3	Boys	Paulina Rubio	3rd
Tim Olstad	3	Boys	Paulina Rubio	9th
Rion Paige	3	Girls	Demi Lovato	5th
Rachel Potter	3	Over 25s	Kelly Rowland	11th
Arin Ray	2	Teens	Britney Spears	10th
Chris Rene	1	Boys	L.A. Reid	3rd
Restless Road	3	Groups	Simon Cowell	4th
RoXxy Montana	3	Groups	Simon Cowell	14th (joint)
Ellona Santiago	3	Girls	Demi Lovato	6th
Sister C	2	Groups	Simon Cowell	14th (joint)
Carly Rose Sonenclar	2	Teens	Britney Spears	Runner-up
The Stereo Hogzz	1	Groups	Paula Abdul	11th
Tate Stevens	2	Over 25s	L.A. Reid	Winner
Sweet Suspense	3	Groups	Simon Cowell	12th
Paige Thomas	2	Young Adults	Demi Lovato	8th
Tiah Tolliver	1	Girls	Simon Cowell	13th (joint)
Diamond White	2	Teens	Britney Spears	5th

- Melanie Amaro was previously eliminated at the judges house stage of the competition by her mentor Simon Cowell but he decided to bring her back to the live shows as he felt as though he had made a mistake in eliminating her. The first live show had a top 17 instead of a top 16. Cowell was the only judge that had to eliminate two acts instead of one. Resulting in there being a joint 13th for contestants Simone Battle, The Brewer Boys, Dexter Haygood, Phillip Lomax and Tiah Tolliver.
- Fifth Harmony were previously known as "LYLAS" during the judges' houses stage and "1432" on the first live show. They changed their name from LYLAS to 1432 on the first live show following pressure from The Lylas, another group consisting of Bruno Mars' sisters. However, the new name was criticized by L.A. Reid and Simon Cowell. They changed their name for the second time on the show to Fifth Harmony on the second live show.
- In 2012, four contestants were eliminated from the show following the first live show by the judges, without facing a public vote, so should be listed as finishing joint 13th. However, the following week, Diamond White, one of the four eliminated contestants was reinstated to the show as the judges felt that she shouldn't have been eliminated in the previous week. Hence, the rest of the eliminated contestants from the first live show–David Correy, Willie Jones and Sister C are classed as joint 14th.
- In 2013, four contestants were eliminated from the show following the first live show by the judges, without facing a public vote, so should be listed as finishing joint 13th. However, the following week, Josh Levi, one of the four eliminated contestants was reinstated to the show as the judges felt that he "deserves another shot". Hence, the rest of the eliminated contestants from the first live show–Danie Geimer, James Kenney and RoXxy Montana are classed as joint 14th.
