= Blood on the Bricks =

Blood on the Bricks may refer to:

- Blood on the Bricks (Iron City Houserockers album), 1981
- Blood on the Bricks (Aldo Nova album), 1991
  - "Blood on the Bricks" (song), a song from the album
