= Adventure Time (disambiguation) =

Adventure Time is an American animated television series that airs on Cartoon Network.

Adventure Time may also refer to:

- Adventure Time (1958 TV series), a children's television show in Pittsburgh
- Adventure Time (1967 TV series), a Canadian television series
- "Adventure Time" (short film), a 2007 pilot for the Cartoon Network series
- Adventure Time (franchise), a media franchise set around the Cartoon Network series
- Adventure Time (album), an album by the Elvis Brothers
- "Adventure Time", a 2003–2004 musical collaboration between Daedelus and DJ Frosty
