= Monkey on Your Back =

1983 single by Aldo Nova

Single by Aldo Nova

from the album Subject...Aldo Nova
- B-side: "Armageddon"
- Released: 1983
- Genre: Hard rock, heavy metal
- Label: Portrait
- Songwriter(s): Aldo Nova

Aldo Nova singles chronology
| "Foolin' Yourself" (1982) | "Monkey on Your Back" (1983) | "Blood on the Bricks" (1991) |

Monkey on Your Back is a single by the Canadian rock musician, Aldo Nova. Released from his album Subject...Aldo Nova in 1983, the song climbed to number 12 on Billboard magazine's Album Rock Tracks chart.

== Charts ==
| Chart (1983) | Peak position |
|---|---|
| US Mainstream Rock (Billboard) | 12 |
