= The Best of Aldo Nova =

Greatest hits album by Aldo Nova
- Released: Aug 22, 2006
- Genre: Rock
- Length: 60:45
- Label: Portrait
- Producer: Aldo Nova

Aldo Nova chronology
Nova's Dream (1997)	The Best of Aldo Nova (2006)	Under the Gun...A Portrait of Aldo Nova (2007)

Professional ratings
Review scores
Source	Rating
Allmusic	4.5/5 stars

The Best of Aldo Nova is a compilation album by Canadian rock musician Aldo Nova, released in 2006. It features songs from his first three albums.

== Track listing ==
All tracks composed by Aldo Nova; except where noted.

1. "Fantasy" - 5:05
2. "Foolin' Yourself" - 3:36
3. "Ball and Chain" - 4:03
4. "Hot Love" - 3:56
5. "You're My Love" - 3:35
6. "Monkey On Your Back" - 4:36
7. "Hey Operator" - 3:55
8. "Cry Baby Cry" - 4:18
9. "Victim of a Broken Heart" (Bruno, Nova) - 4:17
10. "Always Be Mine" - 4:12
11. "Tonight (Lift Me Up)" (DeLuca, Nova) - 4:14
12. "Rumours of You" - 4:56
13. "Heartless" (Hunter) - 3:17
14. "Fallen Angel" (Bradman, Nova) - 4:25
15. "Twitch" (Nova, Rudetsky) - 2:28
