= Aldo Nova (album) =

Studio album by Aldo Nova
- Released: January 18, 1982
- Recorded: 1981
- Studios: Bobinason Studios, Montreal, Canada and Kingdom Sound, Long Island, New York
- Genres: Hard rock; pop metal
- Length: 37:47
- Label: Portrait
- Producer: Aldo Nova

Aldo Nova chronology
Aldo Nova (1982)	Subject...Aldo Nova (1983)

Aldo Nova is the debut studio album by Canadian rock musician Aldo Nova. It was released on January 18, 1982. It reached number 8 on the Billboard 200 and was certified Gold by the Recording Industry Association of America (RIAA) on May 14, 1982, Platinum on February 14, 1989, and Double Platinum on December 5, 1994. Both of the singles released from the album charted on the Hot 100, "Foolin' Yourself" at No. 65 and "Fantasy" at No. 23.

Because he only had one top 40 hit in America, Aldo Nova is typically categorized as a one-hit wonder; for example, "Fantasy" was listed at No. 77 on VH1's list of the 100 greatest '80s one-hit wonders.

== Release, reception and legacy ==
Professional ratings
Review scores
Source	Rating
AllMusic	4.5/5 stars
Collector's Guide to Heavy Metal	5/10
Rolling Stone	1/5 stars

Released on April 1, 1982, to commercial success, this album stands as Nova's most commercially successful to date. After the album was released, Aldo purposely avoided the spotlight and tried to stay out of the public eye.

AllMusic's Bret Adams gave the album 4 and 1/2 stars and said that, "Aldo Nova doesn't get enough credit for helping invent the 1980s pop-metal genre, which focused equally on hard rocking anthems and soaring power ballads".

For the 35th anniversary of Aldo Nova's debut, he re-recorded 6 tracks of this album and gave it a more modern touch.

== Track listing ==
All songs written by Aldo Nova.

Side one

1. "Fantasy" – 5:05
2. "Hot Love" – 3:54
3. "It's Too Late" – 3:23
4. "Ball and Chain" – 4:01
5. "Heart to Heart" – 3:42

Side two

1. "Foolin' Yourself" – 3:35
2. "Under the Gun" – 3:47
3. "You're My Love" – 3:33
4. "Can't Stop Lovin' You" – 3:57
5. "See the Light" –3:56

Recent remastered/reissued versions of the album feature a demo of "Foolin' Yourself" as a bonus track.

== Personnel ==
- Aldo Nova - vocals, lead and rhythm guitars, bass guitar, keyboards, synthesizers
- Denis Chartrand - acoustic piano
- Michel Pelo, Roberto Biagioni - bass guitar
- Michael LaChapelle, Terry Martell - drums, percussion
- Daniel Barbe, Dwight Druck - backing vocals

Production

- Executive Producers: Lennie Petze, Val Azzoli
- Produced by Aldo Nova
- Recorded By Aldo Nova, Billy Szawlowski & Louis Mercier (at Bobinason Studios & Kingdom Sound)
- Mixed By Aldo Nova, Tony Bongiovi & Ray "We Don't Know What You Do" Willard (at The Power Station)
- Mastered by Bob Ludwig
- All Songs Published By ATV Music.

== Charts ==
Chart (1982–83)	Peak position
Canada Top Albums/CDs (RPM)	6
US Billboard 200	8

== Certifications ==
Region	Certification	Certified units/sales
Canada (Music Canada)	2× Platinum	200,000^{^}
United States (RIAA)	2× Platinum	2,000,000^{^}
^{^} Shipments figures based on certification alone.
