= Foolin' Yourself =

1982 single by Aldo Nova

Single by Aldo Nova

from the album Aldo Nova
- B-side: "Same"
- Released: 1982
- Genre: Rock
- Label: Portrait
- Songwriter: Aldo Nova
- Producer: Aldo Nova

Aldo Nova singles chronology
"Fantasy" (1982)	"Foolin' Yourself" (1982)	"Monkey on Your Back" (1983)

"Foolin' Yourself" is a single by the Canadian rock musician, Aldo Nova. Released on his eponymous debut album in 1982, the song climbed to #65 on the Billboard Hot 100 singles chart in the US.

== Charts ==
Chart (1982)	Peak position
Canada Top Singles (RPM)	45
US Billboard Hot 100	65
