= A Portrait of Aldo Nova =

Compilation album by Aldo Nova
- Released: August 13, 1991
- Genre: Rock
- Length: 73:44
- Label: Epic Legacy
- Producer: Aldo Nova

Aldo Nova chronology
Blood on the Bricks (1991)	A Portrait of Aldo Nova (1991)	Nova's Dream (1997)

Professional ratings
Review scores
Source	Rating
Allmusic	4.5/5 stars

A Portrait of Aldo Nova is a compilation album by Canadian rock musician Aldo Nova, released in 1991. It features songs from his first three albums.

== Track listing ==
1. "Fantasy"
2. "Hot Love"
3. "It's Too Late"
4. "Ball and Chain"
5. "Heart to Heart"
6. "Foolin' Yourself"
7. "Under the Gun"
8. "See the Light"
9. "Armageddon (Race Cars)"/"Armageddon"
10. "Monkey on Your Back"
11. "Hey Operator"
12. "Africa (Primal Love)"/"Hold Back the Night"
13. "All Night Long"
14. "Always Be Mine"
15. "Victim of a Broken Heart"
16. "Rumours of You"
17. "Tonight (Lift Me Up)"
18. "Lay Your Love On Me"
