= What About You =

What About You may refer to:

- "What About You", a song by Billy Preston from his album That's the Way God Planned It
- "What About You", a song by Lala Karmela from her album Stars

== See also ==
- What About Me (disambiguation)
