= Twitch (Aldo Nova album) =

Studio album by Aldo Nova
- Released: October 14, 1985
- Recorded: 6 March – 1 June 1985 (Kingdom Sound); 6 June – 25 July 1985 (The Hit Factory)
- Studios: Kingdom Sound and The Hit Factory, New York
- Genres: Hard rock; glam metal
- Length: 39:39
- Label: Portrait
- Producers: Aldo Nova, Lennie Petze

Aldo Nova chronology
Subject...Aldo Nova (1983)	Twitch (1985)	Blood on the Bricks (1991)

Professional ratings
Review scores
Source	Rating
AllMusic	2/5 stars
Collector's Guide to Heavy Metal	2/10

Twitch is the third studio album by Canadian hard rock musician Aldo Nova, released on October 14, 1985 by Portrait Records.

== Track listing ==
Credits adapted from the album liner notes.

Side one
No.	Title	Writer(s)	Length
1.	"Tonight (Lift Me Up)"	Aldo Nova, Tom De Luca	4:15
2.	"Rumours of You"	Nova	4:55
3.	"Surrender Your Heart"	Nova, De Luca	4:26
4.	"If Looks Could Kill"	Nova, Nicky Prigino, Rod McManus	3:49
5.	"Heartless"	Myles Hunter	3:19

Side two
No.	Title	Writer(s)	Length
6.	"Long Hot Summer"	Mark Radice	4:12
7.	"Fallen Angel"	Nova, Jesse Bradman	4:24
8.	"Stay"	Nova, De Luca	3:49
9.	"Lay Your Love on Me"	Nova, Paul Kayen	3:59
10.	"Twitch"	Nova, Michael Rudetsky	2:29

== Personnel ==
- Aldo Nova – guitar, vocals, synthesizer and Linn LM-1 programming, producer, arranger
- Paul Kayen – guitars
- Neil Jason – bass
- Anton Fig – drums on "Heartless"
- Billy Carmassi – drums on "Lay Your Love on Me"
- Allan Schwartzberg – drums on "Fallen Angel"
- Lennie Petze – special effects guitar on "Long Hot Summer", castanets on "Surrender Your Heart", co-producer
- Michael Rudetsky played and programmed the fairlight on "Long Hot Summer" and "Twitch"
- Robbie Kilgore – additional synthesizers on "Long Hot Summer"
- David LeBolt – additional keyboards on "Surrender Your Heart", "Fallen Angel" and "Stay"
- Peppy Castro – background vocals
- Michael Bolton – background vocals
- Bob Christianson – background vocals
- Angela Clemmons – background vocals on "Rumours of You", "Surrender Your Heart" and "If Looks Could Kill"
- Fiona – background vocals on "Rumours of You", "Surrender Your Heart" and "Lay Your Love on Me"

Production

- Brian McGee – engineer, mixing
- Joe Chiofalo – assistant engineer
- Michael Abbott – assistant engineer
- Dwight Druick – vocal coordination
- Tom Santorelli – head technician
- Robert Cohen – photography
- Marl Larson – design

== Charts ==
Chart (1985–86)	Peak position
Canada Top Albums/CDs (RPM)	60
Swedish Albums (Sverigetopplistan)	14
