= Now Dig This =

Studio album by The Elvis Brothers
- Released: 1992
- Recorded: Chicago Music Complex
- Genre: Rock/pop
- Length: 52:10
- Label: Recession
- Producer: Rob Elvis and Graham Elvis

The Elvis Brothers chronology
Adventure Time (1985)	Now Dig This (1992)

Singles from Adventure Time
- 1. "Motormouth" Released: 1992; 2. "Valentine" Released: 1992

Now Dig This is the third and last album by the rock/pop trio The Elvis Brothers. Released in 1992 by Recession Records, the album represented a return to the original line-up. The band had undergone some personnel changes and then broken up after being dropped by Portrait Records but they reunited to record this album and then re-issue their first two albums. The album was recorded at the Chicago Music Complex and was produced by Rob and Graham Elvis, with Jay O'Rourke of The Insiders handling the recording.

== Reception ==
- "Losing their major-label contract and spending the better part of a decade playing Chicago-area clubs without making a record didn't blow any of the fizz out of the band's sails: Now Dig This emerges from the same wellspring of spirited tunefulness. There's little evidence of the band's silly streak, but the best songs here are otherwise as appealing as any in the trio's past." (Ira Robbins)
- "Seven years after their unfortunate break-up, the Brothers returned in 1992, picking up right where they left off with a rootsy take on power pop. While this may not quite measure up to their first two albums, it's a welcome return and a quite a lot of fun." (Chris Woodstra, AllMusic)

== Track listing ==
1. Valentine
2. Ruthy Ann
3. Strangelove
4. Get Me Off This Ride
5. House That Jack Built
6. Next Time I Fall in Love
7. I've Got Skies for Her
8. It Coulda Been Me
9. Paris Can't Wait
10. Peace of Mind
11. Any Old Time
12. Black and White World
13. Motormouth

== Personnel ==
- Rob Elvis (Rob Newhouse) - guitar, vocals
- Graham Elvis (Graham Walker) - bass, vocals
- Brad Elvis (Brad Steakley) - drums
