= Movin' Up (album) =

Studio album by the Elvis Brothers
- Released: 1983
- Recorded: Power Station, New York City
- Genre: Rock/pop
- Length: 38:54
- Label: Portrait
- Producer: Lance Quinn, Tony Bonjovi

The Elvis Brothers chronology
| Movin' Up (1983) | Adventure Time (1985) |

Singles from Movin' Up
- 1. "Fire in the City" Released: 1983; 2. "Hidden in a Heartbeat" Released: 1983

Movin' Up is the debut album for the rock/pop trio the Elvis Brothers. The album was released in 1983 on Portrait Records. The album was recorded at the Power Station in New York City, and produced by Lance Quinn and Tony Bongiovi.

The album was reissued in 1995 by Sony/Recession Records with their second album Adventure Time, with both albums on a single CD.

== Reception ==
- Writing for AllMusic, Jim Worbois described the album as "a nice LP of light, enjoyable, pop songs."
- Renowned music critic Robert Christgau said "If you're really committed to the 'fun' only unpretentious pop can provide, you might as well go directly to these proud posers, who generate hooks in an abundance that will shame whatever 'authentic' locals you retain a sentimental yen for. Connoisseurs of pop plasticity will get an additional kick out of how affectlessly they shift from the usual ersatz teen romance to equally meaningless and equally commercial outlaw and rebel themes. Plus an uncanny Beatle impression on 'It's So Hard.' B− "
- Ira Robbins wrote: "Movin' Up traverses a panoply of mildly bent styles, from mock-Stray Cats ("Fire in the City") to Dave Edmunds-ish nostalgia ("Hey Tina") to Anglo-pop ("Hidden in a Heartbeat") to countryfied rock ("Santa Fe") and much more. Sure, they futz around a lot (especially onstage), but their silliness never interferes with the serious task of playing catchy pop with maximum gusto. It may not have meant a lot, but the first album is truly mega-fun."
- The Rolling Stone review said: "The band's debut LP is a twelve track instant party that's more fun than a garbage pail full of vodka and Gatorade."

== Tracks ==
1. (I Know You) Shake It
2. It's So Hard
3. Hidden in a Heartbeat
4. Hey Tina
5. Red Dress
6. Fire in the City
7. Here We Go Again
8. Movin' Up
9. Santa Fe
10. Full Speed Straight Ahead
11. You Got Me
12. Long Gone

== Personnel ==
- Rob Elvis (Rob Newhouse) - guitar, vocals
- Graham Elvis (Graham Walker) - bass, vocals
- Brad Elvis (Brad Steakley) - drums
- Bill Scheniman, Malcolm Pollack, Tony Bongiovi - engineers
- Lenny Petze - producer
