= Aldo Nova =

Canadian musician (born 1956)

Aldo Caporuscio (born November 13, 1956), known by the stage name Aldo Nova, is a Canadian hard rock musician. He gained recognition with his 1982 debut album Aldo Nova, which peaked at Billboard's number 8 position, and its accompanying single, "Fantasy", which reached number 23 on the US Billboard Hot 100 and boosted sales for its parent album. In 1997, he won a Grammy Award for Album of the Year as co-producer of Celine Dion's 1996 album Falling into You. He co-wrote four songs on the 2000 album Uno by La Ley, which won the Grammy Award for Best Latin Rock or Alternative Album.

== Early life ==
Nova was born in Montreal, Quebec, to Italian immigrant parents from a small village near Rome. He adopted the stage name Aldo Nova when he started playing guitar and keyboards at age 15.

== Career ==
=== 1980s–1990s ===
Signing with Portrait Records, Nova released a self-produced album Aldo Nova in 1982, that had two singles: "Fantasy" and "Foolin' Yourself". The Top 40 success of "Fantasy" led to Nova being listed as a one-hit wonder by VH1 in 2009.

Nova's second album Subject...Aldo Nova from 1983, had two singles: "Monkey on Your Back" and "Always Be Mine". His third album Twitch from 1985, had two singles: "Rumours of You" and "Tonite (Lift Me Up)".

Nova was displeased with the third album and the record company's insistence on making a more commercial album. After supporting the Twitch album, Nova's label refused to release him from his contract, and he stopped working with Portrait. In 1990, Aldo Nova wrote the main guitar riff used in the Jon Bon Jovi song, "Blaze of Glory". In 1991, to return the favour, Bon Jovi worked with Nova to release Blood on the Bricks on Bon Jovi's label Jambco Records. It had three singles: "Blood on the Bricks", "Medicine Man", and "Someday".

In addition, Nova produced some of Celine Dion's early albums. He co-wrote the hit song, "A New Day Has Come" for Dion, and has been featured playing guitar, synthesizer, and percussion on her records. He also wrote her songs "I Love You", "Your Light", "I Can't Fight the Feelin'", and "You and I" (which was used as Hillary Clinton's campaign song and as the Air Canada theme song). He co-wrote the Blue Öyster Cult song "Take Me Away" and was a member of the Guitar Orchestra of the State Of Imaginos on their album Imaginos.

In 1994, he brought his hard rock riffs, guitar solos, and energy to the French superstar Patrick Bruel on his album Bruel and on his 1995 tour, with great success.

In 1996, he received a Grammy Award as producer for Celine Dion's Falling into You for Album of the Year. In 1997, he released his own album Nova's Dream, which was seen as a return to his "signature" style of hard rock. He co-wrote the Latin Grammy nominated song "Aqui" for the Chilean rock group La Ley on the album Uno. He also co-wrote and co-produced four other tracks on that album, which won a Grammy for best Latin/Alternative/Rock Album.

As a songwriter, Nova's hits include Clay Aiken's "This Is The Night" (co-written with Chris Braide and Gary Burr), which in the US was a number 1 hit and the best-selling single of 2003. He wrote one and co-wrote more songs on Dion's Taking Chances album.

=== 2000s–present ===
In 2003, Nova received an International Achievement Award at the SOCAN Awards in Toronto for co-writing the Dion song "A New Day Has Come".

In early 2019, Nova announced to Loudwire that he would release a rock opera in June 2020 under the name The Life and Times of Eddie Gage. He had been working on the album from 2008. The release was delayed, eventually coming out in the smaller EP format on 1 April 2022.

== Discography ==
=== Studio albums ===
- Aldo Nova (1982) No. 8 US 2× Platinum
- Subject...Aldo Nova (1983) No. 56 US Gold & Canada Platinum
- Twitch (1985) Canada Gold
- Blood on the Bricks (1991) No. 124 US
- Nova's Dream (1997)
- The Life and Times of Eddie Gage – A Rock Opera – 10-song EP – A Little Preview (EP) (2022)
- 2.0 Reloaded (2022)
- Short Stories (EP) (2022)
- Sonic Hallucinations (EP) (2022)

=== Compilations ===
- A Portrait of Aldo Nova (1991)
- The Best of Aldo Nova (2006)
- Under the Gun...A Portrait of Aldo Nova (2007)

=== Singles ===
Year	Title	Chart Positions			Album
Year	Title	CAN	US	US Main	Album
1982	"Fantasy"	14	23	3	Aldo Nova
1982	"Foolin' Yourself"	45	65	—	Aldo Nova
1983	"Monkey on Your Back"	—	—	12	Subject
1983	"Always Be Mine"	—	107	—	Subject
1985	"Tonight (Lift Me Up)"	—	—	—	Twitch
1985	"Rumours Of You"	—	—	—	Twitch
1991	"Blood on the Bricks"	65	—	14	Blood on the Bricks
1991	"Someday"	45	—	—	Blood on the Bricks
1991	"Medicine Man"	—	—	43	Blood on the Bricks
2018
2018	"Fantasy 2.0"	—	—	—	Aldo Nova 2.0
2019	"I'm a Survivor"	—	—	—	Aldo Nova 2.0

=== Songwriter/producer ===
Artist	Title	Year	
Blue Öyster Cult	"Take Me Away"	1983	Music/Lyrics
Nicole McCloud	"Don't You Want My Love"	1985	Music/Lyrics
Beau Geste	"No More Heroes"	1986	Music/Lyrics
Celine Dion	"Partout Je Te Vois"	1987	Music/Lyrics
Celine Dion	"Have a Heart"	1990	Music/Lyrics
Celine Dion	"Des Mots Qui Sonnent"	1991	
Celine Dion	"Dreamin' of You"	1996	Music/Lyrics/Producer
Celine Dion	"I Love You"	1996	Music/Lyrics
Celine Dion	"Your Light"	1996	Music/Lyrics/Producer
Saints & Sinners	Saints & Sinners	1992	Music/Lyrics/Producer
Éric Lapointe	"L'école du Rock'n'roll"	1994	Music/Lyrics/Producer
Éric Lapointe	"Terre Promise"	1994	Music/Lyrics/Producer
Éric Lapointe	"N'importe quoi"	1994	Music/Lyrics/Producer
Éric Lapointe	"Hypocrite"	1994	
Jetsam	"Drive"	1997	
Faith Hill	"I Love You"	1998	
Jon Bon Jovi	"Mister Big Time"	1998	
Garou	"Au Plaisir De Ton Corps"	2000	Music/Lyrics
Garou	"Le Monde Est Stone"	2001	Producer
Celine Dion	"A New Day Has Come"	2002	Music/Lyrics/Producer
Chenoa	"Una Mujer (I'm A Woman)"	2002	Music/Lyrics
Clay Aiken	"This Is The Night"	2003	Music/Lyrics
Garou	"L'aveu"	2004	Producer
Garou	"Pour L'amour D'une Femme"	2004	Music/Lyrics/Producer
Celine Dion	"You and I"	2004	Music/Lyrics/Producer
Agnes Carlsson	"I Believe"	2005	Music/Lyrics
Marilou Bourdon	"Le Coeur De Mon Coeur"	2005	Music/Lyrics/Producer
Garou	"Que Le Temps"	2006	Producer
Garou	"Trahison"	2006	Producer
Celine Dion	"A Song For You"	2007	Music/Lyrics
Celine Dion	"Can't Fight The Feelin'"	2007	Music/Lyrics
Celine Dion	"Fade Away"	2007	Music/Lyrics
Celine Dion	"Shadow Of Love"	2007	Music/Lyrics

== Tours ==
- Fantasy Tour (1982–1983)
- Subject Tour (1983–1984)
- Blood on the Bricks Tour (1991)

== See also ==
- Canadian rock
- List of Canadian musicians
- List of bands from Canada
