= Blood on the Bricks (song) =

1991 single by Aldo Nova

Single by Aldo Nova

from the album Blood on the Bricks
- Released: 1991
- Genre: Rock
- Label: Jambco
- Songwriters: Aldo Nova & Jon Bon Jovi

Aldo Nova singles chronology
"Monkey on Your Back" (1983)	"Blood on the Bricks" (1991)

"Blood on the Bricks" is a single by the Canadian rock musician, Aldo Nova. Released on his album Blood on the Bricks in 1991, the song climbed to #14 on Billboard magazine's Mainstream Rock chart. It was co-written by Jon Bon Jovi.

== Charts ==
Chart (1991)	Peak position
Canada Top Singles (RPM)	67
US Mainstream Rock (Billboard)	14
