= Nova's Dream =

Studio album by Aldo Nova
- Released: November 18, 1997
- Studio: Asylum Recording Studios
- Genres: Rock, Progressive Rock, Hard rock
- Length: 62:04
- Label: BMG Canada
- Producer: Aldo Nova

Aldo Nova chronology
A Portrait of Aldo Nova (1991)	Nova's Dream (1997)	The Best of Aldo Nova (2006)

Professional ratings
Review scores
Source	Rating
Allmusic	2.5/5 stars

Nova's Dream is the fifth studio album by Canadian Rock musician Aldo Nova, released on November 18, 1997. It is a Rock, Prog Rock, Hard rock and electronic album with some vocal effects and a variety of choirs.

== Track listing ==
All songs written by Aldo Nova

1. "My Soul to Keep" – :55
2. "Is There Anybody There?" – 3:35
3. "Dreamwalk" – 4:01
4. "Are You Inexperienced?" – 1:46
5. "Excuse Me While I Scream!!!" – 6:30
6. "The Pressure's Killing Me" – 1:01
7. "Pressure Cooker" – 4:53
8. "Falling Back/An Angel Whispered" – 4:32
9. "Freedom" – 9:18
10. "Where Am I Now?" – :22
11. "Elaye" – 5:57
12. "Dada" – :06
13. "Coming Home" – 4:39
14. "Lighting Up" – :09
15. "Mary Jane" – 1:51
16. "Carlito's Way" – 5:18
17. "Wake Up!!!" – 1:02
18. "The End" – 6:19

== Production ==
- Produced By: Aldo Nova
- Engineered By: Aldo Nova
- Mixed By: Jeff Nystrom
- Coordinated By: Bob Telaro

== Personnel ==
- Aldo Nova - vocals, lead and rhythm guitars, bass guitar, keyboards, synthesizers
- Dennis Chartrand - synthesizer, strings, keyboards, accordion
- Jeff Smallwood - guitar
- Tino Izzo - acoustic guitar
- Sylvain Bolduc - bass, fretless bass
- Andre Proulx - violin
- Voices of Africa - backing vocals
- Violaine Corradi - backing vocals
- Nancy Martinez - backing vocals
