= Hawaiian Pups =

The Hawaiian Pups were a new wave/synthpop music group from the 1980s which formed in the New York Metropolitan Area. Portrait Records signed them onto their record label. Spook Opera was their first single. In 1983, they released an EP by the name of Split Second Precision, which included the song Young Boys. Another notable release was the song Baby Judy.

== Band members ==
- John Terelle
- John Klett
- Tara Shanahan

== Releases ==
- Split Second Precision - EP [Portrait 1983]
- "Infinite Roads"
- "Trash"
- "Young Boys"
- "Baby Judy"
- "Baby Judy (Extended Version)"
- "Overture to Young Boys".

== Singles ==
- Spook Opera - Halloween '82 Radio Promo - SINGLE 7" (Portrait 1982)
- "Spook Opera"
