= Metalized =

Studio album by Sword
- Released: August 1986
- Genre: Heavy metal
- Length: 34:37
- Label: Aquarius
- Producer: Pierre Paradis & Sword

Sword chronology
Metalized (1986)	Sweet Dreams (1988)

Professional ratings
Review scores
Source	Rating
Allmusic	4/5 stars
Kerrang!	4.5/5 stars

Metalized is the debut album by the Canadian heavy metal band Sword, released in 1986 by the indie label Aquarius Records.

== Track listing ==
1. "F.T.W." – 3:38 – (Music: Rick Hughes / Mike Plant / M Larock / D Hughes) (Lyrics: Rick Hughes / Derek Rodrigues)
2. "Children of Heaven" – 2:38 – (Music: R Hughes / M Plant / M Larock / D Hughes) (Lyrics: R Hughes / M Plant / Derek Rodrigues)
3. "Stoned Again" – 3:27 – (Music: Rick Hughes / Mike Plant / Mike Larock / Dan Hughes) (Lyrics: Rick Hughes / Derek Rodrigues)
4. "Dare to Spit" – 3:45 – (Music: Rick Hughes / Mike Plant / Mike Larock / Dan Hughes) (Lyrics: Rick Hughes / Derek Rodrigues)
5. "Outta Control" – 3:00 – (Music: Rick Hughes / Mike Plant / Mike Larock / Dan Hughes) (Lyrics: Rick Hughes)
6. "The End of the Night" – 3:00 – (Music: Rick Hughes / Mike Plant / Mike Larock / Dan Hughes) (Lyrics : Rick Hughes)
7. "Runaway" – 3:38 – (Music: Rick Hughes / Mike Plant / Mike Larock / Dan Hughes) (Lyrics: Rick Hughes)
8. "Where to Hide" – 3:43 – (Music: Rick Hughes / Mike Plant / Mike Larock / Dan Hughes) (Lyrics: Rick Hughes)
9. "Stuck in Rock" – 3:37 – (Music: R Hughes / M Plant / M Larock / D Hughes) (Lyrics: R Hughes / M Plant / D Rodrigues)
10. "Evil Spell" – 4:14 – (Music: Rick Hughes / Mike Plant / Mike Larock / Dan Hughes (Lyrics: Rick Hughes / Derek Rodrigues)

== Personnel ==
- Rick Hughes – vocals, keyboards
- Mike Plant – guitar, keyboards
- Mike Larock – bass
- Dan Hughes – drums

== Production ==
- Pierre Paradis – producer
- Sword – producer
- Joe Primeau – engineer
- Billy Szawlowski – engineer
- Gary Moffet – engineer
- Garth Richardson – assistant engineer
- James "Cowboy" Carrier – assistant engineer
- Paul Gross – coordination
- Bob Lemm – graphic design
- Jacques Larue – illustrations
- Marc Bélanger – photography
