= Sweet Dreams (Sword album) =

Studio album by Sword
- Released: February 1 1988
- Genre: Heavy metal
- Length: 41:31
- Label: Aquarius
- Producer: Garth Richardson, Jack Richardson

Sword chronology
Metalized (1986)	Sweet Dreams (1988)	The Best of Sword (2006)

Professional ratings
Review scores
Source	Rating
Allmusic	3/5 stars

Sweet Dreams is the second album by the Canadian heavy metal band Sword, released in 1988 by Aquarius Records.

== Track listing ==
No.	Title	Writer(s)	Length
1.	"Sweet Dreams"	Rick Hughes, Mike Plant	5:08
2.	"Trouble Is"	Hughes, Plant, Mike Larock, Dan Hughes	3:33
3.	"Land of the Brave"	Rick Hughes, Larock	5:28
4.	"Back Off"	Rick Hughes, Plant	3:53
5.	"Prepare to Die"	Rick Hughes, Larock, Plant	2:58
6.	"Caught in the Act"	Hughes, Hughes, Larock, Plant	4:09
7.	"Until Death Do Us Part"	Hughes, Larock, Plant, Hughes	3:36
8.	"The Threat"	Hughes, Plant, Larock, Hughes	4:10
9.	"Life on the Sharp Edge"	Hughes, Plant, Hughes	4:44
10.	"State of Shock"	Rick Hughes, Plant, Larock	3:43

== Personnel ==
- Rick Hughes - Vocals, Keyboards
- Mike Plant - Guitar, Keyboards
- Mike Larock - Bass
- Dan Hughes - Drums

== Production ==
- Sword - Producer
- Jack Richardson - Producer
- Garth Richardson - Producer, Engineer
- Renée Marc-Aurèle - Assistant Engineer
- Bill Kennedy - Mixing
- George Marino - Mastering
- George Chin - Photography
