= What About Me =

What About Me may refer to:

- What About Me (film), a 1993 film featuring Richard Hell

== Albums ==
- What About Me? (1 Giant Leap album), 2009
- What About Me (Anne Murray album), 1968
- What About Me? (Kenny Rogers album), 1984
- What About Me (Quicksilver Messenger Service album), 1970, or the title song
- What About Me? (Nicole album), 1986

=== Songs ===
- "What About Me" (Anne Murray song), 1973
- "What About Me?" (Kenny Rogers song), 1984
- "What About Me" (Moving Pictures song), 1982, also covered by Shannon Noll
- "What About Me" (Haddaway song), 1997
- "What About Me?", a song by Emily Osment from her debut EP, All the Right Wrongs
- "What About Me", a song by Cascada from Evacuate the Dancefloor
- "What About Me", a song by The Cribs from The Cribs (album)
- "What About Me", a song by Lil Wayne from Tha Carter V
- "What About Me", a song by Finnish singer Isac Elliot
- "What About Me?", a song by Snarky Puppy from We Like It Here
