= Fantasy (Aldo Nova song) =

Single by Aldo Nova

from the album Aldo Nova
- B-side: "Under the Gun"
- Released: 1982
- Recorded: 1981, North America
- Genre: Arena rock; hard rock; pop metal
- Length: 5:05 (album version); 6:14 (extended version); 3:58 (single version)
- Label: Portrait
- Songwriter: Aldo Nova
- Producer: Aldo Nova

Aldo Nova singles chronology
"Fantasy" (1982)	"Foolin' Yourself" (1982)

Music video
- "Fantasy" on YouTube

"Fantasy" is the debut single by Canadian rock musician Aldo Nova, released in 1982 from his self-titled debut album. VH1 listed the song at number 78 on its countdown for the "100 Greatest One Hit Wonders of the 80s". It is his most popular work to date. The song is considered one of earliest examples of the hair metal or glam metal genre of rock music, which would rise to high popularity by the mid to late 1980s.

== Music video ==
The video portrays Nova performing with his band for an audience. In its opening sequence, a man holding a Gibson Les Paul guitar and two bodyguards holding machine guns wait for someone. The men surround a landing helicopter, and the one with the guitar opens the door. Nova exits the helicopter, clad in a leopard-print jumpsuit and a pair of cowboy boots, and is escorted to the stage. When they encounter a locked door, Nova takes the guitar, holds it like a rifle, and fires a laser beam into the door, forcing it open. Once inside, Nova leaps on stage where he and his band perform the song. Notably, the version played in the music video is much lower quality than the actual track.

== Charts ==
Chart (1982–1983)	Peak position
Canada Top Singles (RPM)	14
US Billboard Hot 100	23
US Mainstream Rock (Billboard)	3

== Uses in Media ==
From 2009 to 2025, "Fantasy" was used as a secret song on Hollywood Rip Ride Rockit. Its code was 109.
