= The X Factor (American TV series) season 3 =

The X Factor
- Season 3
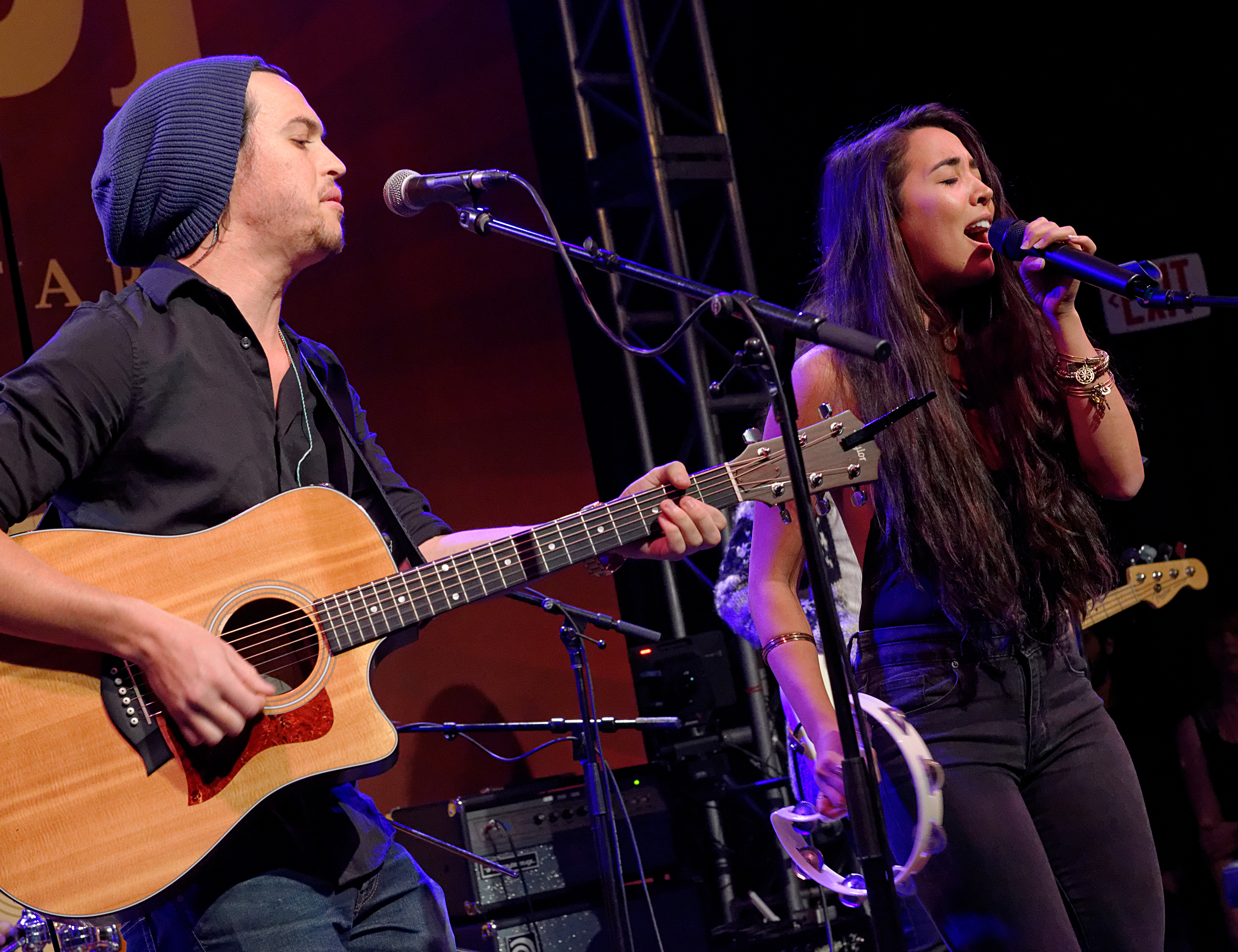
- Hosted by: Mario Lopez
- Judges: Demi Lovato; Simon Cowell; Paulina Rubio; Kelly Rowland
- Winner: Alex & Sierra
- Winning mentor: Simon Cowell
- Runner-up: Jeff Gutt

Release
- Original network: Fox
- Original release: September 11 – December 19, 2013

Season chronology
- ← Previous; Season 2

The third and final season of the American music competition television show The X Factor premiered on Fox on September 11, 2013, and ended on December 19, 2013. This season was hosted by Mario Lopez. Simon Cowell and Demi Lovato returned to the judging panel, while Kelly Rowland and Paulina Rubio joined the panel as replacements for the departing judges.

Producer auditions began on March 6, 2013, in Los Angeles, and ended on May 4, 2013, in Denver. The judges auditions, which are televised, began on May 21, 2013, in Charleston, and ended on July 12, 2013, in Los Angeles. New for this season is the removal of the boot camp and judges' houses rounds of the competition which have been replaced with a new middle section, more reminiscent of the live shows.

On December 19, 2013, Alex & Sierra won the show, as mentored by Cowell. On February 7, 2014, Cowell announced he was returning to the British show to judge the 2014 British series, which was followed by Fox announcing that they would not be renewing the show for a fourth season.

Alex and Sierra's victory on X Factor, along with three other wins: Candice Glover won American Idol season 12, Danielle Bradbery won season 4 of The Voice USA, Tessanne Chin won season 5 of The Voice USA, making those victories a quadruple for female artists, remained the last time that a female artist had won a season in any major singing competition in North America (USA, Canada, and Mexico), excluding Got Talent franchises, until Alisan Porter won season 10 of The Voice USA in May 2016.

== Judges and hosts ==
Judges and Host for The X Factor Season 3

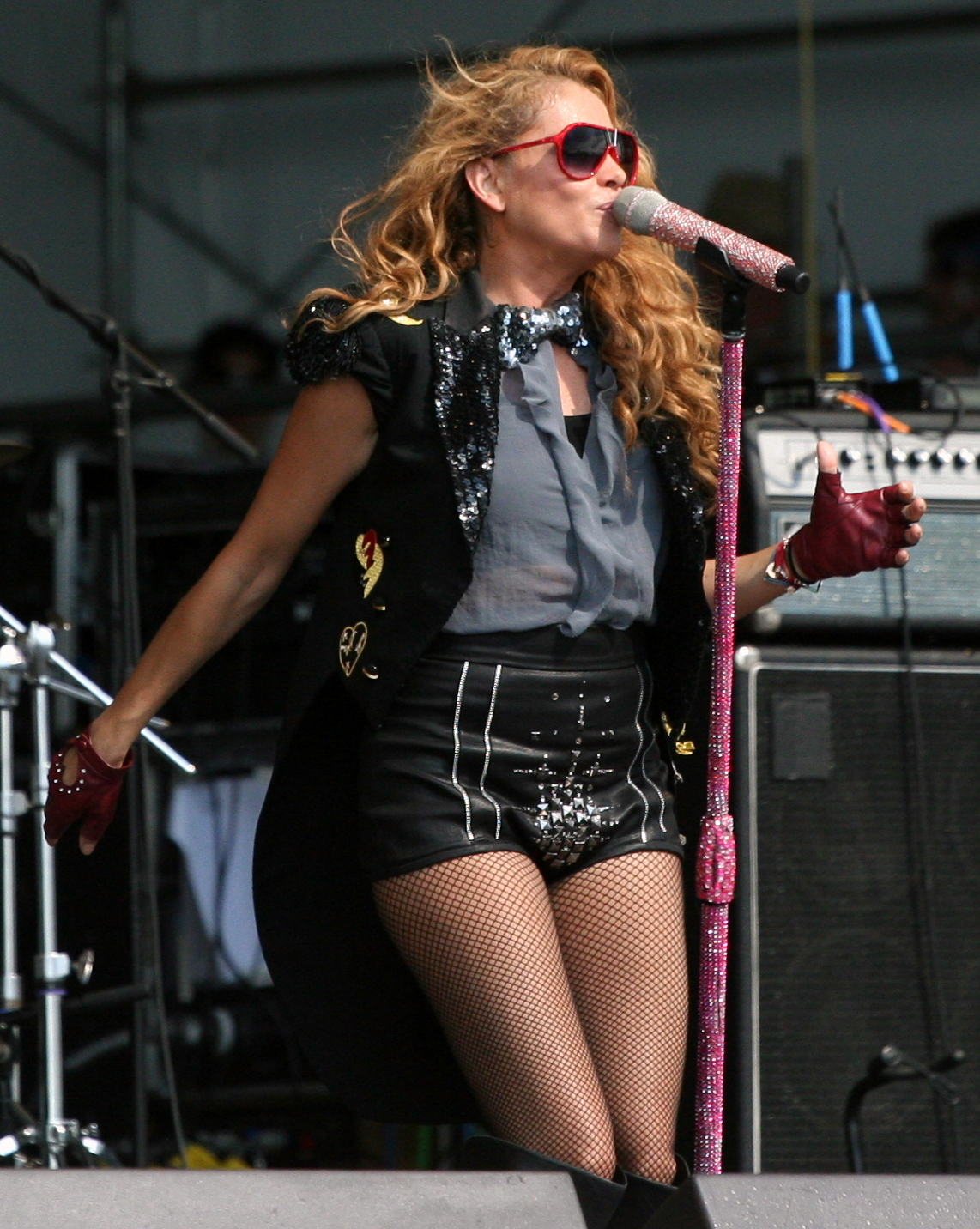
Paulina Rubio

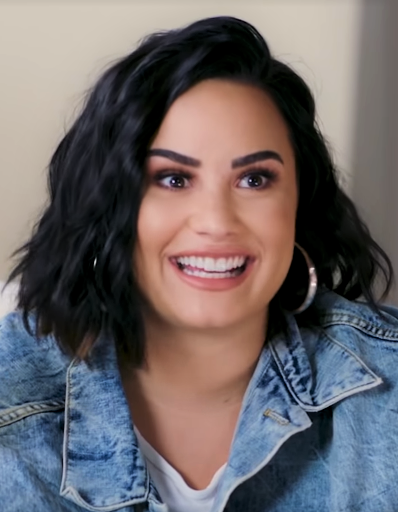
Demi Lovato

Simon Cowell

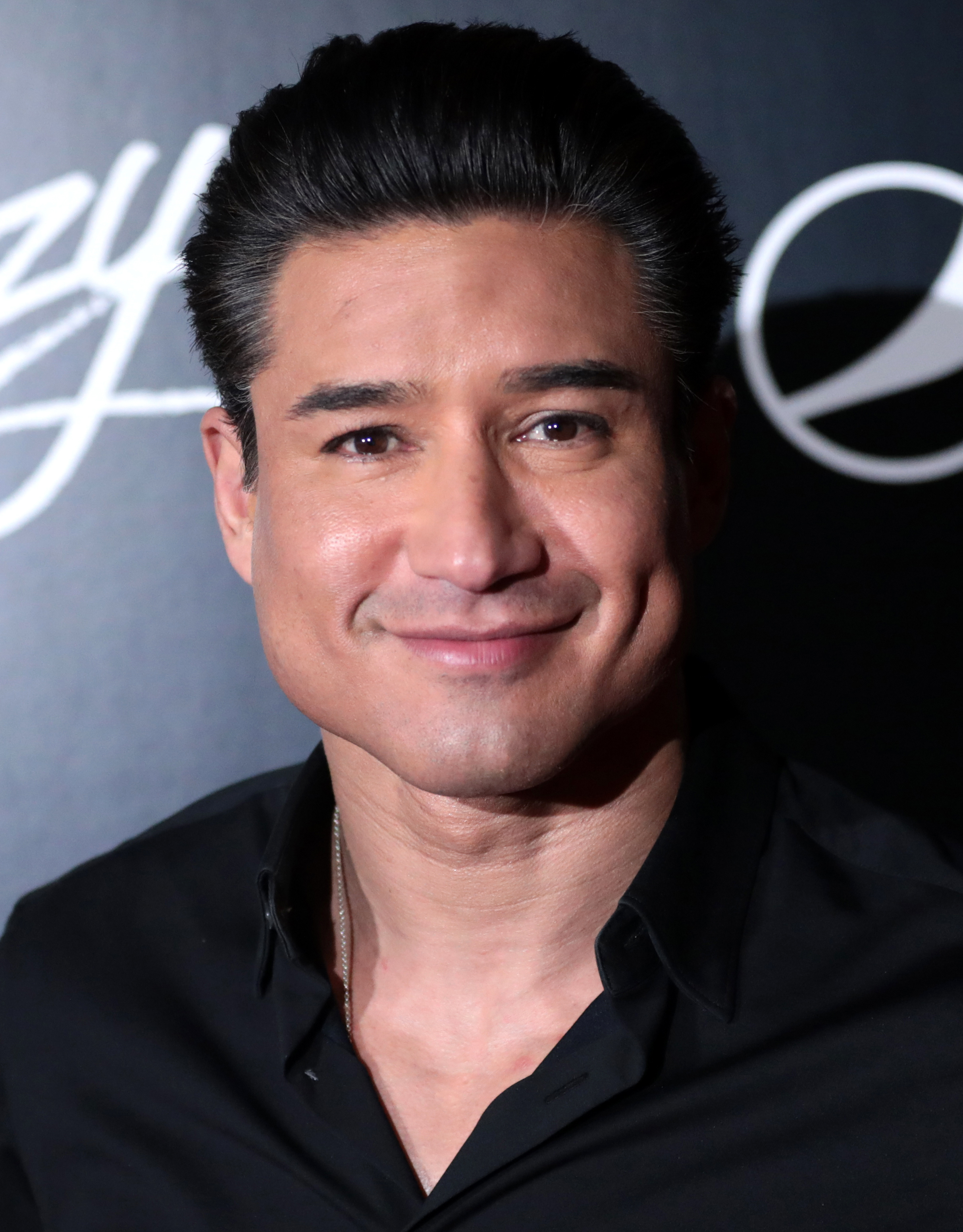
Mario Lopez

On October 22, 2012, it was announced that The X Factor would be returning for a third season, with Simon Cowell confirmed to be returning. On December 14, 2012, L.A. Reid announced he would not return to the show for its third season, as he wished to refocus his work on his record company, Epic Records. Britney Spears stated her intentions on returning to the show for its third season, but she eventually did not return, in order to focus on her music career.

Following the conclusion of season two, Demi Lovato questioned whether she would return for another season, or instead focus on her own career as a performer, stating, "I have no idea what's gonna happen next season, and I don't think anybody does." On March 28, 2013, it was confirmed that Lovato would return. On April 22, it was confirmed by Fox that Mario Lopez would be returning to host season three, along with the news of Khloé Kardashian not returning as co-host.

Rumors passed that Reba McEntire and Jennifer Love Hewitt would be judges.

Eventually, Cowell confirmed via his Twitter account that the full judging panel would be announced on May 20, 2013, with auditions beginning the next day. On that same day, Fox confirmed that Destiny's Child member and judge on the 2011 series of the UK show (who previously replaced Dannii Minogue), Kelly Rowland, and Mexican singer and former La Voz... México judge Paulina Rubio had been hired to replace Reid and Spears.

== Selection process ==
=== Auditions ===
Cities where auditions were held.

In addition to having online auditions, it was announced at the conclusion of season 2 that auditions for season 3 would be held throughout the country in Charleston, South Carolina; Denver, Colorado; Long Island, New York; Los Angeles, California and New Orleans, Louisiana. On the "Registration and Audition Rules" document on The X Factor's website about the auditions, it was announced where the auditions were going to be taking place.

Summary of judges' auditions
City	Auditions dates	Venue	Judges			
Charleston, South Carolina	May 21–22, 2013	North Charleston Coliseum	Rowland	Lovato	Rubio	Cowell
New Orleans, Louisiana	June 11–12, 2013	Lakefront Arena	Rowland	Lovato	Rubio	Cowell
Long Island, New York	June 19–21, 2013	Nassau Coliseum	Rowland	Lovato	Rubio	Cowell
Denver, Colorado	June 30 – July 2, 2013	Denver Coliseum	Rowland	Lovato	Rubio	Cowell
Los Angeles, California	July 10–11, 2013	Galen Center	Rowland	Lovato	Rubio	Cowell
Los Angeles, California	July 12, 2013	Galen Center	Rowland	Lovato	—N/a	Cowell

=== Deliberations ===
Instead of the traditional bootcamp stages, a deliberation stage (very similar to Britain's Got Talent) was introduced to cut down the "yes" from the auditions to perform at Four-chair challenge. The judges cut the acts from 218 to 40. This took place on July 31, 2013.

After the Deliberation and Reveal Stages, but before the start of the four-chair challenge, the judges found out their categories and they are as follows: Rowland has the Overs, Rubio has the Boys, Lovato has the Girls and Cowell has the groups. They were revealed at Shrine Auditorium.

=== Four-chair challenge ===
For this season of The X Factor, Cowell confirmed that the boot camp and judges' houses sections of the competition, which traditionally followed the audition rounds, had been dropped and replaced with a brand new stage called "The Four-Chair challenge", which took place at the Shrine Auditorium and was filmed over 2 days in September 2013. Speaking on the change, he said "It [boot camp and Judges' houses] was the one element of the show I wasn't happy with, and it looked too similar to what everybody else is doing." He went on to describe the new "middle section" as "really dramatic, very tough on us and the contestants, and very high pressure", and compared the new round as similar to the live shows.

This season, the categories did not follow the age-based format from season two but rather the format from season one: Boys, Girls, Over 25s and Groups. Rowland mentored Over 25s, Lovato the Girls, Rubio the Boys, and for the second season in a row, Cowell mentored the Groups. Groups Restless Road, Sweet Suspense, and Forever in Your Mind all consist of contestants who originally auditioned as soloists.

The four-chair challenge episodes were broadcast on two 2-hour Wednesdays and two 1-hour Thursdays shows on October 2, 3, 9 and 10.

Key:

– Act was immediately eliminated after performance without switch
– Act was switched out later in the competition and eventually eliminated
– Act was not switched out and made the final four of their own category

Contestants performances on the four-chair challenge
Episode	Category (mentor)	Act	Order	Song	Mentor's decision	Switched with
Episode 7 (October 2)	Over 25s (Rowland)	Victoria Carriger	1	"Make You Feel My Love"	Put in chair 1	—
Episode 7 (October 2)	Over 25s (Rowland)	Kristine Mirelle	2	"Oops!... I Did It Again"	Put in chair 2	—
Episode 7 (October 2)	Over 25s (Rowland)	Jeff Gutt	3	"Amazing Grace"	Put in chair 3	—
Episode 7 (October 2)	Over 25s (Rowland)	Rachel Potter	4	"Irreplaceable"	Put in chair 4	—
Episode 7 (October 2)	Over 25s (Rowland)	Lorie Moore	5	"I'll Make Love to You"	Put in chair 2	Kristine Mirelle
Episode 7 (October 2)	Over 25s (Rowland)	Allison Davis	6	"Tik Tok" / "Push It"	Eliminated	—
Episode 7 (October 2)	Over 25s (Rowland)	Jeff Brinkman	7	"Without You"	Put in chair 1	Victoria Carriger
Episode 7 (October 2)	Over 25s (Rowland)	Denny Smith	8	"In the Midnight Hour"	Eliminated	—
Episode 7 (October 2)	Over 25s (Rowland)	James Kenney	9	"Lean on Me"	Put in chair 1	Jeff Brinkman
Episode 7 (October 2)	Over 25s (Rowland)	Lillie McCloud	10	"A House Is Not a Home"	Put in chair 2	Lorie Moore
Episode 7 (October 2)	Girls (Lovato)	Bree Randall	11	"Glad You Came"	Put in chair 1	—
Episode 7 (October 2)	Girls (Lovato)	Khaya Cohen	12	"Locked Out of Heaven"	Put in chair 2	—
Episode 7 (October 2)	Girls (Lovato)	Jamie Pineda	13	"Don't Speak"	Put in chair 3	—
Episode 7 (October 2)	Girls (Lovato)	Ashly Williams	14	"I Don't Want to Miss a Thing"	Put in chair 4	—
Episode 8 (October 3)	Girls (Lovato)	Simone Torres	15	"A Change Is Gonna Come"	Put in chair 1	Bree Randall
Episode 8 (October 3)	Girls (Lovato)	Danie Geimer	16	"Georgia on My Mind"	Put in chair 1	Simone Torres
Episode 8 (October 3)	Girls (Lovato)	Rylie Brown	17	"Angels"	Eliminated	—
Episode 8 (October 3)	Girls (Lovato)	Primrose Martin	18	"Blame It on the Boogie"	Eliminated	—
Episode 8 (October 3)	Girls (Lovato)	Rion Paige	19	"I Won't Let Go"	Put in chair 4	Ashly Williams
Episode 8 (October 3)	Girls (Lovato)	Ellona Santiago	20	"Clarity"	Put in chair 3	Jamie Pineda
Episode 9 (October 9)	Boys (Rubio)	Al Calderon	21	"Call Me Maybe"	Put in chair 1	—
Episode 9 (October 9)	Boys (Rubio)	Isaiah Alston	22	"The Greatest Love of All"	Eliminated	—
Episode 9 (October 9)	Boys (Rubio)	Isaac Tauaefa	23	"Bubbly"	Eliminated	—
Episode 9 (October 9)	Boys (Rubio)	Carlos Guevara	24	"Ain't No Sunshine"	Put in chair 2	—
Episode 9 (October 9)	Boys (Rubio)	Stone Martin	25	"Torn"	Put in chair 3	—
Episode 9 (October 9)	Boys (Rubio)	Chase Goehring	26	"Airplanes"	Put in chair 4	—
Episode 9 (October 9)	Boys (Rubio)	Tim Olstad	27	"The Climb"	Put in chair 3	Stone Martin
Episode 9 (October 9)	Boys (Rubio)	Carlito Olivero	28	"Dreaming of You"	Put in chair 4	Chase Goehring
Episode 9 (October 9)	Boys (Rubio)	Timmy Thames	29	"The New Girl in Town"	Put in chair 3	Tim Olstad
Episode 9 (October 9)	Boys (Rubio)	Tim Olstad	N/A	N/A (reinstated by mentor)^{1}	Put in chair 1	Al Calderon
Episode 9 (October 9)	Boys (Rubio)	Josh Levi	30	"I Can't Make You Love Me"	Put in chair 3	Timmy Thames
Episode 9 (October 9)	Groups (Cowell)	Girls United	31	"Yeah 3x"	Put in chair 1	—
Episode 9 (October 9)	Groups (Cowell)	Wild Thingz	32	"Party Rock Anthem"	Put in chair 2	—
Episode 9 (October 9)	Groups (Cowell)	Glamour	33	"When I'm Gone"	Put in chair 3	—
Episode 9 (October 9)	Groups (Cowell)	Restless Road	34	"Somebody Like You"	Put in chair 4	—
Episode 10 (October 10)	Groups (Cowell)	Sweet Suspense	35	"Wishing on a Star"	Put in chair 2	Wild Thingz
Episode 10 (October 10)	Groups (Cowell)	Yellow House Canyon	36	"Hell on Heels"	Eliminated	—
Episode 10 (October 10)	Groups (Cowell)	Forever in Your Mind	37	"Lovebug"	Put in chair 3	Glamour
Episode 10 (October 10)	Groups (Cowell)	Good News	38	"Landslide"	Eliminated	—
Episode 10 (October 10)	Groups (Cowell)	Alex & Sierra	39	"You're the One That I Want"	Put in chair 1	Girls United
Episode 10 (October 10)	Groups (Cowell)	RoXxy Montana	40	"Man in the Mirror"	Put in chair 3	Forever in Your Mind

^1 Rubio initially switched out Tim Olstad for Timmy Thames, but after some consideration brought him back and instead switched out Al Calderon.

== Contestants ==
The top 16 contestants were confirmed as follows;

Key:

– Winner
– Runner-Up

Act	Age(s)	Hometown	Category (mentor)	Result
Alex & Sierra	22	New Smyrna Beach, Florida/Orlando, Florida	Groups (Cowell)	Winner
Jeff Gutt	37	Marine City, Michigan	Over 25s (Rowland)	Runner-Up
Carlito Olivero	24	Chicago, Illinois	Boys (Rubio)	3rd Place
Restless Road	18-19	Various	Groups (Cowell)	4th Place
Rion Paige	13	Jacksonville, Florida	Girls (Lovato)	5th Place
Ellona Santiago	17	San Lorenzo, California	Girls (Lovato)	6th Place
Josh Levi	15	Houston, Texas	Boys (Rubio)	7th Place
Lillie McCloud	55	Orlando, Florida	Over 25s (Rowland)	8th Place
Tim Olstad	23	Winona, Minnesota	Boys (Rubio)	9th Place
Khaya Cohen	16	New York City, New York	Girls (Lovato)	10th Place
Rachel Potter	29	New Orleans, Louisiana	Over 25s (Rowland)	11th Place
Sweet Suspense	14-17	Various	Groups (Cowell)	12th Place
Carlos Guevara	16	Lexington, South Carolina	Boys (Rubio)	13th Place
RoXxy Montana	20-22	Wayne, Michigan	Groups (Cowell)	14th-16th Place
James Kenney	35	Portland, Oregon	Over 25s (Rowland)	14th-16th Place
Danie Geimer	15	Northridge, California	Girls (Lovato)	14th-16th Place

== Live shows ==
The first two-hour live show aired on a special Tuesday time slot on October 29; which followed the same format as the first season with each of the judges narrowing their number of acts down to three, without a public vote. The public vote then started with the following performance and results shows starting November 6, which aired on Wednesdays and Thursdays respectively. As with previous seasons, each live show had a different theme. The live final took place in on December 18 and 19. Cowell had also said on Twitter that there may be a wildcard this season. The leaderboard that showed which act had received the most public votes did not return.

=== Musical guests ===
Each results show featured musical performances from at least two artists. There was no guest performer on the first result show. Selena Gomez was supposed to perform on the second result show, but was postponed to third result show night which featured a performance from season 2 contestants Fifth Harmony. One Direction performed on the third results show. Michael Bublé performed on the fifth performance show, then again on the fifth results show alongside judge Demi Lovato. Emblem3 and Little Mix performed on the sixth results show, while Enrique Iglesias performed during the seventh results show. Paulina Rubio, Mary J. Blige, Lea Michele, Leona Lewis, Pitbull and One Direction performed on the finale.

=== Results summary ===
Color key

Act in Boys

Act in Girls

Act in Over 25s

Act in Groups

–	Act did not face the public vote
–	Act was eliminated by their mentor (no public vote or final showdown)
–	Act was in the bottom three and had to sing again in the final showdown
–	Act was in the bottom three but received the fewest votes and was immediately eliminated
–	Act received the fewest public votes and was immediately eliminated (no final showdown)
–	Act received the most public votes

Weekly results per act
Act	Week 1	Week 2^{3}	Week 3		Week 4	Week 5	Quarter-Final	Semi-Final	Final	
Act	Week 1	Week 2^{3}	Wednesday Vote^{3}	Thursday Vote	Week 4	Week 5	Quarter-Final	Semi-Final	First Vote	Second Vote
Alex & Sierra	Saved	—N/a^{3}	1st^{5}	1st^{5}	Safe^{5}	1st^{5}	1st^{5}	1st^{5}	1st^{5}	Winner
Jeff Gutt	Saved	—N/a^{3}	Safe	Safe	Safe	Safe	Safe	Safe	Safe	Runner-Up
Carlito Olivero	Saved	—N/a^{3}	Safe	Safe	Bottom three	Safe	Bottom three	Safe	3rd	Eliminated (final)
Restless Road	Saved	—N/a^{3}	Safe	Safe	Safe	Safe	Safe	4th	Eliminated (semi-final)	
Rion Paige	Saved	—N/a^{3}	Safe	Safe	Safe	6th	Bottom three	Eliminated (quarter-final)		
Ellona Santiago	Saved	—N/a^{3}	Safe	Safe	Safe	Safe	6th	Eliminated (quarter-final)		
Josh Levi	Eliminated^{2}	—N/a^{3}	Safe	Safe	Safe	7th	Eliminated (week 5)			
Lillie McCloud	Saved	—N/a^{3}	Safe	Safe	Safe	8th	Eliminated (week 5)			
Tim Olstad	Saved	—N/a^{3}	Safe	Safe	Bottom three	Eliminated (week 4)				
Khaya Cohen	Saved	—N/a^{3}	Safe	Bottom three	10th	Eliminated (week 4)				
Rachel Potter	Saved	—N/a^{3}	Safe	Bottom three	Eliminated (week 3)					
Sweet Suspense	Saved	—N/a^{3}	Safe	12th	Eliminated (week 3)					
Carlos Guevara	Saved	—N/a^{3}	13th	Eliminated (week 3)						
RoXxy Montana	Eliminated	Eliminated (week 1)								
James Kenney	Eliminated	Eliminated (week 1)								
Danie Geimer	Eliminated	Eliminated (week 1)								
Final Showdown	None^{1}	—N/a^{3}	No final showdown or judges' votes; results were based on public votes alone	Cohen, Potter	Olivero, Olstad	Levi, Paige	Olivero, Paige	No final showdown or judges' votes; results were based on public votes alone		
Judges voted to	Send Through	—N/a^{3}	No final showdown or judges' votes; results were based on public votes alone	Eliminate				No final showdown or judges' votes; results were based on public votes alone		
Rowland's vote	Potter, Gutt, McCloud	—N/a^{3}	No final showdown or judges' votes; results were based on public votes alone	Cohen	Olstad	Paige	Paige	No final showdown or judges' votes; results were based on public votes alone		
Rubio's vote	Olivero, Guevara, Olstad	—N/a^{3}	No final showdown or judges' votes; results were based on public votes alone	Potter	Olstad	Paige	Paige	No final showdown or judges' votes; results were based on public votes alone		
Lovato's vote	Santiago, Paige, Cohen	—N/a^{3}	No final showdown or judges' votes; results were based on public votes alone	Potter	Olstad	Levi	Olivero	No final showdown or judges' votes; results were based on public votes alone		
Cowell's vote	Restless Road, Alex & Sierra, Sweet Suspense	—N/a^{3}	No final showdown or judges' votes; results were based on public votes alone	Potter	—N/a^{4}	Levi	Paige	No final showdown or judges' votes; results were based on public votes alone		
Eliminated	Danie Geimer by Lovato	—N/a^{3}	Carlos Guevara; Public vote to save	Sweet Suspense; Public vote to save	Khaya Cohen; Public vote to save	Lillie McCloud; Public vote to save	Ellona Santiago; Public vote to save	Restless Road; Public vote to save	Carlito Olivero; Public vote to win	Jeff Gutt; Public vote to win
Eliminated	Josh Levi by Rubio	—N/a^{3}	Carlos Guevara; Public vote to save	Sweet Suspense; Public vote to save	Khaya Cohen; Public vote to save	Lillie McCloud; Public vote to save	Ellona Santiago; Public vote to save	Restless Road; Public vote to save	Carlito Olivero; Public vote to win	Jeff Gutt; Public vote to win
Eliminated	James Kenney by Rowland	—N/a^{3}	Carlos Guevara; Public vote to save	Rachel Potter; 3 of 4 votes Majority	Tim Olstad; 3 of 3 votes Majority	Josh Levi; 2 of 4 votes Deadlock	Rion Paige; 3 of 4 votes Majority	Restless Road; Public vote to save	Carlito Olivero; Public vote to win	Jeff Gutt; Public vote to win
Eliminated	RoXxy Montana by Cowell	—N/a^{3}	Carlos Guevara; Public vote to save	Rachel Potter; 3 of 4 votes Majority	Tim Olstad; 3 of 3 votes Majority	Josh Levi; 2 of 4 votes Deadlock	Rion Paige; 3 of 4 votes Majority	Restless Road; Public vote to save	Carlito Olivero; Public vote to win	Jeff Gutt; Public vote to win
Reference(s)										

- ^1 There was no public vote in the first week and therefore no final showdown. Each judge was required to save three of their own acts.
- ^2 Levi returned to the competition in week two because the judges felt that he should not have been eliminated in week one.
- ^3 Owing to graphic errors in which incorrect voting numbers were displayed on screen during the performance recap, there was no elimination in week two. All acts performed again on Thursday night in week two and a public re-vote was conducted. Carlos Guevara was eliminated on Wednesday night in week three after receiving the fewest votes in week two.
- ^4 Cowell was not required to vote as there was already a majority, but said after the show that he would have voted to eliminate Olstad.
- ^5 Cowell revealed in an interview that Alex & Sierra "won every single week" in the public vote except the fourth.

=== Live show details ===
==== Week 1 (October 29) ====
Acts performances on the first live show
Act	Category (mentor)	Order	Song	Result
Ellona Santiago	Girls (Lovato)	1	"Till the World Ends"	Safe
Danie Geimer	Girls (Lovato)	2	"Wrecking Ball"	Eliminated
Rion Paige	Girls (Lovato)	3	"Skyscraper"	Safe
Khaya Cohen	Girls (Lovato)	4	"Mercy"	Safe
Josh Levi	Boys (Rubio)	5	"Only Girl (in the World)"	Eliminated
Carlos Guevara	Boys (Rubio)	6	"Don't You Worry Child"	Safe
Carlito Olivero	Boys (Rubio)	7	"Maria Maria"	Safe
Tim Olstad	Boys (Rubio)	8	"Always"	Safe
Lillie McCloud	Over 25s (Rowland)	9	"When a Man Loves a Woman"	Safe
Jeff Gutt	Over 25s (Rowland)	10	"Try"	Safe
Rachel Potter	Over 25s (Rowland)	11	"I Hope You Dance"	Safe
James Kenney	Over 25s (Rowland)	12	"Red"	Eliminated
RoXxy Montana	Groups (Cowell)	13	"Royals"	Eliminated
Sweet Suspense	Groups (Cowell)	14	"I Love It"	Safe
Alex & Sierra	Groups (Cowell)	15	"Blurred Lines"	Safe
Restless Road	Groups (Cowell)	16	"Roar"	Safe

There was no public vote in the first week. Instead, each of the judges selected one of their own acts to eliminate.

Judges' votes to eliminate

- Lovato: Danie Geimer – gave no reason.
- Rubio: Josh Levi – gave no reason.
- Rowland: James Kenney – based on the performances.
- Cowell: RoXxy Montana – gave no reason.

==== Week 2 (November 6/7) ====
November 6

- Theme: Motown songs (billed as "Motown Night")
- Group performance: "ABC" / "Signed, Sealed, Delivered I'm Yours" / "Reach Out I'll Be There" / "Dancing in the Street" (all top 13 finalists except Josh Levi)

One of the four acts that did not face the public vote in week 1, and was eliminated by their mentor, was reinstated to the show as the judges felt that the act "deserves a second shot". The reinstated act was announced as Josh Levi.

Acts performances on the second live show (Wednesday)
Act	Category (mentor)	Order	Song
Josh Levi	Boys (Rubio)	1	"Who's Lovin' You"
Rachel Potter	Over 25s (Rowland)	2	"This Old Heart of Mine (Is Weak for You)"
Carlos Guevara	Boys (Rubio)	3	"What's Going On"
Restless Road	Groups (Cowell)	4	"Easy"
Ellona Santiago	Girls (Lovato)	5	"Baby Love"
Jeff Gutt	Over 25s (Rowland)	6	"Say You, Say Me"
Alex & Sierra	Groups (Cowell)	7	"I Heard It Through the Grapevine"
Khaya Cohen	Girls (Lovato)	8	"My Girl"
Carlito Olivero	Boys (Rubio)	9	"Stop! In the Name of Love"
Lillie McCloud	Over 25s (Rowland)	10	"All In Love Is Fair"
Sweet Suspense	Groups (Cowell)	11	"You Keep Me Hangin' On"
Rion Paige	Girls (Lovato)	12	"Ain't No Mountain High Enough"
Tim Olstad	Boys (Rubio)	13	"I'll Be There"

November 7

- Theme: "Save Me" songs

Owing to graphics error in which incorrect voting numbers were displayed on screen during the performance recap, there was no elimination this week, instead all the acts performed their "Save Me" songs on Thursday night and a public re-vote was conducted after the show. The results were announced the following week, at the start of the live show on Wednesday night.

Selena Gomez was going to perform her single "Slow Down" but due to graphics issues, she performed on the second night in week 3.

Acts performances on the second live show (Thursday)
Act	Category (mentor)	Order	Song	Result
Josh Levi	Boys (Rubio)	1	"Stay"	Safe
Rachel Potter	Over 25s (Rowland)	2	"Anyway"	Safe
Carlos Guevara	Boys (Rubio)	3	"Cannonball"	Eliminated
Restless Road	Groups (Cowell)	4	"Don't You Wanna Stay"	Safe
Ellona Santiago	Girls (Lovato)	5	"Titanium"	Safe
Jeff Gutt	Over 25s (Rowland)	6	"In the Air Tonight"	Safe
Alex & Sierra	Groups (Cowell)	7	"Give Me Love"	Safe (Highest Votes)
Khaya Cohen	Girls (Lovato)	8	"Distant Dreamer"	Safe
Carlito Olivero	Boys (Rubio)	9	"If You're Not the One"	Safe
Lillie McCloud	Over 25s (Rowland)	10	"Who Wants to Live Forever"	Safe
Sweet Suspense	Groups (Cowell)	11	"That Should Be Me"	Safe
Rion Paige	Girls (Lovato)	12	"Born This Way"	Safe
Tim Olstad	Boys (Rubio)	13	"I Believe I Can Fly"	Safe

==== Week 3 (November 13/14) ====
- Theme: Songs from the 1980s (billed as "80s Night")
- Group performance: "Perfect Day"
- Musical guests: Selena Gomez ("Slow Down") and Fifth Harmony ("Me & My Girls")

Carlos Guevara, the act that received the fewest votes from the public re-vote in week 2, was eliminated at the start of the November 13 episode. He would have performed "Mad World". Starting from week three, two acts were eliminated from each results show until week six. The three acts with the fewest public votes were announced and then the act with the fewest votes was automatically eliminated. The remaining two acts then performed in the final showdown and face the judges' votes.

Acts performances on the third live show
Act	Category (mentor)	Order	Song	Year	Result
Lillie McCloud	Over 25s (Rowland)	1	"Ain't Nobody"	1983	Safe
Carlito Olivero	Boys (Rubio)	2	"Rhythm Is Gonna Get You"	1987	Safe
Rion Paige	Girls (Lovato)	3	"We Belong"	1984	Safe
Sweet Suspense	Groups (Cowell)	4	"Mickey"	1981	Eliminated
Tim Olstad	Boys (Rubio)	5	"Against All Odds (Take a Look at Me Now)"	1984	Safe
Khaya Cohen	Girls (Lovato)	6	"Borderline"	1984	Bottom Three
Restless Road	Groups (Cowell)	7	"Footloose"	1984	Safe
Rachel Potter	Over 25s (Rowland)	8	"Alone"	1987	Bottom Three
Ellona Santiago	Girls (Lovato)	9	"I Wanna Dance with Somebody (Who Loves Me)"	1987	Safe
Josh Levi	Boys (Rubio)	10	"Straight Up"	1988	Safe
Jeff Gutt	Over 25s (Rowland)	11	"(I Just) Died in Your Arms"	1986	Safe
Alex & Sierra	Groups (Cowell)	12	"Addicted to Love"	1986	Safe (Highest Votes)
Final showdown details
Khaya Cohen	Girls (Lovato)	1	"Don't Give Up on Me"		Safe
Rachel Potter	Over 25s (Rowland)	2	"From This Moment On"		Eliminated

Judges' votes to eliminate

- Rowland: Khaya Cohen – based on the final showdown performances and backed her act, Rachel Potter.
- Rubio: Rachel Potter – gave no reason.
- Lovato: Rachel Potter – backed her own act, Khaya Cohen.
- Cowell: Rachel Potter – felt that Cohen had more potential.

However, voting statistics revealed that Potter received more votes than Cohen which meant that if Cowell sent the result to deadlock, Potter would have been saved.

==== Week 4 (November 20/21) ====
- Theme: Songs by British artists (billed as "British Invasion")
- Musical guest: One Direction ("Story of My Life")

Acts performances on the fourth live show
Act	Category (mentor)	Order	Song	British Musician	Result
Jeff Gutt	Over 25s (Rowland)	1	"Bohemian Rhapsody"	Queen	Safe
Tim Olstad	Boys (Rubio)	2	"Sorry Seems to Be the Hardest Word"	Elton John	Bottom Three
Khaya Cohen	Girls (Lovato)	3	"Let It Be"	The Beatles	Eliminated
Josh Levi	Boys (Rubio)	4	"Sweet Dreams (Are Made of This)"	Eurythmics	Safe
Alex & Sierra	Groups (Cowell)	5	"Best Song Ever"	One Direction	Safe
Rion Paige	Girls (Lovato)	6	"Your Song"	Elton John	Safe (Highest Votes)
Carlito Olivero	Boys (Rubio)	7	"(I Can't Get No) Satisfaction"	The Rolling Stones	Bottom Three
Lillie McCloud	Over 25s (Rowland)	8	"This Woman's Work"	Kate Bush	Safe
Ellona Santiago	Girls (Lovato)	9	"Burn"	Ellie Goulding	Safe
Restless Road	Groups (Cowell)	10	"Fix You"	Coldplay	Safe
Final showdown details
Tim Olstad	Boys (Rubio)	1	"You Raise Me Up"		Eliminated
Carlito Olivero	Boys (Rubio)	2	"Beneath Your Beautiful"		Safe

Judges' votes to eliminate

- Rowland: Tim Olstad – based on the final showdown performances.
- Lovato: Tim Olstad – gave no reason.
- Rubio: Tim Olstad – gave no reason.
- Cowell was not required to vote since there was already a majority, but said after the show that his "heart went out to" Olivero, so he would have voted to eliminate Olstad.

==== Week 5 (November 27/28) ====
- Theme: Big band (billed as "Big Band Night")
- Guest mentor: Michael Bublé
- Group performances:
  - Wednesday: "Cry Me a River"
  - Thursday: "Somewhere Only We Know"
- Musical guests:
  - Wednesday: Michael Bublé ("You Make Me Feel So Young")
  - Thursday: Demi Lovato ("Neon Lights") and Michael Bublé ("It's a Beautiful Day")

Acts performances on the fifth live show
Act	Category (mentor)	Order	Song	Result
Rion Paige	Girls (Lovato)	1	"Swingin'"	Bottom Three
Restless Road	Groups (Cowell)	2	"Life Is a Highway"	Safe
Jeff Gutt	Over 25s (Rowland)	3	"Feeling Good"	Safe
Josh Levi	Boys (Rubio)	4	"Treasure"	Bottom Three
Carlito Olivero	Boys (Rubio)	5	"La Copa de Vida"/"María"	Safe
Alex & Sierra	Groups (Cowell)	6	"I Knew You Were Trouble"	Safe (Highest Votes)
Lillie McCloud	Over 25s (Rowland)	7	"Summertime"	Eliminated
Ellona Santiago	Girls (Lovato)	8	"Mamma Knows Best"	Safe
Final showdown details
Rion Paige	Girls (Lovato)	1	"Perfect"	Safe
Josh Levi	Boys (Rubio)	2	"When I Was Your Man"	Eliminated

Judges' votes to eliminate

- Lovato: Josh Levi – backed her own act, Rion Paige.
- Rubio: Rion Paige – backed her own act, Josh Levi.
- Rowland: Rion Paige – gave no reason.
- Cowell: Josh Levi – could not decide and sent the result to deadlock.

With the acts in the bottom two receiving two votes each, the result went to deadlock and reverted to the earlier public vote. Levi was eliminated as the act with the fewest public votes.

==== Week 6: Quarter-Final (December 4/5) ====
- Themes: Divas; unplugged songs (billed as "stripped down songs")
- Musical guests: Emblem3 ("Just for One Day") and Little Mix ("Move")

For the first time this season, each act performed two songs.

Acts' performances in the quarter-final
Act	Category (mentor)	Order	First song	Diva	Order	Second song	Result
Restless Road	Groups (Cowell)	1	"Red"	Taylor Swift	7	"Wake Me Up"	Safe
Rion Paige	Girls (Lovato)	2	"See You Again"	Carrie Underwood	8	"Glass"	Bottom Three
Jeff Gutt	Over 25s (Rowland)	3	"Without You"	Mariah Carey	9	"Daniel"	Safe
Ellona Santiago	Girls (Lovato)	4	"Applause"	Lady Gaga	10	"If I Were a Boy"	Eliminated
Alex & Sierra	Groups (Cowell)	5	"Say My Name"	Destiny's Child	11	"Say Something"	Safe (Highest Votes)
Carlito Olivero	Boys (Rubio)	6	"Let's Get Loud"	Jennifer Lopez	12	"Stand by Me"	Bottom Three
Final showdown details
Rion Paige	Girls (Lovato)	1	"The House That Built Me"				Eliminated
Carlito Olivero	Boys (Rubio)	2	"You Make Me Wanna..."				Safe

Judges' votes to eliminate

- Lovato: Carlito Olivero – backed her own act, Rion Paige.
- Rubio: Rion Paige – backed her own act, Carlito Olivero.
- Rowland: Rion Paige – based on the final showdown performances though stated both acts did not give their best.
- Cowell: Rion Paige – wanted to give Olivero the opportunity to stay in the competition as he felt the competition was "probably his last chance".

==== Week 7: Semi-Final (December 11/12) ====
- Themes: Viewers' choice; "songs to get you to the final" (no theme)
- Group performances:
  - Wednesday: "Falling Slowly" (performed by Alex & Sierra and Carlito Olivero) and "Every Breath You Take" (performed by Jeff Gutt and Restless Road)
  - Thursday: "Stronger (What Doesn't Kill You)"
- Musical guest: Enrique Iglesias ("Heart Attack")

On December 4, the song choices for the public were revealed.

List of song choices for viewers' choice week
Act	Category (mentor)	Song Choices	Result
Alex & Sierra	Groups (Cowell)	"Hold On, We're Going Home"	Not Chosen
Alex & Sierra	Groups (Cowell)	"Little Talks"	Chosen
Alex & Sierra	Groups (Cowell)	"Troublemaker"	Not Chosen
Carlito Olivero	Boys (Rubio)	"Boyfriend"	Chosen
Carlito Olivero	Boys (Rubio)	"Hasta Ayer"	Not Chosen
Carlito Olivero	Boys (Rubio)	"Promise"	Not Chosen
Ellona Santiago	Girls (Lovato)	"Love Me Again"	N/A (Already Eliminated)
Ellona Santiago	Girls (Lovato)	"Who You Are"	N/A (Already Eliminated)
Ellona Santiago	Girls (Lovato)	"You Got the Love"	N/A (Already Eliminated)
Jeff Gutt	Over 25s (Rowland)	"Creep"	Not Chosen
Jeff Gutt	Over 25s (Rowland)	"Hallelujah"	Chosen
Jeff Gutt	Over 25s (Rowland)	"Wonderwall"	Not Chosen
Restless Road	Groups (Cowell)	"Hey Brother"	Not Chosen
Restless Road	Groups (Cowell)	"It Goes Like This"	Not Chosen
Restless Road	Groups (Cowell)	"That's My Kind of Night"	Chosen
Rion Paige	Girls (Lovato)	"Girl on Fire"	N/A (Already Eliminated)
Rion Paige	Girls (Lovato)	"So Small"	N/A (Already Eliminated)
Rion Paige	Girls (Lovato)	"Umbrella"	N/A (Already Eliminated)

Acts' performances in the semi-final
Act	Category (mentor)	Order	First song	Order	Second song	Result
Carlito Olivero	Boys (Rubio)	1	"Boyfriend"	5	"I Need to Know"	Safe
Restless Road	Groups (Cowell)	2	"That's My Kind of Night"	6	"Wanted"	Eliminated
Alex & Sierra	Groups (Cowell)	3	"Little Talks"	7	"Gravity"	Safe (Highest Votes)
Jeff Gutt	Over 25s (Rowland)	4	"Hallelujah"	8	"Demons"	Safe

The semi-final did not feature a final showdown and instead the act with the fewest public votes, Restless Road, was automatically eliminated. The top three acts each then performed a victory song of their choice after they were announced safe, with Olivero performing "Suavemente", Alex & Sierra performing "Let Her Go", and Gutt performing "Open Arms".

==== Week 8: Final (December 18/19) ====
The final consisted of two two-hour episodes on December 18 and 19.

December 18

- Themes: Winner's song (billed as "song to win"); celebrity duets (billed as "musical hero duets"); favorite performance (billed as "song of the season")
- Group performance: "We Will Rock You"
- Musical guest: Paulina Rubio ("Boys Will Be Boys")

Acts' performances on the Wednesday Final
Act	Category (mentor)	Order	First song	Order	Second song (duet)	Order	Third song
Carlito Olivero	Boys (Rubio)	1	"Impossible"	4	"Stand by Me" (with Prince Royce)	7	"Maria Maria"
Alex & Sierra	Groups (Cowell)	2	"Give Me Love"	5	"Bleeding Love" (with Leona Lewis)	8	"Say Something"
Jeff Gutt	Over 25s (Rowland)	3	"Dream On"	6	"Iris" (with John Rzeznik)	9	"Creep"

December 19

- Theme: Christmas songs
- Group performances: "One" (all top 13 finalists) and "Love Me Again" (performed by Alex & Sierra and Jeff Gutt)
- Musical guests: Mary J. Blige ("Rudolph the Red-Nosed Reindeer"), Lea Michele ("Cannonball"), Leona Lewis ("One More Sleep"), Pitbull ("Timber") and One Direction ("Midnight Memories")

Acts' performances on Thursday Final
Act	Category (mentor)	Order	Song	Result
Carlito Olivero	Boys (Rubio)	1	"Christmas (Baby Please Come Home)"	Eliminated
Jeff Gutt	Over 25s (Rowland)	2	"O Holy Night"	Runner-Up
Alex & Sierra	Groups (Cowell)	3	"All I Want for Christmas Is You"	Winner

== Notes ==
- ^1 There was no public vote in the first week and therefore no final showdown. Each judge was required to save three of their own acts.
- ^2 Levi returned to the competition in week two because the judges felt that he should not have been eliminated in week one.
- ^3 Owing to graphic errors in which incorrect voting numbers were displayed on screen during the performance recap, there was no elimination in week two. All acts performed again on Thursday night in week two and a public re-vote was conducted. Carlos Guevara was eliminated on Wednesday night in week three after receiving the fewest votes in week two.
- ^4 Cowell was not required to vote as there was already a majority, but said after the show that he would have voted to eliminate Olstad.
- ^5 Cowell revealed in an interview that Alex & Sierra "won every single week" in the public vote except the fourth.

== Contestants who Appeared on Other Seasons or Shows ==
- James Kenney auditioned for Season 1, but was eliminated during the Judges' Home round.
- Jeff Gutt auditioned for Season 2, but was eliminated on the last day of the Bootcamp round.
- Ellona Santiago competed in Season 1 as a member of InTENsity, who were eliminated in 12th place.
- Carlito Olivero competed on Making Menudo on MTV under his real name "Carlos Olivero". He was one of the five contestants selected to become a member of Menudo
- Chase Goehring competed on the twelfth season of America's Got Talent. He received a golden buzzer from guest judge DJ Khaled during Judges' Cuts. He finished in the Top Ten.
- Stone Martin and Timmy Thames appeared on Boy Band. Both were eliminated on episode 1.
- Rylie Brown appeared on the 23rd season of American Idol as "Rylie O'Neil". She was eliminated in the last cuts of the Hollywood round.
- RoXxy Montana briefly appeared on Season 1 and Season 2, but were eliminated before the Judges Houses. Their auditions were not shown.

== Famous Relations ==
- Primrose Martin, who was eliminated during the Four Chair Challenge, is the daughter of Skip Martin

== Reception ==
=== U.S. Nielsen ratings ===
Ep. #	Episode	Airdate	Viewers (millions)	Rating/share (18–49)	Rank (timeslot)	Rank (night)	Source
1	Auditions 1	September 11	6.45	2.2/7	2	3	
2	Auditions 2	September 12	6.87	2.2/7	2	2	
3	Auditions 3	September 18	6.62	2.2/7	2	4	
4	Auditions 4	September 19	6.43	2.0/7	2	4	
5	Auditions 5	September 25	7.73	2.5/7	2	7	
6	Auditions 6	September 26	6.47	2.1/6	2	8	
7	Four-Chair challenge 1	October 2	7.80	2.4/7	3	7	
8	Four-Chair challenge 2	October 3	7.13	2.0/6	2	8	
9	Four-Chair challenge 3	October 9	7.25	2.2/6	3	6	
10	Four-Chair challenge 4	October 10	6.49	2.0/6	2	3	
11	Finalists chosen (Top 12)	October 29^{note 1}	4.90	1.5/4	3	5	
12	Meet the Top 12	October 31	3.25	0.8/3	5	8	
13	Top 13 perform	November 6	4.54	1.5/4	2 (Tie)	4 (Tie)	
14	Top 13 Acts Get Another Chance	November 7	3.67	1.2/4	4	9	
15	Top 12 perform	November 13	5.78	1.7/5	2	4	
16	Live results 1	November 14	5.18	1.3/4	2 (Tie)	3 (Tie)	
17	Top 10 perform	November 20	5.51	1.7/5	3	4 (Tie)	
18	Live results 2	November 21	5.88	1.6/5	2	2	
19	Top 8 perform	November 27	4.85	1.2/4	2		
20	Live results 3	November 28	3.75	1.0/3	3		
21	Top 6 perform	December 4	5.41	1.4/4	4		
22	Live results 4	December 5	4.93	1.4/4	3		
23	Top 4 perform	December 11	4.97	1.4/4			
24	Live results 5	December 12	4.90	1.2/4			
25	Top 3 perform	December 18	5.04	1.3/4			
26	Winner announced	December 19	6.22	1.7/5			

Notes

^1 Due to the 2013 MLB World Series running past October 28, the first live show of the season aired on October 29 to make room for Wednesday's potential deciding game.

=== Controversy ===
==== Voting numbers graphic error ====
Due to graphic errors made in the top 13 round of the live shows regarding voting, all voting results posted in that episode were invalidated, and the contestants sang once more in the show of November 7, with the results revealed on November 13.
