= The Elvis Brothers =

American rock group

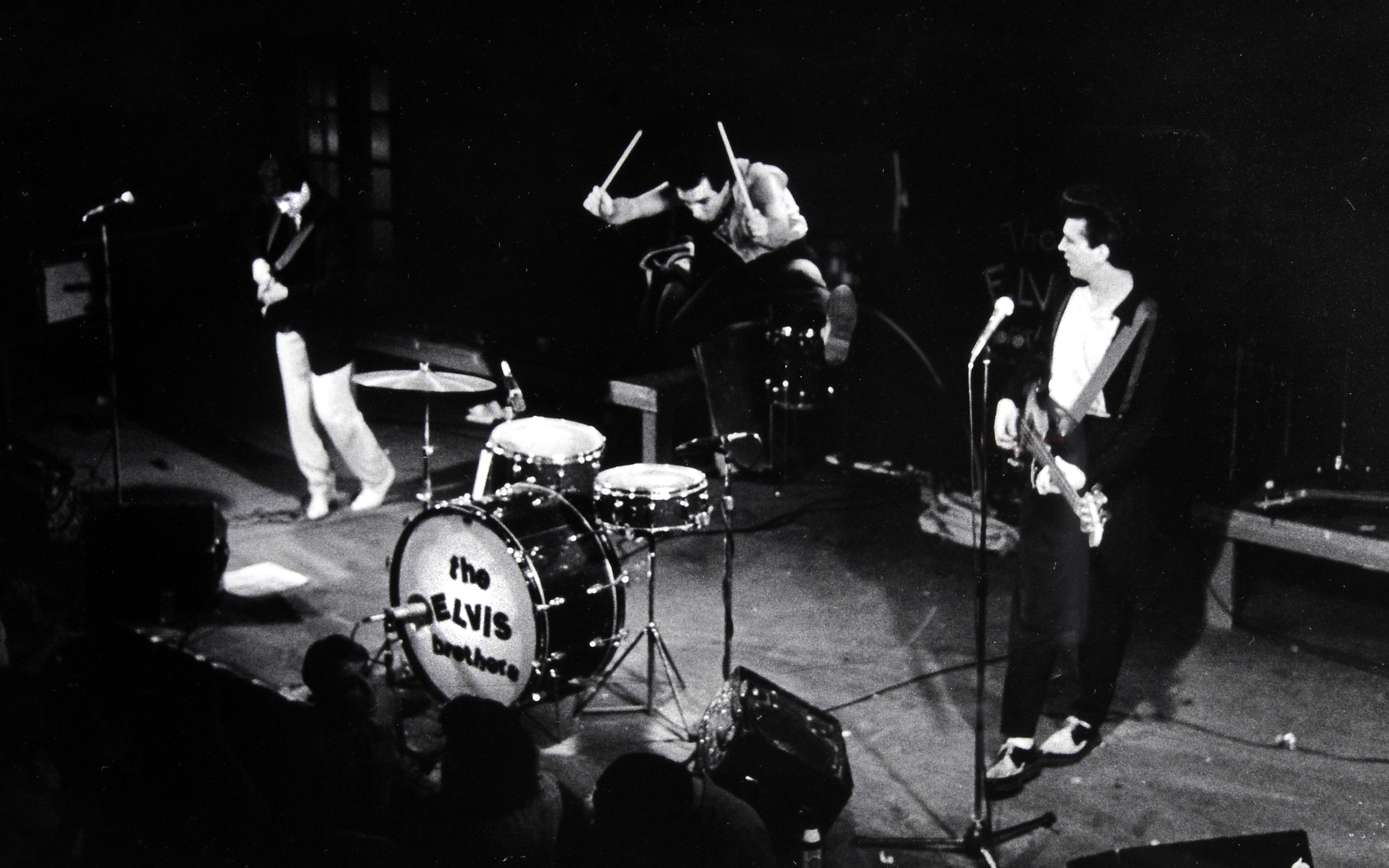
- Live at Mabel's in Champaign, IL 1982

Background information
- Origin: Champaign, IL
- Genre: Rock/pop
- Years active: 1981–1997, 2002
- Labels: Portrait Records, Recession Records
- Past members: Rob Elvis; Graham Elvis; Brad Elvis; Adam Schmitt; Randy Seals

The Elvis Brothers were a rock/pop trio (and sometimes quartet) that got its start in Champaign, Illinois in 1981, and were "staples of midwest clubs and theaters from the early 80s through the early 90s". The members were Rob Elvis (guitar, vocals), Graham Elvis (bass, vocals) and Brad Elvis (drums). The band released two albums with Portrait/Epic Records: Movin' Up in 1983, and Adventure Time in 1985. The band lost their record deal when Portrait was closed in 1986. The original trio re-united in 1992 and released an album called Now Dig This on Recession Records. On April 5, 2002, International Pop Overthrow music festival hosted an Elvis Brothers Reunion show at the Abbey Pub in Chicago, IL. After the Elvis Brothers broke up, Brad Elvis replaced Clem Burke as the drummer for The Romantics.

== The band name ==
The band started off as a duo of Rob and Graham and at that time they included many Elvis Presley covers in their set, so when they had to come up with a name, they jokingly went with "The Elvis Brothers" and it stuck.

== Reception ==
- "If you're really committed to the 'fun' only unpretentious pop can provide, you might as well go directly to these proud posers, who generate hooks in an abundance that will shame whatever 'authentic' locals you retain a sentimental yen for. Connoisseurs of pop plasticity will get an additional kick out of how affectlessly they shift from the usual ersatz teen romance to equally meaningless and equally commercial outlaw and rebel themes. Plus an uncanny Beatle impression on 'It's So Hard.' B− " (Robert Christgau)
- "the band released a pair of albums ... that, while not groundbreaking, were well-crafted pop, and highly regarded in power pop circles." (Chris Woodstra, Allmusic)
- "(The Elvis Brothers) played a marvelous (and deceptively simple) concoction of slicked-up rockabilly, stripped-down Cheap Trick-tinged melodic rock and roll and pristine pure pop that boasts superbly articulated energy, occasionally goofy lyrics and enough hooks to catch a school of minnows. (Ira Robbins, Trouser Press)
- "Take Rockpile's loose-as-a-goose barroom stomp-downs, add Cheap Trick's Midwestern hard-pop sensibility and cartoon-character posturing, throw in Squeeze's knack for the modern hook and the Stray Cats's rockabilly-trio configuration, and you'll have some idea of where the Elvis Brothers are coming from." (Parke Puterpaugh, Rolling Stone)

== Members ==
Main members

- Rob Elvis (Rob Newhouse) - guitar, vocals
- Graham Elvis (Graham Walker) - bass, vocals
- Brad Elvis (Brad Steakley) - drums

Additional members

- Adam Schmitt - guitar, vocals
- Randy Seals - drums

== Discography ==
=== Albums ===
- Movin' Up (1983, Portrait)
- Adventure Time (1985, Portrait)
- Now Dig This (1992, Recession Records)
- Movin' Up/Adventure Time (1995, Sony/Recession Records)

=== Singles ===
- "Fire In The City" / "Here We Go Again" (1983, Portrait)
- "Hidden In A Heartbeat" / "Full Speed Straight Ahead" (1983, Portrait)
- "Fire In The City" / "Full Speed Straight Ahead" (1984, Portrait UK)
- "Somebody Call The Police" / "Crosswinds" (1985, Portrait)
- "Don't Take My Guns Away" (1985, Portrait)
- "Motormouth" / "Rock For It" (1992, Recession)
- "Valentine" / "The Great American Acid Test" (1992, Recession)
