= Lillie McCloud =

American singer

Lillie Nicole McCloud
- Also known as: Nicole (early recording career); Nicole McCloud; Nicole J. McCloud
- Born: Lillie Arlene Nicole Jade McCloud; December 7, 1958 (age 67); Rochester, New York, U.S.
- Genres: R&B, soul, house, gospel
- Occupations: Musician, singer, songwriter
- Years active: 1985–present
- Labels: Portrait Records, Epic Records, Sony Music, Spectra Music Group

Lillie Arlene Nicole Jade McCloud (born December 7, 1958, in Rochester, New York), commonly known by her former stage name Nicole McCloud, or Nicole J. McCloud is an American dance and R&B singer. She has recorded five studio albums: What About Me (1986), Jam Packed (1988) (aka Rock the House), Love Town (1998), So What? (2002), and Red Apples (2015). Her single "Don't You Want My Love" became an international hit. Other US singles include "Runnin' Away", "Search'n", "One Good Reason", "Rock the House", and the "Alabaster Box" cover. In the late 1990s, she was also part of a house music project Voices of Freedom.

In 2013, she competed in season 3 of the American singing competition The X Factor. She was eliminated in the 5th week, being the sixth contestant eliminated.

== Career ==
=== Solo as Nicole ===
McCloud first appeared on the Billboard US R&B charts as 'Nicole' in 1985 with "Always and Forever". Her single "Don't You Want My Love" in 1986 reached Top 10 in the US Dance charts, in addition to charting in Belgium, France, Germany, the Netherlands, and Sweden.

Ten of McCloud's singles landed the US Billboard specialized R&B and dance charts. As of 2013, her biggest hit has been the 1994 single "Runnin’ Away", which peaked at No. 3 on US Dance charts. In 2002 as Nicole J. McCloud, McCloud returned to the Top 10 with "Search’n", peaking at No. 5 on the US Dance charts. That same year she received a nomination for the International Dance Music Awards, along Craig David and Shakira.

She has recorded hits with Timmy Thomas, U.S.U.R.A. and The Source and has performed with Stevie Wonder, Michael Jackson, the group Kool & The Gang, Bruce Springsteen, Mick Jagger, and other artists.

=== In Voices of Freedom ===
In the late 1990s, McCloud joined the American house project Voices of Freedom. The trio also included Angel Williams and Simone Böhlhoff. The trio was featured in a number of recordings, notably in E-Smoove & Ni-Che's 1999 single "Lift Your Hands Up" that featured the vocals of Voices of Freedom. The recording was made available through Finger Printz label. The trio was also featured in a 2002 recording by DJ Pope titled "America at War (Freedom)" on the Yellorange label.

== Life in Slovakia ==
In the mid-2000s, McCloud moved to Košice, a city in Slovakia. Her first Slovak performance took place at the prestigious Košice International Jazz Festival 2006, where she performed with jazz legend Peter Lipa.

In 2010, McCloud provided the title song for Česko Slovensko má talent, the joint Czech/Slovak version of Got Talent series. It was broadcast on TV JOJ in Slovakia and on TV Prima in the Czech Republic.

== The X Factor ==
In 2013, McCloud made a comeback taking part in season 3 of the American singing competition The X Factor identified as Lillie McCloud, her birth name. At the time of applying to The X Factor, she was 54 years old with three children (a son and two daughters) and seven grandchildren.

Her audition was broadcast on September 12, 2013. She received a standing ovation and four "yes" votes from judges Demi Lovato, Simon Cowell, Paulina Rubio and Kelly Rowland for her rendition of CeCe Winans' "Alabaster Box".

She was selected by the judges to progress to the Top 40 and subsequently Top successfully in the Four Chair Challenge, securing her position in the Top 16. As part of the Top Four "Over 25s", she was mentored by Kelly Rowland. She made it as far as the Top 8 but was eliminated on November 28, 2013.

Her performances on The X Factor were:

Day of broadcast	Show	Theme	Song	Original artist	Result
September 12	Audition	Free choice	"Alabaster Box"	CeCe Winans	Through to Four-Chair challenge
October 2	Four-Chair Challenge	Solo performance	"A House Is Not a Home"	Dionne Warwick	Advanced
October 29	Live show 1 (Top 16)	Mentor's choice	"When a Man Loves a Woman"	Percy Sledge	Saved by Kelly Rowland
November 6	Live show 2 (Top 13)	Motown Night	"All In Love is Fair"	Stevie Wonder	N/A
November 7	Live show 3 (Top 13 Get Another Chance)	Free choice	"Who Wants To Live Forever"	Queen	Safe
November 13	Live show 4 (Top 12)	80's Night	"Ain't Nobody"	Rufus & Chaka Khan	Safe
November 20	Live show 5 (Top 10)	British Invasion	This Woman's Work	Kate Bush	Safe
November 27	Live show 6 (Top 8)	Big Band Night	Summertime	George Gershwin	Eliminated (8th)

== After X Factor ==
=== Red Apples ===
In 2014, McCloud signed with the Spectra Music Group and released a single entitled "What About The Beautiful Children" and later "The Other Part of Me". Her album, "Red Apples" was released on May 27, 2015, under Monarchy Records, a subsidy of Spectra. On the week ending September 13, 2015, Red Apples debuted at #16 on the UK Soul Charts.

== Discography ==
=== Albums ===
Year	Album title	Credited as
1986	What About Me?	Nicole
1988	Jam Packed	Nicole
1989	Rock The House (US re-release of Jam Packed)	Nicole
1998	Love Town	Nicole McCloud
2002	So What?	Nicole J McCloud
2015	Red Apples	Lillie Nicole McCloud
2015	Number One Contender (re-release of Love Town, with selections from Red Apples)	Lillie McCloud

=== Singles ===
Year	Title	Credited as	Peak chart positions										Album
Year	Title	Credited as	US Dance	US R&B	BEL	FRA	GER	ITA	NED	SWE	SWI	UK	Album
1985	"Always and Forever"	Nicole	—	66	—	—	—	—	—	—	—	—	What About Me?
1986	"Don't You Want My Love"	Nicole	10	66	7	18	20	—	9	8	—	99	What About Me?
1986	"New York Eyes" / "Ordinary Girl" (Nicole & Timmy Thomas) / Nicole)	Nicole	—	—	36	—	—	—	—	—	—	41	What About Me?
1986	"Housecalls"	Nicole	—	—	—	—	—	—	—	—	—	182	What About Me?
1986	"What About Me?"	Nicole	—	52	—	—	—	—	—	—	—	142	What About Me?
1988	"Jam Packed (At the Wall)"	Nicole	34	93	—	—	—	—	—	—	—	107	Jam Packed / Rock the House (US release)
1989	"Rock the House"	Nicole	21	62	—	—	—	—	—	—	—	—	Jam Packed / Rock the House (US release)
1992	"Rock the House" (with The Source)	Nicole	—	—	—	—	—	—	—	—	—	63	Non-album release
1994	"Drive Me Crazy" (with U.S.U.R.A.)	Nicole	—	—	—	—	—	8	—	—	30	—	Non-album release
1994	"Runnin' Away"	Nicole	3	—	—	—	—	—	—	—	—	69	Love Town
1996	"Long Train Runnin' (Without Love)"	Nicole	35	—	—	—	—	—	—	—	—	—	Love Town
1998	"Missing You"	Nicole McCloud	—	—	—	—	—	—	—	—	—	—	Love Town
1999	"I Ain't Crazy"	Nicole McCloud	—	—	—	—	—	—	—	—	—	—	Love Town
2001	"One Good Reason"	Nicole J. McCloud	38	—	—	—	—	—	—	—	—	—	So What?
2002	"Search'n"	Nicole J. McCloud	5	—	—	—	—	—	—	—	—	—	So What?

Others

- 2010: "Got Talent" - theme for show TV Prima Česko Slovensko má talent
- 2014: "What About the Beautiful Children"
- 2014: "The Other Part of Me"

=== Featured in / Appearances ===
as Nicole

- 1994: "I Love Music" / "Don't You Want My Love" / "Conga" (O'Jays / Nicole / Miami Sound Machine)
- 2011: "Dance" (Guest singer on Takin'Off album Eleven)

as part of Voices of Freedom

- 1999: "Lift Your Hands Up" (E-Smoove & Ni-Che featuring Voices Of Freedom)
- 2002: "America at War (Freedom)" (DJ Pope featuring Voices of Freedom)

=== Videography ===
- 2013: "The X Factor USA" (contestant, finished 8th place)
- 2014: "The Good Life" (herself, performer)
