= The Best of Sword =

Compilation album by Sword
- Released: November 7, 2006
- Recorded: 1985–1988
- Genre: Heavy metal
- Length: 45:30
- Label: Aquarius
- Producer: Pierre Paradis, Garth Richardson, Producer

Sword chronology
Sweet Dreams (1988)	The Best of Sword (2006)

The Best of Sword is a compilation album by the Canadian metal band Sword, released in 2006 by Aquarius Records.

== Track listing ==
1. "Stoned Again"
2. "F.T.W."
3. "Until Death Do Us Part"
4. "Outta Control"
5. "Runaway"
6. "Land of the Brave"
7. "Children of Heaven"
8. "Prepare to Die"
9. "State of Shock"
10. "Evil Spell"
11. "The Threat"
12. "Sweet Dreams"
13. "Get It While You Can" (Reissue only)
14. "Leather Lust" (Reissue only)
15. If You Want It" (Reissue only)
