= Sinners and Saints =

Sinners and Saints may refer to:

- Sinners and Saints (album), by New York based punk/glam rock band Toilet Böys
- Sinners and Saints (film), 2010 film set in post-Katrina New Orleans

== See also ==
- Saints and Sinners (disambiguation)
- Sinner or a Saint, 2010 album by Tamar Kaprelian
