= What About Me? (Nicole album) =

Studio album by Nicole
- Released: 1986
- Label: Portrait
- Producer: Lou Pace

Professional ratings
Review scores
Source	Rating
Allmusic	3/5 stars

What About Me? is the debut album by Nicole (real name Lillie McCloud). The album simply refers to her as Nicole. Timmy Thomas appears on the album with Nicole on the song "New York Eyes".

== Track listing ==
=== Side one ===
1. "Don't You Want My Love"
2. "New York Eyes" (with Timmy Thomas)
3. "Housecalls"
4. "What About Me"

=== Side two ===
1. "Always and Forever"
2. "Why You Take My Love"
3. "Ordinary Girl"
4. "Shy Boy"
5. "It Happens Every Night"
