= Sword (band) =

Canadian heavy metal band

- Origin: Saint-Bruno-de-Montarville, Quebec
- Genres: Heavy metal
- Years active: 1980–1995, 2011–present
- Labels: Aquarius Records, Massacre Records
- Members: Rick Hughes; Mike Plant; Mike Larock; Dan Hughes

Sword is a Canadian heavy metal band from Saint-Bruno-de-Montarville, Quebec, that was formed in 1981 and is still active to this day. To date, they have released three studio albums, one compilation, one live album and three singles.

== History ==
In 1981, south of Montreal in Saint Bruno de Montarville, Quebec, Rick (vocals) and Dan Hughes (drums) formed a heavy metal band called Sword. They were joined by guitarist Mike Plant and bassist Mike Larocque in the first lineup of the band. They signed their first commercial contract in 1984 with Aquarius Records.

Sword released two albums for Aquarius in the late 1980s; the debut album Metalized in 1986 and its follow-up Sweet Dreams in 1988.

They toured in the support slot for Motörhead and Alice Cooper, and the group opened for Metallica on their Master of Puppets tour in 1986.

Rick Hughes also formed Saints & Sinners and released a self-titled album with them.

In October 2006, Aquarius Records released The Best of Sword a compilation album. Metalized was re-issued in 2009.

Throughout their career, Sword sold in excess of 180,000 albums.

Sword has been more active since 2011 when they reunited for a show in Saguenay.

They have since played various festivals in Canada and Germany. In 2016, they released Live Hammersmith, recorded while they were on tour supporting Motörhead in 1987.

Sword's third studio album (their first in 34 years) titled III was released on November 25, 2022. The band is currently writing new material for their next album.

== Discography ==
=== Studio albums ===
- Metalized (1986)
- Sweet Dreams (1988)
- III (2022)

=== Live albums ===
- Live Hammersmith (2016)

=== Compilation albums ===
- The Best of Sword (2006)

== Related information ==
In 2006, Rick Hughes released a solo album called Train d'enfer. Mike Plant plays guitar for the band Porn Flakes.
