= Don't You Want My Love =

Single by Nicole

from the album What About Me?
- Released: 1985
- Recorded: 1985
- Genre: Disco, R&B
- Songwriter(s): Aldo Nova
- Producer(s): Lou Pace

Nicole singles chronology
"Always and Forever" (1985)	"Don't You Want My Love" (1985)	"New York Eyes" / "Ordinary Girl" (1985)

"Don't You Want My Love" is a 1985/1986 hit song by Nicole McCloud under her mononym Nicole. The song was written by Aldo Nova and became a hit in several European countries and charted on the Billboard dance chart (#10) and R&B chart (#66) in the US.

The song appeared on the soundtrack to the 1986 film Ruthless People.

The "Maxi Club version" of the single went on to become an international dance hit for her charting in Belgium, France, Germany, the Netherlands and Sweden.

== Track listing ==
The US release

- A1: "Don't You Want My Love" (club mix) (5:00)
- B1: "Don't You Want My Love" (dub mix) (6:12)

UK release

- A1: "Don't You Want My Love" (club mix) (5:00)
- B1: "Don't You Want My Love" (dub mix) (6:12)
- B2: "Shy Boy" (4:04)

== 2002 remix ==
In her 2002 album So What, she released a remix version mixed by Larry "Ford" Fordyce and titled "Don't You Want My Love (2002)".

== Charts ==
=== Weekly charts ===
Chart (1986)	Peak position
Belgium (Ultratop 50 Flanders)	7
France (SNEP)	18
Netherlands (Dutch Top 40)	9
Netherlands (Single Top 100)	15
Sweden (Sverigetopplistan)	8
US Dance Club Songs (Billboard)	10
US Hot R&B/Hip-Hop Songs (Billboard)	66
West Germany (GfK)	20

=== Year-end charts ===
Chart (1986)	Position
Belgium (Ultratop Flanders)	68
Netherlands (Dutch Top 40)	87
