= Adventure Time (album) =

Studio album by The Elvis Brothers
- Released: 1985
- Recorded: Fifth Floor Recorders in Cincinnati, OH
- Genre: Rock/pop
- Length: 34:56
- Label: Portrait Records
- Producer: Adrian Belew

The Elvis Brothers chronology
Movin' Up (1983)	Adventure Time (1985)	Now Dig This (1992)

Singles from Adventure Time
- 1. "Somebody Call The Police" Released: 1985; 2. "Don't Take My Guns Away" Released: 1985

Adventure Time is the second album by the rock/pop trio The Elvis Brothers. The album was released in 1985 on Portrait Records. The basic tracks and first mixes were recorded at Fifth Floor Recorders in Cincinnati, OH, with producer Adrian Belew. The redubbing and remixing were done by George Tutko and John Boylan at Cherokee Studios in Los Angeles.

The album was reissued in 1995 by Sony/Recession Records with their debut album Movin' Up, with both albums on a single CD.

== Reception ==
- Writing for AllMusic, Stewart Mason said "There's perhaps a little too much of the standard mid-'80s production gloss, but not so much that the largely impressive batch of rootsy pop songs is overwhelmed."
- Ira Robbins wrote: "Adrian Belew's more complex production of Adventure Time doesn't dampen the E-Bros.' lighthearted spirit."

== Tracks ==
1. Burnin' Desire
2. Somebody Call The Police
3. Don't Take My Guns Away
4. Holy Moly
5. Crosswinds
6. Count To Three
7. I Wonder Why
8. Akiko Shinoda
9. Chin Up
10. Big Ideas

== Personnel ==
- Rob Elvis (Rob Newhouse) - guitar, vocals
- Graham Elvis (Graham Walker) - bass, vocals
- Brad Elvis (Brad Steakley) - drums
