= Adventure Time (1967 TV series) =

- Genre: children's adventure
- Country of origin: Canada
- Original language: English
- No. of episodes: 10

Production
- Running time: 30 minutes

Original release
- Network: CBC Television
- Release: 21 April 1967 – 28 June 1968

Adventure Time is a Canadian children's adventure television series which aired on CBC Television in 1967 and 1968.

== Scheduling ==
The 1967 run of the series was broadcast Fridays at 5:00 p.m. (Eastern) from 21 April to 23 June featuring episodes such as "Caught in the Net", "The Dragon of Pendragon Hall", "The Missing Note" and "One Wish Too Many."

The following year's run was aired Wednesday to Friday at 4:30 p.m. from 13 to 28 June 1968 and featured episodes such as "Eagle Rock", "John of the Fair", "Peril for the Guy" and "Riders of the New Forest".
