= Saints & Sinners (heavy metal band) =

Canadian glam metal band

- Origin: Montreal, Quebec, Canada
- Genres: Glam metal
- Years active: 1991–1993
- Labels: Aquarius (Canada); Savage (United States)
- Past members: Rick Hughes; Jeff Salem; Stephane Dufour; Martin Bolduc; Jesse Bradman; Ange E. Curcio

Saints & Sinners was a short-lived Canadian glam metal band from Montreal, Quebec.

== Biography ==
The band was formed in 1991 by Sword vocalist Rick Hughes. The other five members were guitarist Stéphane Dufour (who later joined Éric Lapointe's band), bassist Martin Bolduc, drummers Jeff Salem and Angelo Curico, and keyboardist Jesse Bradman (formerly of Night Ranger, Aldo Nova, and UFO). The band released one album, the eponymous Saints & Sinners in 1992, produced by Aldo Nova and released via Aquarius Records (which had released Sword material). The band disbanded in 1993.

== Band members ==
- Rick Hughes – vocals
- Jeff Salem – drums
- Ange E. Curcio – drums
- Stéphane Dufour – guitar, backing vocals
- Martin "Marty" Bolduc – bass, backing vocals
- Jesse Bradman – keyboards, backing vocals

== Discography ==
=== Studio albums ===
- Saints & Sinners (1992)
