= Saint Sinner =

Saint Sinner may refer to:

- Saint Sinner (comics), a comic book series published by Marvel Comics and created by Clive Barker
- Saint Sinner (film), a 2002 television movie also created by Clive Barker
- Saint Sinner (album), a 2024 album by Elsy Wameyo
