= Blood on the Bricks (Aldo Nova album) =

Studio album by Aldo Nova
- Released: 1991
- Recorded: 1990–1991
- Studios: Encore Studios, Burbank, CA, Le Studio, Morin Heights, Montr, Sanctuary Sound, NJ, The Asylum, Montreal, Canada, The Jacksons Studio, Euc
- Genres: Hard rock, glam metal
- Length: 48:26
- Label: Jambco Records/Mercury
- Producers: Aldo Nova, Jon Bon Jovi

Aldo Nova chronology
Twitch (1985)	Blood on the Bricks (1991)	A Portrait of Aldo Nova (1991)

Blood on the Bricks is the fourth studio album by Canadian singer, songwriter and multi-instrumentalist Aldo Nova, for which he signed to Jon Bon Jovi's Jambco Records. It was his first album in 6 years. The album featured fewer outside writers than his previous record, Twitch. The songs were mostly written by Nova and Jon Bon Jovi, with help from Jim Vallance and Rick Hughes of Canadian metal band Sword.

== Track listing ==
- All songs written by Aldo Nova and Jon Bon Jovi, except where noted.
1. "Blood on the Bricks" – 4:54
2. "Medicine Man" – 4:49
3. "Bang Bang" – 4:27
4. "Someday" (Bon Jovi, Rick Hughes, Nova) – 5:08
5. "Young Love" (Bon Jovi, Nova, Jim Vallance) – 4:16
6. "Modern World" – 4:33
7. "This Ain't Love" – 5:05
8. "Hey Ronnie (Veronica's Song)" – 4:45
9. "Touch of Madness" – 4:24
10. "Bright Lights" (Nova) – 6:20
11. "Dance of the Dead" - 4:14 (Japanese Bonus Track)

== Reception ==
Professional ratings
Review scores
Source	Rating
AllMusic	2/5 stars

Bret Adams of AllMusic called the album "generally overproduced and noisy", saying that "most of the choruses are shout-along affairs." He ended his review by saying "Blood on the Bricks should have been better." Author Martin Popoff called the album "kickin'", and characterized it as a comeback of sorts after a 6-year absence, stating Blood on the Bricks "proves you're never really washed-up for good unless you're six feet under, especially if you've got Jon Bon Jovi as a buddy."

== Credits ==
=== Personnel ===
- Aldo Nova - vocals, acoustic and electric guitars, organ, keyboards, programming
- Steve Segal - steel and slide guitar
- Greg Mathieson - Hammond organ
- Daniel Barbe - piano
- Randy Jackson - bass guitar
- Kenny Aronoff - drums
- Aldo Mazza - percussion
- Jon Bon Jovi, Alan Jordan, Kip Lennon, Rick Virag - backing vocals
- The No Sweat Horns - horn section

=== Production ===
- Arranged and produced by Aldo Nova & Jon Bon Jovi
- Engineer: Rob Jacobs
- Assistant engineers: Nick DiDia, Steve Gallagher, Aldo Nova, Simon Pressey, Anthony Roberts
- Mixing: Nick DiDia, Rob Jacobs, Paul Lani
- Mastering: Bob Ludwig

== Charts ==
Chart (1991)	Peak position
Canada Top Albums/CDs (RPM)	59
Swedish Albums (Sverigetopplistan)	22
Swiss Albums (Schweizer Hitparade)	30
US Billboard 200	124
