= DJ Pope =

- Born: José David Rivera; Medellín, Colombia
- Genres: Reggaeton
- Occupation(s): DJ, musical producer

José David Rivera, known as DJ Pope or Pope, has been the partner and DJ of J Balvin for more than 15 years. He is involved with the reggaeton scene in Medellín, which is sometimes called the "Capital of Reggaeton" in Colombia.

== Biography ==
He lived for a few years in Connecticut, where he became more familiar with reggaeton, which he had already been listening to from DJ Playero. He decided to return to Medellín, where he bought his first DJ console with money that he had saved, and started throwing parties in his city and playing in nightclubs. He is part of a group called "Tres Pesos" in Medellín. He is also the founder of the record label 574 Studios, which takes its name from the telephone codes of Colombia (+57) and Medellín (+4). The label seeks to support young talent in Medellín and across Colombia, both in music and in other fields.
