= Subject...Aldo Nova =

Subject

Studio album by Aldo Nova
- Released: September 30, 1983
- Studios: Boogie Hotel Studio, Port Jefferson, NY, Kingdom Sound Studios, Syosset, NY, Power Station, New York, NY
- Genres: Hard rock; AOR
- Length: 41:20
- Label: Portrait
- Producer: Aldo Nova

Aldo Nova chronology
Aldo Nova (1982)	Subject (1983)	Twitch (1985)

Professional ratings
Review scores
Source	Rating
AllMusic	3/5 stars
Kerrang!	(very favorable)

Subject (also known as Subject...Aldo Nova, and Subject.....Aldo Nova) is the second studio album by Canadian rock musician Aldo Nova, released in 1983. It was certified Gold by the RIAA on December 5, 1994.

== Track listing ==
All songs written by Aldo Nova except where noted.

Side One

1. "Subject's Theme" – 1:36
2. "Armageddon (Race Cars)" – 0:25
3. "Armageddon" – 2:41
4. "Monkey on Your Back" – 4:35
5. "Hey Operator" (Carl Dixon) – 3:54
6. "Cry Baby Cry" – 4:17
7. "Victim of a Broken Heart" (Tony Bruno, Nova) – 4:19

Side Two

1. "Africa (Primal Love)" – 0:39
2. "Hold Back the Night" (Dwight Druick, Nova) – 4:48
3. "Always Be Mine" – 4:11
4. "All Night Long" – 3:41
5. "War Suite" – 1:26
6. "Prelude to Paradise" – 1:31
7. "Paradise" – 3:17

== Personnel ==
- Aldo Nova - vocals, guitar, bass, keyboards
- David Sikes - bass
- Steve Buslowe - bass
- Kevin Carlson - second guitar
- Neil Jason - bass
- Chuck Burgi - drums
- Bill Carmassi - drums
- Denis Chartrand - acoustic piano, string arrangement

== Charts ==
Chart (1983–84)	Peak position
Canada Top Albums/CDs (RPM)	41
Swedish Albums (Sverigetopplistan)	35
US Billboard 200	56

== Certifications ==
Region	Certification	Certified units/sales
Canada (Music Canada)	Gold	50,000^{^}
United States (RIAA)	Gold	500,000^{^}
^{^} Shipments figures based on certification alone.
