= Ellona Santiago =

Filipino singer

- Born: Ellona Rano Santiago; August 1, 1996 (age 30); Cavite City, Philippines
- Origin: San Lorenzo, California, U.S.
- Genres: Pop; R&B; soul
- Occupations: Singer
- Instruments: Vocals; piano
- Years active: 2011–present

Ellona Rano Santiago (born August 1, 1996) is a Filipino singer. She was a contestant on American television show The X Factor. In season 1, she was a part of the ten-member group InTENsity mentored by Paula Abdul which were the first contestant eliminated. Santiago returned in season 3, where she was mentored by Demi Lovato and was the eighth contestant eliminated.

== Early life ==
Ellona has been singing since the age of 3 and has joined dozens of talent shows. In 2011 Ellona won Ichiban Idol, where American Idol season 3 finalist Jasmine Trias was a guest judge. Ellona has had a successful YouTube channel with over 1,300,000 views in total.

Ellona started singing before she could speak. At the age of 3 she started singing and dancing for family gatherings. Her early training was taught by her mother, who used to sing to her even when she was still in her womb. Her older sisters and cousins also influenced her in honing her skills. As years go by, Ellona was enrolled by her parents to Barbizon Modeling School for professional training (2005–2006) in San Francisco, California. She performed at IPAAC Convention (International Performing Arts Academy) and placed Best in Talent in December 2006. At 10, she became the youngest cast member of the musical-comedy called “Amerikana” led by Fil-Am Singer-Actress-Comedienne Fe Delos Reyes who became her mentor. Ellona's professional vocal coach was Miriam Pantig who is also an International Singer-Actress.

Ellona is a member of Our Lady of Good Counsel Children's Church Choir in San Leandro, CA. Aside from sharing her voice; she is also the teen advocate for Project Resoled, a non-profit organization in which its core objective is to provide refurbished children's shoes to improve the mental, emotional, and physical health of impoverished children in developing countries such as Philippines. Since Ellona's involvement in 2012 with the organization, it has raised more awareness for different sectors and individuals to donate and participate in the program

== The X Factor ==
=== 2011: InTENsity ===
In 2011, at age 14, she took part in the inaugural season 1 of the American singing competition The X Factor. She auditioned solo failing to make it on her own. In bootcamp, she was reaccepted as part of a group made out of ten contestants put together for the purpose of competing in the groups category and thus being given a second chance. The group mentored by Paula Abdul included in addition to Ellona Santiago the following: Ma'at Bingham Shango, Nick Dean, Francesca Duncan, John Lindahl, Emily Michalak, Austin Percario, Arin Ray (who competed in season 2 as an individual contestant), Emily Wilson and Lauren Ashley.

In week 1, on October 25, 2011, InTENsity performed a mash-up of "The Clapping Song" and "Footloose" and were safe.

In week 2, on November 2, 2011, they performed a mash-up of "Kids in America" and "Party Rock Anthem". They received low public vote finishing in Bottom 2 alongside Stereo Hoggz, another Paula Abdul-mentored group. InTENsity were eliminated. Only Simon Cowell voted in their favor whereas all three other judges including Abdul voted to keep Stereo Hoggz. They became the second contestant eliminated. However InTENsity received more votes than The Stereo Hogzz meaning if Reid sent the result went to deadlock, InTENsity would have been saved and The Stereo Hogzz would have been eliminated.

==== Performances ====
–Contestant was in the bottom two and had to sing again in the final showdown
–Contestant was eliminated

Broadcast Date	Episode	Theme	Song Choice	Original Artist	Order	Result
September 22	Audition	Free choice	"When I Look at You"	Miley Cyrus	N/A	Through to Bootcamp
October 5	Bootcamp 1	Free Choice	"Cry Me a River"	Michael Bublé	10	Advanced to Bootcamp 2
October 6	Bootcamp 2	Group Performance	"I Have Nothing"	Whitney Houston	3	Eliminated but put into judges made group "InTENsity"
October 18	Live Show 1	Mentors Choice	"Footloose"/"The Clapping Song"	Kenny Loggins and Lincoln Chase	7	Safe
November 3	Live Show 2	American Themes	"Kids in America"/"Party Rock Anthem"	Kim Wilde and LMFAO	7	Bottom 2 – Final Showdown
November 4	Final Showdown	Save Me	"My Life Would Suck Without You"	Kelly Clarkson	2	Eliminated

=== 2013 ===
Ellona Santiago auditioned again for the third season of the program. Kelly Rowland described her audition as "unexpected" as she was very shy and modest at first but had put in so much fierceness and passion into her song, "Wings" by Little Mix. Judge and mentor Simon Cowell said to Ellona that "she was the contestant he wanted to work with the most." Simon Cowell did not recognize her until she told him that she was from InTENsity and that he referred to her as "the girl in the red jacket".

Ellona Santiago was picked in the Final 40, one of ten acts in the "Girls" category mentored by Demi Lovato. In the four-chair challenge, Ellona sang "Clarity" by Zedd. Lovato hesitated to put Santiago through to the next round, unsure of what to do stating "When I see this panel and the four seats over there, I can't see myself letting any of them go." Judge and mentor Simon Cowell argued saying that he strongly disagreed and that "she was probably the best voice that the girls category has ever had." The audience and Cowell began to rant urging Lovato to put her through. Lovato then made a decision to put her in her final 4, and switched out Jamie Pineda. She was chosen to be in the Final 16 that progressed through to the live shows and was chosen to be in Demi Lovato's top 3.

On the first live show, Ellona performed "Till the World Ends" by Britney Spears. Ellona received a standing ovation and high praise from the judges with judge Kelly Rowland announcing that Ellona was the one to watch out for in the competition. Once all of the acts in the girls category had performed their mentor Demi Lovato had to eliminate one of her four acts.. Demi chose to save Ellona first, sending her through to the top 13. Her performance in week 1 has received over 1.6 million views.

During the second live show on November 6, a technical glitch with the voting system occurred, causing the votes for the night to be thrown out. The top 13 performed again the following night, performing their save me songs instead of having a results show on November 7. Her song was "Titanium" and Ellona was safe.

On November 13, Ellona sang "I Wanna Dance With Somebody (Who Loves Me)" by Whitney Houston. During this performance Ellona slipped on the stage but recovered well. She received mixed reviews from the panel with judge Simon Cowell calling the first half of the performance absolutely mad, while female judges Kelly Rowland and Paulina Rubio praised her for her powerhouse vocals. During the results show on November 14, Ellona was announced safe.

Ellona performed "Burn" by Ellie Goulding for the fourth live show on November 20. She received negative comments from the judges, with Simon Cowell telling Ellona that she had lost her originality and it was as if he was watching an actress.

For "Big Band Night" (November 27), Ellona sang "Mamma Knows Best" by Jessie J. Ellona dedicated her performance to her sister, Julie Rose, who was diagnosed with stage 4 cancer. Ellona received high praise and standing ovations from all 4 judges. Simon Cowell praised Ellona, stating that her performance was a game changer and that she may very well win the whole show. Her mentor Demi Lovato agreed with Simon, stating that she always believed that Ellona could win. At the end of the night, judges Kelly Rowland, Paulina Rubio, and Demi Lovato announced Ellona as their choice for the top 3 for this week, and Simon Cowell voiced his opinion that Ellona's performance was the best of the night. On November 28, Ellona was announced safe.

Santiago sang "Applause" and If I Were a Boy" on the sixth live show. Ellona received positive feedback for both of her performances. Simon Cowell told Ellona after her performance of "Applause" that she really is into win the competition. On December 5, Ellona was eliminated as the act with the lowest number of votes. Judges Kelly Rowland, Paulina Rubio, and Demi Lovato were all shocked by the elimination, with Ellona's mentor Demi stating that "there has been a couple of contestants that have been sent home when they shouldn't have... Ellona is definitely one of them... She could've won this show." After being announced as a front runner to win, Ellona's elimination was deemed as one of the most shocking eliminations in the show's history.

==== Performances ====
Episode	Theme	Song	Original Artist	Order #	Result
Audition	Free choice	"Wings"	Little Mix	N/A	Advanced
Four-Chair Challenge	Free Choice	"Clarity"	Zedd ft. Foxes	10	Advanced
Top 16	Acts and Mentors Choice	"Till the World Ends"	Britney Spears	1	Saved by Demi Lovato
Top 13	Motown	"Baby Love"	The Supremes	5	N/A
Top 13 Redux	Save Me Songs	"Titanium"	David Guetta ft. Sia	5	Safe
Top 12	80's Night	"I Wanna Dance With Somebody (Who Loves Me)"	Whitney Houston	9	Safe
Top 10	British Invasion Night	"Burn"	Ellie Goulding	9	Safe
Top 8	Big Band Night	"Mamma Knows Best"	Jessie J	8	Safe
Top 6	Divas	"Applause"	Lady Gaga	4	Eliminated (6th)
Top 6	Unplugged songs	"If I Were a Boy"	Beyoncé	10	Eliminated (6th)

- Ellona was supposed to sing "Who You Are"by Jessie J and "Halo" by Beyoncé for the seventh live show on December 11.

== After The X Factor ==
After Ellona's time on The X Factor she has released 7 new covers on her YouTube channel.

- Read All About It by Emeli Sandé
- Unconditionally with Josh Levi by Katy Perry
- Pretty Hurts by Beyoncé
- Wherever You Will Go by The Calling
- Love Me Again by John Newman
- Latch by Disclosure and Sam Smith
- Chandelier by Sia

As well as her YouTube covers, she has also been featured on Ian Maxino's cover of Say Something by A Great Big World which can be found on his Soundcloud account.

Subsequently, upon Ellona’s achievement in her successful stint on The X Factor, and her participation in providing footwear to impoverished children in developing countries, the Mayor of San Lorenzo, Stephen Cassidy, has proclaimed on January 13, 2014, as “Ellona Santiago Day”. The City Council has commended her for being an inspirational representative for the youth in striving to achieve her dreams and in making a difference in the world.

Ellona hosted her first full concert on March 22, 2014, in the Brava Theatre. Josh Levi who placed 7th on the third season of The X Factor USA was also a special guest.

== Concerts ==
- "Inspired" Ellona Santiago live in concert (March 22, 2014)
