= Saints & Sinners (Saints & Sinners album) =

Studio album by Saints & Sinners
- Released: September 29, 1992
- Recorded: The Asylum, Montreal & Mix by Paul Northfield at Le Studio (Morin Heights)
- Genre: Hard rock, glam metal, heavy metal
- Length: 51:06
- Label: Aquarius (Canada); Savage (United States)
- Producer: Aldo Nova Executive Producers Lennie Petze & Pierre Paradis

Singles from Saints & Sinners
- 1. "Walk That Walk" Released: October 16, 1992; 2. "We Belong" Released: February 12, 1993; 3. "Takin' My Chances" Released: 1993

Saints & Sinners is a 1992 album, released by the Canadian glam metal band of the same name. "Walk That Walk", "We Belong" and "Takin' My Chances" were released as singles. The album was produced by Aldo Nova.

== Track listing ==
1. "Shake" – 4:10 (Aldo Nova, Stéphane Dufour)
2. "Rip It Up" – 4:45 (Aldo Nova, Jesse Bradman, Stéphane Dufour)
3. "Walk That Walk" – 4:40 (David Sikes, Jesse Bradman, B. Giles)
4. "Takin' My Chances" – 5:36 (Aldo Nova, André Pessis, Jesse Bradman)
5. "Kiss the Bastards" – 5:03 (Jon Bon Jovi, Rachel Bolan, Aldo Nova)
6. "Wheels of Fire" – 3:51 (Aldo Nova)
7. "Lesson of Love" – 4:17 (Aldo Nova, Jesse Bradman)
8. "We Belong" – 4:42 (Rick Hughes, Stéphane Dufour)
9. "Frankenstein" – 9:57 (Aldo Nova, Jesse Bradman, Stéphane Dufour)
10. "Slippin' into Darkness" – 4:18 (Aldo Nova)

== Personnel ==
=== Saints & Sinners ===
- Rick Hughes - vocals
- Stephane Dufour - guitars and background vocals
- Jesse Bradman - keyboards and background vocals
- Martin Bolduc - bass and background vocals
- Ange E. Curcio - drums
- Jeff Salem - drums

=== Additional personnel ===
- Aldo Nova - Keyboards, programming, additional acoustic guitars
- Alan Jordan - background vocals
- Michael Larocque - bass
- Tim Harrington - bass
- Alan Abrahms - bass
- Daniel Hughes - drums
- Peter Barbeau - drums

== Production ==
- Lennie Petze - executive producer
- Produced by Aldo Nova
- Paul Northfield - engineer, mixing
- Simon Pressey - assistant engineer and mixing
- Bob Ludwig - mastering
