= Portrait Records =

American record label

- Parent company: Sony Music Entertainment
- Founded: 1976; 50 years ago
- Distributor: Sony Masterworks
- Genre: Various (1976–1986); Jazz (1988–1990): Hard rock; heavy metal; (1999–2002); Classical crossover (2013–present)
- Country of origin: U.S.

Portrait Records is an American record label active from 1976 to the present, initially formed in association with Epic Records and later a division of Columbia Records. Portrait has had several incarnations each emphasizing different styles of music ranging from pop-rock, to jazz and heavy metal and most recently classical crossover acts. Notable artists Cyndi Lauper and Sade signed with Portrait, but their contracts were absorbed by Epic after that incarnation of the label was shuttered.

== History & Overview ==
Portrait began in 1976 as a sister label of Epic; its initial signings were Joan Baez, Burton Cummings, and the McCrarys. Cummings' "Stand Tall" was the lead-off single. Baez's Blowin' Away album and the McCrarys' self-titled debut bowed in early 1977. The label design was similar to that of Columbia's singles; design on it was in grey tones, while the logo was handwritten orange with a red outline. This was also the launch of Epic/Portrait/Associated (EPA) under the CBS moniker.

Heart was an early success for Portrait. Initially Heart was signed with small Canadian independent label Mushroom Records, but left after a dispute in advertising their Dreamboat Annie album. The print advertisements featured a salacious double entendre which the band had not approved, and which led some fans to think that the sisters Ann and Nancy Wilson were incestuous lesbians. Portrait quickly signed Heart to a contract, and released the single "Barracuda" before Little Queen was to hit the shelves. The McCrarys also scored big with their 1978 single "You" for Prestige.

By 1979, however, Epic was looking to consolidate some of its less commercially successful sub-labels and effectively folded Epic and Portrait together as a single company. In 1980, only Heart was picked up from Portrait; releasing Bébé le Strange, after which they took a two-year hiatus, releasing Private Audition in 1982.

Baez left the label after the release of her 1979 Honest Lullaby album; she later admitted in her 1987 memoir, And a Voice to Sing With, that she regretted signing with the label, describing her having left her previous label (A&M) for Portrait as "the stupidest career move I ever made".

In 1982, the label was relaunched again tapping into the new wave scene and other music not gaining any airplay. It signed artists such as Altered Images, Aldo Nova, Accept, Arc Angel, Hawaiian Pups, The Elvis Brothers, Eddy Grant, Orion the Hunter, The Producers, Saga, and Peter Baumann (formerly of Tangerine Dream). The label was completely black but the red logo stayed intact.

Portrait found major success with Cyndi Lauper and Sade, both signed in 1983. Aldo Nova did make some headway with the songs "Fantasy" and "Monkey on Your Back" from his Subject...Aldo Nova album. Saga also found success with the songs "On the Loose" and "Wind Him Up", which would gain the band gold and platinum albums worldwide. In 1985, British singer Toyah released her album Minx on Portrait. In 1986, British guitarist and songwriter Bill Nelson released Getting the Holy Ghost Across (US title: On a Blue Wing) on the label.

By the end of 1986, the only act making money on this label was Lauper. Her album True Colors went platinum, but it wasn't enough to keep the label afloat. At the end of 1986, Portrait was shuttered again.

In 1988, the label re-emerged once more but as a contemporary jazz outfit, with signings as diverse as Stanley Clarke, Ornette Coleman, Prime Time and Japanese import T-Square. The logo changed dramatically. This time the label had two: the primary one was a painted P with the word "portrait" in a red block, while the secondary one was an outline drawing of a woman. This artwork was gone by 1990.

Epic did try to make the label work one more time: in 1999, it was relaunched through Columbia Records as a hard-rock/metal label, signing Ratt, Cinderella, Great White, the Union Underground, and Mars Electric. In 2000, Iron Maiden signed with Portrait in conjunction with Columbia Records in the US. Finally, after trying so hard to keep it afloat, Portrait dissolved in 2002 after the US release of Iron Maiden's Rock in Rio album.

In late 2012, Sony Masterworks reactivated the label as a classical music imprint with its first artists The Piano Guys on the newly relaunched imprint, and subsequently transferring Jackie Evancho to Portrait from the Columbia label.

== Artists ==
=== Through Epic ===
- Burton Cummings
- Saga
- Heart
- Cyndi Lauper
- Eddy Grant
- The Elvis Brothers
- Bill Nelson
- Sade
- Joan Baez
- Toyah
- Accept

=== Through Columbia ===
- Cinderella
- Great White
- Ratt
- The Union Underground

=== Through Sony Masterworks ===
- Jackie Evancho
- Natalie Imbruglia
- The Piano Guys
- Yanni

== See also ==
- List of record labels
