= Alex Lambert =

American singer-songwriter

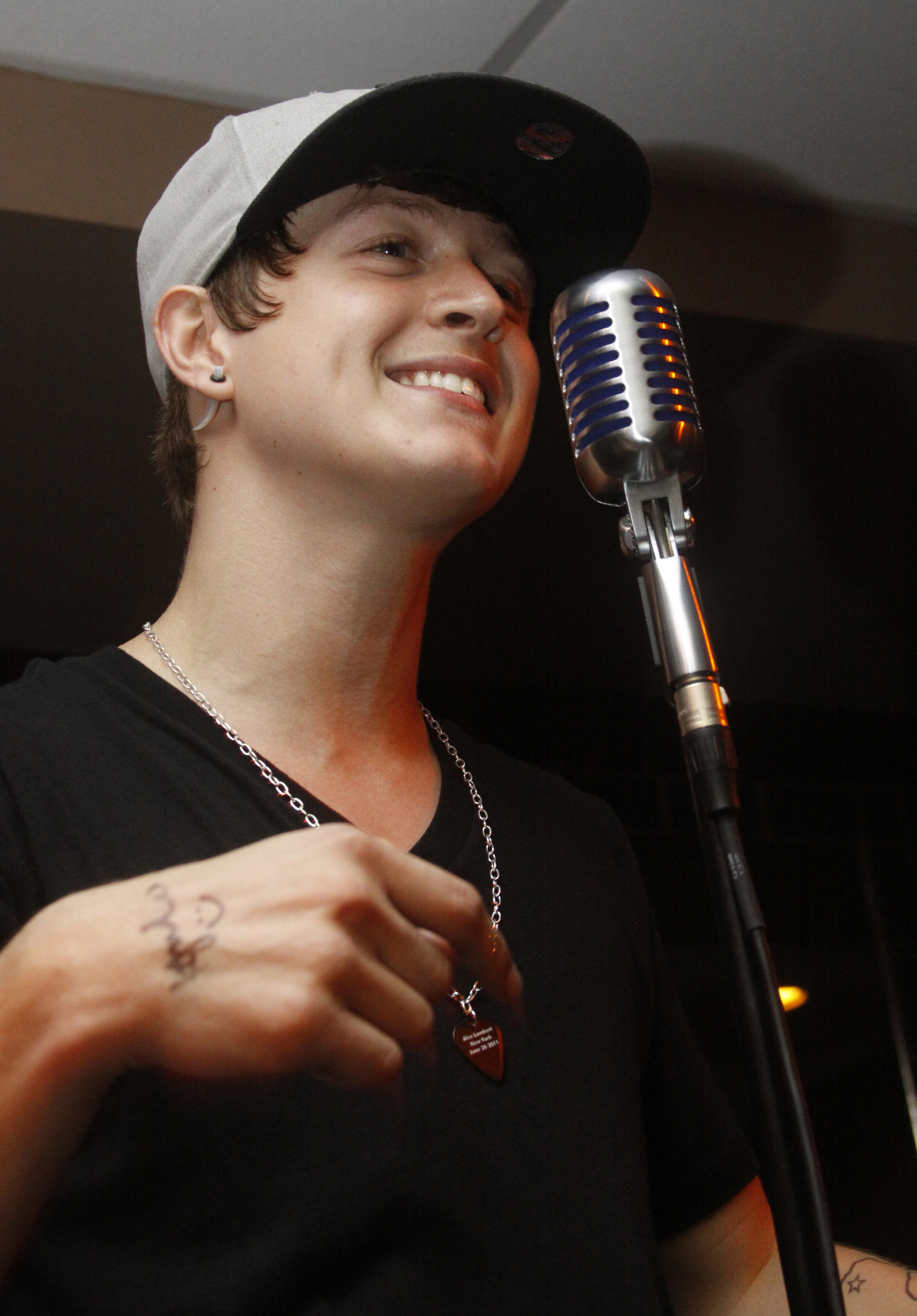
- Alex Lambert at a gig at Smith's Bar in New York, June 26, 2011

Background information
- Born: Alexander Don Lambert; December 10, 1990 (age 35); North Richland Hills, Texas, United States
- Genres: Pop, R&B, blue-eyed soul
- Occupation: Singer-songwriter
- Instruments: Vocals, guitar, ukulele, piano
- Years active: 2009–present

Alexander Don Lambert (born December 10, 1990) is an American singer-songwriter from North Richland Hills, Texas, who was a semi-finalist on the ninth season of American Idol and starred on a web show, If I Can Dream.

== Early life ==
Lambert was born and raised in North Richland Hills, Texas. He is the son of Harold Lambert and Gwen Henderson-Lambert and has six siblings.

Lambert attended Richland High School, where he played junior varsity and varsity football and was a member of the 2008 7-on-7 state and national championship team.

Lambert started singing and playing the guitar at the age of nine; at sixteen, he began taking his music more seriously and writing his own songs, citing his grandfather, a country musician who worked with Conway Twitty and Willie Nelson, as his main inspiration. Prior to auditioning for American Idol, Lambert was self-taught, both vocally and on guitar, and had only played in front of small coffee shop audiences for friends and family with his band, Hands that Hurt.

Lambert's musical influences include The Beatles, Elvis Presley, Stevie Ray Vaughan, Bob Marley, James Morrison, John Mayer and John Legend.

== American Idol ==
Lambert auditioned for the ninth season of American Idol on August 25, 2009, in Dallas, Texas, at the encouragement of his mother, and earned a golden ticket to Hollywood Week.

During Hollywood Week, Lambert sang "Sunday Morning" by Maroon 5 in the first round, "Dreams" by Fleetwood Mac in the group round along with Mary Powers, Hope Johnson, Erynne Hundley and Margo May, and "I'm Yours" by Jason Mraz for his final solo performance. Although Lambert's group, The Dreamers, gave a rocky performance, his ukulele-accompanied final solo was well received by the judges, and he secured a spot among the Top 24 finalists.

On the first night of the live semi-finals, Lambert sang "Wonderful World" by James Morrison, giving a performance that was described as "uncomfortable" by Simon Cowell due to Lambert's nerves; however, all the judges complimented his voice and tone, and Lambert moved into the Top 20. In the next round, Lambert sang "Everybody Knows" by John Legend, which earned praise from the judges. Lambert was eliminated following his performance of "Trouble" by Ray LaMontagne during the Top 16 round, in what was labeled one of the most shocking elimination nights in the series' history. The LA Times has ranked Lambert 57th in their list of the top 120 American Idol contestants, selected from seasons 1 to 9 of the show.

=== Performances ===
Week #	Theme	Song choice	Original artist	Order #	Result
Audition	Auditioner's Choice	"Everybody Knows"	John Legend	N/A	Advanced
Hollywood	First Solo	"Sunday Morning"	Maroon 5	N/A	Advanced
Hollywood	Group Round	"Dreams"	Fleetwood Mac	N/A	Advanced
Hollywood	Second Solo	"I'm Yours"	Jason Mraz	N/A	Advanced
Top 24 (12 Men)	Billboard Hot 100 Hits	"Wonderful World"	James Morrison	10	Safe
Top 20 (10 Men)	Billboard Hot 100 Hits	"Everybody Knows"	John Legend	4	Safe
Top 16 (8 Men)	Billboard Hot 100 Hits	"Trouble"	Ray LaMontagne	2	Eliminated

== Post-Idol ==
Immediately after his elimination, Lambert was invited to appear on The Ellen DeGeneres Show, where he discussed his American Idol experience and sang "Let Me Love You" by Mario, the song he had initially intended to perform during the Top 16 round. Backstage on Ellen, Lambert was filmed playing "Butterflies", an original song written the day after his elimination. He also made an appearance on Good Day Texas, performing another original song, "I Been Workin'".

Lambert's elimination continued to create a stir, due in large part to an online petition. The petition called for his reinstatement to the show and was signed by over 19,000 people, including notable celebrities like Demi Moore. The outpouring of support caught the attention of 19 Entertainment executive Simon Fuller, the creator of American Idol and new venture If I Can Dream.

== If I Can Dream ==
On April 1, 2010, Lambert joined then-cast members Giglianne Braga, Justin Gaston, Ben Elliott, Kara Killmer and Amanda Phillips on If I Can Dream, a web reality series that followed aspiring artists as they pursued their dreams in Hollywood. His entrance was watched live by over a million internet viewers.

While on If I Can Dream, Lambert collaborated with numerous notable songwriters and music producers, and completed multiple tracks for inclusion on an album. Several demos were released, but most were kept under wraps. "Dream With My Eyes Open", one of the first songs Lambert wrote and demoed, became the theme song of the show i, replacing Elvis Presley's "If I Can Dream" in episode eleven.

Notable performances include the U.S. Open of Surfing at Huntington Beach, the 2010 Sunset Strip Music Festival and Elvis Week in Graceland. Celebrity appearances include Don't Forget the Lyrics!, celebrity presenter at the 2010 Young Hollywood Awards and a "Star Spangled Banner" performance at Dodger Stadium.

Lambert had a romantic relationship with a house guest country-pop singer Veronica Ballestrini. The couple broke up in the Winter of 2010.

Since the end of the show, Lambert remained in Los Angeles and continued to work with 19 Entertainment songwriters and producers. Lambert has performed in support of several charities including Stickam Live for Japan Relief and Breast Cancer Awareness.

== "I Didn't Know" ==
"I Didn't Know", a soulful pop song written by Lambert with Nasri Atweh and Adam Messinger, was selected and made into a music video by Clear Channel and 19 Entertainment, and then released on July 26, 2010, through iHeartRadio, then across the web. The video features Lambert playing at several Play Me I'm Yours piano art installations across the five boroughs of New York City, including prominent tourist locations such as the Brooklyn Bridge, Coney Island and Times Square. The 15th Annual Webby Awards selected Lambert's "I Didn’t Know" music video as an Official Webby Honoree in the Online Film & Video: Best Editing category.

== Songwriting ==
Lambert saw his first significant songwriting placements in 2012. On June 26, 2012, "Trouble," a song co-written by Lambert and busbee was released as The X-Factor finalist Chris Rene's second single. In September 2012, Lambert had his second studio album writing credit when his original song "What Makes You So Beautiful" (later shortened to "Beautiful"), co-written with Toby Gad, was included on Carly Rae Jepsen's album Kiss.
