= Northern Guilford High School =

American public school in North Carolina

Coordinates: 36.2090°N 79.8067°W

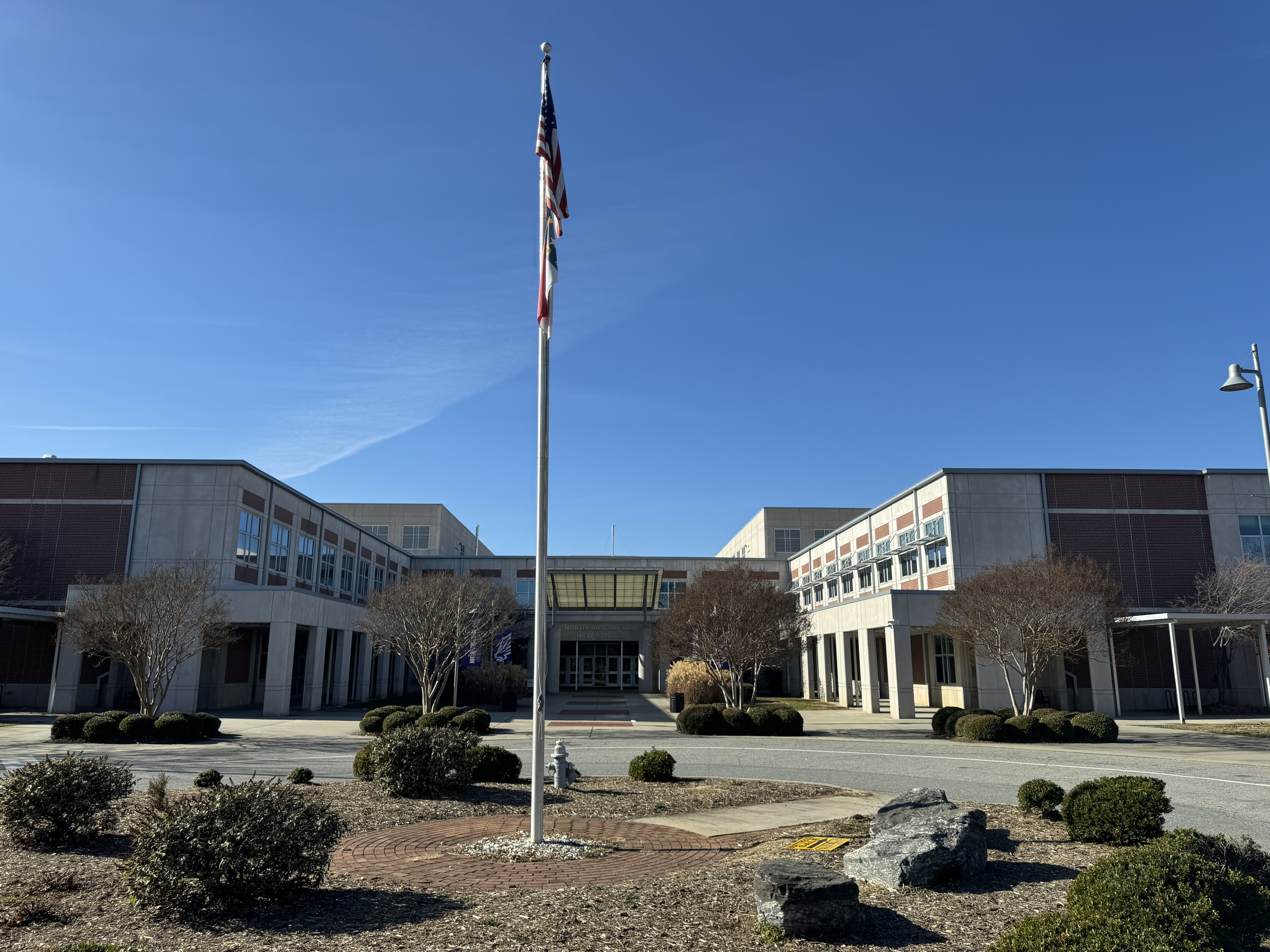
- Northern Guilford High School, December 2023

Location
- 7101 Spencer Dixon Road; Greensboro, North Carolina 27455; United States

Information
- Type: Public
- Established: 2008 (18 years ago)
- School district: Guilford County Schools
- CEEB code: 341603
- Principal: Louis Galiotti
- Teaching staff: 62.65 (FTE)
- Grades: 9–12
- Enrollment: 1,291 (2023-2024)
- Student to teacher ratio: 20.61
- Campus size: 285,052 square feet (26,482.2 m^{2})
- Colors: Purple, black, and silver
- Mascot: Nighthawks
- Website: northernhs.gcsnc.com

Northern Guilford High School is a public high school located in Greensboro, North Carolina. It is situated in proximity to NC Highway 150, which connects to Browns Summit and to Summerfield.

It opened its doors to students on January 29, 2008. The school was built because of the overcrowding of Northwest Guilford and Northeast Guilford high schools.

== Athletics ==
=== Basketball ===
In 2009, the Northern Guilford boys basketball team finished 30–3 and won the 3A state title. However, they were later stripped of their state title, due to residency issues on the team.

In 2017 and 2018, the Northern Guilford girls basketball team won back-to-back 3A state championships.

=== Football ===
The Northern Guilford football won three consecutive NCHSAA 3AA state championships from 2010 to 2012, defeating Crest High School in 2010 and 2011, and Charlotte Catholic in the 2012 championship game. They also won the 2014 3AA state championship, defeating Weddington High School. In 2025, Northern lost to Watauga in a close game that was 43-42. If they won they would have played in the 6A championship

=== Golf ===
In 2010, the Northern Guilford boys golf team won the NCHSAA 3A state championship.

=== Baseball ===
The Northern Guilford baseball team won the 2017 NCHSAA 3A state championship.

=== Track & Field ===
The boys outdoor track & field team won the 2013 NCHSAA 3A state championship.

=== Wrestling ===
In 2020, the Northern Guilford wrestling team won the NCHSAA 3A dual team state championship by defeating Enka High School. The Nighthawks defeated a favored Enka in the dual team finals at the Greensboro Coliseum.

== Notable alumni ==
- Keenan Allen (2010) — professional football player, six-time Pro Bowl wide receiver
- Elissa Cunane (2018) — professional basketball player
- Maurice Harris (2011) — professional football player
- Chris McCain (2010) — professional football player
- T. J. Logan (2013) — professional football player
