= Brandon Jones (actor) =

American actor, musician, and producer (born 1988)

- Born: Brandon William Jones; May 7, 1988 (age 38); Greensboro, North Carolina, U.S.
- Other name: Brandon W. Jones
- Occupations: Actor; musician; producer; model
- Years active: 2009–present

Brandon William Jones (born May 7, 1988) is an American actor, musician, model, and producer. He is best known for his role as Liam in Lie to Me, Andrew Campbell in Pretty Little Liars, Liam Olmstead in The Fosters, and Charlie Russell in CSI: Crime Scene Investigation.

== Early life and career ==
Jones was born in Greensboro, North Carolina and was raised in the nearby town of McLeansville by parents Kimberly and Reid Jones. At Northeast Guilford High School, Jones was involved in sports as a member of the football, track, and wrestling teams. In early 2009, Jones drove cross country from his East Coast home to move to Los Angeles and began acting soon after.

Jones shot with photographer Bruce Weber for the 2010 Abercrombie & Fitch holiday campaign. He is also featured as the lead vocalist on the 2011 single "Wanna Be Known" by German electronic music duo York.

In October 2011, it was announced that Jones would be joining CSI: Crime Scene Investigation, playing the role of Charlie Russell, the son of D.B. Russell (played by Ted Danson). E! Online reported in early August 2012 that Jones would guest star on Pretty Little Liars as the role of Andrew Campbell. He appeared in the web series If I Can Dream alongside Justin Gaston.

Jones also appeared in Unbreakable Kimmy Schmidt as Cyndee's fiancé.

== Personal life ==
In 2017, Jones pleaded no contest to misdemeanor charges of assault with a firearm. The incident stemmed from a 2015 altercation with a neighbor, where Jones pulled out a handgun. The actor had a similar incident in 2016, when he waved a knife in his neighbor's face. Jones served a 180-day sentence, along with 30 days of community service and anger management classes.

== Filmography ==
=== Film ===
Year	Title	Role	Notes
2011	Eye of the Storm	Cigazombie	Short film; also executive producer
2011	Born to Race	Football player	Direct-to-video
2013	Killer Reality	Matt	Television film
2014	Hello, My Name Is Frank	Kevin Bowman	
2014	Too Much Clay Matthews	Hank	Short film
2016	Courting Des Moines	Damian	
2016	Monolith	Ted	
2016	Hopeless, Romantic	Matt	Television movie
2016	Advance & Retreat	Bryce	Television movie
2019	Boy Eats Girl: A Zombie Love Story	Boy Zombie	Short film

=== Television ===
Year	Title	Role	Notes
2009	90210	Obnoxious senior	Episode: "Sit Down, You're Rocking the Boat"
2010	Parental Control	Himself	Contestant; episode: "Joelle"
2010	Law & Order: LA	Logan Rudman	Episode: "Harbor City"
2010–2011	Lie to Me	Liam	3 episodes
2011	CSI: NY	Frat boy	Episode: "Food for Thought"
2011	Switched at Birth	Zane	Episode: "Dance Amongst Daggers"
2011–2012	CSI: Crime Scene Investigation	Charlie Russell	4 episodes
2012	The Finder	Kevin Montgomery	Episode: "Bullets"
2012	Jane by Design	Christopher	Episode: "The Getaway"
2012	Victorious	Moose	Episode: "Three Girls and a Moose"
2012	Supernatural	Michael Wheeler	Episode: "Bitten"
2012	2 Broke Girls	Jebediah	Episode: "And the Three Boys with Wood"
2013–2015	Pretty Little Liars	Andrew Campbell	12 episodes
2013–2015	The Fosters	Liam Olmstead	6 episodes
2014	The Middle	Brian	Episode: "The Award"
2014	Cabot College	Brian	Episode: "Gerald"; unaired
2015–2016	Unbreakable Kimmy Schmidt	Brandon Yeagley	2 episodes
2016	The Big Bang Theory	The Flash	Episode: "The Dependence Transcendence"
2017	Doubt	Brandon Decker	2 episodes
2018	Empire	Choreographer	Episode: "Had It From My Father"
2020	The Unicorn	Ted	Episode: "No Matter What the Future Brings"

=== Web ===
Year	Title	Role	Notes
2010	If I Can Dream	Himself	Recurring
2011	First Day 2: First Dance	JT Fox	6 episodes
2013	Trainers	Scott	3 episodes

== Discography ==
- "Wanna Be Known" (York featuring Brandon Jones) (2011)
- "In the Moment" (featuring Jade Villalon) (2012)
