= Jaylin Davis =

American baseball player (born 1994)

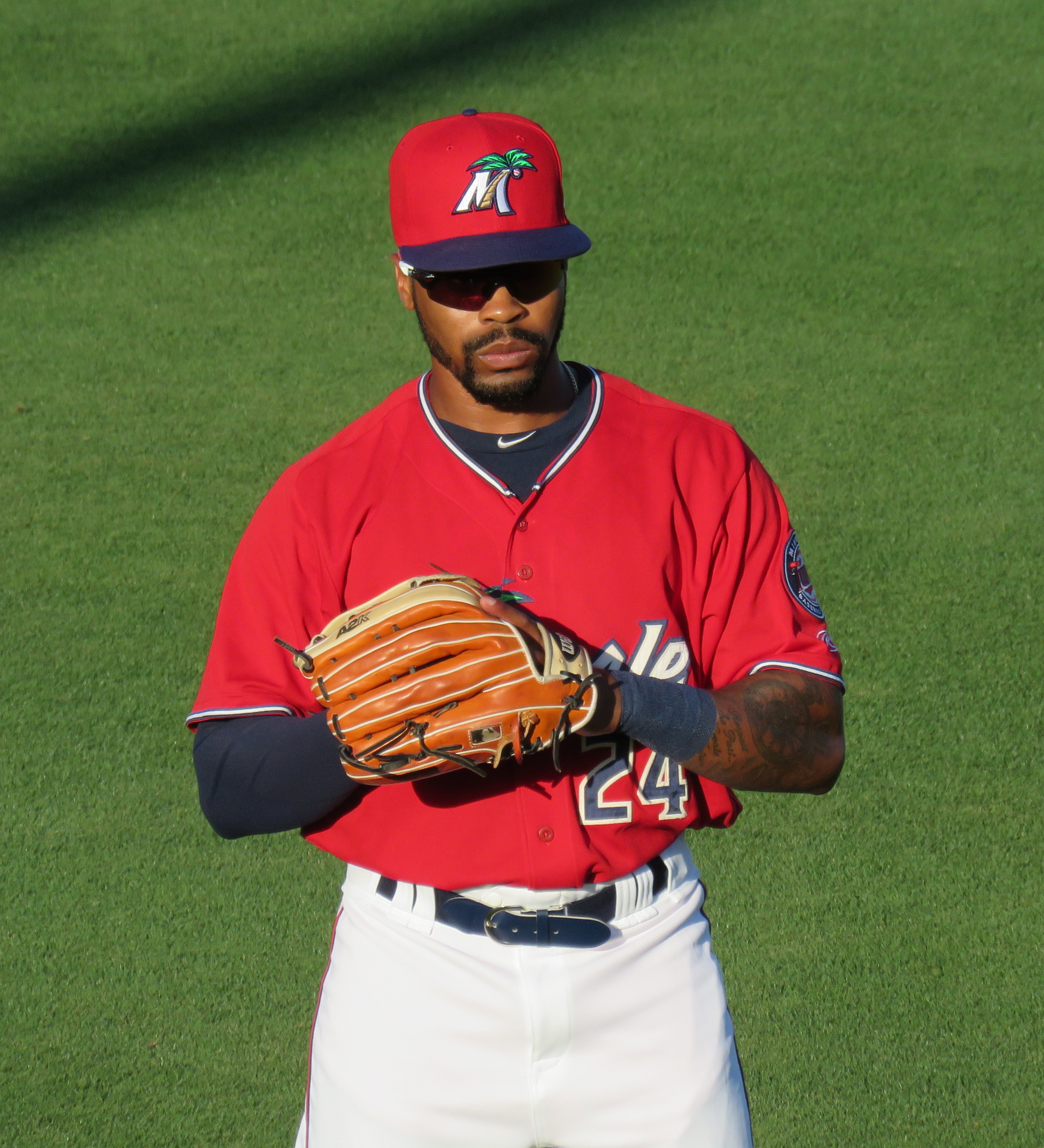
- Davis with the Fort Myers Miracle
- Outfielder
- Born: July 1, 1994 (age 32); Greensboro, North Carolina, U.S.
- Batted: Right Threw: Right

MLB debut
- September 4, 2019, for the San Francisco Giants

Last MLB appearance
- August 13, 2022, for the Boston Red Sox

MLB statistics
- Batting average: .207
- Home runs: 2
- Runs batted in: 6
- Stats at Baseball Reference

Teams
- San Francisco Giants (2019–2021); Boston Red Sox (2022)

Jaylin Malik Davis (born July 1, 1994) is an American former professional baseball outfielder. He played in Major League Baseball (MLB) for the San Francisco Giants and Boston Red Sox. He played college baseball for Appalachian State University then was drafted by the Minnesota Twins in the 24th round of the 2015 MLB draft.

== Amateur career ==
Davis attended Northeast Guilford High School in McLeansville, North Carolina, where he had a .453 batting average as a sophomore, .468 as a junior and .483 as a senior. He was all-state and conference player of the year in his senior year.

Davis attended Appalachian State University, where he majored in health promotion and played college baseball. In 2013, he was a Louisville Slugger freshman all-American, and was named the Southern Conference freshman of the year. He was selected by the Minnesota Twins in the 24th round of the 2015 MLB draft.

== Professional career ==
=== Minnesota Twins ===
Davis spent his first professional season in 2016 with the rookie-level Elizabethton Twins and Single–A Cedar Rapids Kernels, registering a .255/.341/.523 slash line with 16 home runs and 41 RBIs over 64 games. He played in 2017 with Cedar Rapids and the High–A Fort Myers Miracle, slashing .253/.303/.416 with 15 home runs, 66 RBIs, and 147 strikeouts in 125 games.

He played in 2018 with Fort Myers (with whom he was named a Florida State League All-Star) and the Double-A Chattanooga Lookouts, hitting .273/.347/.412 with 11 home runs, 53 RBIs, and 126 strikeouts in 120 games. After the 2018 season, he played in the Arizona Fall League.

Davis started 2019 with the Double-A Pensacola Blue Wahoos, earning Southern League All-Star honors, and was promoted to the Triple-A Rochester Red Wings during the season. In Rochester, Davis earned International League Player of The Month honors for the month of July.

=== San Francisco Giants ===
On July 31, 2019, the Twins traded Davis, Prelander Berroa, and Kai-Wei Teng to the San Francisco Giants in exchange for Sam Dyson. Following the trade, he was assigned to the Triple-A Sacramento River Cats of the Pacific Coast League. With three minor-league teams during 2019 he hit a combined .306/.397/.590 with 35 home runs, 10 stolen bases, and 94 RBIs while striking out 138 times in 468 at bats.

On September 4, 2019, the Giants selected Davis' contract and promoted him to the major leagues. He made his major-league debut that night versus the St. Louis Cardinals, hitting an infield single off of Michael Wacha. Davis hit his first major-league home run on September 25, a walk-off off of D. J. Johnson of the Colorado Rockies. For the 2019 season, he batted .167/.255/.238 in 42 at bats. In 2020 for the Giants, Davis batted .167/.167/.417 with a home run and an RBI in 12 at bats.

On April 11, 2021, Davis was placed on the 60-day injured list with left knee tendinitis. He was activated from the injured list on July 1. During the 2021 season for the Giants, Davis batted one-for-nine (0.111). With Triple-A Sacramento, he batted .230/.317/.503 with 34 runs, 11 home runs, and 34 RBIs in 161 at bats. He began the 2022 season with Sacramento and was designated for assignment on April 21.

=== Boston Red Sox ===
On April 28, 2022, Davis was claimed off waivers by the Boston Red Sox and assigned to the Triple-A Worcester Red Sox. He was added to Boston's active roster on April 29, and made his Red Sox debut on May 1. He split time between Worcester and Boston during the season, batting .203 in 88 minor-league games with Worcester, and .333 in 12 major-league games with Boston. On May 14, Davis was designated for assignment when Rich Hill was activated off of the COVID-19 injured list. On May 19, he cleared waivers and was sent outright to Triple-A Worcester.

Davis was selected back to the active roster on July 23 after Rafael Devers was placed on the injured list. On September 12, the Red Sox designated Davis for assignment to clear roster space for infielder Yu Chang. Davis was subsequently sent outright to Worcester on September 14, and elected free agency on October 6.

=== New York Mets ===
On February 24, 2023, Davis signed a minor league contract with the New York Mets organization. He played in 76 games split between the Single–A St. Lucie Mets and Triple–A Syracuse Mets, accumulating a .216/.333/.437 batting line with 14 home runs and 48 RBI. He was released by the Mets on July 16.

=== Milwaukee Milkmen ===
On May 1, 2024, Davis signed with the Milwaukee Milkmen of the American Association of Professional Baseball. In 77 games for Milwaukee, he batted .240/.383/.445 with 13 home runs, 48 RBI, and three stolen bases.

Davis made 21 appearances for Milwaukee in 2025, batting .167/.253/.205 with six RBI and two stolen bases.

=== York Revolution ===
On June 3, 2025, Davis was traded to the York Revolution of the Atlantic League of Professional Baseball in exchange for Matt Walker. In 67 appearances for the Revolution, he batted .238/.374/.514 with 17 home runs, 48 RBI, and 11 stolen bases. With York, Davis won the Atlantic League championship.

On January 12, 2026, Davis announced his retirement from professional baseball.

== Coaching Career ==
In 2026, he was named as a development coach for the ACL Rockies the rookie-level affiliate of the Colorado Rockies.
