= Brevin Allen =

American gridiron football player (born 2000)

Profile
- Position: Defensive end

Personal information
- Born: September 22, 2000 (age 26); Greensboro, North Carolina, U.S.
- Listed height: 6 ft 4 in (1.93 m)
- Listed weight: 265 lb (120 kg)

Career information
- High school: Northeast Guilford (NC)
- College: Campbell (2018–2022)
- NFL draft: 2023: undrafted

Career history
- Los Angeles Chargers (2023); Green Bay Packers (2024)*; New England Patriots (2024)*; Memphis Showboats (2025)*; Toronto Argonauts (2025)
- * Offseason or practice squad member only

Career NFL statistics
- Games played: 2
- Stats at Pro Football Reference
- Stats at CFL.ca

Brevin William T. Allen (born September 22, 2000) is an American professional football defensive end. He played college football at Campbell and was signed by the Los Angeles Chargers as an undrafted free agent.

== Early life ==
Allen was born on September 22, 2000. He attended Northeast Guilford High School in McLeansville, North Carolina, and lettered in football and basketball. He was named all-conference and all-area as a senior in football, but was an unranked recruit and committed to play college football for the FCS Campbell Fighting Camels.

== College career ==
Allen appeared in 10 of 11 games as a true freshman at Campbell in 2018, posting 11 tackles, two TFLs and one sack. He then earned second-team All-Big South honors in 2019 following a season in which he recorded 54 tackles, 11 TFLs and 5.5 sacks. In the COVID-19-shortened 2020 season, Allen played all four games and repeated as an All-Big South selection, having led the team's defensive line in tackles with 17.

Allen was named the Big South Defensive Player of the Year in 2021, having placed top 20 in the nation for TFLs (17.5) and sacks (9.5), setting the school record in the latter category while tying the record in the former; he also tallied 44 tackles while playing 11 games and was named all-conference and an All-American. In his final season, 2022, Allen was named second-team All-Big South despite playing only eight games, as he recorded 22 tackles, 7.5 TFLs and 4.5 sacks. He was invited to the East–West Shrine Bowl and to the Hula Bowl after the season, and finished as Campbell's all-time leader in sacks (20.5, tied) and TFLs (38.0).

== Professional career ==
Pre-draft measurables
Height	Weight	Arm length	Hand span	40-yard dash	10-yard split	20-yard split	Bench press
6 ft 3 1/8 in (1.91 m)	265 lb (120 kg)	34 1/8 in (0.87 m)	10 1/8 in (0.26 m)	4.85 s	1.75 s	2.69 s	24 reps
All values from Pro Day

=== Los Angeles Chargers ===
Allen was selected in the third round (19th overall) of the 2023 USFL draft by the Memphis Showboats. He went unselected in the 2023 NFL draft, but afterwards signed with the Los Angeles Chargers as an undrafted free agent. He was waived at the final roster cuts and afterwards re-signed to the practice squad. He was elevated to the active roster for their week one game against the Miami Dolphins and made his debut in the 36–34 loss, becoming both the first Northeast Guilford High School alumni and first Campbell Fighting Camel to play in an NFL game. He signed a reserve/future contract on January 11, 2024. He was waived on May 14, 2024.

=== Green Bay Packers ===
On August 7, 2024, Allen signed with the Green Bay Packers. He was released on August 27, 2024.

=== New England Patriots ===
On August 29, 2024, Allen was signed to the New England Patriots practice squad. He was released on September 3, 2024.

=== Memphis Showboats ===
On January 13, 2025, Allen signed with the Memphis Showboats of the United Football League (UFL). He was released on March 20, 2025.

=== Toronto Argonauts ===
On May 28, 2025, it was announced that Allen had signed with the Toronto Argonauts. On October 25, 2025, he was released.
