= Maurice Harris (American football) =

American football player (born 1992)

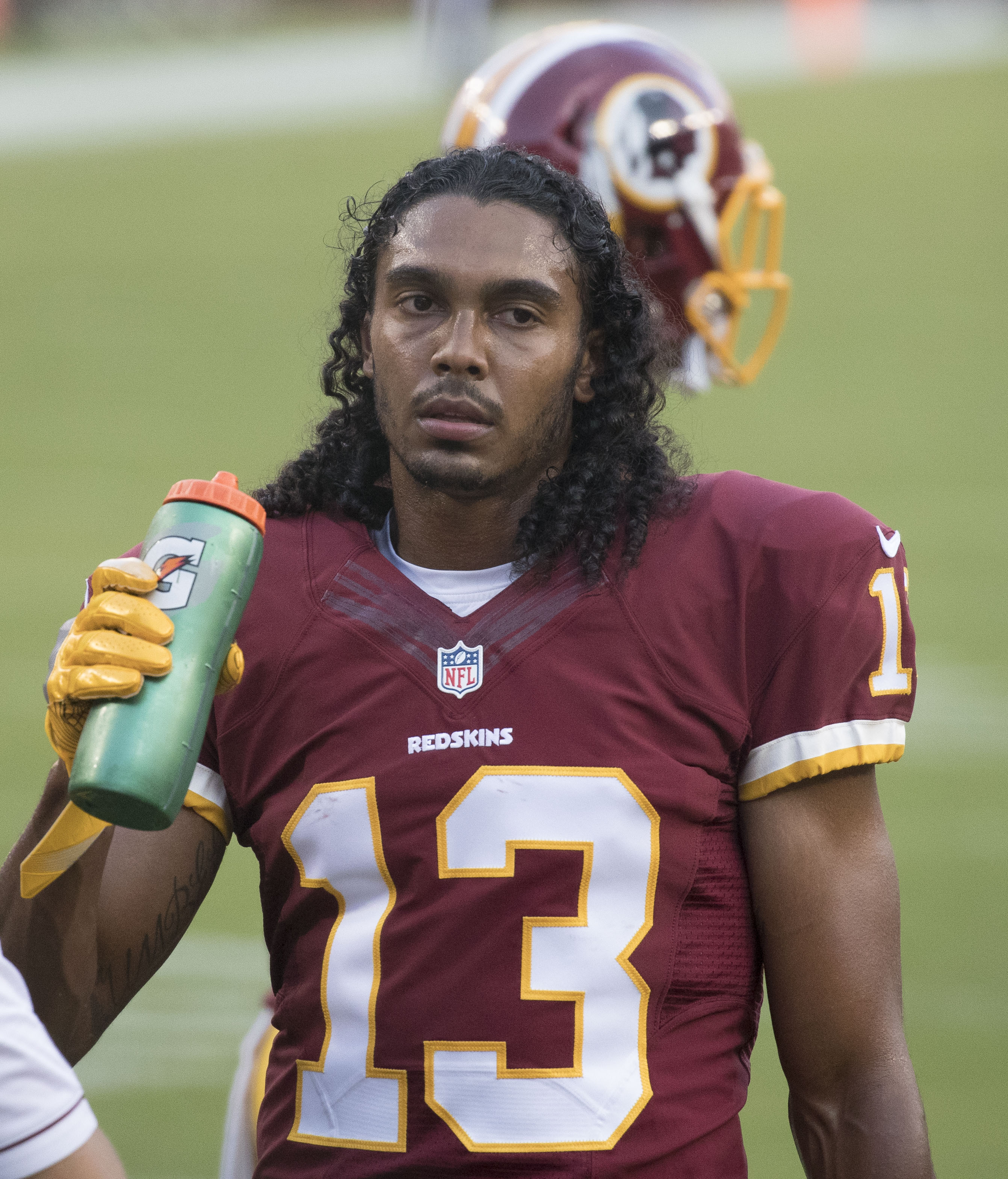
- Harris with the Washington Redskins in 2016

No. 13, 82
- Position: Wide receiver

Personal information
- Born: November 11, 1992 (age 33); Greensboro, North Carolina, U.S.
- Listed height: 6 ft 3 in (1.91 m)
- Listed weight: 205 lb (93 kg)

Career information
- High school: Northern Guilford (Greensboro)
- College: California (2012–2015)
- NFL draft: 2016: undrafted

Career history
- Washington Redskins (2016–2018); New England Patriots (2019)*; New Orleans Saints (2020)*; BC Lions (2021)*
- * Offseason or practice squad member only

Career NFL statistics
- Receptions: 40
- Receiving yards: 432
- Receiving touchdowns: 1
- Stats at Pro Football Reference

Maurice Lynell Harris (born November 11, 1992) is an American former professional football player who was a wide receiver in the National Football League (NFL). He played college football for the California Golden Bears and signed with the Washington Redskins as an undrafted free agent in 2016. Harris was also a member of the New England Patriots, New Orleans Saints, and BC Lions.

== Early life ==
Harris attended and played high school football at Northern Guilford High School in Greensboro, North Carolina. A 3-star wide receiver recruit, Harris committed to California over offers from Clemson, Duke, Maryland, North Carolina, and NC State.

== College career ==
Harris attended and played college football at the University of California, Berkeley.

=== Statistics ===
Year	Team	GP	Rec	Yds	Avg	TD
2012	California	7	9	99	11.0	0
2013	California	6	7	100	14.3	2
2014	California	9	25	252	10.1	2
2015	California	13	40	553	13.8	6
Career		35	81	1,004	12.4	10

== Professional career ==
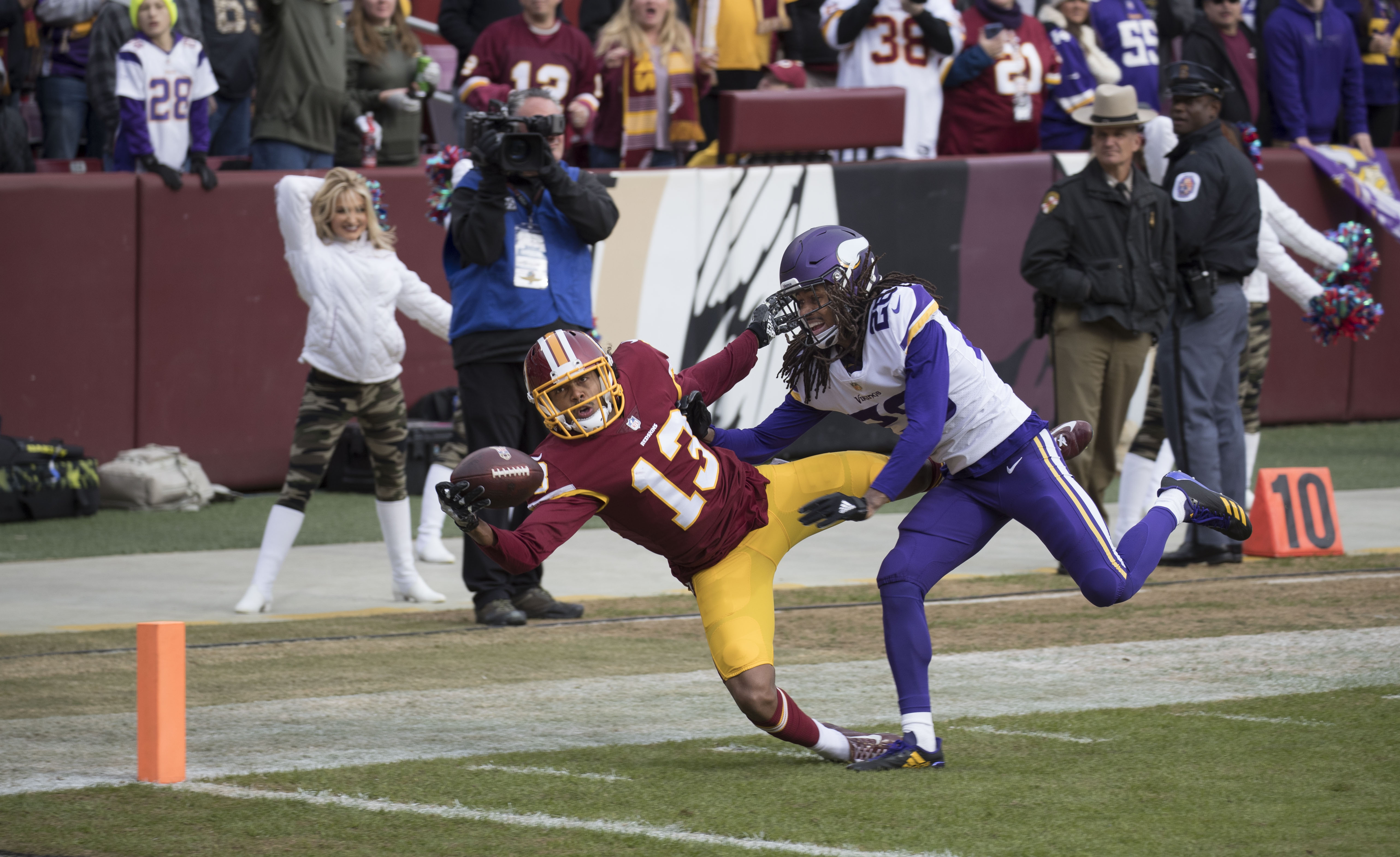
Harris making a one-handed catch against the Minnesota Vikings in 2017 for his first and only professional touchdown

=== Washington Redskins ===
After going unselected in the 2016 NFL draft, Harris signed with the Washington Redskins on May 2, 2016. On September 3, 2016, he was waived by the Redskins, but re-signed with their practice squad a day later. On October 21, 2016, he was activated from the practice squad to the active roster after wide receiver Josh Doctson was placed on the injured reserve list. Harris had his first career NFL reception in a game against the Minnesota Vikings in Week 10 of the 2016 season, finishing the game with three receptions for 28 yards.

On September 2, 2017, Harris was waived by the Redskins, and was signed to their practice squad the next day. He was promoted to the active roster on November 11, 2017. The following day, he caught a one-handed 36 yard pass against the Vikings, the first touchdown of his career.

On November 4, 2018, Harris set a career high with 10 receptions on 12 targets for 124 yards in a loss against the Atlanta Falcons. He was placed on injured reserve on December 28, 2018. He finished the 2018 season with 28 receptions for 304 yards and no touchdowns.

=== New England Patriots ===
On March 14, 2019, Harris signed a one-year contract with the New England Patriots. He was released on August 25, 2019, with an injury designation. He reverted to injured reserve the next day, then was released with an injury settlement.

=== New Orleans Saints ===
On January 16, 2020, Harris signed a reserve/future contract with the New Orleans Saints. He was released on August 2, 2020.

=== BC Lions ===
Harris signed with the BC Lions of the Canadian Football League on February 16, 2021. He retired from football on June 23, 2021.

== Personal life ==
Harris was married to Kayla Rodgers Harris. They have four children Brooklyn, Bailey, Kaisley and Berkeley. Kayla died on March 15, 2022. Harris' father-in-law is NFL positions coach Richard Rodgers Sr., while his brother-in-law is NFL tight end Richard Rodgers II. He is also the cousin and former high school and college teammate of Los Angeles Chargers wide receiver Keenan Allen.
