= If I Can Dream (web series) =

Webseries created by Simon Fuller

- Created by: Simon Fuller
- Countries of origin: United States; United Kingdom
- Original language: English
- No. of seasons: 1
- No. of episodes: 32

Production
- Executive producers: Simon Fuller; Michael Herwick
- Production company: 19 Entertainment

Original release
- Network: Hulu
- Release: March 2 – October 5, 2010

If I Can Dream is a webseries that was created by Simon Fuller. The show was not renewed for a second season in 2011.

== Format ==
This isn’t reality TV. There’s no judges or voting off. There’s not a pot of money sitting at the end ... the goal is to get a job that will allow us to get out of the house and to move on to a bigger career. This is just the first step.

— Kara Killmer

The show followed performers who moved into a house in Hollywood, California. The house was wired with 56 AXIS cameras and the footage was broadcast live on the show's website. Each contestant was judged to excel in either one of the creative arts, sport or fashion and the premise of the show was to follow them as they attempted to succeed in their chosen field.

As of December 2009, the house was fully prepared and on March 2, 2010, the cast moved in. The television aspect of the show was weekly 30-minute highlight shows airing first through Hulu then later through a traditional broadcast network. Clear Channel was to handle radio aspects and MySpace was the production's online partner. PepsiCo and Ford Motor Company signed on to sponsor the project. The first season concluded after 32 episodes . On October 4, 2010, the show's website said "Thanks for being a part of Season 1. Get ready for Season 2 starting in 2011."

=== Technology ===
The website's layout

The If I Can Dream House was wired with 56 AXIS Q1755 H.264 cameras delivering content across 3 CDNs (Akamai, BitGravity and Highwinds). Video feeds were available at both 500 kbit/s and 1 Mbit/s. As designed, If I Can Dream was the largest persistent live "event" produced by a media company. Accompanying the technology platform was a website built by an interactive design firm.

== Cast members ==
=== Dreamers ===
==== Original members ====
When the show debuted on March 2, 2010, the original five members of the cast included:

- Giglianne Braga /ˌdʒɪɡliˈɑːni/: a 21-year-old aspiring high-fashion model from Kearny, New Jersey. Over the course of the first season, she partook in numerous photo shoots and appeared in three music videos. Giglianne posed nude for a Marc Jacobs "Protect the Skin You're In" campaign and, along with Ben and Justin, PETA's "I'd Rather Go Naked Than Wear Fur" campaign.
- Ben Elliott: a 22-year-old aspiring actor from Hamburg, New York. Over the course of the first season, he concentrated on acting lessons from Kirby and casting calls but also participated in promotional photo shoots for PETA and a music video. He later had a recurring role on the ABC Family series The Lying Game.
- Justin Gaston: a 21-year-old Nashville Star season six contestant from Pineville, Louisiana and an aspiring Country singer-songwriter. He is also a former underwear model, and he is known for having been the former boyfriend of Miley Cyrus. He also starred in country singer Taylor Swift's "Love Story" music video. Justin performed at Wango Tango and local venues over the course of his stay. He also participated in a promotional photo shoot for PETA. He also briefly opened for Kris Allen.
- Kara Killmer: a 21-year-old aspiring actress from Crowley, Texas. Killmer graduated from Baylor University in Waco, Texas, in 2010 with a major in Theater Arts. Over the course of the first season, Kara took extensive acting lessons from John Kirby, attended casting calls, and participated in several fund raisers via the Pepsi Refresh Project.
- Amanda Phillips: a 23-year-old former NFL cheerleader from Geneva, New York aspiring to be an actress or model. Over the course of her stay, Amanda took several acting lessons from Kirby, attended casting calls, and participated in photo shoots.

==== Additions ====
- Alex Lambert: Joined the show on April 1, 2010. Lambert is a 19-year-old former American Idol season 9 semifinalist from North Richland Hills, Texas, whose early elimination prompted a petition to get him back on the show. Alex's song "Dream With My Eyes Open" replaced the Elvis Presley rendition of "If I Can Dream" as the show's theme song with Episode 11. "I Didn't Know", a soulful pop song written by Lambert with Nasri Atweh and Adam Messinger, was selected and made into a music video by Clear Channel and 19 Entertainment, and then released on July 26, 2010, through iHeartRadio The 15th Annual Webby Awards selected Lambert's "I Didn't Know" music video as an Official Webby Honoree in the Online Film & Video: Best Editing category. On June 26, 2012, Trouble, a song co-written by Alex Lambert and busbee was released on iTunes as X-Factor finalist Chris Rene's second single.
- Veronica Ballestrini, an 18 year old participant and winner of the "MySpace Dream Break" contest. She visited the mansion for a weekend and went on a date with Ben. A couple of weeks after her visit, Michael Herwick asked her to move into the mansion. During her time at the mansion she recorded her song "Fascinated", co-written with David Kopatz, and developed a romantic relationship with Alex Lambert.

==== Departures ====
- Amanda Phillips: Unable to deal with the lack of privacy inherent to the project, she decided to leave the show on May 8, 2010.
- Justin Gaston: Justin moved out of the house on June 24, 2010. His departure was a "graduation" as he joined American Idol winner Kris Allen as a temporary opening act on tour. He is currently writing in Nashville.

=== Additional talent ===
In addition to the Dreamers, the series regularly features appearances by Hollywood actors, musicians, producers, acting coaches, agents and more.

- John Kirby, brother of actor Bruno Kirby, is a renowned acting coach, having taught such talent as Cameron Diaz and Jim Caviezel among others. He makes regular appearances on the series giving acting lessons to Kara and Ben. He has also given lessons to Giglianne and formerly instructed Amanda.
- Michael Herwick is the executive producer of the show. Making regular appearances, he helps guide the Dreamers with his connections in the fashion, photography, music, and acting professions.
- Caitlin Levin is featured as the house chef. She provides cooking lessons and recipes to the live stream viewers.
- Lindsay Jones is featured in the beginning of the series as the house chef. She provides cooking lessons, plans themed dinners and shares recipes to the live stream viewers. Her recipes can be found on FoodFlirt.com.
- LeeAnn Smith Weintraub, MPH, RD, visited the house to provide nutrition counseling and diet advice.
- Jordyn Mallory, participant and winner of the second "MySpace Dream Break" contest. Mallory moved into the house for a period of two weeks during which she received complementary vocal, guitar, and piano lessons, as well as the opportunity to write and demo a song written with David Kopatz.
- Brandon Jones is featured as the house pool technician. He interacts with all the Dreamers, sometimes playing guitar and singing with Justin Gaston and Alex Lambert.

== See also ==
- 19 Entertainment
- CKX, Inc.
- American Idol
