= Keenan Allen =

American football player (born 1992)

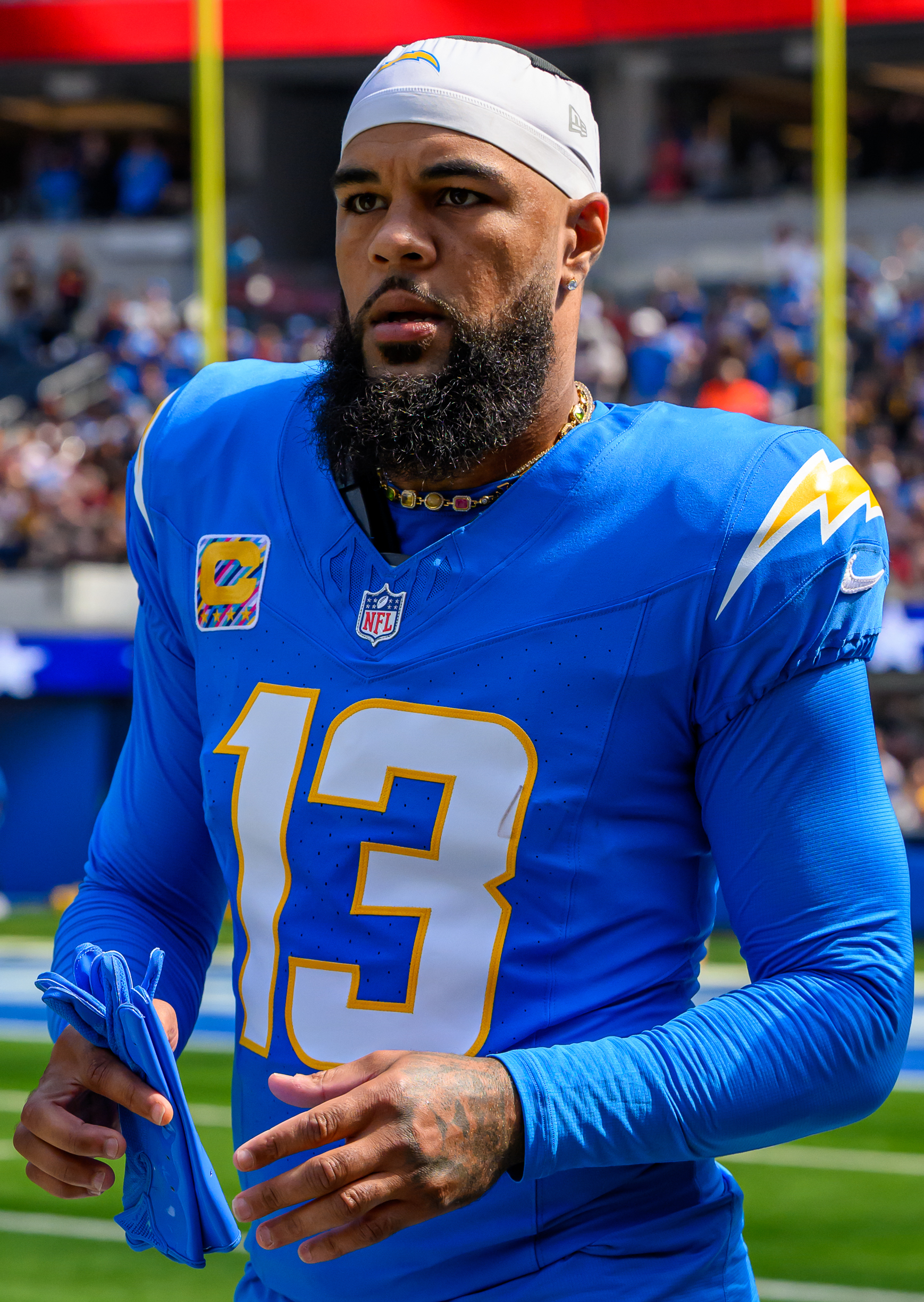
- Allen with the Los Angeles Chargers in 2025

No. 3 – San Francisco 49ers
- Position: Wide receiver
- Roster status: Active

Personal information
- Born: April 27, 1992 (age 34); Greensboro, North Carolina, U.S.
- Listed height: 6 ft 2 in (1.88 m)
- Listed weight: 211 lb (96 kg)

Career information
- High school: Northern Guilford (Greensboro)
- College: California (2010–2012)
- NFL draft: 2013: 3rd round, 76th overall pick

Career history
- San Diego / Los Angeles Chargers (2013–2023); Chicago Bears (2024); Los Angeles Chargers (2025); Indianapolis Colts (2026); San Francisco 49ers (2026–present)

Awards and highlights
- NFL Comeback Player of the Year (2017); Pepsi NFL Rookie of the Year (2013); 6× Pro Bowl (2017–2021, 2023); PFWA All-Rookie Team (2013); First-team All-Pac-12 (2011)

Career NFL statistics as of Week 10, 2026
- Receptions: 1,100
- Receiving yards: 12,463
- Receiving touchdowns: 71
- Interceptions: 1
- Stats at Pro Football Reference

Keenan Alexander Allen (born April 27, 1992) is an American professional football wide receiver for the San Francisco 49ers of the National Football League (NFL). He played college football for the California Golden Bears and was selected by the then San Diego Chargers in the third round of the 2013 NFL draft. Allen has also played for the Chicago Bears and Indianapolis Colts.

Allen won multiple rookie honors after setting Chargers records for receptions and receiving yards by a rookie. In 2017, he was named the NFL Comeback Player of the Year. In 11 seasons with the Chargers, Allen is a six-time Pro Bowler and is one of two players in franchise history to accumulate more than 10,000 career receiving yards. He is the all-time leader in receptions for the Chargers.

== Early life ==
Allen attended Grimsley Senior High School and then Northern Guilford High School in Greensboro, North Carolina, where he played football, basketball, and ran track. In football, Allen was a standout on both sides of the ball for the Nighthawks football team. He was a 2009 high school All-American, selected by USA Today and Parade, and also played in U.S. Army All-American Bowl, returning one punt for 33 yards as well as one kickoff also for 33 yards.

Allen was regarded as a five-star recruit by Rivals.com and Scout.com, and was widely considered the top defensive back in the nation. He initially committed to the University of Alabama to play safety, but switched his commitment to the University of California, Berkeley in order to play wide receiver and play with his half-brother, Zach Maynard.

In track & field, Allen was a state qualifier in the long jump (top-jump of 7.01 meters). As a senior, he competed in sprints. Allen took 24th in the 400-meter dash event at the 2010 PTFCA State Meet, with a time of 51.6 seconds. He also competed in the 100-meter dash, recording a personal-best time of 11.2 seconds. Not only that, but Allen was also timed at 4.56 seconds in the 40-yard dash.

== College career ==
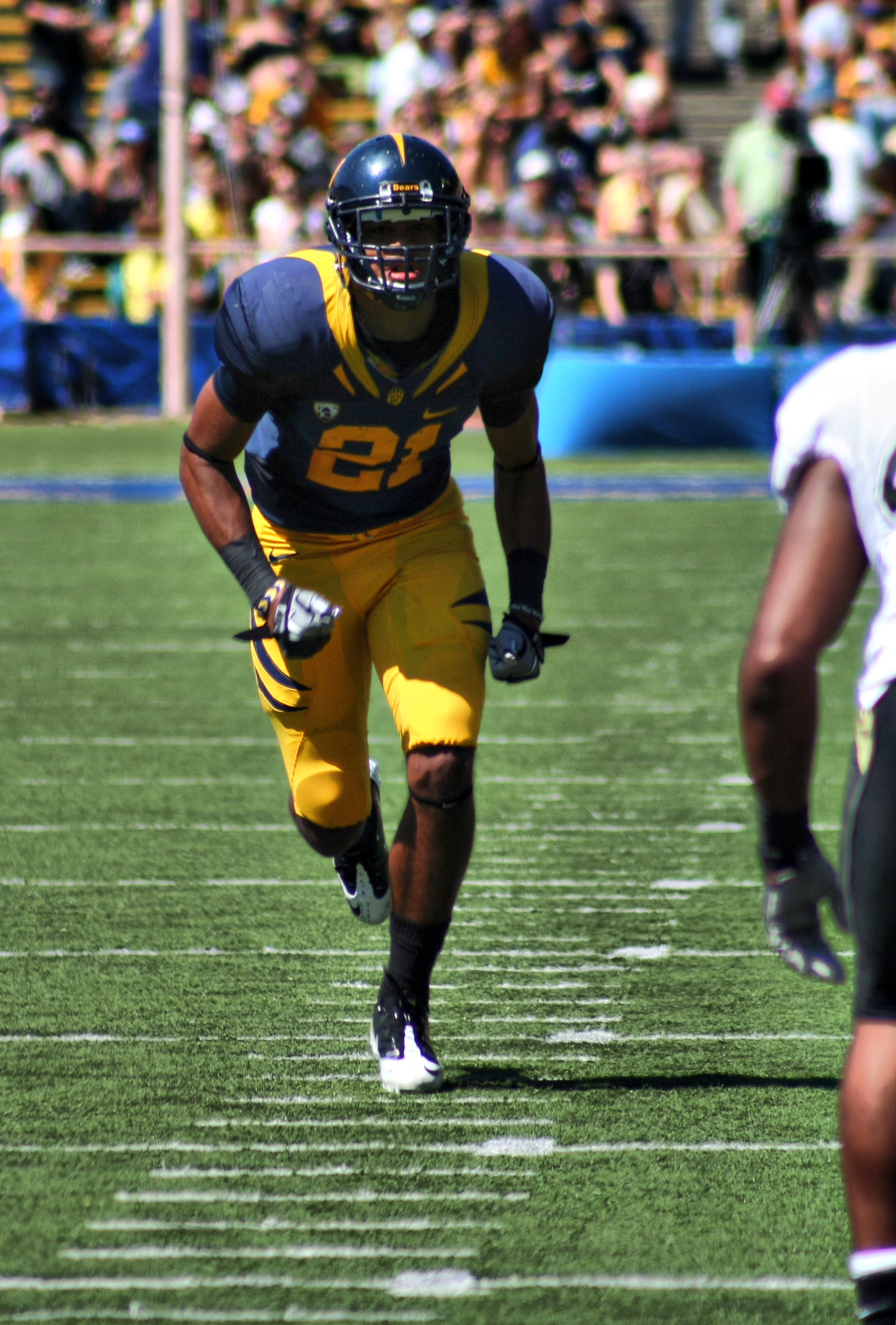
Allen playing for California in September 2010

Allen attended the University of California, Berkeley, where he started at wide receiver for the California Golden Bears football team from 2010 to 2012.

As a freshman in 2010, Allen had 46 receptions for 490 yards and five touchdowns.

As a sophomore in 2011, Allen had a career-high 98 receptions for 1,343 yards.

As a junior in 2012, Allen recorded 61 receptions for 737 yards and six touchdowns. He left Cal after his junior year, having caught a school-record 205 passes, for 2,570 yards (third in school history) and 25 touchdowns (seventh).

== Professional career ==
=== Pre-draft ===
Pre-draft measurables
Height	Weight	Arm length	Hand span	Wingspan	Wonderlic
6 ft 2 in (1.88 m)	206 lb (93 kg)	32 3/4 in (0.83 m)	10 in (0.25 m)	6 ft 4 3/4 in (1.95 m)	19
All values from NFL Combine

Due to a posterior cruciate ligament (PCL) sprain he sustained during the 2012 season, Allen did not work out at the NFL Scouting Combine, but did run routes at Cal's Pro Day. Allen was described by draft pundits as one of the best receivers in the 2013 NFL draft, estimating that he would be picked in the latter half of the first round.

On April 9, 2013, Allen attended his own pro day, where he showed his route-running skills and catching abilities to numerous scouts and reporters. Due to the aforementioned PCL sprain, Allen was not at peak performance, leading to a 4.71-second time in the 40-yard dash. He that he was only at 80% health on the pro day. This led to a drop in his projected draft position.

=== San Diego / Los Angeles Chargers (first stint) ===
==== 2013 ====
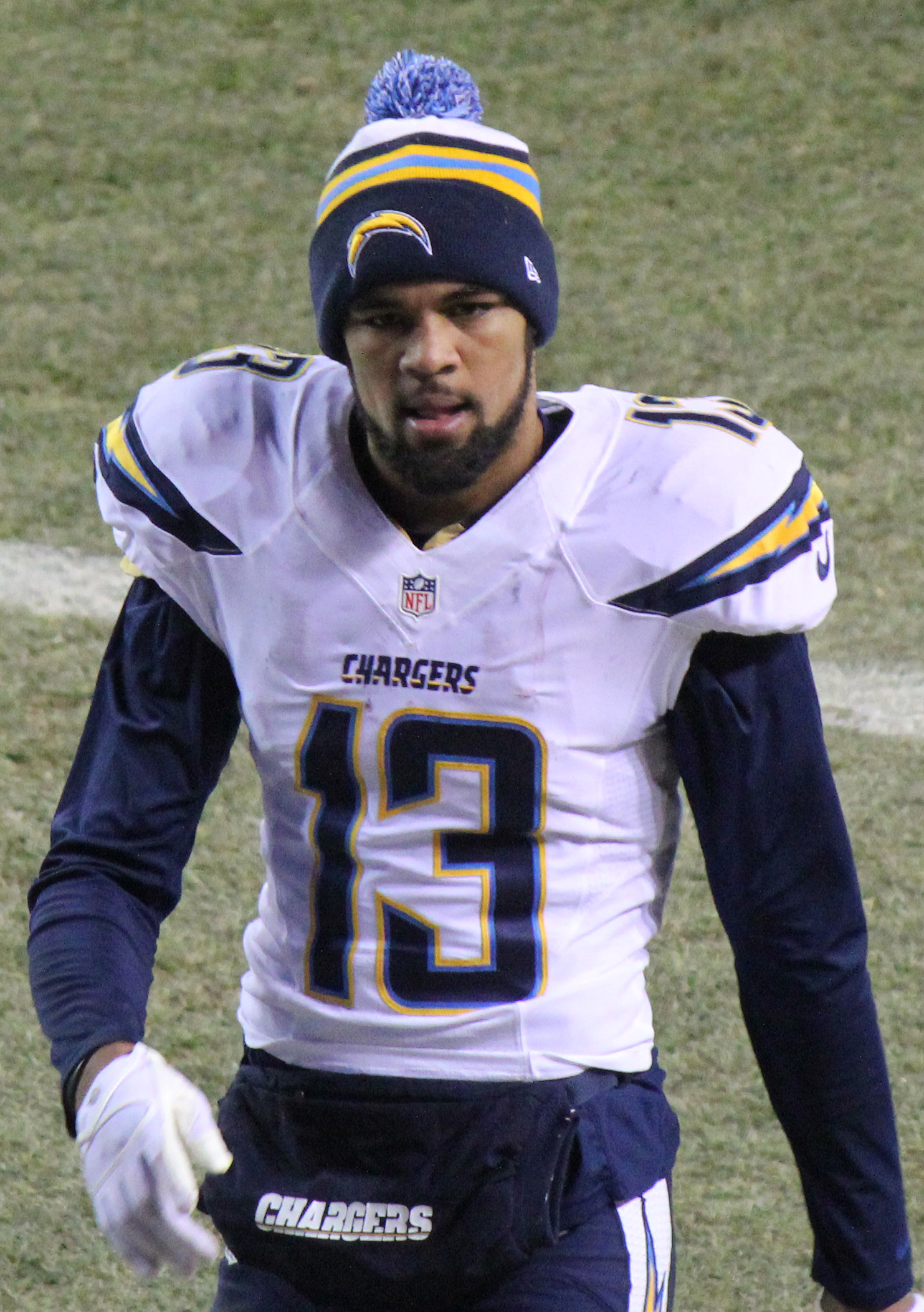
Allen in 2013

Allen was selected by the San Diego Chargers in the third round (76th overall) of the 2013 NFL draft, though the team already had solid depth at the wide receiver position. He was the highest selected wide receiver from Cal since DeSean Jackson in 2008. Allen had been on general manager Tom Telesco's radar for a while. In 2011, Telesco attended Cal's game against USC at San Francisco's AT&T Park where Allen enjoyed one of the most prolific days of his career that evening, catching a career-best 13 passes for 160 yards. On May 9, 2013, Allen signed a four-year, $2.81 million contract with the Chargers, which included a $613,800 signing bonus.

Allen struggled at times during training camp. Teammate and veteran tight end Antonio Gates envisioned that Allen in 2013 would play behind Eddie Royal, Vincent Brown, Malcom Floyd, and Danario Alexander. Although Alexander suffered a season-ending injury in the preseason, Allen did not participate in any offensive plays in San Diego's season opening loss to the Houston Texans. Unaccustomed to being a reserve player, he considered quitting football and returning to school to complete his degree. He began receiving playing time the following week against the Philadelphia Eagles when Floyd suffered a season-ending injury. On October 6, 2013, against the Oakland Raiders, Allen had his first 100-yard game as an NFL receiver, having six catches for 115 yards and a touchdown. The next week, in a win against the Indianapolis Colts, Allen recorded nine catches for 107 yards and a touchdown. In Week 14, he broke the franchise record for receptions in a rookie season, surpassing LaDainian Tomlinson, with 61 with three weeks remaining in the regular season.

Allen finished the season leading all NFL rookies with 71 receptions, and led the team with 1,046 receiving yards—which also broke the Chargers rookie record of 1,001 set by John Jefferson in 1978. Only five other rookies had ever had more receiving yards in league history, (Note: Anquan Boldin, Randy Moss, Michael Clayton, Terry Glenn, and A. J. Green had more receiving yards as rookies.) while his eight touchdowns tied him for third all-time with six other rookies. He also set a Chargers rookie record with five 100-yard games in a season, and he tied Royal for the team lead in touchdowns. Four times during the season Allen was voted the NFL Rookie of the Week, and he was named NFL Rookie of the Year by Sporting News over runner-up Eddie Lacy. While the Pro Football Writers Association (PFWA) named running back Lacy their 2013 Rookie of the Year, they also named Allen their Offensive Rookie of the Year. Allen was runner-up to Lacy for the Offensive Rookie of the Year by the Associated Press (AP), considered by the NFL to be its official award. In a vote by fans, Allen was named Pepsi NEXT NFL Rookie of the Year. Many experts came to view Allen's being drafted in the third round as a steal by San Diego; seven other wide receivers were taken before him. ESPN wrote in December that "Allen has performed like a first-round talent." The Chargers qualified for the playoffs that season. In the Wild Card Round, they defeated the Cincinnati Bengals by a score of 27–10. They advanced to the Divisional Round, when Allen caught two touchdowns during a comeback attempt in the fourth quarter of a 24–17 loss to the Denver Broncos. He finished with six receptions for 142 yards, becoming just the second rookie in NFL history to gain 100 receiving yards and score two touchdowns in a playoff game.

==== 2014 ====
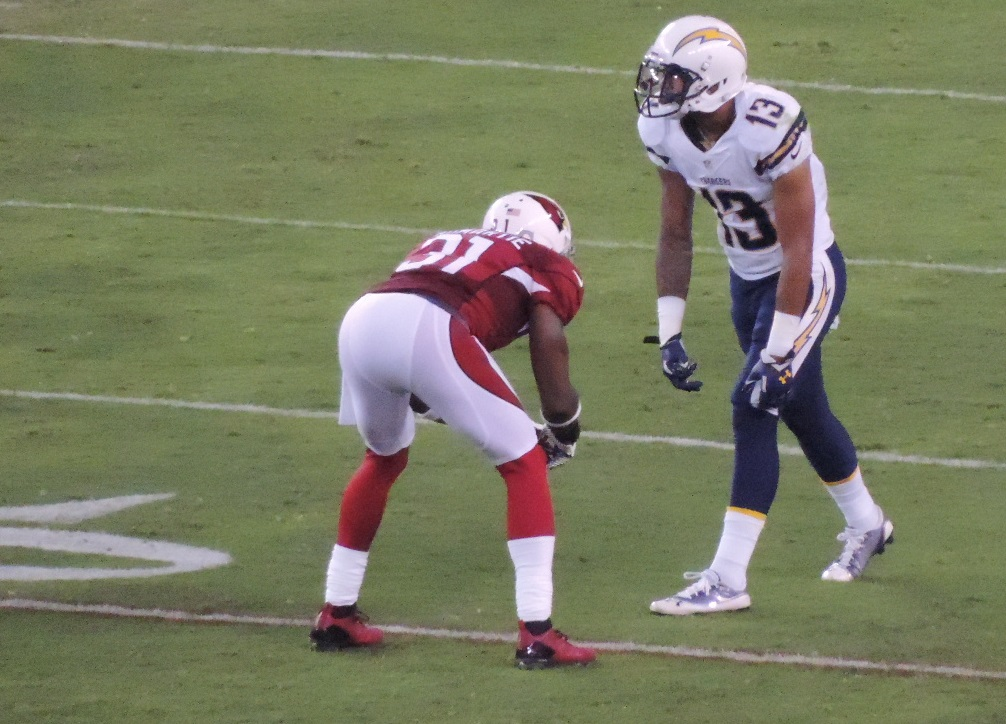
Allen (right) against Antonio Cromartie in 2014.

In Week 4 of the 2014 season, Allen established a career-high of 10 receptions for 135 yards in a 33–14 win over the Jacksonville Jaguars. During Week 12 against the Baltimore Ravens, he recorded two touchdowns and 121 yards contributing to the Chargers win. He missed the last two games of the season after suffering a broken right collarbone against the Broncos in Week 15.

Allen finished his second professional season with 77 receptions for 783 yards and four touchdowns.

==== 2015 ====
During the season-opening 33–28 victory over the Detroit Lions, Allen had 15 receptions for 166 yards, tying Kellen Winslow's franchise record for most receptions in a game. The next week, Allen struggled all game to get open, finishing with two receptions for 16 yards. However, the following week Allen caught both of the Chargers touchdowns and had 12 receptions for 133 yards in a losing attempt against the Minnesota Vikings. Against the Cleveland Browns, Allen had four receptions for 72 yards and a diving touchdown grab.

On November 3, the Chargers announced that Allen would miss the rest of the season after suffering a kidney injury. Overall, he finished the 2015 season with 67 receptions for 725 yards and four touchdowns.

==== 2016 ====
On June 10, 2016, Allen agreed to a four-year, $45 million contract extension with the Chargers. In the season opener against the Kansas City Chiefs, Allen was down on the field in pain with less than two minutes to go in the first half, and was carted off the field. He was diagnosed with an anterior cruciate ligament (ACL) tear and missed the rest of the season.

==== 2017: Comeback Player of the Year ====
During the season opener against the Broncos, Allen returned from his injury and had five receptions for 35 yards and a touchdown in the 24–21 loss. In the next game against the Miami Dolphins, Allen had nine receptions for 100 yards for his 13th career game with at least 100 yards and the first such since Week 6 of the 2015 season. During a Week 11 54–24 victory over the Buffalo Bills, he had 12 receptions for 159 yards and two touchdowns. In the next game against the Dallas Cowboys on Thanksgiving, Allen had 172 receiving yards and a touchdown as during the 28–6 road victory. The following week, Allen became the first player in NFL history to record three consecutive games of 10+ catches, 100+ receiving yards, and at least one touchdown.

On December 19, 2017, Allen was named to his first Pro Bowl. He finished the season, his first where he played 16 regular season games, with 102 receptions for 1,393 yards and six touchdowns. Allen's 102 receptions finished fourth in the league. He passed LaDainian Tomlinson (100) for the most in a season in Chargers history, and his 1,393 receiving yards finished third in the league behind Antonio Brown and Julio Jones and were second most in a season in Chargers history behind Lance Alworth. Allen was named the NFL Comeback Player of the Year after an impressive 2017 season coming back from a torn ACL in 2016. He was ranked 41st by his peers on the NFL Top 100 Players of 2018.

==== 2018 ====
Allen began the season with eight receptions for 108 yards and a touchdown against the Chiefs. On November 4, against the Seattle Seahawks, he had six receptions for 124 yards. Following the Seahawks game, he went on a stretch of five consecutive games with a receiving touchdown. His best game in that stretch was a 14-catch, 148-yard game against the Pittsburgh Steelers.

Allen finished the 2018 season with 97 receptions for 1,196 yards and six touchdowns. During the Wild Card Round, he had four receptions for 37 yards in the 23–17 road victory over the Ravens. In the Divisional Round against the New England Patriots, he had two receptions for 75 yards and a touchdown during the 41–28 road loss. Allen earned a second Pro Bowl nomination. He was ranked 38th by his fellow players on the NFL Top 100 Players of 2019.

==== 2019 ====
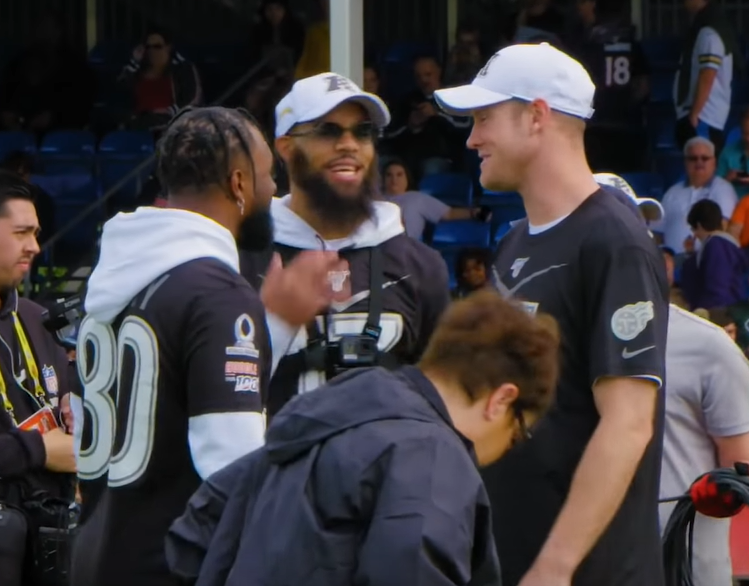
Allen with Jarvis Landry and Ryan Tannehill at the 2020 Pro Bowl.

During the season-opener against the Colts, Allen caught eight passes for 123 yards and his first touchdown of the season in the 30–24 overtime victory. Two weeks later against the Texans, Allen recorded 13 receptions for 183 yards and two touchdowns in the 27–20 loss.

Allen finished the season with a franchise record 104 catches for 1,199 yards and six touchdowns. He earned a Pro Bowl nomination for the third consecutive season. Allen was ranked 77th by his fellow players on the NFL Top 100 Players of 2020.

==== 2020 ====
On September 5, 2020, Allen signed a four-year, $80.1 million contract extension with the Chargers.

During Week 3, Allen had 13 receptions for 132 yards and a touchdown in the 21–16 loss to the Carolina Panthers. In Week 7 against the Jaguars, he recorded 10 receptions for 125 yards in the 39–29 victory. Two weeks later against the Las Vegas Raiders, Allen caught nine passes for 103 yards and a touchdown during the 31–26 loss.

During Week 11 against the New York Jets, Allen recorded 16 receptions for 145 yards and a touchdown in the 34–28 victory. He was placed on the reserve/COVID-19 list by the Chargers on December 31, 2020, and activated on January 7, 2021. Allen earned a Pro Bowl nomination for the fourth consecutive season. He was ranked 55th by his fellow players on the NFL Top 100 Players of 2021.

==== 2021 ====
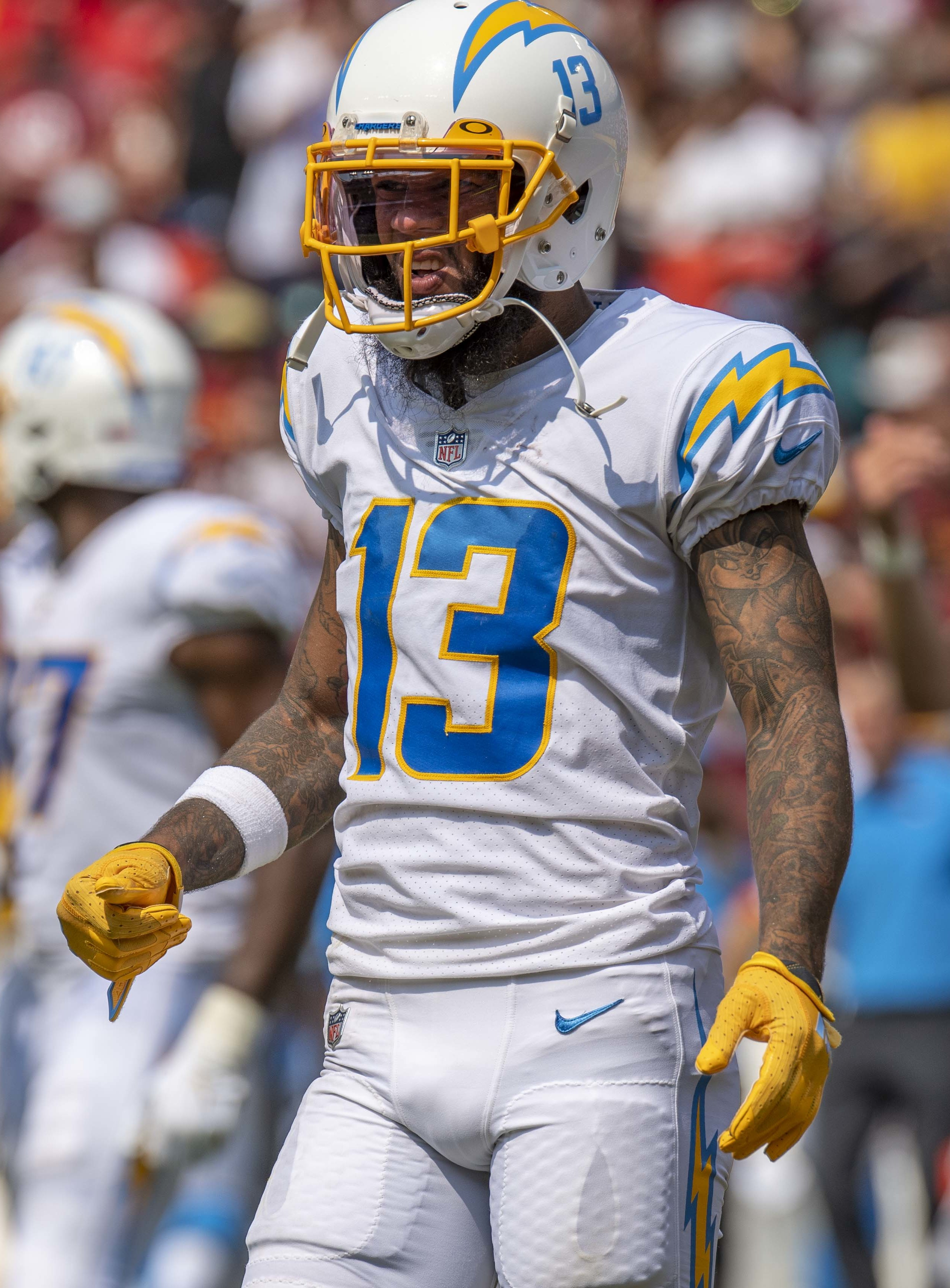
Allen in 2021

In the 2021 season, Allen finished with 106 receptions for 1,128 yards and six touchdowns. He had four games with at least 100 receiving yards. Allen earned a Pro Bowl nomination for the fifth consecutive season. He was ranked 35th by his fellow players on the NFL Top 100 Players of 2022.

==== 2022 ====
During the 2022 season, Allen caught 66 passes for 752 yards and four touchdowns. He had two 100-yard receiving games during the season.

==== 2023 ====
During Week 2 against the Tennessee Titans, Allen had eight receptions for 111 yards and two touchdowns in the 27–24 overtime road loss. In the next game against the Minnesota Vikings, he finished with 18 receptions for 215 yards and completed a pass to wide receiver Mike Williams for a 49-yard during the 28–24 road victory. Allen became the only player in NFL history to have three games with at least 15 receptions. He also became the first player in NFL history to record at least 15 receptions and throw a passing touchdown in the same game.

During Week 9 against the Jets, Allen reached 10,000 career receiving yards. In the next game, a loss to the Lions, he had 11 receptions for 175 yards and two touchdowns.

Allen finished the 2023 season with 108 receptions for 1,243 yards and seven touchdowns in 13 games. He earned his sixth Pro Bowl nomination.

=== Chicago Bears ===
On March 14, 2024, Allen was traded to the Chicago Bears in exchange for a fourth-round pick in the 2024 NFL draft.

During Week 6 against the Jaguars, he had two receiving touchdowns. In Week 13 against the Lions, he had another game with two receiving touchdowns. Three weeks later against the Lions, he had nine receptions for 141 yards and a touchdown.

Allen finished the 2024 season with 70 receptions for 744 yards and seven touchdowns.

=== Los Angeles Chargers (second stint) ===
On August 5, 2025, Allen returned to the Chargers on a one-year, $8.5 million contract.

During the season opener against the Kansas City Chiefs, Allen scored a touchdown in his return with the Chargers in the 27–21 victory. In Week 5 against the Washington Commanders, Allen became the fastest player in NFL history to reach 1,000 career receptions, doing so in 159 games. In the Week 10 win against the Pittsburgh Steelers, Allen passed Antonio Gates as the Chargers' franchise record holder for career receptions.

Allen finished the 2025 season with 81 receptions for 777 yards and four touchdowns.

=== Indianapolis Colts ===
On August 19, 2026, Allen signed with the Indianapolis Colts.

=== San Francisco 49ers ===
On November 10, 2026, Allen was traded to the San Francisco 49ers for a 2027 sixth-round pick.

He debuted on November 15, 2026 against the Dallas Cowboys with five receptions for 61 yards.

== Career statistics ==
Legend
**Bold**	Career high

=== NFL ===
==== Regular season ====
Year	Team	Games		Receiving					Rushing					Punt return					Fumbles	
Year	Team	GP	GS	Rec	Yds	Avg	Lng	TD	Att	Yds	Avg	Lng	TD	Ret	Yds	Avg	Lng	TD	Fum	Lost
2013	SD	15	14	71	1,046	**14.7**	43T	**8**	0	0	0.0	0	0	**15**	**125**	8.3	28	0	2	**2**
2014	SD	14	14	72	783	10.2	35	4	0	0	0.0	0	0	11	99	**9.0**	**29**	0	2	**2**
2015	SD	8	8	67	725	10.9	38	4	0	0	0.0	0	0	3	5	1.7	5	0	1	1
2016	SD	1	1	6	63	10.5	15	0	0	0	0.0	0	0	0	0	0.0	0	0	0	0
2017	LAC	16	15	102	**1,393**	13.7	51	6	2	9	4.5	6	0	0	0	0.0	0	0	1	0
2018	LAC	16	14	97	1,196	12.3	**54**	6	**9**	**75**	**8.3**	**28**	0	1	0	0.0	0	0	**3**	1
2019	LAC	16	16	104	1,199	11.5	34	6	3	16	5.3	18	0	0	0	0.0	0	0	0	0
2020	LAC	14	13	100	992	9.9	28	**8**	1	−1	−1.0	−1	0	0	0	0.0	0	0	**3**	**2**
2021	LAC	16	16	106	1,138	10.7	42	6	0	0	0.0	0	0	0	0	0.0	0	1	0	
2022	LAC	10	10	66	752	11.4	46	4	1	8	8.0	8	0	0	0	0.0	0	0	1	1
2023	LAC	13	13	**108**	1,243	11.5	42	7	2	6	3.0	4	0	0	0	0.0	0	0	2	1
2024	CHI	15	15	70	744	10.6	45	7	0	0	0.0	0	0	0	0	0.0	0	1	0	
2025	LAC	17	3	81	777	9.6	31	4	0	0	0.0	0	0	0	0	0.0	0	2	0	
2026	IND	8	4	40	351	8.8	26	0	0	0	0.0	0	0	0	0	0.0	0	0	0	0
2026	SFO	1	0	5	61	12.2	23	0	0	0	0.0	0	0	0	0	0.0	0	0	0	0
Career		180	156	1,100	12,463	11.3	54	71	18	113	6.3	28	0	30	229	7.6	29	0	19	10

==== Postseason ====
Year	Team	Games		Receiving					Rushing					Fumbles	
Year	Team	GP	GS	Rec	Yds	Avg	Lng	TD	Att	Yds	Avg	Lng	TD	Fum	Lost
2013	SD	2	2	**8**	**163**	**20.4**	**49**	**2**	—	—	—	—	—	0	0
2018	LAC	2	1	6	112	18.7	43	1	—	—	—	—	—	0	0
2022	LAC	1	1	6	61	10.2	23	0	—	—	—	—	—	0	0
2025	LAC	1	0	3	25	8.3	10	0	—	—	—	—	—	0	0
Career		6	4	23	361	15.7	49	3	0	0	0.0	0	0	0	0

=== College ===
Season	Team	GP	Receiving				Rushing			
Season	Team	GP	Rec	Yds	Avg	TD	Att	Yds	Avg	TD
2010	California	11	46	490	10.7	5	**18**	**136**	7.6	**1**
2011	California	13	**98**	**1,343**	**13.7**	**6**	9	55	6.1	0
2012	California	9	61	737	12.1	**6**	3	39	**13.0**	**1**
Career		33	205	2,570	12.5	17	30	230	7.7	2

== Television appearances ==
In 2023, Allen competed in season nine of The Masked Singer as "Gargoyle". After being saved by Jenny McCarthy ringing the Ding Dong Keep It On Bell on "DC Superheroes Night", he was eliminated during the "Battle of the Saved" alongside Lou Diamond Phillips as "Mantis".

== Personal life ==
Allen is married and has four children.

Allen is the younger half-brother of quarterback Zach Maynard, who also played at Cal. The two combined for the longest pass play in school history when they hooked up on a 90-yard score against the Washington Huskies. They share a mother, Dorie Maynard-Lang, and Maynard's biological father, Scott Lang, is Allen's stepfather. Allen's cousin, Maurice Harris, is a former NFL wide receiver, with the two being teammates in high school and college.

Allen is childhood friend of former cornerback David Amerson, who was selected in the 2013 NFL draft by the Washington Redskins.

On August 30, 2026, Allen was arrested in Indianapolis on preliminary charges of operating a vehicle while intoxicated and OWI causing endangerment.
