= Northeast Guilford High School =

American public school in North Carolina

Location
- 6700 McLeansville Road; McLeansville, North Carolina; United States
- Coordinates: 36°09′31″N 79°40′25″W

Information
- Type: Public
- Oversight: Guilford County Schools
- CEEB code: 342570
- Principal: KaTrinka Brown
- Teaching staff: 65.68 (FTE)
- Grades: 9–12
- Enrollment: 960 (2023-2024)
- Student to teacher ratio: 14.62
- Campus type: Rural
- Colors: Navy and white
- Nickname: Rams
- Conference: 3–A; Mid State Conference
- Website: northeasths.gcsnc.com

Northeast Guilford High School is a secondary school located in McLeansville, North Carolina. The school serves grades nine through twelve, with an enrollment of 1265 students for the 2007 school year. Demographically, the school serves primarily Caucasian and African American students, who make up 47% and 43% of total enrollment respectively. The remainder of the student body is composed of Hispanics (5%), multi-racial students (3%), Asians (1%), and American Indians (1%),

Northeast Guilford has a main building, a vocational building, and a well-established amount of portable classrooms. The school has a Junior Reserve Officers' Training Corps, and Advanced Placement classes.

Northeast Guilford's varsity football team has been the most dominating sports team in school history. The football team has been to the state playoffs 17 years in a row. The Northeast Guilford Choral Department is also one of the best in the state, winning over 50 national and regional titles spanning over 25 years.

== Notable alumni ==
- Brevin Allen (2018) — NFL player for the Green Bay Packers, formerly of the Los Angeles Chargers
- Mitch Atkins (2004) — former MLB pitcher
- Amanda Busick (2005, December 2004 graduation) — sports reporter
- Jaylin Davis (2012) — MLB outfielder for the San Francisco Giants
- James DuBose — Hollywood television executive, pioneering figure of FOX Soul, founding figure of In The Black Network
- David Emanuel Hickman — United States Army soldier
- Brandon Jones — actor, musician, and producer
- Todd Withers (2014) — professional basketball player
