= Veronica Ballestrini =

American singer-songwriter (born 1991)

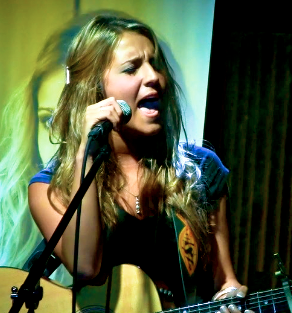

Background information
- Born: Veronica Jean Ballestrini; October 29, 1991 (age 34); Waterford, Connecticut, United States
- Genres: Country; pop
- Occupations: Singer; songwriter
- Instruments: Guitar; keyboard; vocals
- Years active: 2008–present
- Label: Timbob
- Member of: The Rebel Roads
- Website: www.veronicaballestrini.net

Veronica Jean Ballestrini, also known as Veronica Vesely (born October 29, 1991) is an Italian-American singer and songwriter. She has released two studio albums. Her self-made success story has caught national attention as Jon Caramanica wrote in The New York Times, "...When someone like Ms. Ballestrini arrives essentially unannounced and begins to attract attention, it's significant."

== Biography ==
Ballestrini was born in New London, Connecticut, and raised in Waterford, Connecticut. She comes from a large family of four brothers and one sister. Her father Rosario Ballestrini and mother Carol Marandino Ballestrini are both Italian-American.

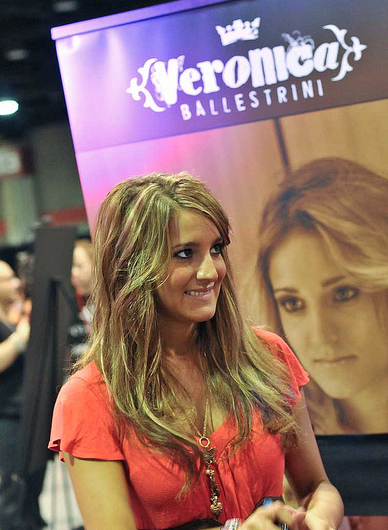
Ballestrini signing at CMA Festival.

Ballestrini began playing guitar and writing songs at the age of thirteen, the same year she started her MySpace music page. With only cover songs up at the time, she still managed to attract many fans. Veronica's popularity increased after writing and composing her song "Daddy" and posting it to her MySpace playlist. At age fourteen Ballestrini began performing around her home state of Connecticut at local talent contests and fairs. In November 2006, Ballestrini won 1st place at the USA World Showcase in Las Vegas, performing her song "Daddy". Her internet status caught the attention of Nashville record producers, who then contacted her about recording in Music City.

While still in high school, Ballestrini made her professional singing debut. Ballestrini created an independent label in 2009 and worked with producer Cliff Downs, with whom she has written many songs. Downs produced her debut album "What I'm All About".

== Music career ==
=== 2009-2010: What I'm All About ===
Ballestrini went on to record her debut album What I'm All About which was released on August 21, 2009 on her own independent label. Her first single "Amazing" charted at #24 on the Music Row chart. and the music video debuted at No. 3 on CMT Pure. "Don't Say" and "Out There Somewhere" were two other singles released off this album. Ballestrini was named one of six "Artists to Watch For" by Marie Claire Magazine.

Ballestrini's song "Destiny" is featured in the Diary of an Ex-Child Star (formerly Leaving Hollywood) movie and on the soundtrack. "Destiny" is also on her "What I'm All About" CD.

=== 2010: If I Can Dream ===
In April 2010, Ballestrini was chosen as the "Editors Pick" in the If I Can Dream MySpace contest, created by Simon Fuller. She visited the Dream House in Beverly Hills from June 4–7, 2010. Ballestrini returned to the Dream House on June 23, 2010. During her stay she recorded her song "Fascinated" and worked with top writers, vocal coaches and had a romantic link to Alex Lambert. She was at the house for two weeks. Lambert and Ballestrini broke up Winter 2010. For her audition video, Ballestrini sang "Blessed The Broken Road" by Rascal Flatts.

=== 2010-2012: Gotta Make A Change ===
In 2010, Ballestrini was part of the "Mead Five Star" Music Insider nationwide sweepstake along with 9 other bands. In October 2010 it was announced Veronica was the winner of the fan voted contest, scoring $25,000. Ballestrini used that money to work on new music.

In 2011, Ballestrini began working on a project titled Gotta Make A Change, a process that set in motion her "Gotta Make A Change" tour. Throughout the summer 2011, Ballestrini performed shows at various camps, festivals, Girl Scout events and women's correctional facilities across the U.S. to help spread the project's motivational message.

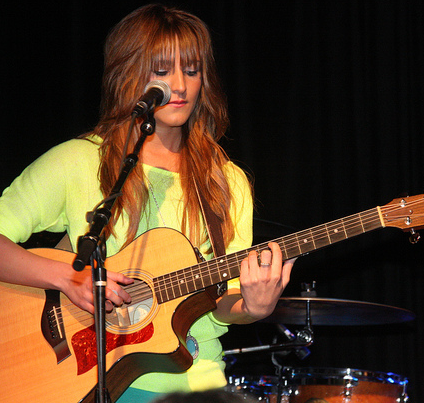
Ballestrini performing 2012.

In July 2011, Ballestrini announced to her fans her new single would be "Temporary Fix". The music video for this single was shot in Malibu, California. "Temporary Fix" was released on iTunes on August 11, 2011 and the music video, released on September 24, 2011. In November 2011, Ballestrini charted on the Billboard Social 50 chart and #2 for Country artists.

In 2012, Ballestrini released another single "Don't Give Up On Me", along with a music video.

Ballestrini was in a relationship with country singer Shay Mooney from Dan and Shay from Summer 2011 to March 2013. During their relationship, they would post cover and original songs on YouTube and reached over 400,000 views combined. The pair co-wrote songs for Ballestrini's sophomore album "Flip Side". The album was released on June 17, 2014.

=== 2014-present: Flip Side ===
In 2014, Ballestrini changed her album title name from "Gotta Make A Change" to "Flip Side". Ballestrini still continued to work on this album with producer/engineer Brandon Metcalf. While working on her album, Ballestrini went on a U.S. tour with Secondhand Serenade and Juliet Simms. The tour kick off show was in Lexington, KY on March 8 and ended in Hollywood, CA on April 9.

Ballestrini has three duets on Secondhand Serenade's album Undefeated, which was released in October 2014. Ballestrini is also featured on the Secondhand Serenade cover of "Say Something".

In April 2014, Ballestrini was chosen by Ford to be an agent for the Ford Fiesta Movement as part of a promotion with Ford and YouTube. She received a 2015 Ford Fiesta for a year, along with free gas, insurance, and all expenses paid.

On April 24, 2015, Ballestrini became engaged to Secondhand Serenade front man John Vesely. The couple met at Destiny Recording Studio in Nashville in early 2013 to record a Secondhand Serenade duet titled "By The Way". Veronica and John were married on April 1, 2017, in Vero Beach, Florida.

=== The Rebel Roads ===
Veronica and John Vesely form The Rebel Roads, a country duo. Their first single "First To Know" was released in 2016.

They have since released 8 singles together and working on an upcoming album.

== Discography ==
=== Albums ===
Title	Details
What I'm All About	Release date: August 21, 2009; Label: Timbob Records
Flip Side	Release date: June 17, 2014; Label: Timbob Records

=== Singles ===
Year	Single	Album
2009	"Amazing"	What I'm All About
2009	"Out There Somewhere"	What I'm All About
2010	"Don't Say"	What I'm All About
2011	"Storm Inside of You"	—N/a
2011	"Temporary Fix"	—N/a
2012	"Don't Give Up on Me"	—N/a
2014	"Cookies and Cream"	Flip Side

=== Music videos ===
Year	Video	Director
2007	"What's Up with That"	Glenn Sweitzer
2009	"Amazing"	Glenn Sweitzer
2009	"Out There Somewhere"	Glenn Sweitzer
2010	"Don't Say"	Glenn Sweitzer
2011	"Temporary Fix"	DJ Cosgrove
2012	"Don't Give Up on Me"	DJ Cosgrove
2014	"Guys Like You"	DJ Cosgrove
2014	"Cookies and Cream"	Carl Diebold

== Filmography ==
Shows
Year	Title	Role	Notes
2010	If I Can Dream	Herself	5 episodes
2010-2011	I'm Still Dreaming	Herself	7 episodes
2013	Fiesta Movement	Herself	3 episodes

Music Video Appearances
Year	Title	Artist	Director
2009	Days That We Live For	Matt Gary	Glenn Sweitzer
2009	Trail of Lies	Katie Armiger	Glenn Sweitzer
2011	Start Again	Sam Tsui	Kurt Hugo Schneider
2012	Perfectly	Shay Mooney	Harcourt Media
2013	Heart Stops (By the Way)	Secondhand Serenade	Dylan White
2013	La La Love	Secondhand Serenade	Glenn Sweitzer
2014	Shake It Up	Secondhand Serenade	Secondhand Serenade
2019	That's How You Got It	John Gurney	Chase Lauer
