= T. J. Logan =

American football player (born 1994)

No. 22
- Position: Running back

Personal information
- Born: September 3, 1994 (age 32); Greensboro, North Carolina, U.S.
- Listed height: 5 ft 9 in (1.75 m)
- Listed weight: 196 lb (89 kg)

Career information
- High school: Northern Guilford (Greensboro)
- College: North Carolina (2013–2016)
- NFL draft: 2017: 5th round, 179th overall pick

Career history
- Arizona Cardinals (2017–2018); Tampa Bay Buccaneers (2019–2020); New Orleans Breakers (2022)

Awards and highlights
- Super Bowl champion (LV); Second-team All-ACC (2016)

Career NFL statistics
- Rushing attempts: 5
- Rushing yards: 12
- Receptions: 9
- Receiving yards: 50
- Return yards: 691
- Stats at Pro Football Reference

T. J. Logan (born September 3, 1994) is an American former professional football player who was a running back in the National Football League (NFL). He was selected by the Arizona Cardinals in the fifth round of the 2017 NFL draft. He played college football for the North Carolina Tar Heels.

== Early life ==
Logan attended Northern Guilford High School in Greensboro, North Carolina. He was a three-sport letter winner in football, basketball, and track. In football, he helped lead his team to three straight NCHSAA 3AA state championships. In basketball, he was a three-time all-conference selection, and in track, he was a two-time 200 meter and one-time 100 meter 3A state champion. He was also honored as the 2012–13 NCHSAA Male Athlete of the Year.

== College career ==
Logan attended North Carolina to play collegiate football, where he earned second-team All-ACC honors as a specialist in 2016. His 4,926 career all-purpose yards was fourth best in North Carolina history.

== Professional career ==
Pre-draft measurables
Height	Weight	Arm length	Hand span	40-yard dash	Vertical jump	Broad jump	Bench press
5 ft 9 1/2 in (1.77 m)	196 lb (89 kg)	32 in (0.81 m)	9 in (0.23 m)	4.37 s	33.5 in (0.85 m)	10 ft 1 in (3.07 m)	17 reps
All values from NFL Combine

=== Arizona Cardinals ===
Logan was selected by the Arizona Cardinals in the fifth round, 179th overall, in the 2017 NFL draft. He was the 18th running back selected in that year's draft. Logan dislocated his wrist in the preseason and was ruled out for 12 weeks. He was placed on injured reserve on September 4, 2017.

On September 1, 2019, Logan was waived by the Cardinals.

=== Tampa Bay Buccaneers ===
On September 2, 2019, Logan was claimed off waivers by the Tampa Bay Buccaneers. He played in 12 games as the Buccaneers primary returner before being placed on injured reserve on December 10, 2019, with a fractured thumb.

Logan was placed on injured reserve again on August 23, 2020, after suffering a leg injury during training camp. He was moved to the reserve/COVID-19 list on November 20, 2020, and moved back to injured reserve on November 30.

=== New Orleans Breakers ===
On March 10, 2022, Logan was selected by the New Orleans Breakers of the United States Football League. He was transferred to the team's inactive roster on April 30 due to a foot injury. He was released on May 6.
