= Justin Gaston =

American actor (born 1988)

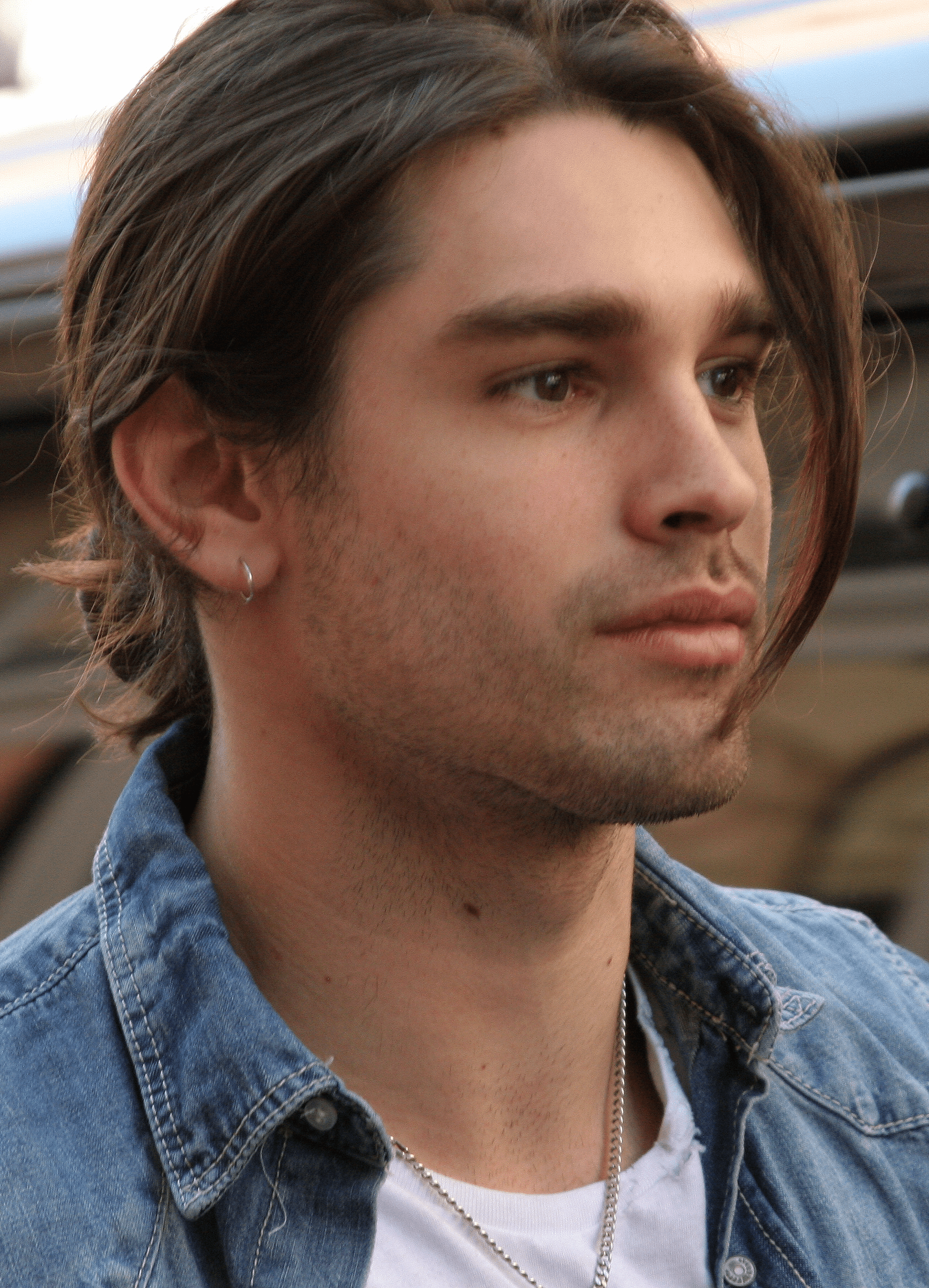
- Gaston in 2010
- Born: Justin Michael Gaston; August 12, 1988 (age 38); Pineville, Louisiana, U.S.
- Occupations: Actor; model; singer
- Years active: 2008–present
- Spouse: Melissa Ordway (m. 2012)
- Children: 2

Justin Michael Gaston (born August 12, 1988) is an American singer-songwriter, model, and actor who was also a contestant on Nashville Star on season 6. He finished 10th overall out of 12 contestants. He portrayed the role of Ben Rogers on Days of Our Lives for less than four months in 2014. He appeared on the magazine cover of Tetu in 2013.

== Career ==
In 2006, Justin Gaston left his hometown of Pineville, Louisiana, to pursue a career in acting. Gaston first worked as an underwear model for Christian Audigier, Adidas, International Jock, and Hugo Boss.

Gaston appeared as Taylor Swift's love interest on her 2008 music video for "Love Story", and also appeared on the pilot episode of the television series Glee, which premiered on the Fox network on May 19, 2009.

In February 2010, Gaston began appearing on Simon Fuller's interactive reality show, the If I Can Dream webseries, which aired on Hulu. The show provided round-the-clock coverage of the daily lives of five aspiring stars who had moved into a house in Hollywood, California. Gaston's costars were Ben Elliott, Giglianne Braga, Kara Killmer, and Amanda Phillips.

On April 14, 2010, Gaston performed a duet on Simon Fuller's American Idol with Brooke White, the fifth place finalist on season 7. Gaston's song choice was the Elvis Presley ballad, "If I Can Dream".

During the summer of 2010, Gaston was a temporary opening act for American Idol winner Kris Allen.

On February 6, 2014, it was announced that Gaston joined the cast of the soap opera Days of Our Lives. He played the role of Jordan Ridgeway's brother, Ben Rogers, making his first appearance on February 27. After four months, he was let go from the role, and was replaced by former All My Children actor Robert Scott Wilson.

In November 2020, it was announced Gaston had been temporarily cast in the role of Chance Chancellor on The Young and the Restless.

== Personal life ==
Gaston was born in Pineville, Louisiana. He attended Pineville High School. He competed in track and field, finishing sixth in the pole vault at the 2005 Louisiana High School Athletic Association (LHSAA) 4A State Championship meet. Gaston achieved a height of 12' 6" in the competition.

Gaston once dated Miley Cyrus before their breakup in June 2009. Gaston married actress Melissa Ordway on September 22, 2012. In 2016, Gaston and Ordway adopted their first child, a daughter they named Olivia Christine, born in April 2016. Ordway gave birth to their second daughter, Sophie Jolie, on December 9, 2017.

== Filmography ==
Film
Year	Title	Role	Notes
2011	Deadly Sibling Rivalry	Police Officer	
2011	Escapee	Kyle	
2012	Game Change	Levi Johnston	
2014	Ice Scream	Mark	
2014	The Concerto	Shane	
2014	Hollywood Miles	Chad	
2015	The Unauthorized Full House Story	John Stamos	
2020	Night into Day	James	Lead role
2020	Until We Meet Again	Shane	
2020	Beautifully Flawed	James	Post-production

Television
Year	Title	Role	Notes
2008	Nashville Star	Himself	Three episodes; Sixth season contestant
2009	Glee	Football Player	One episode; "Pilot"
2010	If I Can Dream	Himself	18 episodes
2012	Single Ladies	Gavin	One episode
2013	The Client List	J. D. Whitman	One episode
2014	Days of Our Lives	Ben Rogers	Recurring role
2018–2019	The Haves and the Have Nots	Mack	3 episodes
2020	The Young and the Restless	Phillip "Chance" Chancellor	Role held: November 23 – December 15, 2020
2022	Santa Bootcamp	Aiden	TV movie
2024	God's Country Song	Noah	TV movie

== See also ==
- List of male underwear models
