= Kara Killmer =

American actress

- Born: June 14, 1988 (age 38)
- Education: Baylor University (BFA)
- Occupation: Actress
- Years active: 2010–present
- Notable work: Chicago Fire
- Spouse: Andrew Cheney (m. 2016)

Kara Killmer (born June 14, 1988) is an American actress, best known for starring as paramedic Sylvie Brett in the NBC drama series Chicago Fire (as well as the associated series Chicago Med and Chicago P.D., which together make up the One Chicago franchise), from 2014 to 2024. Prior to that, she starred in the short-lived 2010 Hulu original reality web series If I Can Dream.

== Early life and education ==
Killmer attended Baylor University in Waco, Texas, and graduated in 2010 with a Bachelor of Fine Arts in performing arts.

== Career ==
Killmer starred in the short-lived Hulu original reality web series If I Can Dream in 2010, which featured five aspiring actors and actresses who were trying to make it in the entertainment business by living together in a Los Angeles home, fitted with cameras following their every move, “The goal is to get a job that will allow us to get out of the house and to move on to a bigger career. This is just the first step.”

In 2014, Killmer was cast as Athena True in the NBC science fiction crime thriller pilot Tin Man, but it was not picked up by the network when it announced its 2014–15 television schedule. That same year, Killmer joined the cast of the NBC drama Chicago Fire as Sylvie Brett, the paramedic who replaces Leslie Shay (Lauren German) in the third season premiere titled "Always" that aired on September 23, 2014. She was featured on the cover of Chicago Splash magazine's August 2016 issue with Chicago Fire co-stars Monica Raymund and Miranda Rae Mayo.

Killmer made her feature film debut with her future husband Andrew Cheney and John Rhys-Davies in the Revolutionary War action-adventure thriller Beyond the Mask that was released on April 6, 2015.

== Personal life ==
On May 14, 2016, Killmer married her Beyond the Mask co-star Andrew Cheney, whom she met on August 27, 2012, on the set of the film.

== Filmography ==
=== Film ===
Year	Title	Role	Notes	Ref.
2012	Remnant	—	Short film	
2012	Prank	Beth	Short film	
2015	Beyond the Mask	Charlotte Holloway		
2019	The Follower	Mary	Short film	
2026	Jimmy	Lady Julia		

=== Television ===
Year	Title	Role	Notes	Ref.
2010	Kangsi Coming (康熙來了)	Herself	Guest; episode: "小年夜之漢典當家"	
2010	If I Can Dream	Herself	Main role, 32 episodes	
2011	Scary Tales	Rapunzel	Episode: "The Pied Piper & Rapunzel"	
2012	Jane by Design	Blonde Girl	Episode: "The Image Issue"	
2013	Rosa the Imposer	Sandra	Episode: "# Equality"	
2013	Horizon	Anna Webber	TV movie	
2014	Tin Man	Athena True	Unsold NBC pilot	
2014–2024	Chicago Fire	Sylvie Brett	Main role	
2014–2020	Chicago P.D.	Sylvie Brett	Recurring role, 10 episodes	
2015–2021	Chicago Med	Sylvie Brett	Recurring role, 18 episodes	
2017	Chicago Justice	Sylvie Brett	Episode: "AQD"	
2017	Special Skills	Receptionist	Episode: "Hot Tea"	
2018	Sleeper a.k.a. My Husband’s Secret Life	Jennifer Jones	TV movie	
