= McLeansville, North Carolina =

- Census-designated place
- Location in Guilford County and the state of North Carolina
- Coordinates: 36°06′16″N 79°39′19″W
- Country: United States
- State: North Carolina
- County: Guilford
- Named for: The McLean family

Area
  - Total: 6.21 sq mi (16.08 km^{2})
  - Land: 6.14 sq mi (15.89 km^{2})
  - Water: 0.073 sq mi (0.19 km^{2})
- Elevation: 742 ft (226 m)

Population (2020)
  - Total: 1,113
  - Density: 181.5/sq mi (70.06/km^{2})
- Time zone: UTC-5 (Eastern (EST))
  - Summer (DST): UTC-4 (EDT)
- ZIP code: 27301
- Area code: 336
- FIPS code: 37-40460
- GNIS feature ID: 2403270

McLeansville is an unincorporated community and census-designated place (CDP) in Guilford County, North Carolina, United States. The population was 1,113 at the 2020 census.

== Geography ==
McLeansville is located in eastern Guilford County. It is bordered to the west by the city of Greensboro; additionally, an exclave of the city is surrounded by the southern part of the CDP. McLeansville's center is 9 miles (14 km) east of Greensboro, merely a few blocks north of US 70 (Burlington Road).

According to the United States Census Bureau, the CDP has a total area of 6.2 square miles (16.1 km^{2}), of which 6.1 square miles (15.9 km^{2}) is land and 0.1 square miles (0.2 km^{2}), or 1.18%, is water. South Buffalo Creek forms the western edge of the CDP, flowing north to Buffalo Creek and part of the Reedy Fork Creek–Haw River–Cape Fear River watershed.

The town of McLeansville hosts a grocery store, post office, several small businesses, and several churches. The interchange with Interstate 40 and Interstate 85 is located south of the town center, connecting the largest five cities of NC with each other inside the location of Guilford County. US 70 is the main corridor that links the town to neighboring communities such as Greensboro, Sedalia, Gibsonville, Whitsett and Burlington. Interstate 785 traverses in the western areas of the town, connecting to US 29. The town is also home to a Publix Supermarket distribution center, situated along US 70. It was finished in 2022 at an estimated cost of $300 million. Areas bordering the town, particularly to the north, are characterized by rolling farmland, wooded areas, and suburban homes. Several strip malls with grocery stores and other businesses are in the outlying areas. The northern edge of McLeansville is accessible via US 29 and Hicone Road (Exit 136) from Greensboro; here, visitors can access Northeast Guilford Middle and High Schools, as well as Boldmoon Preserve, a passive park that features frontage along Reedy Fork Creek, with nature trails and interpretive signage.

== Demographics ==
Historical population
Census	Pop.	Note	%±
1980	1,176		—
1990	1,154		−1.9%
2000	1,080		−6.4%
2010	1,021		−5.5%
2020	1,113		9.0%
U.S. Decennial Census

As of the census of 2000, there were 1,080 people, 439 households, and 331 families residing in the CDP. The population density was 166.8 inhabitants per square mile (64.4/km^{2}). There were 468 housing units at an average density of 72.3 per square mile (27.9/km^{2}). The racial makeup of the CDP was 94.54% White, 2.96% African American, 0.37% Native American, 0.09% Asian, and 1.02% from other races. Hispanic or Latino of any race were 1.85% of the population.

There were 439 households, out of which 32.8% had children under the age of 18 living with them, 59.7% were married couples living together, 10.9% had a female householder with no husband present, and 24.4% were non-families. 21.6% of all households were made up of individuals, and 10.3% had someone living alone who was 65 years of age or older. The average household size was 2.46 and the average family size was 2.84.

In the CDP, the population was spread out, with 24.2% under the age of 18, 6.9% from 18 to 24, 26.8% from 25 to 44, 27.4% from 45 to 64, and 14.8% who were 65 years of age or older. The median age was 40 years. For every 100 females, there were 93.5 males. For every 100 females age 18 and over, there were 94.5 males.

The median income for a household in the CDP was $45,875, and the median income for a family was $51,089. Males had a median income of $34,250 versus $32,083 for females. The per capita income for the CDP was $21,548. About 4.6% of families and 8.3% of the population were below the poverty line, including 13.2% of those under age 18 and 2.8% of those age 65 or over.

== Notable people ==
- Daughtry, rock band
- Chris Daughtry, American Idol contestant, lead singer of the band Daughtry
- Brandon Jones, actor and musician
